= Eduardo Val =

Spanish trade unionist

Eduardo Val Bescós
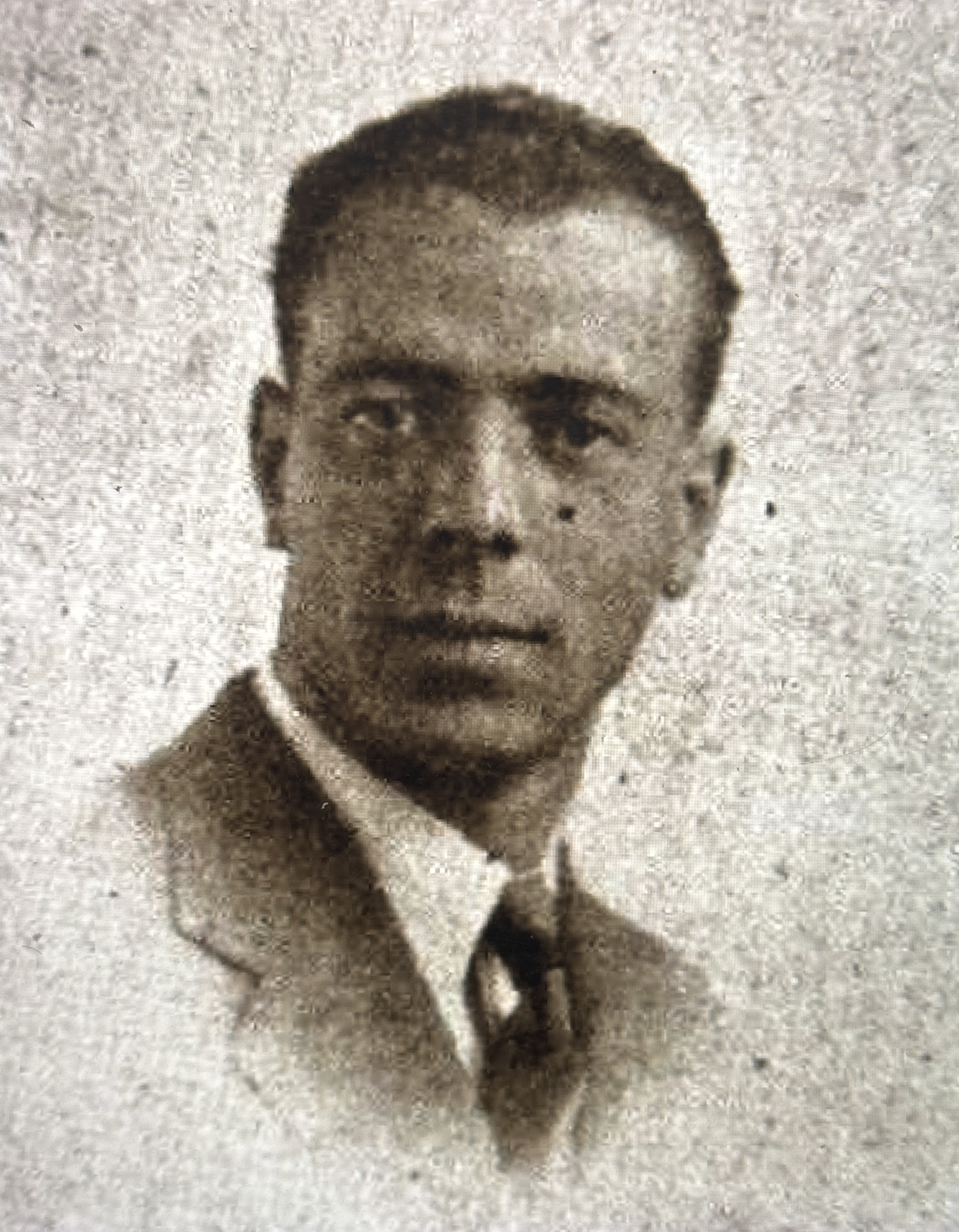
- Eduardo Val

Councillor of Communications & Public Works
- In office 5 March 1939 – 1 April 1939
- President: José Miaja
- Vice President: Julián Besteiro

Personal details
- Born: 1906 A Coruña, Galicia, Spain
- Died: 1 May 1992 (aged 85–86) Béccar, Argentina

Military service
- Allegiance: Spanish Republic
- Branch/service: Confederal militias (1936–1937); Spanish Republican Army (1937–1939)
- Years of service: 1936–1939
- Unit: Central Defence Committee (1936–1939); National Defence Council (1939)
- Battles/wars: Spanish Civil War: Spanish Revolution of 1936; Siege of Madrid; Spanish coup of March 1939

Eduardo Val Bescós (A Coruña, 1906 – Béccar, 1 May 1992) was a Galician anarcho-syndicalist. During the Spanish Civil War, he was the leader of the Central Defence Committee and later took part in the Spanish coup of March 1939.

== Biography ==
Eduardo Val Bescós was born in A Coruña in 1906.

=== Leadership in the Central Defence Committee ===
Val participated in the resistance to the Spanish coup of July 1936 in Madrid, as head of the Central Defence Committee of the National Confederation of Labour (CNT). According to Ricardo Sanz, Val was at the centre of the Defence Committee, providing immediate responses to issues whenever they were presented to him. Val provided leadership to the anarchist militias during the battle for control of the capital, with Eduardo de Guzmán reporting that he gave orders "with few words" and that they were quickly accepted and obeyed by the CNT fighters.

After defeating the coup in the Spanish capital, on 21 July, he reported that the Nationalist forces had taken control of almost all of Old Castile, but had been defeated by workers' militias in Catalonia and Valencia. In order to establish communications with Republican forces in the Levante and ensure they took control of New Castile and Aragon, Val recommended that the Madrid militias be dispatched to capture Alcalá de Henares, Guadalajara and Toledo. Under Val's direction, the cities were swiftly captured in a matter of days.

By September 1936, the Defence Committee had outlined regulations for the anarchist militias, stressing military discipline and compliance with orders. Through Madrid's trade unions and social centres, the Committee recruited volunteers into the confederal militia columns, the first of which they established was the Rosal Column. They also organised the supply lines for the militias, providing them with food, clothing and medical services.

When Nationalist forces closed in around Madrid, on 6 November, Val ordered the Rosal Column to turn back anybody that attempted to flee the city. At Tarancón, the Column detained several government ministers and even the mayor of Madrid, Pedro Rico, as they attempted to escape to Valencia. Val was informed of the incident by Cipriano Mera and immediately went to Tarancón, where at 02:00 on 7 November, he allowed the ministers to continue to Valencia but forced the mayor to return. After the Siege of Madrid had begun, on 15 November 1936, the Defence Committee called a meeting, attended by Val, Mera and Buenaventura Durruti (of the Durruti Column), in which high command posted the militias to different sections of the front line. As the siege continued and Durruti was killed in the fighting, Val began to speak of a need for the militias to be reorganised along military lines. He then established a central command for the Madrid militias, with a general staff to coordinate their actions.

=== Role in the Casado coup ===
Val remained at the head of the Central Defence Committee throughout the rest of the Spanish Civil War. From December 1937 to November 1938, he contributed to the publication the Galician anarchist magazine Galicia Libre. As the Nationalists moved closer towards victory in early 1939, in his capacity as head of the Central Defence Committee, Val was in contact with Segismundo Casado. Together they made plans for a coup d'état to remove the government of Juan Negrín and begin negotiations for a surrender. At 08:00 on 5 March 1939, Val and Casado invited Cipriano Mera to a meeting, where they informed him that they were about to proclaim a National Defence Council. They ordered Mera to take his 70th Mixed Brigade and occupy strategic points in Madrid. At 22:00, the Council announced it had taken power. Val was given charge of the Ministry of Communications and Public Works.

On 7 March, the Spanish anarchist organisations reorganised themselves under the banner of the Spanish Libertarian Movement. It held meetings throughout the rest of the month, which were attended by Val as a representative of the National Defence Council. On 22 March, when it became clear that Francisco Franco would only accept an unconditional surrender, Val insisted that the National Defence Council put together a last stand against the Nationalists. Val also called for anarchists that had fled Catalonia into France to return to central Spain and help them resist the final Nationalist offensive. He initially resisted proposals for evacuation, but by the end of the month, he finally agreed to establish evacuation committees. As the Republican Army collapsed, only a few hundred of the planned tens of thousands managed to evacuate.

=== Exile and later life ===
Val went into exile in Argentina, where he continued his political activity in a bakers' union. He was prosecuted and sentenced to life imprisonment in absentia by the Special Tribunal for the Repression of Freemasonry and Communism. Val died in the Argentine town of Béccar on 1 May 1992.

== Bibliography ==
- Alexander, Robert J. (1999). The Anarchists in the Spanish Civil War. Janus Publishing Company. ISBN 978-1-85756-412-9.
- Jaspe, Alvaro (2003). "El gallego no-fascista: Galician Republican perspectives and propaganda during the Spanish Civil War". International Journal of Iberian Studies. 16 (2): 101–114. doi:10.1386/ijis.16.2.101/0. ISSN 1364-971X.
