= National Defence Council (Spain) =

Governing council of Republican Spain (1939)

- Consejo Nacional de Defensa
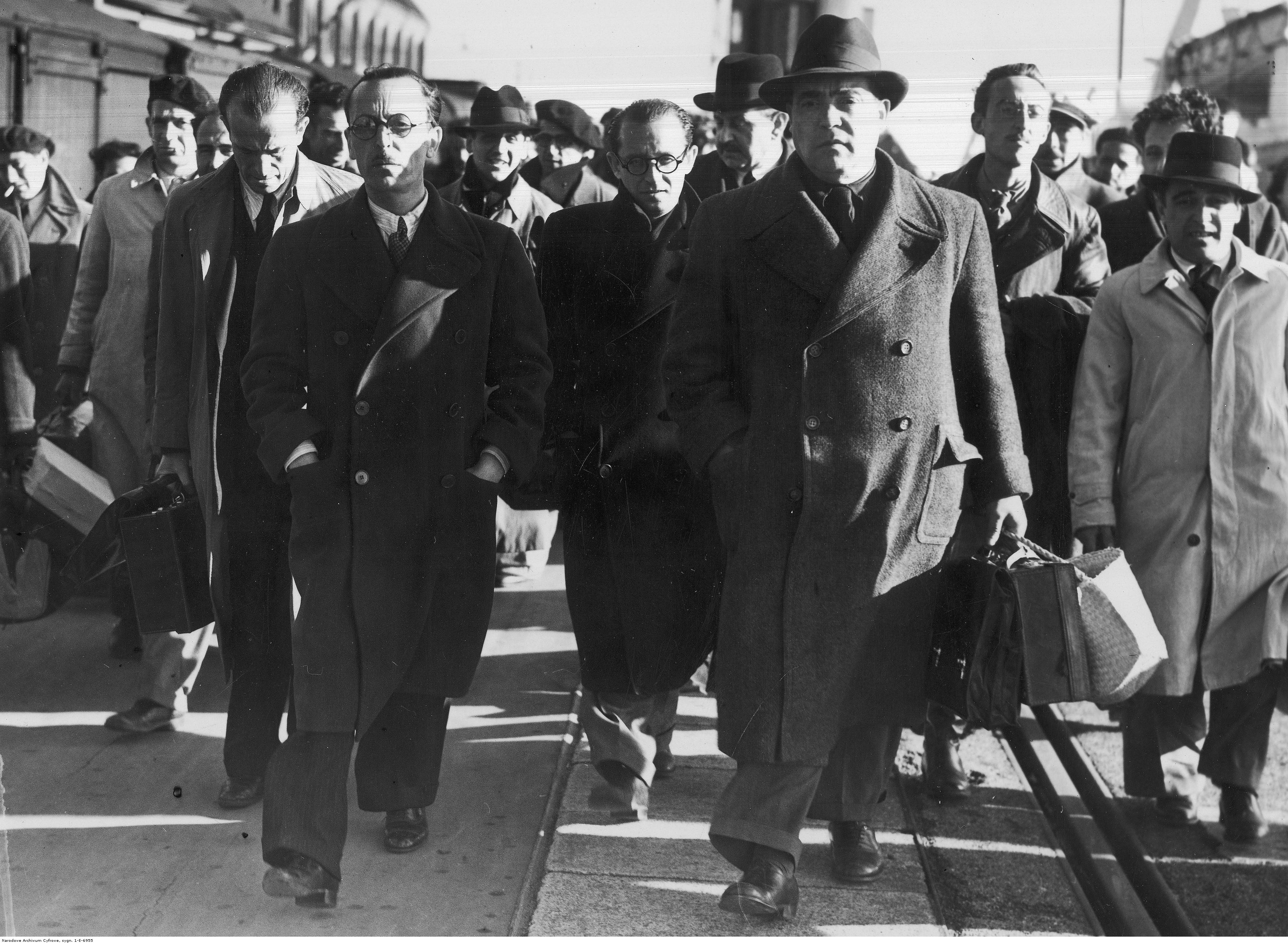
- The leaders of the National Defence Council upon their arrival to the United Kingdom: Segismundo Casado, on the left; Wenceslao Carrillo, wearing a hat.
- Formation: 5 March 1939
- Founded at: Madrid
- Dissolved: 28 March 1939; 87 years ago
- Type: Governing Council
- Headquarters: Madrid, Real Casa de la Aduana, Calle de Alcalá
- Location: Palacio de Cibeles
- Coordinates: 40.417281°N 3.701827°W
- Region served: Southeast Spain
- President: José Miaja

The National Defence Council (Spanish: Consejo Nacional de Defensa) was the governing body in Republican Spain at the end of the Spanish Civil War (1936–1939). The council seized power with Colonel Segismundo Casado's coup on 5 March 1939 when it was clear that the Republicans had lost the war. The leaders hoped to negotiate an end to hostilities with the rebel forces led by General Francisco Franco. However, Franco insisted on unconditional surrender, and on 26 March 1939 launched the final offensive of the Spanish Civil War. By the end of the month he controlled the whole country. Most of the council members escaped into exile on British warships.

== Background ==
As early as May 1937, when Julián Besteiro of the Spanish Socialist Workers' Party went to London to represent the Spanish Republic at the coronation of King George VI, president Manuel Azaña asked him to inquire if the British government would mediate in the civil war. Besteiro met Anthony Eden on 11 May 1937, but did not get any positive assurances. With the news of the fall of Barcelona on 26 January 1939, and Azaña's resignation as president, Besteiro decided to seek peace. Besteiro wanted to dissolve the Popular Front and replace it with a government that excluded communists, since he thought the policy of the Western democracies towards the civil war was determined by anti-communism rather than appeasement of Hitler and Mussolini. Besteiro contacted Colonel Segismundo Casado, commander of the Republican Army of the center to discuss a coup.

The Federación Anarquista Ibérica (FAI, Iberian Anarchist Federation) tried to persuade President Manuel Azaña to dismiss the government of Juan Negrín at the start of December 1938, before the rebel Catalonia Offensive. They asked him to form "a Government of Spanish significance, which doesn't have in fact and law, as the present one does, the hallmark of dependence on Russia, composed of men free of responsibility for all the disastrous and irresponsible behaviors which characterize the present Government."

The fall of Catalonia in February 1939 virtually ensured that the rebels would win the war. The Negrín government temporarily took refuge in France, where 400,000 civilian and military refugees had fled. General José Miaja, who had supreme command of the Republican forces, communicated with Negrin, who was in Toulouse, on 9 February 1939. Miaja wanted permission to negotiate a peace given the extreme weakness of his remaining forces.

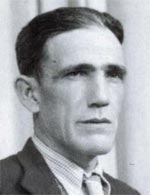
Cipriano Mera, whose troops ensured the survival of the council

Negrín returned to Spain on 10 February 1939 and met Segismundo Casado two days later. Casado reported that with the loss of Catalonia, production of war material had dropped by 50%. There was an alarming shortage of raw materials. He said that "Under the circumstances we cannot produce the indispensable minimum for continuing the struggle." By contrast, the enemy had "high morale of victory ... In such conditions, the fall of Madrid is inevitable causing enormous loss of lives, which will be sacrificed in vain." Negrin agreed that the situation was extremely grave, but said "circumstances demand that we continue fighting." Cipriano Mera, commander of the IV Army Corps of the center, was also convinced that the Republicans would be defeated. When President Negrín refused to surrender to Francisco Franco, Mera decided to support Casado and Besteiro in their coup.

On 2 March 1939 the Ministry of Defense decreed a major set of changes to the military command. Miaja was moved from Commander in Chief of Land Forces to the symbolic Inspector General of Air, Sea and Land Forces. Various communists were promoted and assigned to important positions of command, while opponents of communists were moved to insignificant posts. Enemies of Negrín would use the decree as evidence that he was preparing a communist coup. Others deny this and say that it would have been against Stalin's policies at the time.

In the event it was the trigger for Casado claimed was a preemptive coup. There had however been months of preparation by Casado before that, including negotiations by Casado with supporters of Franco. On 4 March 1939 there was a meeting in Casado's residence between Casado, Cipriano Mera and his chief of staff Antonio Verardini, and the CNT central zone defense committee leaders Eduardo Val and Manuel Salgado Moreira. They were told that the communists were planning a coup for 6–7 March, so had to act fast. At this meeting they decided on the names of most of the men who would form the Council of National Defense.

== Coup ==
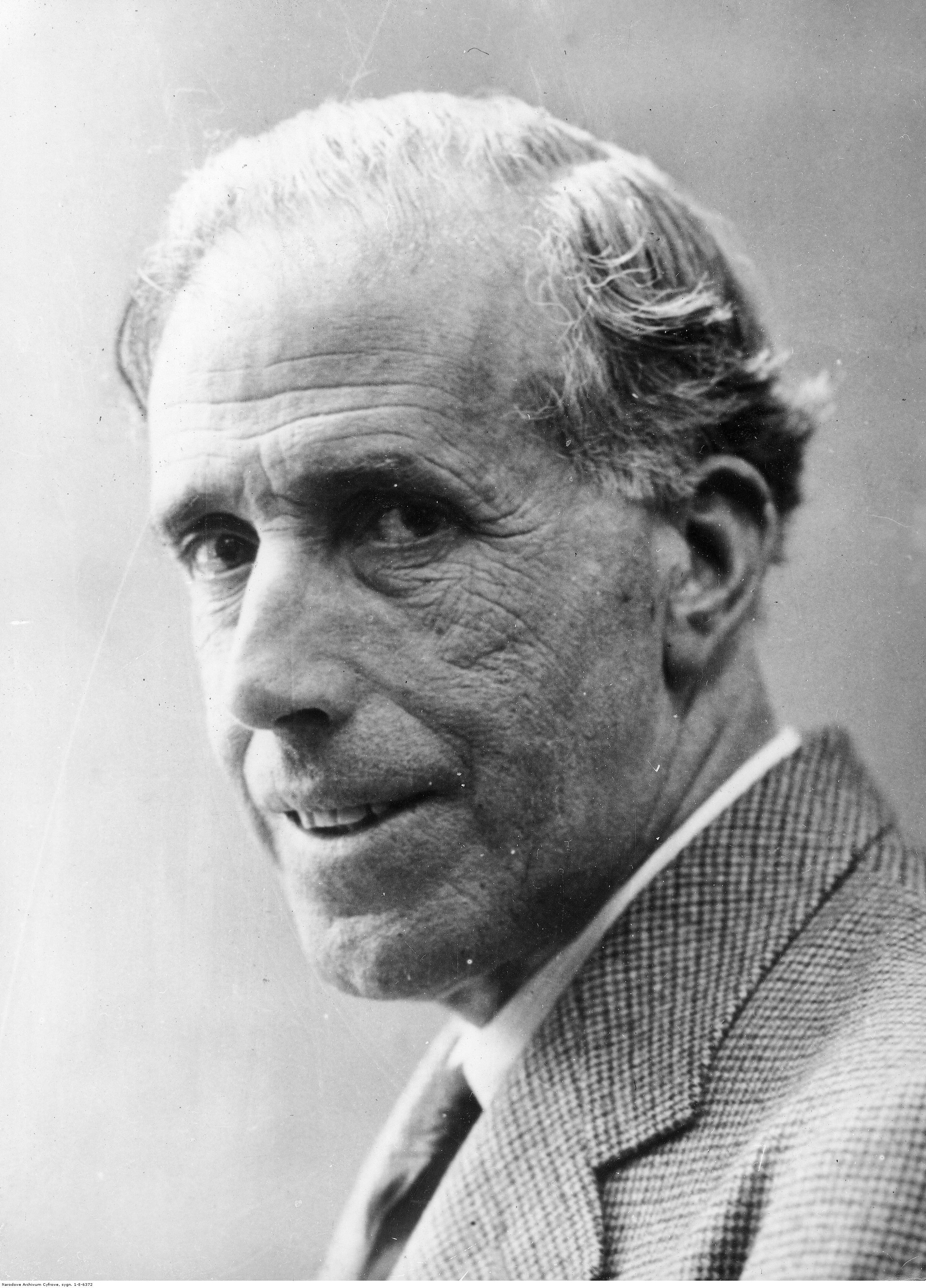
Julián Besteiro, one of the coup leaders

Casado set up his base at 7 p.m. on Sunday, 5 March 1939 in the building of the former Ministry of Finance. As he wrote later "This very old building lent itself to a good plan of defense in the event of a Communist uprising." He had been joined by most of his fellow conspirators by 8 p.m. Besteiro, the most prominent person among them, proposed that Casado become both president and responsible for defense. Casado said he would only temporarily preside over the council until General Miaja arrived from Valencia. Mera reached the Ministry of Finance at 9 p.m.

The formation of the National Defense Council (Consejo Nacional de Defensa) was announced on Union Radio at 10 p.m. The members of the council were named, with representatives from most of the political parties and groups who had supported the Republic. Besteiro and Casado both spoke. Casado claimed that Negrín was planning a Communist takeover. The objective of the council was to seek an armistice with the rebels and end the fratricidal war. Cipriano Mera, Miguel San Andrés and José del Rio also spoke. San Andrés, now responsible for Justice, read the somewhat vague official manifesto of the council. The president and directors of the council were:

Portfolio	Office holder	Party
President	José Miaja	Army
Vice-president and Director of Foreign Affairs	Julián Besteiro	Spanish Socialist Workers' Party
Director of the Interior	Wenceslao Carrillo	Spanish Socialist Workers' Party
Director of Defense	Segismundo Casado	Army
Director of Finance	Manuel González Marín	National Confederation of Labor
Director of Labor	Antonio Pérez	General Union of Workers
Director of Justice	Miguel San Andrés	Republican Left
Director of Education & Health	José del Río	Republican Union
Director of Communications & Public Works	Eduardo Val	National Confederation of Labor

Rafael Sánchez Requena represented the Partido Sindicalista as secretary to the council. Toribio Martínez Cabrera had been appointed military governor of Madrid in December 1938 by Negrín's government. Casado appointed him undersecretary in the council. Juan López Sánchez was another member of the council. After the National Defense Council was formed, a new Comité Nacional del Movimiento Libertario Español (National Committee of the Spanish Libertarian Movement) was formed on 7 March 1939 with Juan López as secretary-general.

== History ==
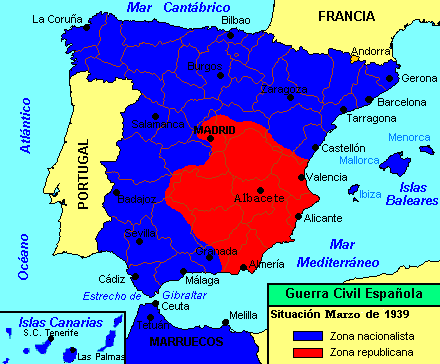
Map of the two Spains, March 1939

The 61-year-old Miaja knew that he had little future, and would be a figurehead in the council. But with Miaja as president, many professional officers in Madrid, New Castile, the Levante and the remainder of Republican-held territory accepted the authority of the council. Juan Negrín did little to oppose the coup. He and his former Foreign Secretary Julio Álvarez del Vayo boarded a plane for France late in the evening of 6 March 1939.

The controversial decision of the anarchist CNT-FAI to collaborate with Casado and his political supporters in the council proved vital to the success of the coup. The anarchists gave their political support to the council, and the troops commanded by anarchists, particularly those under Cipriano Mera, overcame resistance. A counter-rebellion caused fighting in Madrid between Casado's forces and communists from 7 to 12 March. The cause was probably a well-justified fear of an anti-communist purge rather than opposition to capitulation. Cipriano Mera's forces played a crucial role in the defeat of the communists. The counter-rebellion failed at the cost of nearly 2,000 lives.

The council abolished the five-pointed red star that had been worn by all ranks from sergeant up in the Republican army. The stated reason was that it "has no hierarchical significance", but the real reason was its association with communism. To prevent pointless waste of life the council let Republican troops disband, and arranged to evacuate civilians and soldiers who wanted to leave Madrid.

On 12 March 1939, Casado communicated to the rebel government that he and General Manuel Matallana wanted to come to Burgos to negotiate peace terms. The council prepared an eight-point peace proposal. They requested a political amnesty, time to be given for those who wanted to leave Spain to do so, and "respect for the lives, liberties, and careers of professional soldiers." On 18 March 1939, Besteiro gave a broadcast on Madrid radio in which he explained what was being done. He quoted the communication from the National Defense Council to the Nationalist Government, in which the council said it was willing to start negotiations that would ensure an honorable peace and at the same time avoid needless bloodshed. However, Franco had no interest in negotiations. On 19 March 1939 the reply was received from Franco saying that he was not prepared to receive the senior officers at Burgos and deal with them as equals. He would only accept unconditional surrender.

The council abolished the Servicio de Investigacion Militar (SIM) intelligence agency, which seems to have mostly been staffed by PSOE or UGT members, a few days before the rebels occupied Madrid. On 23 March Casado sent emissaries to Burgos, the capital of the rebels. Franco would still only accept unconditional surrender. He demanded that the Spanish Republican Air Force surrender by 25 March 1939, and the remainder of the Republican forces surrender by 27 March. A second meeting was held at the Gamonal aerodrome on 25 March 1939, where the Republican Lieutenant Colonel Antonio Garijo was told the pace of surrender was too slow. When the National Defense Council heard the report of this meeting they gave orders for immediate delivery of the Republican aviation. They were too late. Franco had ordered a general offensive to start on the morning on 26 March 1939, the final offensive of the Spanish Civil War. That morning Casado sent a message to Burgos, which was not answered,

National Defense Council to Nationalist Government: This Council [National Defense], which has done everything humanly possible for the benefit of peace with the unconditional support of the people reiterates to the Government that the reaction which the offensive may produce is its main concern, and it hopes that irreparable damage can be avoided when evacuation of responsible people is allowed – otherwise it is the inescapable duty of the Council to resist the advance of those forces.

The council met for the last time on 27 March 1939. That day the council left for Valencia, and Casado told his troops to disarm and offer no resistance to the rebels. The next day Franco's forces entered Madrid. Julián Besteiro and Rafael Sánchez Guerra were the only two members of the council who remained in the capital when rebel troops entered the city. They received the first indictment for war crimes to be tried by military tribunals. By 31 March 1939, the rebels had control of all Spanish territory.

== Aftermath ==
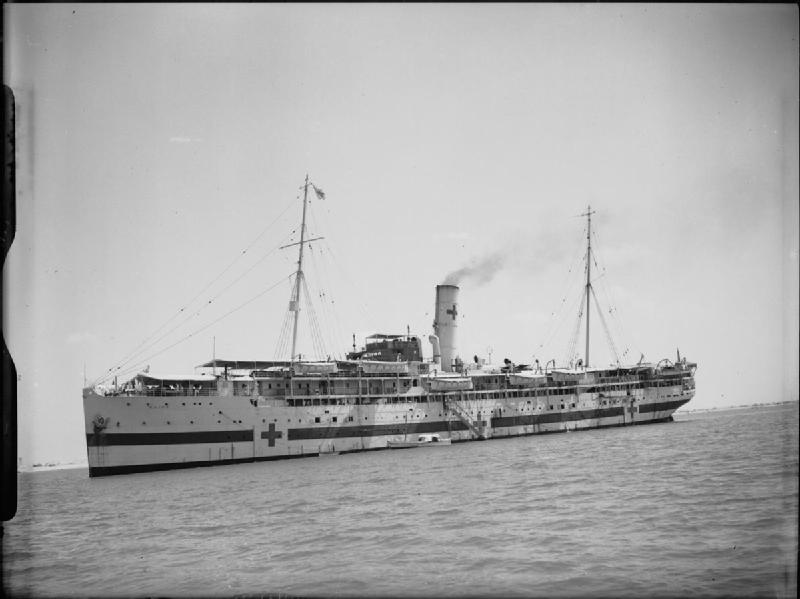
The British hospital ship RFA Maine, which evacuated many members of the council

The council members reached Valencia on 28 March 1939. The British consul directed them to Gandia, where a British ship was waiting. When they reached that port they found a chaotic situation with masses of refugees attempting to board the ship. The refugees were persuaded to go on to Alicante, where they were told they would find British merchant ships that could take them. At dawn on 30 March 1939, Casado, with 143 men, 19 women and 2 children, boarded the British ship HMS Galatea at Gandia. They were transferred to the British hospital ship RFA Maine on 1 April 1939, which reached Marseille on 3 April 1939. From there they went on to Great Britain.

Miaja left Valencia by plane to Oran in the early morning of 30 March 1939. He moved from there to Marseille, and then to Paris. His family had previously been exchanged, and he sailed with them to Mexico in May 1939. Franco's authorities sentenced him to 15 years of exile and the loss of his nationality. He died in Mexico in 1958.

Casado was allowed to land in Britain, where he published a book in English in which he justified his actions. During World War II (1939–1945) he worked for the BBC. After the war he moved to Venezuela. He returned to Spain in 1961. He was tried, but was absolved in 1965.

Carrillo stayed in Britain during the war, where he continued to attack Negrín, then moved to France and was a member of the executive committee of the PSOE. In his last years he lived in Belgium, where he died in 1963. Del Val and González also took refuge in England during the war.

Moreira also escaped on the Galatea. He was sentenced to death in absentia. He worked as a waiter in a Spanish restaurant in London until his death in 1967.

Besteiro was tried by a court martial on 8 July 1939 and sentenced to 30 years. He died in prison in 1940.

== Sources ==
- Alexander, Robert J. (1999). The Anarchists in the Spanish Civil War. Janus Publishing Company. ISBN 978-1-85756-412-9.
- Alía Miranda, Francisco; Valle Calzado, Angel Ramón del; Morales Encinas, Olga M. (2008). La guerra civil en Castilla-La Mancha, 70 años después: actas del Congreso Internacional. Univ de Castilla La Mancha. ISBN 978-84-8427-555-8.
- Alpert, Michael (2008). La guerra civil española en el mar. Editorial Critica. ISBN 978-84-8432-975-6.
- Alpert, Michael (2013-02-28). The Republican Army in the Spanish Civil War, 1936–1939. Cambridge University Press. ISBN 978-1-107-32857-0.
- Álvarez Rey, Leandro (2009). Los Diputados por Andalucía de la Segunda República 1931–1939 (in Spanish). Centro de Estudios Andaluces. ISBN 978-84-613-1326-6.
- Bahamonde, Ángel; Cervera Gil, Javier (1999). Así terminó la Guerra de España. Madrid: Marcial Pons. ISBN 84-95379-00-7.
- Beevor, Antony (2006). The battle for Spain. The Spanish Civil War 1936–1939. London: Penguin Books. ISBN 9780143037651.
- Bolloten, Burnett (1991). The Spanish Civil War: Revolution and Counterrevolution. Univ of North Carolina Press. ISBN 978-0-8078-1906-7.
- Castillo Fernández, Javier; Herrero Pascual, Ana Mª. (2008). "Fondos sobre la Guerra Civil Española en el Archivo General de la Región de Murcia" (PDF). Anales de Documentación. 11. Universidad de Murcia. ISSN 1575-2437.
- Cook, Chris; Stevenson, John (2014-09-19). Longman Handbook of Twentieth Century Europe. Routledge. ISBN 978-1-317-89225-0.
- Graham, Helen (1991-06-28). Socialism and War: The Spanish Socialist Party in Power and Crisis, 1936–1939. Cambridge University Press. ISBN 978-0-521-39257-0.
- Jackson, Gabriel (2010). Juan Negrín: Physiologist, Socialist and Spanish Republican War Leader. Sussex Academic Press. ISBN 978-1-84519-376-8.
- Juliá, Santos; Casanova, Julían; Solé i Sabaté, Josep Maria; Villarroya, Joan; Moreno, Francisco (2006). Víctimas de la guerra civil. Madrid: Ediciones Temas de Hoy.
- Monferrer Catalán, Luis (2007). Odisea en Albión: los republicanos españoles exiliados en Gran Bretaña 1936–1977 (in Spanish). Ediciones de la Torre. ISBN 978-84-7960-386-1.
- Preston, Paul (2006). The Spanish Civil War. Reaction, revolution & revenge. London: Harper Perennial. ISBN 978-0-00-723207-9.
- Romero Salvadó, Francisco J. (2013-03-14). Historical Dictionary of the Spanish Civil War. Scarecrow Press. ISBN 978-0-8108-8009-2.
- Ruiz, Julius (2005). Franco's Justice: Repression in Madrid After the Spanish Civil War. Clarendon Press. ISBN 978-0-19-928183-1.
- Stewart, Jules (2012). Madrid: The History. I.B.Tauris. ISBN 978-1-78076-281-4.
- Thomas, Hugh (2003). The Spanish Civil War. London: Penguin Books. ISBN 978-0-14-101161-5.
- Viñas, Ángel; Hernández Sánchez, Fernando (2009). El desplome de la República (in Spanish). Barcelona. ISBN 978-84-9892-108-3.
