= Guillermo Ascanio =

Spanish politician (1907–1941)

Guillermo Ascanio (1907–1941) was a Communist Party of Spain politician. He fought on the side of the Second Spanish Republic during the Spanish Civil War and tried to prevent Casado's coup of March 1939. After the victory of the Nationalists, he was executed by the government of Francisco Franco in Madrid.

== Biography ==
Ascanio was born in the Gomera town of Vallehermoso on 30 October 1907. Ascanio studied industrial engineering in Germany, later returning to Spain. He would join the Communist Party of Spain (PCE), within which he would carry out intense work. Along with José Miguel Pérez, he was one of the main figures of the Communist Party in the Canary Islands. He published several articles in Spartacus (the publication of the Federación de Trabajadores de La Palma (Federation of Workers of La Palma)) in some of which he came to defend the independence of the Canary Islands with respect to Spain, describing the political-economic situation of the archipelago as "semi-colonial".
