= Julián Besteiro =

Spanish politician (1870–1940)

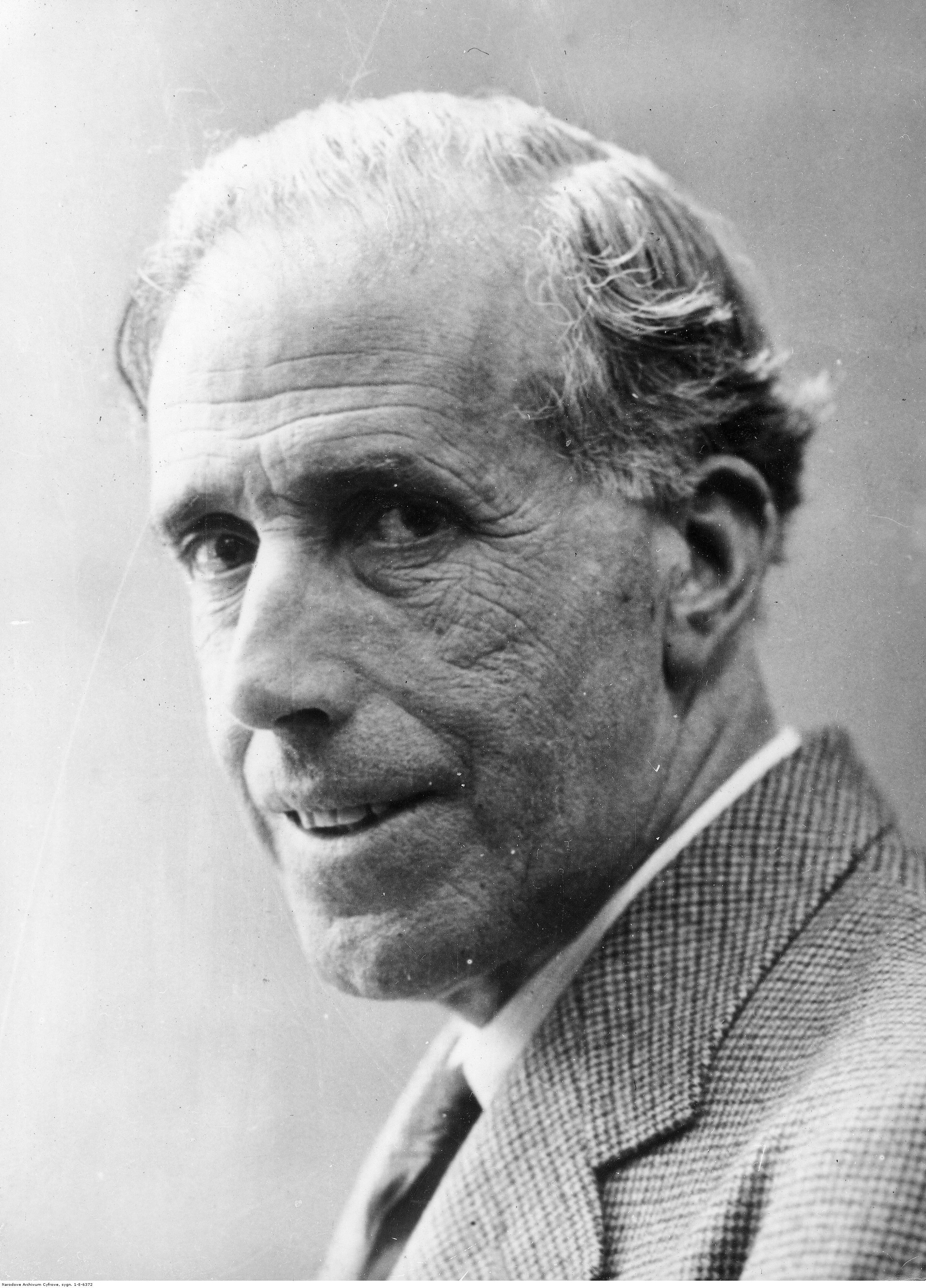
- Julián Besteiro (c. 1935–1939)

President of the Congress of Deputies
- In office 14 July 1931 – 9 October 1933
- Preceded by: Melquíades Álvarez
- Succeeded by: Santiago Alba Bonifaz

President of the Spanish Socialist Workers' Party
- In office 9 December 1925 – 11 July 1931
- Preceded by: Pablo Iglesias
- Succeeded by: Remigio Cabello

President of the UGT
- In office 1925–1934
- Preceded by: Pablo Iglesias
- Succeeded by: Anastasio de Gracia

Member of the Congress of Deputies
- In office 13 March 1918 – 15 September 1923
- Constituency: Madrid
- In office 4 July 1931 – 2 February 1937
- Constituency: Madrid

Personal details
- Born: 21 September 1870 Madrid, Spain
- Died: 27 September 1940 (aged 70) Carmona, Spain
- Resting place: Cementerio Civil of Madrid
- Party: PSOE
- Other political affiliations: Republican Union, Radical Party
- Education: Complutense University of Madrid
- Occupation: University professor

Julián Besteiro Fernández ([xuˈljam besˈtejɾo], 21 September 1870 – 27 September 1940) was a Spanish socialist politician, elected to the Cortes Generales and in 1931 as Speaker of the Constituent Cortes of the Spanish Republic. He also was elected several times to the town council of Madrid. During the same period, he was a university professor of philosophy and logic, and dean of the department at the Complutense University of Madrid. As the leader of the moderate wing of the Spanish Socialist Workers' Party (PSOE), he unsuccessfully tried to reach an agreement with the nationalist faction during the last year of the Civil War. After the defeat, he was imprisoned and died in jail.

== Early life ==
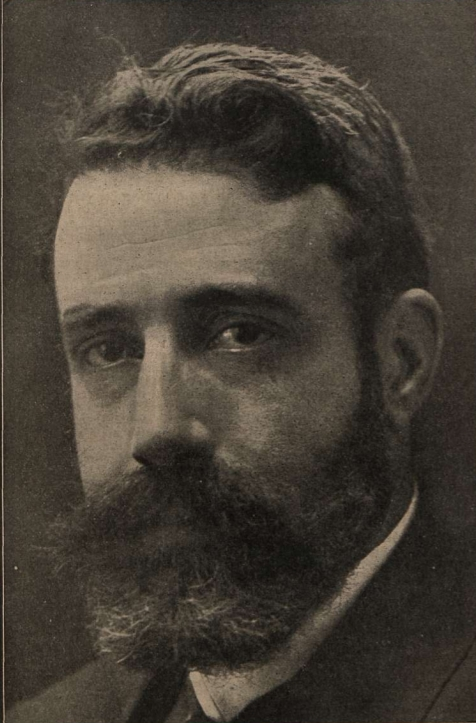
Julián Besteiro in 1912

Born in Madrid, he was educated in the Institución Libre de Enseñanza, and studied in the Faculty of Philosophy and Letters at the Complutense University of Madrid, as well as at the University of Paris in 1896, the Ludwig-Maximilians-Universität München, the Friedrich Wilhelm University of Berlin, and Leipzig University from 1909 to 1910. In 1908, he joined the Partido Radical (Radical Party) established by Alejandro Lerroux.

A member of the Republican Union, he was elected municipal councillor of Toledo on 8 November 1903.

He became a member of the Agrupación Socialista Madrileña (the socialist circle in Madrid) in 1912. That year he was offered the Chair of Fundamental Logic in the Faculty of Philosophy and Letters at the Complutense University of Madrid. Soon after, Besteiro became a member of Unión General de Trabajadores (UGT) trade union, and of the Spanish Socialist Workers' Party (PSOE). In 1913 he married Dolores Cebrián, a professor of physics and natural science at the teachers' training college in Toledo.

In 1917, after the general strike, Besteiro was among many members of the strike committee tried in Madrid; he was convicted and sentenced to life imprisonment. Following his release under the amnesty campaign, he was elected as a member of the town council of Madrid.

The following year, Besteiro was elected to the Cortes (the Spanish Parliament) as member of the Congress of Deputies for Madrid.

During the dictatorship of Miguel Primo de Rivera, Besteiro favored collaboration by the socialists with the leader. Primo de Rivera offered UGT participation in governing the country. To a certain extent, the arrangement in the mid-1920s appeared to be a success. Opinion within the PSOE turned against Besteiro as the Primo de Rivera regime became more unpopular during the economic downturn as part of the Great Depression.

By the mid-1930s, Besteiro became politically isolated in his opinions on collaboration. This was opposed by the republican front established by the Pact of San Sebastián. Bestiero had also opposed the participation of UGT in the 15 December 1930 general strike. At a joint meeting of the PSOE and UGT in February 1931, Besteiro resigned as President of both the party and the union. (Note: Paul Preston writes that Besteiro resigned as president of the union in 1934.)

In 1931, he was elected a councillor of the Madrid town council.

== Second Spanish Republic and the Civil War ==
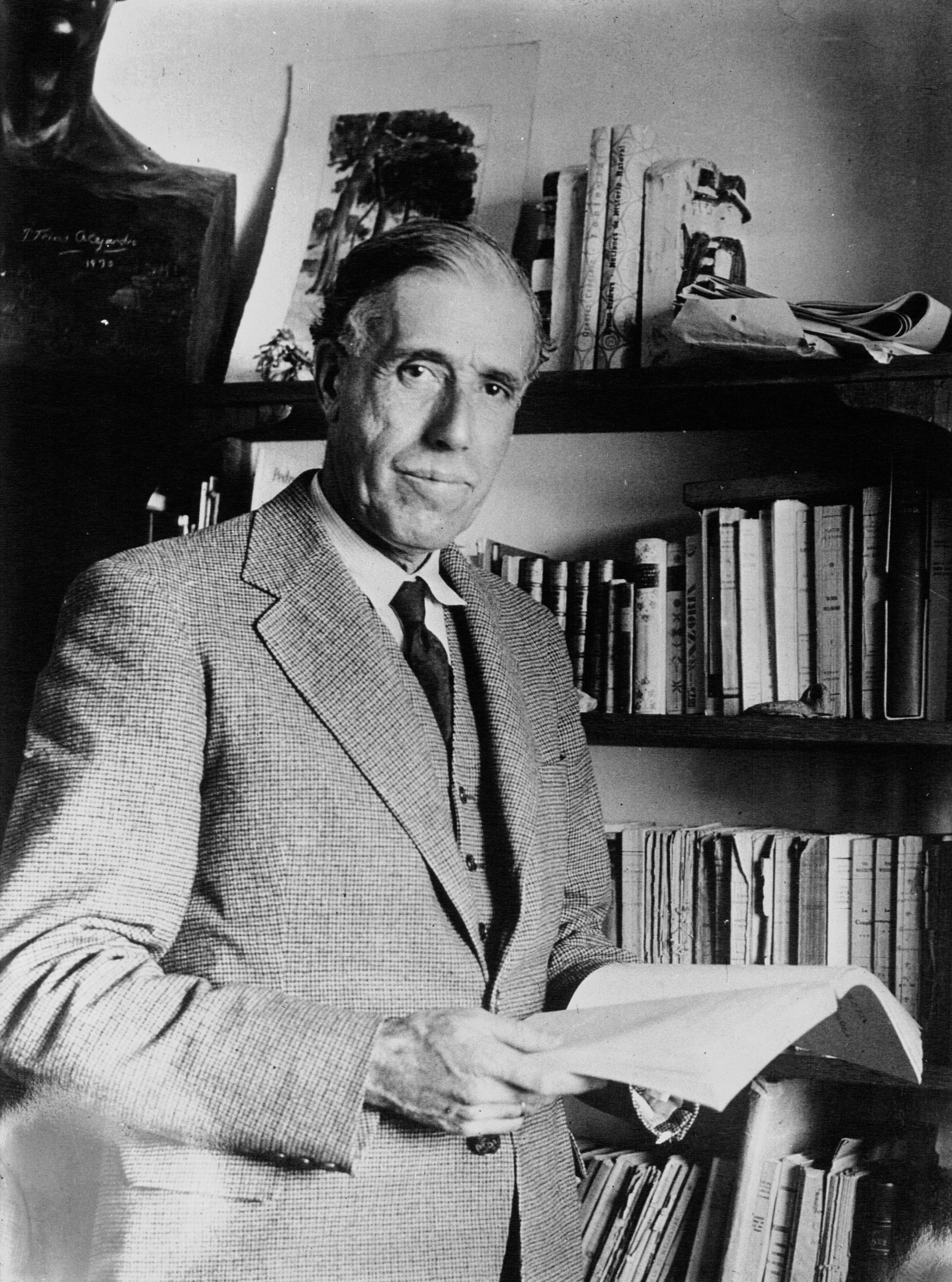
Julian Besteiro in 1931

Still serving in the Cortes Generales after the establishment of the Second Spanish Republic in 1931, Besteiro was elected Speaker of the Constituent Cortes, empowered to draft a new constitution. The Cabinet offered him first the job of state delegate to CAMPSA, the state petrol monopoly, and then the post of Ambassador to France, both of which he rejected. During his period as President of the Cortes, he seemed to become more conservative in his political views. In January 1934, he resigned as President of the UGT.

Opposing the radicalization of the Socialist movement, he disapproved the socialists' taking part in the armed uprising of October 1934. In February 1936, Besteiro won the highest number of votes of any candidate in Madrid in the Popular Front elections.

Throughout this period, Besteiro had continued to work at the Complutense University of Madrid as a Dean of the Faculty of Philosophy and Letters, as well as to carry out his duties as a parliamentary deputy and councillor of the town council in Madrid. After the Spanish Civil War broke out in 1936, and against the urgings of friends, he refused to leave Madrid and seek exile.

Manuel Azaña, the Spanish Republican president, chose Besteiro as the representative to the coronation of the new British King George VI in London on 12 May 1937. Besteiro believed it was to be a peace mission. There he met with Sir Anthony Eden to seek British aid in ending the war, which had attracted German and Russian support of the opposing sides, but no significant results followed. After the failure of his mission in London, Besteiro returned to work on the town council of Madrid but withdrew from other official public life. He stopped attending the Agrupación Socialista Madrileña and the parliamentary group meetings.

With the news of the fall of Barcelona on 26 January 1939 and Azaña's resignation as President of the Republic, Besteiro decided to work to achieve peace and stop the resistance. He contacted Colonel Segismundo Casado. On 5 March Besteiro announced the creation of the National Defence Council (Consejo Nacional de Defensa). The uprising against the government of Juan Negrín and its Communist Party of Spain allies succeeded, at the cost of nearly 2,000 lives.

== Death ==
After the fall of Madrid to the Nationalists on 28 March 1939, Besteiro was arrested by Francoist forces. On 8 July he faced a court martial and was sentenced to thirty years. He was imprisoned first in the Trappist monastery in Dueñas, Palencia, until the end of August 1939. He was transferred to the prison of Carmona, Andalusia. He died in prison the following year.

Besteiro was buried in the Cementerio Civil of Madrid.
