= Spanish coup of March 1939 =

Spanish coup d'état

Spanish coup of 1939
- Part of Final offensive of the Spanish Civil War
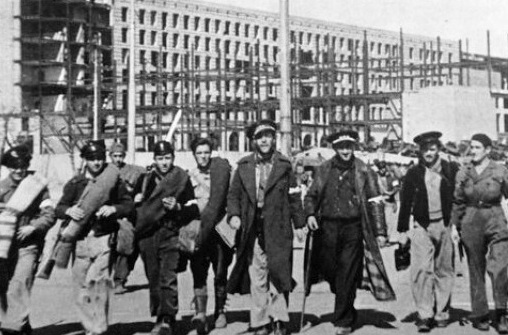
- Casadista troops in Madrid
Date	March 5–12, 1939
Location	Central-Eastern Spain
Result	Casadista victory: Fall of Negrín's government; Effective end of the Spanish Civil War

Belligerents
Loyalists (Negrinistas)	Rebels (Casadistas, CND)

Commanders and leaders
Juan Negrín (surrendered) (AWOL); Luis Barceló (executed); Guillermo Ascanio (surrendered) Antonio Ortega (executed); Francisco Galán (surrendered)	Segismundo Casado; José Miaja; Cipriano Mera; Wenceslao Carrillo; Julián Besteiro; Manuel Matallana

Strength
Minority of army and administration	Majority of army and administration

Political support
Communists	Liberals, Anarchists, Socialists, Moderates

Casualties and losses
- Unclear; KIA estimates range from 250 to 2,000

Spanish coup of March 1939, in historiography often referred to as Casado's coup (Spanish: Golpe de Casado), was a coup d'état organized in the Republican zone against the government of Juan Negrín. It was carried out by the military with support of the Anarchists and a major faction of the Socialists; its leader was commander of the Army of the centre, Segismundo Casado. The conspirators viewed the Negrín government as a hardly veiled Communist dictatorship. Most concluded that the government-endorsed strategy of unyielding resistance against the Nationalists would produce nothing but further deaths and sufferings while the war had already been lost. The military and some politicians intended the coup as a first step towards opening peace negotiations with the Nationalists; for the Anarchists and Socialists the priority was to remove the Communists from power.

The coup began on March 5, when rebels declared the setup of their own quasi-government, Consejo Nacional de Defensa (CND), based in Madrid. Following few hours of discussions the Negrín government, at the time based near the town of Elda at the Levantine coast, decided that any resistance was pointless; the following day they left Spain. The rebels easily took control of all provincial capitals with very little or no fighting recorded. The exception was Madrid, where the local Communist executive, unaware of the PCE Political Bureau decision to avoid bloodshed, mounted resistance. Communist-controlled units recalled from the frontline took control of most of Madrid and on March 9 they were closing in on CND headquarters. However, Anarchist-controlled units also recalled from the frontline entered the city on March 10 and in 3 days they ensured the triumph of the rebels. During the next 3 weeks the Republican zone was ruled by the CND.

== Background ==
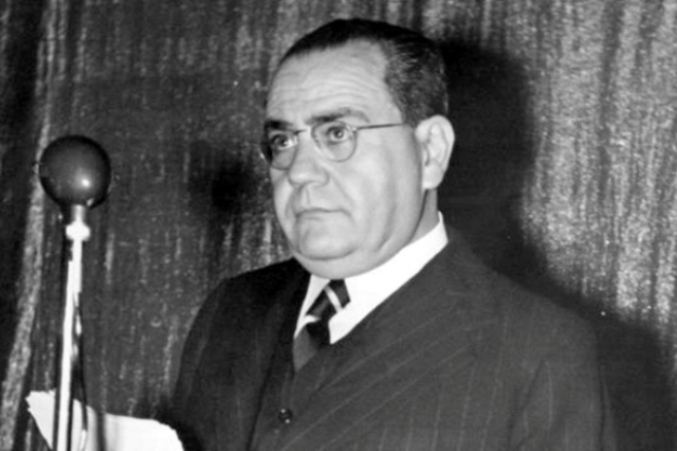
Juan Negrín

Throughout 1938, many key Republicans developed doubts about Prime Minister Juan Negrín's strategy to keep on fighting; the Communist Party, acting in the interest of the Soviet Union, was identified as its chief proponent. They were increasingly convinced that the war was already lost, and that further resistance would only produce unnecessary deaths, sufferings and destruction. Until 1939, however, the theory that the Republic should commence negotiations with the Nationalists to end the conflict was advanced using regular internal political mechanisms. President Manuel Azaña talked to this end with the prime minister; Socialist leader Julián Besteiro lobbied for his cabinet which would then engage in peace talks.

In early February, top military commanders tentatively agreed that in case Negrín – at the time trapped in isolated Catalonia – returns to the central zone, he should be removed from power. The conspiracy involved commander of all armed forces in the central-southern zone army General José Miaja, his chief of staff General Manuel Matallana, commander of the Army of Levante General Leopoldo Menéndez and commander of the Army of the Centre Colonel Segismundo Casado. Around the same time 3 major Anarchist organisations, CNT, FAI and FJL, tried to sound Miaja on creating a “united anti-fascist organization” which would assume power in the central zone; its purpose was not that much commencing peace talks, but rather sidetracking the Communists. The proposal was followed up by talks between Casado and the Anarchist military commander of the IV. Army Corps, Cipriano Mera.

Since January, Casado maintained contacts with Nationalist agents active in Madrid; on February 15 he received confirmation that Francisco Franco was ready to enter talks on Republican surrender. From then onwards during the following 3 weeks there was continuous communication between Casado and the Nationalists; the former was already determined to organize a coup against Negrín – who returned to the central zone – and commence peace talks. Franco headquarters pledged that there would be no repression against Republicans who were not guilty of crimes; the Nationalists demanded also that an anti-Negrín coup be mounted as soon as possible, possibly already in February 1939.

== Conspiracy buildup ==
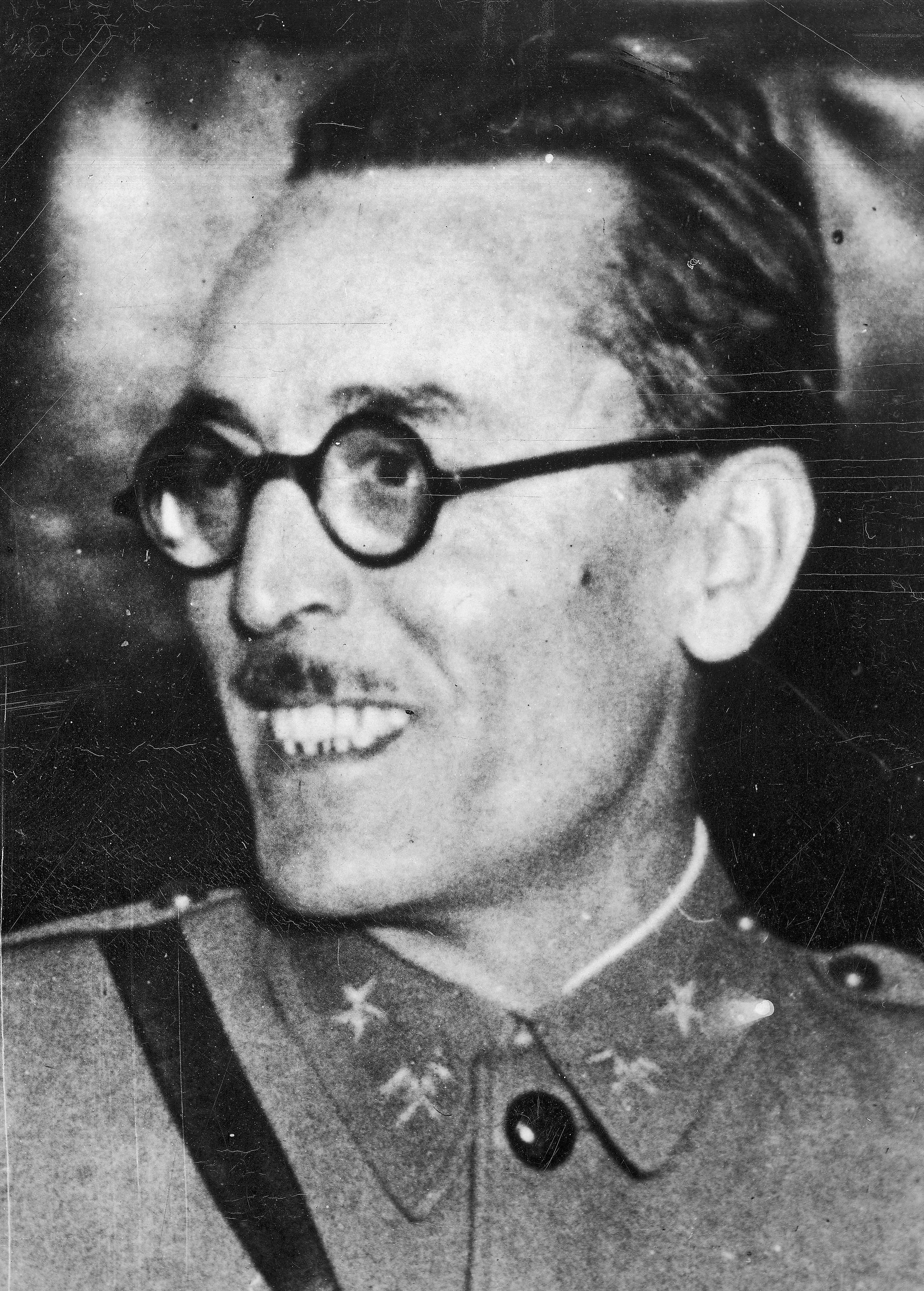
Segismundo Casado

In early 1939, the Anarchists were firmly opposed to what they saw as an almost unveiled Communist dictatorship in the Republican zone. The party leader Juan García Oliver, since early February on exile in Paris, declared that it was necessary to remove Negrín. Similar position was adopted by the Madrid Comité Regional de Defensa (CRD); though technically a sub-unit within larger Anarchist structure, in practice it emerged as the key Anarchist decision-making body. Its leaders were José García Pradas, Manuel Salgado Moreira and Eduardo Val Bescós, who acted as the party executive troika. They had overwhelming support of the wide array of Anarchist organisations; a stormy plenary meeting of February 24 confirmed vehement hostility to the Communists and endorsed labors against “any sort of dictatorship”, though it remained inconclusive as to seeking peace with the Nationalists.

The Socialists leaders Indalecio Prieto and Francisco Largo Caballero crossed to France in January 1939 and decided not to return to Spain; they were also bitterly critical of Negrín and PCE. The PSOE politician of most prestigious standing who resided in the Republican zone was Juan Besteiro, since January 1939 engaged in cautious talks with military commanders on forming a local peace-seeking power structure. The key Socialist decision-making body was Agrupación Socialista Madrileña, with personalities of Besteiro, Wenceslao Carrillo, Ángel Pedrero García and Carlos Rubiera. Since February 27 they entered into direct talks with Casado on setting up an anti-Negrín government. Like the Anarchists, also the Socialists were firmly pitted against the Communists and somewhat divided as to peace talks with Franco.

The third component of the conspiracy were the military. The highest-ranking officer aware of though not particularly active in the plot was Miaja, freshly promoted to a somewhat titular position of overall commander of the Republican army, navy and air force. More real power rested with an active conspirator general Manuel Matallana, recently nominated to commander of the Republican army. Key local commanders were Real Admiral Miguel Buiza Fernández-Palacios (navy), Menéndez (Army of Levante), and Casado; Casado was clearly the leader and the moving spirit behind the plot. There were also key commanders unaware of the plot: Colonel Domingo Moriones (Army of Andalusia), Colonel Antonio Escobar (Army of Extremadura), and General Ignacio Hidalgo de Cisneros (air force commander).

== Governmental reaction ==
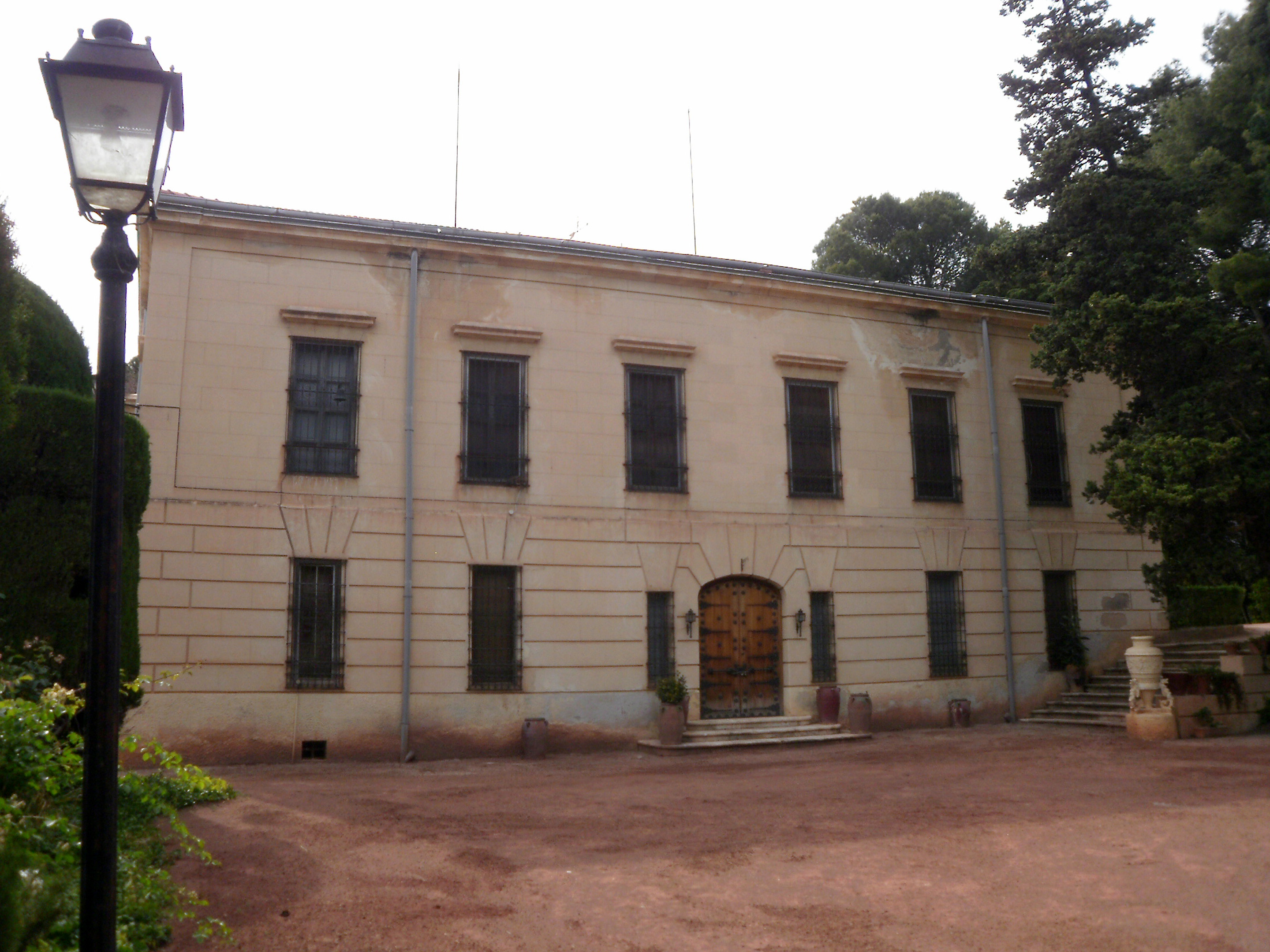
Posición Yuste today

Since returning to Madrid on February 11, Negrín and his closest collaborators were perfectly aware of defeatist spirit, prevailing among the top military and administration officials. As a few were considered ready to capitulate, some Communist leaders suggested either appointing political commissars to top army structures, which would require their co-signature under any order, or deposing them; the list of those suspected included Miaja and Casado. For reasons which are not clear Negrín did not implement these plans; instead, for some 2 weeks he kept meeting top commanders every few days, either in Madrid or in Levantine locations, as he was touring the Mediterranean coast.

Since mid-February, Negrín was being informed by the army intelligence SIM about highly suspicious meetings taking place in Madrid between some key military on the one hand, and shady figures possibly related to Nationalist espionage network, politicians and foreign diplomats on the other. However, no measures have been taken; the intended one, like deposition of the Madrid SIM commander Pedrero, were blocked by the Army of the centre. On February 25 or shortly afterwards Negrín settled in what became known as Posición Yuste, provisional headquarters near Elda in the province of Alicante, some 30 km from the harbor and over 300 km from Madrid. It might have been a preventive measure aimed against an attempt to arrest Negrín; however, it left the Madrid conspirators free to act. He was last in Madrid on February 27.

On March 2 at Posición Yuste Negrín held the meeting with top military, including Miaja, Matallana, Casado and Buiza. He pondered upon replacing Casado either with Enrique Líster or with commander of the III Corps Bueno, but eventually he did nothing. On March 3 the government made public a number of military nominations; trusted high Communist officers were posted to key positions at the Levantine coast, especially in the provinces of Murcia and Alicante. The same day Negrín called key military, including Miaja, Casado and Matallana, to a meeting to be held again at Posición Yuste on March 5. All of them played for time; in fact, final touches were being added to the plan of the coup.

== Cartagena ==
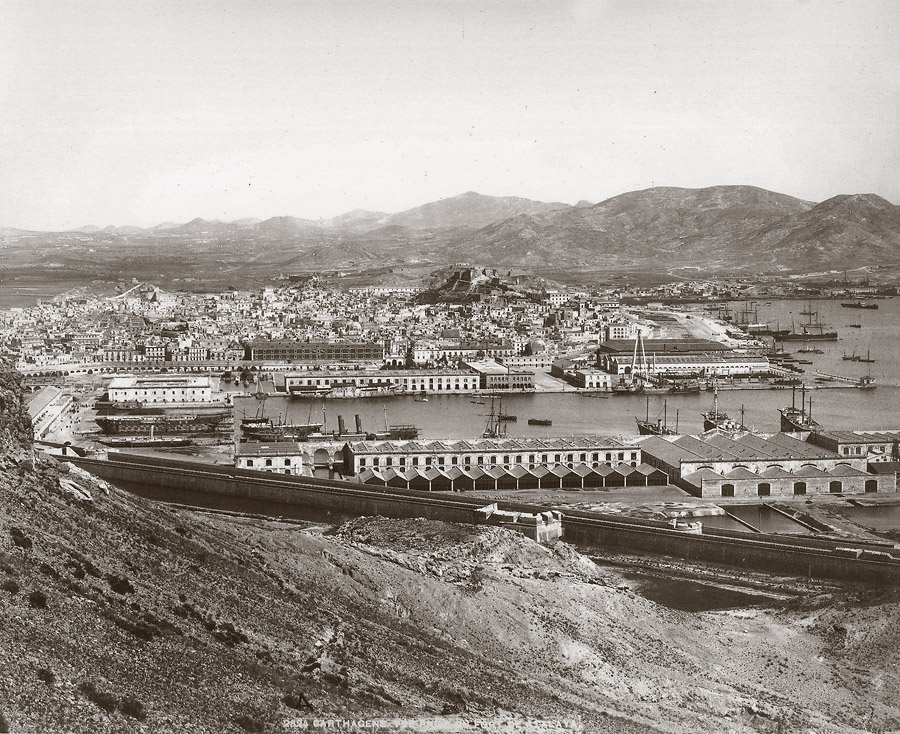
Cartagena naval base

The main Republican naval base was Cartagena, home to almost the entire Republican navy; unlike the army, in early March it was a force fully comparable to the Nationalist navy with 3 light cruisers, 10 destroyers and a number of other vessels, including submarines and torpedo boats. Since late February Negrín developed doubts about the navy commander, rear admiral Buiza, and commissar of the Cartagena base, Socialist Bruno Alonso. As the navy was probably assigned vital role in any Negrín plans for massive evacuation from Levantine ports, he decided to ensure there would be no surprises. On March 3 he replaced Alonso with the Communist colonel Francisco Galán, who arrived in Cartagena to assume command on March 4.

Some historians claim that Casado and Buiza planned to take the fleet out to sea as part of the coup. Arrival of Galán might have thwarted these plans, and in the afternoon of March 4 he was detained by local conspirators, though not clear whether on Buiza's orders. Shortly afterwards and aware of apparent breach among the Republicans, the Nationalist conspirators commenced action in the city. Sporadic three-way combat broke out. Buiza decided to prioritize fighting the Nationalists over fighting the Negrín loyalists and got Galán released. However, early on March 5, he ordered the fleet to make preparations to sail.

During the day situation in Cartagena became shambolic. Nationalist rebels controlled the coastal battery and radio; they demanded the fleet to sail out, though some preferred to open fire at the vessels. Buiza controlled the fleet and partially the harbor, but was pressed hard by the anti-Negrinistas. Loyalist governmental units assembled at the outskirts of the city entered Cartagena and amidst fighting with Nationalist rebels advanced towards the harbor. Nationalist air force bombed the port, mistakenly fired at by own rebel Nationalist coastal battery. Franco ordered his troopships from Castellón and Málaga to sail to Cartagena. Amidst total chaos, around mid-day of March 5 the Republican navy sailed out to open seas. During the afternoon troops loyal to the government took control of the city and the port.

== Consejo Nacional de Defensa ==
According to some sources the coup was initially planned for March 4, precipitated by Negrín's nominations of March 3; they were perceived as full Communist takeover. Until the very last minute composition of the rebel executive, to be named Council of National Defense (CND), was unclear. In late February, Casado suggested that Melchor Rodríguez be its president, but he declined; also Besteiro followed suit. When in the afternoon of March 5 key conspirators gathered in the former building of the Ministry of Finance to make a radio broadcast, the CND composition was still not agreed. It was eventually decided that the presidency would go to Miaja, who at the time was in Valencia; following further nervous discussion on personalities and organisations, names were agreed shortly before the final broadcast, made on 10 PM. It was clear to everyone gathered, however, that the coup leader was Casado.

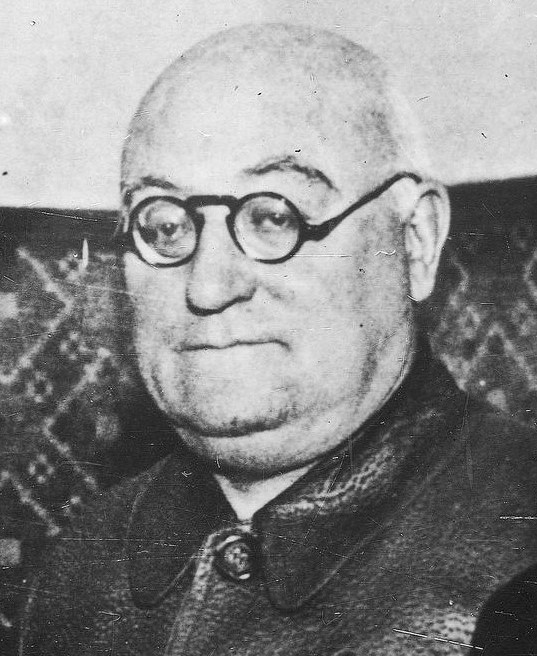
José Miaja

position	office holder	representing
President	José Miaja Menant	army
Foreign Affairs/Vice-president	Julián Besteiro Fernández	Partido Socialista Obrero Español
Interior	Wenceslao Carrillo Alonso-Forjador	Agrupación Socialista Madrileña
Defense	Segismundo Casado López	army
Finance	Manuel González Marín	Confederación Nacional del Trabajo
Labor	Antonio Pérez García	Unión General de Trabajadores
Justice	Miguel San Andrés	Izquierda Republicana
Education & Health	José del Río Rodríguez	Unión Republicana
Communications & Public Works	Eduardo Val Bescós	Confederación Nacional del Trabajo

The broadcast consisted of the official communiqué and addresses by Besteiro, Mera, San Andrés and Casado. All were phrased rather vaguely in grandiloquent terms; all focused on lambasting Negrín and his government as incompetent and serving foreign (i.e. presumably Soviet) interests, presiding over the great national disaster. They did not contain any explicit references to opening peace talks with the Nationalists, though a number of times they contained phrases about “saving innocent masses” or “humanitarian duties”; however, the speakers also declared themselves anti-fascists and at some points advocated resistance. Last words of Casado's speech were addressed to Franco: “in your hands, not in ours, is peace or war”.

== Governmental response ==
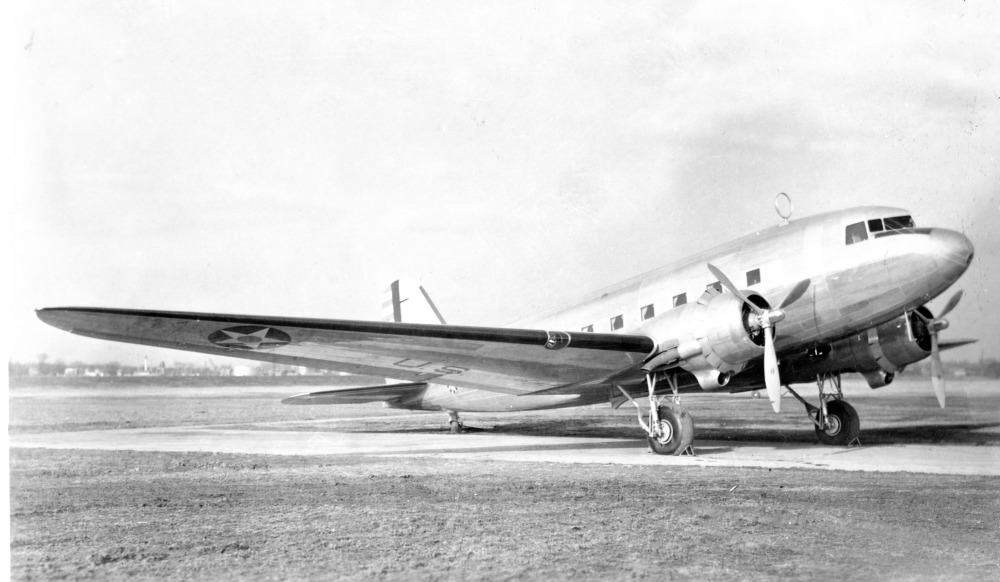
A DC-2 flew Negrín out of Spain

Negrín and his government listened to the CND radio broadcast when at Posición Yuste. The prime minister immediately called Casado and a flurry of other telephone conversations followed. Negrín demanded explanations, which Casado refused to give. A series of other phone calls revealed that except commanders of Army of Extremadura and Army of Andalusia, who seemed loyal even though somewhat ambiguous, most other local military leaders tended to side with the rebels. Santiago Garcés Arroyo, the nationwide SIM commander present at Posición Yuste, called Pedrero and ordered him to arrest Casado, which he refused to do. At some point during the night most members of the government, including the prime minister, concluded that there was no point in mounting resistance against CND. Some sources claim that either Negrín or Antonio Cordón García tried to arrange with Casado formal handover of powers, principally to ensure that the Republican government is not entirely compromised internationally.

Early on March 6, Negrín received information that the fleet would not return to Cartagena and was heading to Algeria; this effectively quashed any hope of massive, controlled evacuation from Levantine ports. There were also news that civil governor of Murcia sided with the rebels, that there might be CND-loyal troops sent to capture Negrín and the government at Posición Yuste, that the near airfield in Monòver might soon get overrun and that the port in Alicante, still controlled by the government, might be cut off. In the morning Negrín decided to leave Spain and ordered for aircraft to be ready at Monóver.

The idea of organizing resistance was still nurtured by at least some members of the nationwide PCE executive and Komintern, who resided in their headquarters known as Posición Dakar, few kilometers from Posición Yuste (the PCE leader José Díaz left Spain in November 1938 to undergo medical treatment in the USSR). Togliatti suggested that last effort to secure some sort of ceasefire agreement should be made with CND; it was a device to gain time in order to ascertain the scale of support for the rebels. Pedro Checa sent emissaries out across the central zone to the same end. Some tried to convince Negrín, who before flying out visited Posición Dakar, but to no avail. Negrín tried to issue a radio broadcast which would declare the need to hand over power in constitutional manner, but no transmitter was available. Around mid-day on March 6 Negrín and his government flew to France. Some in PCE planned last-ditch bulwark of resistance between Albacete, Valencia and Cartagena, but eventually the executive made a last-minute decision to avoid further bloodshed, which effectively forbade fighting CND, and to go underground; most of its members flew out on March 6, too. Checa was left to communicate the decisions adopted; as there was no radio connection available, he sent an emissary to Madrid.

== Coup in Madrid ==
CND deployed two divisions and some other units led by trusted commanders in Madrid. However, Guillermo Ascanio, the loyalist commander of the 8. Division deployed west of the city, abandoned the frontline and on March 6 seized northern and partiallty central quarters of Madrid. Also tank and other units stationed in reserve near Torrejón de Ardoz remained loyal and headed towards the centre from the east. On March 7 the major rebel command centre called Posicion Jaca was overrun; most CND members left Madrid for Tarrancón. On March 8 the advancing loyalists were already few kilometres from Ministerio de Hacienda, the Casado headquarters. On March 9 both sides engaged in negotiations which produced informal ceasefire. On March 10 Anarchist-controlled rebel reinforcements, which previously held the frontline on Guadalajara/Soria borders and were recalled by Cipriano Mera, reached the outskirts of Madrid from the east; they penetrated into eastern districts of Madrid. On March 11 they seized control over the centre, and on March 12 last islands of loyalist resistance were suffocated.

=== Military situation and rebel plans ===
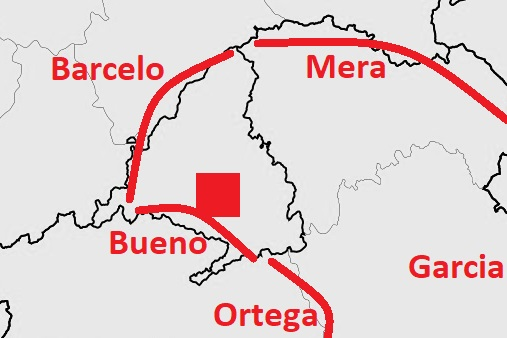
Army of the Centre dispositions and Corps commanders, March 1939

Out of 5 army corps operational near Madrid and subordinated to Casado as head of Army of the centre, 3 were commanded by Communists or their sympathizers. The I. Corps, holding the frontline in Sierra de Guadarrama, was headed by colonel Luis Barceló Jover; the II. Corps, holding the frontline in Casa de Campo and directly west of Madrid, was headed by colonel Emilio Bueno Núñez del Prado; the III. Corps, holding the frontline south of Madrid bordering the province of Toledo, was headed by colonel Antonio Ortega Gutiérrez. Beyond the Communist control was the IV. Corps, which manned the frontline north-east of Madrid, along the borders of the Guadalajara province with the province of Soria; it was commanded by an Anarchist, Cipriano Mera. The XVII Corps, which remained in reserve, was commanded by colonel Carlos García Vallejo, who was not associated with any specific party.

In total, Communist-related officers commanded 3 out of 5 corps, 12 out of 18 divisions, and 28 out of 50 brigades; also some 45% of staff officers from brigade to corps level were in the Communist orbit. However, out of 73 political commissars (brigade to corps) only 27 were PCE members; 21 were related to Socialist PSOE and 17 to the Anarchist CNT.

The plotters ensured there were military units commanded by trusted officers present in the city. The most important was 65. Division, in direct reserve of the Army of the centre. Commanded by a socialist Valentín Gutiérrez de Miguel, it was deployed in the districts of Chamartín and Castellana and its staff was located in the Nuevos Ministerios quarter. In direct reserve there was also 2. Assault Division, commanded by a socialist Piñeroa; it took positions in the quarters of Salamanca and Chamberí. A unit under the Anarchist command was 70. Brigade (part of 14. Division within the IV. Corps), deployed along the line from Alameda de Osuna across Ciudad Lineál towards the city centre. The 8. and 152. brigades of the Carabineros, also controlled by the Socialists, stationed in south-eastern districts of Madrid.

=== March 5, 1939 ===
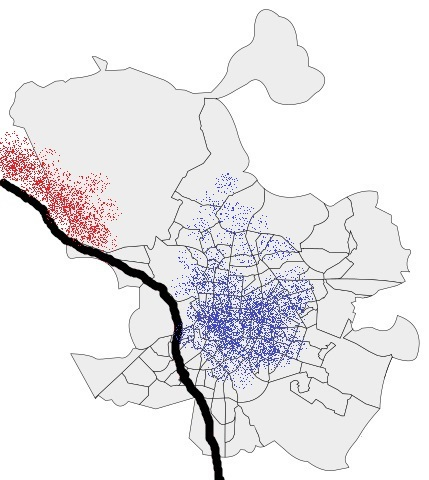
as of late March 5

Having heard the radio broadcast of Consejo Nacional de Defensa in the evening of March 5, the Communist leaders present in Madrid gathered in the PCE operational headquarters. It was located in so-called Villa Eloisa in the north-eastern suburb of Ciudad Lineál, already beyond the administrative city limits; Villa was some 6 km in straight line from the former Ministry of Finance building, the headquarters of the rebels.

There was no clear leader in the PCE Madrid executive; some point to Vicente Pertegás as the man who effectively took command of Communist actions in the days to come. Two senior local party men Arturo Jiménez and head of the military section Domingo Girón departed to El Pardo at north-western outskirts of Madrid, home to general staff of the II. Corps and the nearest one of all corps HQ sites; their intention was to convince colonel Bueno to form a force which would enter Madrid and crush the rebels. However, Bueno vacillated; Jiménez and Girón returned to Villa Eloisa. Girón was then asked to contact Barceló; however, on his way he was detained by rebel troops and incarcerated. Another attempt was directed at Guillermo Ascanio Moreno, a zealous Communist and commander of the 8. Division, subordinate of Bueno.

PCE envoys from Villa Eloisa had some trouble reaching El Pardo, HQ of Ascanio and distant by some 12 km; northern suburbs of Madrid like Fuencarral were also patrolled by CND units. However, prior to being contacted by PCE envoys Ascanio decided to take action himself. Some sources suggest that during the night he withdrew from the frontline near Majadahonda and Aravaca the sub-units which he did not think indispensable in case of a would-be Nationalist attack; others claim he withdrew all 3 brigades (18., 44. and 111.) which formed his 8. Division and directed them south-east, across all Madrid towards the Ministry of Economics near Puerta del Sol, which Ascanio rightly supposed to have been headquarters of CND.

=== March 6, 1939 ===
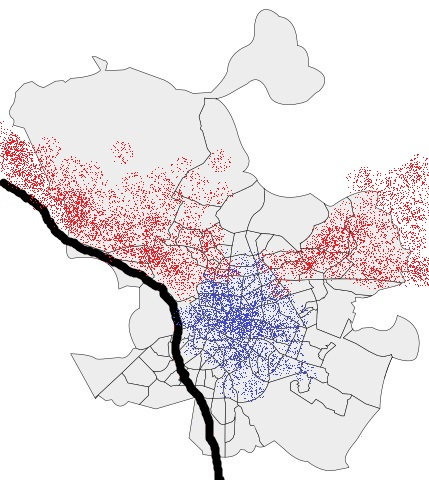
as of late March 6

Ascanio did not head his Division and moved to Villa Eloisa; there he was nominated the military commander of operations aimed at crushing the rebel troops. His intention was to mobilize units from Barceló's and Ortega's corps and with the pincer movement from the north and from the south seize control of Madrid. However, communication with trusted commanders of particular units was shaky; also the attitude adopted by some leading officers was ambiguous. On the other hand, Ascanio managed to win over commanders of the tank unit in Torrejón de Ardoz and these of armored trains, stationed east and north-east of Madrid.

In the morning the loyalist 18. Brigade (from 8. Division) reached Cuatro Caminos, a northern district of Madrid just 4 km away from the CND headquarters; it was commanded by a zealous Communist and former MAOC militant, Pedro Fernández. The unit was opposed by 112. Mixed Brigade, part of the 65. Division; following some combat the Ascanio's men prevailed and reached the northern side of Calle de Ríos Rosas. Around mid-day Chamartín was already controlled by the loyalists. Around that time head of the II. Corps Bueno decided to take sides and also declared himself aligned with the loyalists. Ascanio re-assumed command of the 8. Division, which was already almost in full force in north-central Madrid. The unit changed direction of its assault and instead of pushing south, it started to advance east, towards so-called Posición Jaca, HQ of the Army of the Centre where Ascanio expected to besiege Casado. At that time Barceló (I. Corps) and Ortega (III. Corps) remained passive and their position was unclear.

In the afternoon Casado asked Mera to go to Posición Jaca and assess the situation. Mera found it very difficult, especially that loyalist armored units from Torrejón were approaching also from the east. In the early evening, he managed to call the staff of his IV. Corps in Alcalá de Henares, some 18 km east of Posición Jaca, and ordered to send reinforcements. They failed to materialize before midnight and defense mounted by the Carabineros brigade started to disintegrate; some members of the general staff withdrew towards the city centre.

=== March 7, 1939 ===
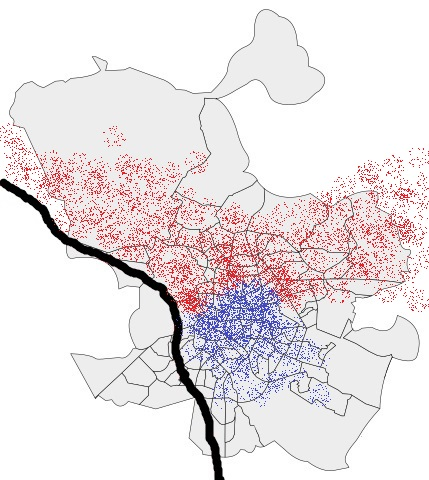
as of late March 7

Early, resistance offered by Carabineros and units of 70. Brigade (another reserve unit at disposal of the Army of the Centre command) at Posición Jaca collapsed and the bunkers were overrun by the loyalists. 3 colonels of the general staff were taken prisoner. In the morning, the advancing column proceeded towards the city centre and engaged in combat near Puente de Ventas.

42. Brigade (part of 7. Division from II. Corps) under command of a Communist Manuel Fernández Cortinas manned the frontline at Casa de Campo; on orders from Bueno the unit left its positions and also headed towards the city centre from the west. At the time Cortinas was trying to win over the commander of the neighboring 40. Brigade (also part of 7. Division), José Sánchez; eventually the brigade staff tilted the decision in favor of the loyalists. Both brigades were moving south-east along the left bank of the Manzanares river. In the afternoon both units were approaching Palacio Real and Teatro de la Opera, key objects for the rebels; the former hosted a telephone exchange, and the latter served as giant storage place for arms and munitions.

Somewhat less successful was the loyalist counter-offensive from the east. The plan was that the troops were to join the 42. Brigade near Plaza de Cibeles, but advancing from Canillejas towards the district of Ventas, the loyalists were bogged in heavy combat and failed to make progress. In the afternoon Barceló, who decided to support the loyalists and was nominated (or self-nominated) head of loyalist Army of the centre, appeared at Posición Jaca; he interrogated prisoners and gave some orders.

Though initial impact of the loyalist counter-offensive slowed down, they kept progressing and were approaching the rebels from 3 directions: north-west, north and north-east. Despite attempts to deploy reinforcements, the CND members were in increasing danger; most members of the body, including Miaja but excluding Casado, later in the day left Madrid and set their new headquarters in Tarrancón, some 80 km south-east of the capital. During the night, the loyalists took control over Palacio Real and Teatro de la Opera.

=== March 8, 1939 ===
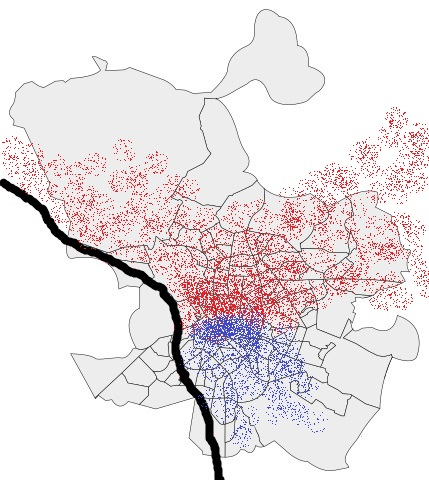
as of late March 8

In the morning, the column led by Cortinas departed from surroundings of Palacio Real and headed east, towards Paseo de la Castellana; as other elements of the 7. Division advanced from the north along the Paseo, the intention was to converge upon defenders from the 65. Division from two directions. By mid-day the loyalist troops progressed until Plaza de Cibeles. The rebel troops started to wear white armbands on left hand to get distinguished from the loyalists.

Also during the morning and early afternoon, the loyalist units advancing from north-east have finally seized control over Ventas, partially thanks to the 8. Brigade of the Carabineros, which changed sides and joined the Communist-controlled units. Proceeding along Calle de Goya, later that day they joined forces with units advancing from the north at Puerta de Alcalá.

The rebel units which borne the brunt of the Communist-controlled counter-offensive across the centre of Madrid were mostly Socialist units from the 65. and 2. Assault Division. Particular role was played by the Guardia de Asalto colonel Armando Alvárez, who emerged as the key commander who co-ordinated the defense.

During the afternoon the position of the rebels became dire. Their headquarters at Ministerio de Hacienda was some 1.5 km from nearest loyalist units; though at the time the way south was controlled by the Casadistas, there was real threat that their command centre might be cut off any minute. Loyalist artillery pieces, deployed at Puerta de Alcalá, opened fire and started shelling the buildings of Ministerio de Hacienda.

=== March 9, 1939 ===
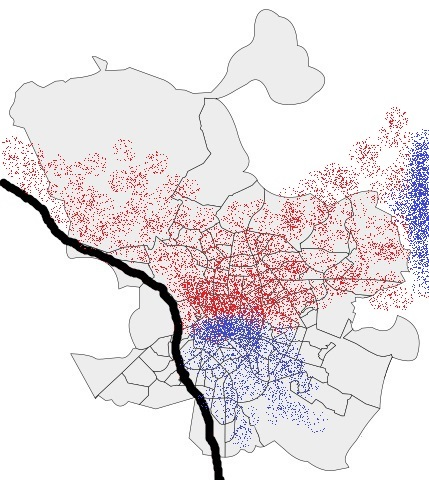
as of late March 9

During the night the Madrid Communist command centre in Villa Eloisa was reached by envoys from the party national headquarters in Elda, in the province of Alicante. They carried the orders to stop fighting and to prepare for either evacuation or going to clandestine activities; the news broke out also that the PCE executive had left Spain on March 6–7, and that except Madrid, the Casadistas triumphed in all the Republican zone.

The Madrid PCE executive was left somewhat bewildered; a heated debate ensued. Eventually most members of the local party command decided to comply with the instructions. One source claims that an offer was submitted to CND with the suggestion to exchange prisoners and possibly PCE taking a seat in CND. Another version claims that the offer of ceasefire was produced by head of the III Corps Ortega, who despite his Communist affiliations remained neutral and mediated between CND and PCE; according to this perspective, Casado intended to gain time before the reinforcements arrive. Effectively the mid-day of the 9. of March produced a ceasefire, with both sides re-organizing their units and consolidating their position.

Jesús Hernández, member of the Madrid PCE executive, refused to accept the party instructions. With a group of co-workers he declared forming of a new PCE politburo, effectively rejecting the authority of PCE leadership, who at the time were already either in France or in Algeria anyway. He issued a belligerent manifesto calling the commissars and commanders not to relinquish powers.

Nationalist officers commanding at Casa de Campo and around noticed withdrawal of some opposing units and notified their superiors accordingly, suggesting that the opportunity be seized with a rapid advance. However, the orders from the Francoist Ejército Centro demanded holding own positions.

During the day reinforcements called by Mera 3 days earlier have been organized; they consisted mostly of the 14. Division, led by Liberino González and previously deployed at the mountainous frontline between the provinces of Guadalajara and Soria, and the 12. Division, also part of the IV. Corps but deployed in reserve. During the day detachments of both units made some 60 km and during the night they arrived at Torrejón de Ardoz, at eastern outskirts of Madrid.

=== March 10, 1939 ===
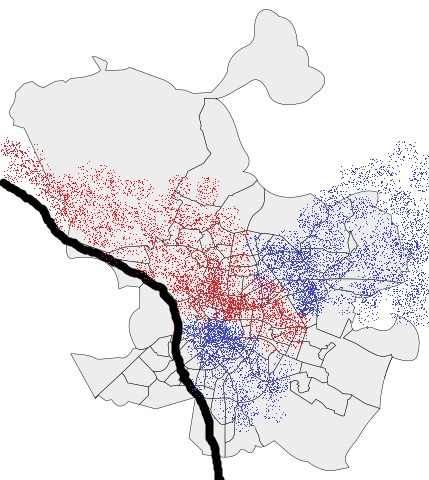
as of late March 10

In the morning, first sub-units of the rebel 14. and 12. Division reached Puente de San Fernando at the Jarama river. Despite earlier PCE decision to avoid bloodshed, they were offered resistance by Communist-controlled units, mostly 44. Brigade and 18. Brigade from the 8. Division. The shootout lasted few hours; eventually motorized columns of the Anarchist-dominated divisions seized control over the bridge and advanced on the western banks of the Jarama. However, at this point the loyalist artillery, deployed at the hill named Alto de Ventas some 5 km west, started pounding the advancing rebel units. They were dispersed and their advance ceased.

There was relatively little fighting in the governmental quarter; the loyalist advance stopped while the rebels were not in position to offer anything more than defense. Engineering detachments from the Communist-controlled units attempted to dig a tunnel and plant explosives behind the rebel lines in immediate vicinity of Ministerio de Hacienda, but failed. Having learnt the news about Mera's troops advancing from the east, in the afternoon elements of the 42. Brigade under Cortinas were sent some 12 km east towards Posición Jaca as reinforcements.

In the late evening, the rebel 12. Division advanced west and approached both Alto de Ventas and bunkers of Posición Jaca. The Communists decided not to offer resistance and abandoned the compound, which was seized by the Anarchist-controlled units. They were now some 10 km away from the half-besieged Casado headquarters at Ministerio de Hacienda and it was the Communist-controlled units which were now getting in an increasingly difficult position, from the south confronted by 65. Division dug in the governmental quarter and from the north-east by the approaching Mera's troops.

=== March 11, 1939 ===
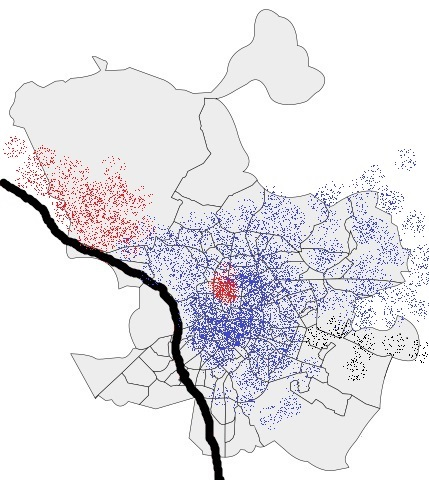
as of late March 11

Since early morning the troops which formed part of the rebel IV. Corps, mostly 12. and 14. Division, commenced offensive along a fairly long, 10-km frontline, ranging from Fuencarral in the north, Chamartín in the centre, Hortaleza, Ciudad Lineál and Ventas in the east towards the governmental quarter in the centre. The Communist leaders abandoned Villa Eloisa, soon seized by the rebels, and went into hiding.

Locally the situation could have differed enormously; there were sections with fierce hand-to-hand combat and there were also quarters where troops fraternized. One example is the suburb of Fuencarral, which changed hands a few times during the day; first seized by the Casadistas, it was later seized by anti-Casadista units of the 8. Division withdrawing from Posición Jaca, and then again fell to the Casadistas. Another example is Ventas, where advancing Anarchist-controlled units sent parliamentarians; equipped with tri-color flags and shouting vivas to the Republic they first tried to convince their counterparts that there was no point fighting.

The 42 Brigade (loyalist) commenced withdrawal from Cibeles to the north-west, across Nuevos Ministerios towards the Manzanares river. In the afternoon fierce fighting took place north of the very centre, as artillery and mortars were employed by both sides. By the evening there were only isolated pockets of Communist resistance in the governmental quarter, as sub-units which previously had tried to penetrate into the Casadista centre failed to withdraw and found themselves encircled by the advancing divisions of Mera. By the dark almost all of Madrid was controlled by the CND; major loyalist strongholds were only Nuevos Ministerios in the centre and the area around El Pardo in the north.

=== March 12, 1939 ===
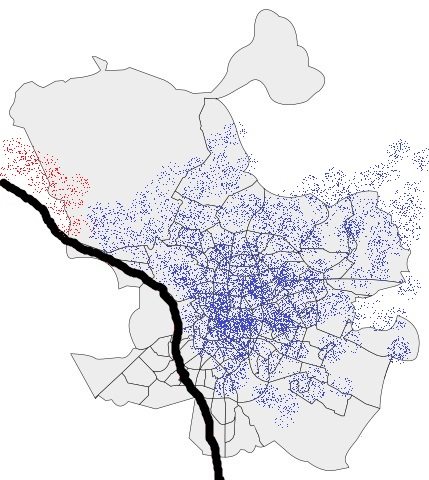
as of late March 12

Last islands of loyalist resistance, especially Nuevos Ministerios and El Pardo, were first isolated and then attacked by the CND troops; some loyalists were overrun, but most surrendered. Servicio de Inteligencia Militar (SIM), the military counter-intelligence service with its Madrid branch controlled by PSOE and headed by the Socialist zealot Ángel Pedrero García, carried out the hunt for Communist militants across the city.

CND published its response to the PCE proposal, made public 3 days earlier. The Consejo rejected all Communist suggestions and demanded nothing but unconditional surrender; it vaguely pledged “to judge the events of the last days without partisan passion”, noted that all Communist POWs not guilty of any crimes would be freed and that the council would be ready to listen to further PCE proposals, though it also reserved the right to make any necessary personal decisions.

The same day Palmiro Togliatti, at the time in hiding in Valencia and acting as the highest PCE authority in Spain, issued a response. He declared that given CND pledged not to embark on reprisals, PCE was prepared to co-operate; some grandiloquent phrases followed, pointing e.g. to “example of sacrifice, heroism and discipline” to be given to the fatherland. It was delivered to the PCE Madrid executive by Togliatti's wife on the evening the same day. The Communist resistance ceased and the battle for Madrid was over. Most resolute commanders, like Ascanio or Fernández, were already detained by the Casadistas; others, like Barceló, Bueno or Ortega, would be apprehended the following day or soon afterwards.

== Coup beyond Madrid ==
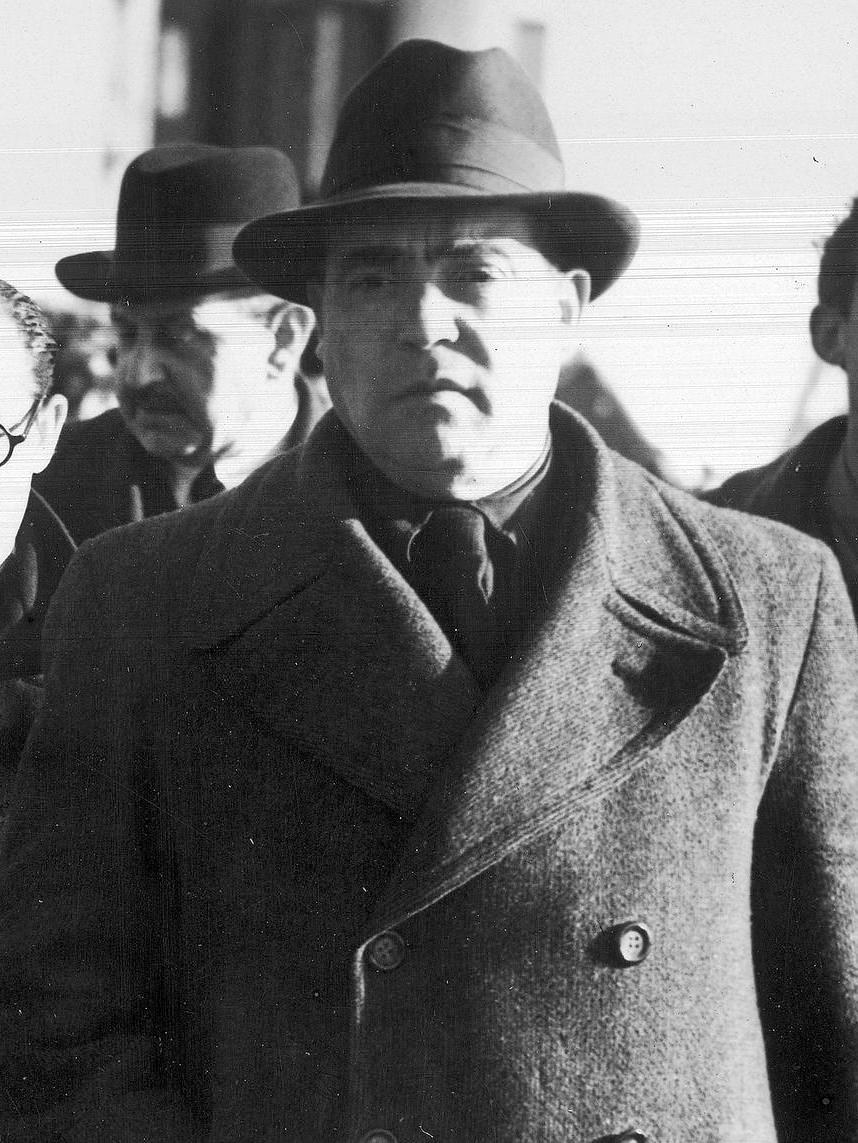
Wenceslao Carrillo

At the moment of Casado's coup, the Republicans controlled some 130.000 sq. kilometers (26% of Spain) and apart from Madrid, also 9 provincial capitals. The key man behind ensuring success of the coup beyond Madrid was Wenceslao Carrillo, who as minister of interior within CND claimed to have been the superior of all provincial administration. He made a series of phone calls to local civil governors which convinced almost all of them (except Alicante) to declare loyalty to the rebels; along the military lines similar action was taken by the freshly Negrín-nominated chief of General Staff, Leopoldo Menéndez, who was part of the plot. In result, apart from minor counter-action on part of Army of Extremadura in Ciudad Real, ephemeral attempts by some units near Valencia and chaotic melee in the Murcian Cartagena, all provinces fell to CND relatively easily.

- Albacete: the civil governor and local military commander opted for loyalty towards CND; as there was risk that they might try to capture the Monóvar airfield near Elda, their takeover prompted Negrín's departure from Spain on March 6
- Alicante: the civil governor, the mayor and the military governor were initially loyal to the government; however, once Negrín and his cabinet as well as part of the PCE executive flew away and left Spain on March 6, they saw no point in resisting and on March 8 the city fell to the Casadistas
- Almería: local UGT, PSOE and CNT declared support for CND. Following some confusion within PCE no resistance was offered, some related premises were ransacked and spontaneous repression began. When local PCE representatives asked the civil governor that the persecution be stopped, they were arrested
- Ciudad Real: commander of Army of Extremadura general Antonio Escobar Huerta, who initially declared loyalty to Negrín, changed his mind eventually adhered to CND. Some PCE groups offered resistance in so-called Palacio Rojo; following some fighting including usage of armored vehicles, the building was seized by the rebels; there were some fatal casualties. Most key Communist officials were arrested. Also, some units of VI. Cuerpo de Ejército (Army of Extremadura), stationed in Siruela, Puertollano or Daimiel tried to counter-react, but eventually there was either minor combat or no combat at all.
- Cuenca: the local military commander José Laín Entralgo, himself member of PCE, contacted Uribe and asked for instructions; he was told not to offer resistance. Despite this, there was some minor fighting recorded before the Casadistas took control
- Guadalajara: the Communist civil governor José Cazorla was lured into a trap by Mera and arrested. No fighting has been recorded
- Jaén: some 70 prominent Communists were promptly arrested and the city immediately fell under the CND control
- Murcia: the civil governor followed the orders from Wenceslao Carillo and arrested most prominent Communists. No fighting was recorded except Cartagena. Extremely chaotic situation emerged in the naval base, with pro-Negrín loyalists, pro-Casado rebels and pro-Franco rebels controlling parts of the port. Cartagena eventually fell under the CND control by March 10.
- Valencia: the newly appointed head of General Staff, general Menéndez, was based in Valencia. He was from the onset member of the Casadista plot, prepared in advance and fairly easily assured the CND control over the city and province; initial plan of Communist-controlled units to mount resistance fizzled out

== Casualties ==
There were some 30,000 soldiers engaged in fightings in or around the capital. The number of casualties and related intensity of combat is unclear. It is usually maintained that there were some 2,000 KIA in Madrid, though according to some sources 2,000 is all casualties, including the wounded. Salas Larrazabál advanced the figure of 233 KIA and 543 WIA, based on documentation produced by Dirección de Servicios de Sanidad del Ejército del Centro; such numbers suggest relatively moderate fighting, though what remains striking is the unusual proportion between the dead and the wounded. Registro Civil de Madrid suggests a similar figure of 243 dead; it is provided as a concluding statement in a recent article, which claims to deal with "myths" related to the 1939 coup. There were some fatal casualties recorded in Cartagena, but given the city was contested also by the Nationalists, it is not clear whether they should be considered as victims of the CND coup.

== Consejo in power ==
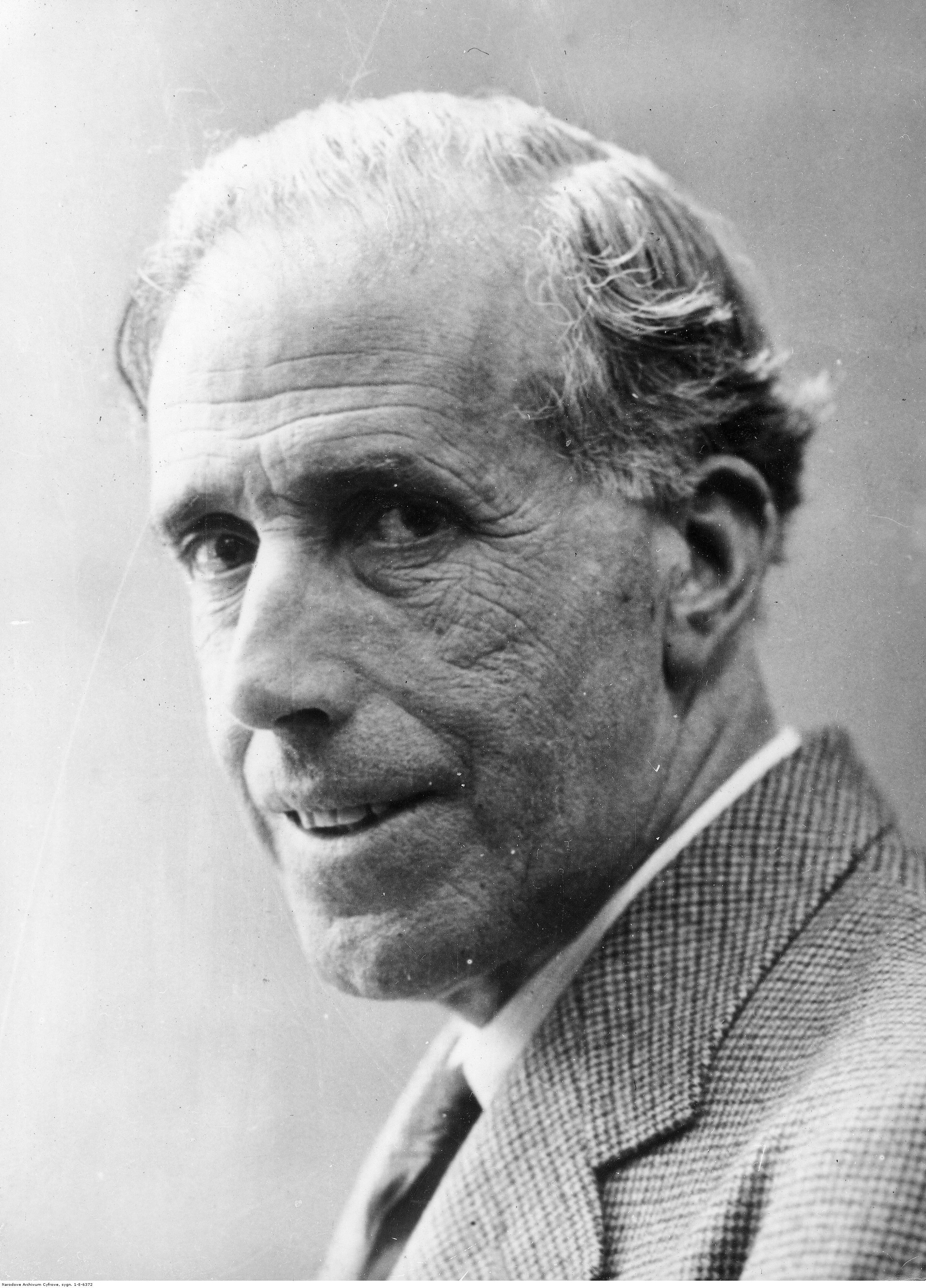
Julián Besteiro

Following successful coup CND embarked on massive political purges, aimed against the Communists. Most of these holding posts in administration (civil governors, alcaldes) or army were released and many were detained; some estimates range up to 15,000 arrested. PCE was not officially outlawed, but at times all members of provincial executive structures were arrested en bloc. The scale of killings is unclear; executions backed by some sort of juridical proceedings were few, and the best known case is this of Barceló. However, some protagonists claimed later that there were hundreds of Communist inmates murdered in prisons or makeshift detention centers, including disposing of them in sewers. These of the detainees who survived the carnage spent 3 weeks behind bars before having been handed over to the Nationalists in late March 1939. Also some symbolic measures have been taken, like removing the red star from military uniforms. The Anarchist and Socialist press commenced a virulent campaign against Negrín and the Communists.

Political differences within CND became apparent almost immediately following the triumph of the coup. The Anarchists imagined that further resistance against the Nationalists would be offered as means of securing best possible terms of surrender; the military intended to arrange ceasefire as soon as possible. To remove the only person who commanded real power, Casado suggested to Mera that he takes command of the Army of Extremadura; the offer was declined. Casado continued his informal negotiations with the Nationalists in pursuit of an honorable peace. On March 23 two of his envoys flew to Burgos and proposed staged surrender combined with evacuation of all these willing to leave Spain; they were treated to demand of immediate and unconditional surrender with vague assurances that people not guilty of criminal activity would not be repressed. CND were uneasy, asked for confirmation and flew the envoys again to Burgos on March 25; hardly any talks took place. Despite this, on March 26 CND ordered no resistance in case of Nationalists advance, which commenced a day later. On March 26–28 all CND members except Besteiro left Madrid for the Levantine coast.

The CND made some efforts to secure money deposits and other papers of the Republican government, stored abroad; the apparent intention was to ensure controlled evacuation. On March 23 Carillo ordered civil governors to prepare evacuation, but no details were provided; in public statements CND officials declared shipping was being readied for everyone willing to leave Spain. However, there was no organized scheme in place and when Nationalist troops commenced advance, tens of thousands started to flee chaotically eastwards. Miaja and Mera flew out from Alicante to Oran on March 29, while Casado set off from Gandia aboard a British warship early on March 30. Alicante fell to the Nationalists on March 30 and the Republican zone ceased to exist.

== Aftermath ==
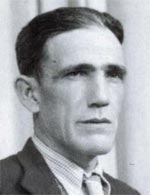
Cipriano Mera

Among the CND members San Andrés was detained in Valencia by the Nationalists. Sentenced to death but commuted, he died when incarcerated in 1940. Besteiro was also detained by the Nationalists, court-martialled to 30 years in prison and he died behind bars in 1940. Pérez was detained by the Nationalists in Alicante and sentenced to 20 years of prison, but released in the early 1940s; he was member of the clandestine PSOE executive until in 1946 he moved to France; he died in Paris in 1955. Miaja lived on exile in France and Mexico, where he died in 1958. Carillo settled in Britain and Belgium, where he died in 1963. Casado lived in the United Kingdom, Venezuela and Colombia; he returned to Spain in 1961 and was subject to juridical investigation, but was not imprisoned; he died in 1968. Del Río Rodríguez lived in Britain and Latin America, but returned to Spain after the death of Franco. He died in 1988. Val left Spain aboard a British ship and settled in France. Detained by the Nazis he spent some time in concentration camps; later he migrated to Argentina. He never returned to Spain and died in 1992. González settled in France. In 1947 he resided in Marseille; his later fate is unknown.

Among other important personalities in the rebel group Pedrero failed to leave Spain; tortured by the Nationalists, he was executed in 1940. Matallana was sentenced to 30 years imprisonment; released in 1941 he lived in poverty until death in 1956. Menéndez lived on exile in Britain, France, Colombia and Mexico, where he died in 1960. Buiza joined the French Foreign Legion in Algeria, joined the Free French in 1942, dodged British blockade transporting Jews to Palestine and settled in Marseille, where he died in 1963. Salgado settled in Britain, where he managed a restaurant and died in 1963. Mera fled Spain to Algeria, but in 1942 he was extradited by the French; sentenced to death, he was freed in 1946 and went to France, where he died in 1975. Gutiérrez was sentenced by the Nationalists; released in the early 1940s, he died in Spain in 1975. García Pradas spent the rest of his life in Britain, where he died as an Anarchist patriarch in 1988. González left Spain with Mera, spent some time in France and lived in Spain in the early 1960s; his later fate is unclear. Nothing is known of Alvárez, who coordinated rebel defense in the centre of Madrid.

Among those who opposed the rebels, Barceló was executed by the Casadistas in March 1939. Ortega was detained by the Nationalists in Alicante and executed in 1939. Ascanio, Girón, José Suárez Montero and many other Communists captured by the Casadistas were handed over to the Nationalists and executed in 1941. Cazorla escaped from Casadista captivity, joined resistance, was captured in late 1939 and executed in 1941. García Vallejo was sentenced to death by the Nationalists; commuted to 30 years imprisonment, he was released in 1946 and died in Spain in 1949. Hernández following exile in Algeria, the USSR, Mexico, Yugoslavia, Romania and again Mexico died there in 1971. Galán was exiled in Algeria and Chile, where he died in 1971. Fernández Cortinas managed to make it to the USSR, where he died in 1978. Pertegas lived in the USSR until 1984, when he returned to Spain and died in 2002. Bueno was sentenced by the Nationalists, but released in the early 1940s; it is not clear what happened to him later. Nothing is known about the fate of Fernández.

== Coup in public discourse ==
In later Francoist propaganda and historiography the Casadistas did not differ much from Negrín and his government; they were given no credit, and the coup was presented as meaningless squabbles within the criminal red regime. If some rebels were later permitted to live in Spain it was measure of some remnants of corporate military solidarity rather than appreciation or gratitude. The Anarchist and Socialist exiles played down their own role in the coup and presented it as an unavoidable response to the Communist dictatorship. Casado and his supporters presented their action as pre-emptive strike against Communist coup which spared the country unnecessary sufferings of prolonged war, waged in the interest of the USSR. The Communists themselves lambasted the coup as treason and underlined its importance as a stab in the back; it reportedly proved a deadly blow to the Republic which otherwise might have resisted for much longer. However, their narrative was also hostile to Negrín, as after 1939 the ways of the former prime minister and the PCE parted. In academic historiography until the 1990s the coup was viewed “in a positive light” as a "humanitarian intervention”.

In present-day historiography views as to mechanism which triggered the coup differ. One is that following the fall of Catalonia the Republic moved from the phase of permanent crisis to the phase of disintegration; within this perspective the coup was not a cause but rather a result of ongoing collapse. Somewhat different take is that the hybrid regime of the Republican zone, in which 3 major political groupings tried to impose their own dictatorship and kept each other in check, was doomed from the onset; when degenerated into domination of one party, it produced counter-action. Others believe that the Republic might have potentially achieved internal stability, but Negrín alienated all allies and ended up as a PCE hostage, which eventually produced a counter-strike. Some shift attention to the military, who reportedly nurtured notions of caste solidarity and imagined that a new version of Abrazo de Vergara was possible between army professionals. There are also scholars who offer a personalist focus; they underline selfishness of Casado, naivety of Besteiro or incompetence of Miaja against far-sightedness of Negrín. Finally, some deny Casado any autonomy and present him rather as a pawn in hands of the Fifth Column.

There is also a range of opinions as to the impact of the coup. Most scholars agree that CND failed to achieve 1 of its 3 key objectives, i.e. a “peace without bloodshed”; on the other hand, it secured the other 2: ended Communist domination (yet replaced it not with democracy but own dictatorship), and prevented further deaths resulting from Nationalist-Republican war. The prevailing opinion is that the coup precipitated but not caused the defeat of the Republic. Some authors claim that its most tangible result was humanitarian disaster caused by undermining a massive evacuation scheme, prepared by Negrín. Others maintain that no such scheme has ever existed; some present Casado as the man committed to republican values who actually prevented massive bloodshed. Almost no-one maintains any more that there was indeed a Communist coup planned but prevented by the Casadistas, yet there are opinions that until early March Stalin was still committed to helping the Republic and it was the coup which triggered his ultimate decision to withdraw. There are voices that Negrín and the Communists did not offer resistance as they were looking for scapegoats, and the coup provided them with an excellent opportunity. The chief protagonist of the coup, Casado, generates vastly different opinions. His most vehement apologist, Pedro López, presents him as a modest man who sacrificed himself for the cause of democracy, peace and humanitarism against dictatorship, terror and carnage. His most vehement critic, Paul Preston, sees a cynical, arrogant and incompetent individual in pursuit of own glory and enslaved to own sectarian obsessions.

== See also ==
- May Days - conflict in Catalonia between Republican factions in 1937
