= Wenceslao Carrillo =

Spanish politician (1889–1963)

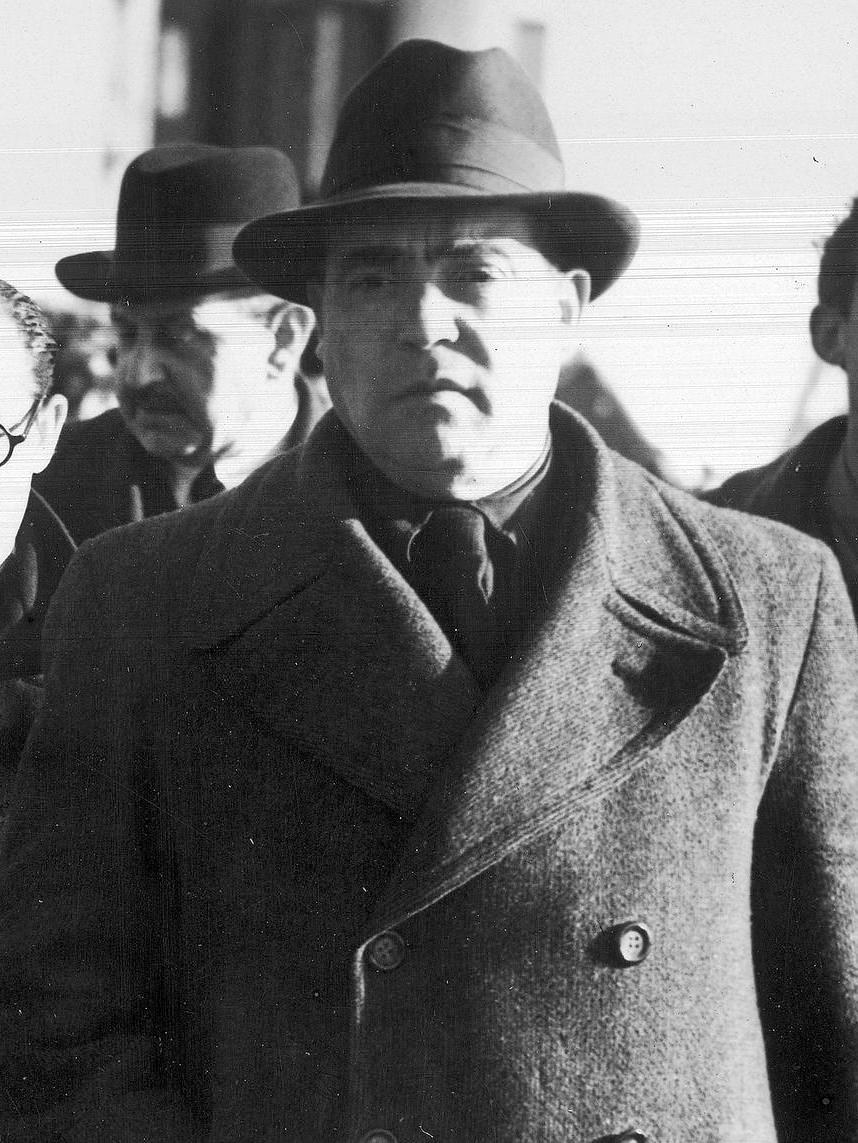
- Wenceslao Carrillo in 1939, upon his arrival to the United Kingdom, fleeing from Franco's victory.
- Born: 1889; Valladolid, Spain
- Died: 1963; Charleroi, Wallonia, Belgium

Wenceslao Carrillo Alonso-Forjador (9 October 1889 in Valladolid, Spain – 7 November 1963 in Charleroi, Belgium) was a prominent Spanish Socialist leader and the father of Santiago Carrillo. He belonged to the "Caballerist" faction of the Spanish Socialist Workers' Party and participated in the Casado's coup of March 1939.
