= RFA Maine (1902) =

Hospital ship of the Royal Fleet Auxiliary

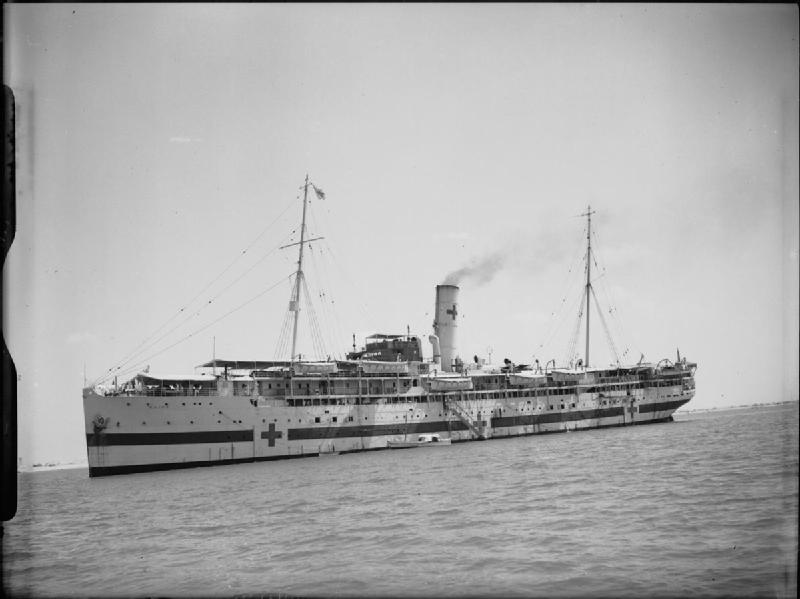

History

United Kingdom
- Name: SS Panama
- Owner: Pacific Steam Navigation Company Ltd.
- Port of registry: Liverpool
- Route: Liverpool to Spain, Portugal and South America.
- Builder: Fairfield Shipbuilding and Engineering Company Ltd., Govan
- Yard number: 419
- Launched: 8 March 1902
- Maiden voyage: May 1902
- Identification: United Kingdom official number: 115276; Signal: TJKP
- Fate: Chartered by the British Admiralty, 25 July 1915

United Kingdom
- Name: HMHS Panama
- Acquired: 29 July 1915
- Decommissioned: 15 October 1920
- Notes: Reclassified on 20 May 1917 as an "Ambulance Transport" to permit defensive armament; use of Red Cross symbols discontinued.

History

United Kingdom
- Name: RFA Maine
- Acquired: by purchase, October 1920
- Commissioned: 31 March 1922
- Decommissioned: 21 February 1947
- Identification: Pennant number X24
- Fate: Broken up, July 1948, at Bo'ness

General characteristics
- Type: Ocean liner converted to hospital ship
- Tonnage: 5,981 GRT, 3,507 NRT (commercial); 5,768 GRT, 3,306 NRT
- Displacement: 10,100 (hospital ship)
- Length: 401 ft 6 in (122.38 m)
- Beam: 58 ft 6 in (17.83 m)
- Draught: 23 ft 6 in (7.16 m)
- Propulsion: 2 x coal-fired triple-expansion recipriocating engines
- Speed: 13 knots

Royal Fleet Auxiliary ship Maine (formerly SS Panama) was a hospital ship of the British Royal Fleet Auxiliary, that served during the First World War and the Second World War.

== Civilian service ==
The ship was originally launched as SS Panama on Clydeside on 8 March 1902, as an ocean liner for the Pacific Steam Navigation Company of Liverpool. Her maiden voyage carried 130 first-class passengers from Liverpool to Montevideo and Valparaíso. Thereafter, she was generally engaged in a triangular route between Liverpool, Lisbon, Portugal, Vigo, Spain and various ports in South America. The 5,981 GRT, 3,507 NRT ship was registered in Liverpool assigned the United Kingdom official number 115276, signal letters TJKP.

== First World War ==
After the start of the First World War, on 25 July 1915, Panama was chartered by the British Admiralty for use as a hospital ship, without a change of name. Following conversion, she was dispatched to the Mediterranean to evacuate casualties from the Gallipoli campaign, but from the summer of 1916, she was mainly engaged in ferrying the sick and wounded from Le Havre to Netley Hospital at Southampton. In December 1916, Panama was sent to Greece to assist with the Macedonian front, but had returned to home waters by the following February. Following the Armistice of 11 November 1918, she participated in the exchange of wounded prisoners of war via Rotterdam, and in October 1919, sailed for Alexandria for similar exchanges with Turkish POWs at various ports in the eastern Mediterranean, finally returning to Southampton in October 1920, where she was decommissioned.

== Inter-war period ==
Panama was purchased outright by the Admiralty shortly afterwards for use as a hospital ship with the Mediterranean Fleet. Renamed Maine, she was the third, and longest serving hospital ship to bear the name, the first which was donated by the "American Ladies Hospital Ship Society" for use in the Second Boer War had been wrecked in July 1914 and replaced by the second.

She entered service after conversion in May 1922 and was sent to Malta and in September, evacuated Greek refugees from the Burning of Smyrna. In January 1927, she left Malta for Singapore for deployment to the China Station, returning to Portsmouth in December before rejoining the Mediterranean Fleet. On 20 February 1928 Maine broke her moorings during a storm at Malta and was grounded. In 1935 she attended King George V's Silver Jubilee Fleet Review off Spithead, where she was used to entertain important guests, her Red Cross markings having been removed for the occasion. Between July 1936 and July 1938, she participated in the evacuation of refugees from the Spanish Civil War, carrying a total of 6,574 refugees of 41 nationalities to safety.

== Second World War ==
During the war, Maine acted as Base Hospital Ship at Alexandria in Egypt and treated a total of 13,514 patients, despite being damaged during air raids on the port. She also participated in the evacuation of Crete, the Siege of Tobruk and the Allied invasion of Sicily. She was the oldest hospital ship from any nation during the conflict. Following the end of the war, she assisted casualties from the Greek Civil War and the Corfu Channel incident. Maine was decommissioned on 21 February 1947, and was broken up by P & W McClellan & Sons in Bo'ness, Scotland, in July 1948.
