= Segismundo Casado =

Spanish Army officer

Segismundo Casado López
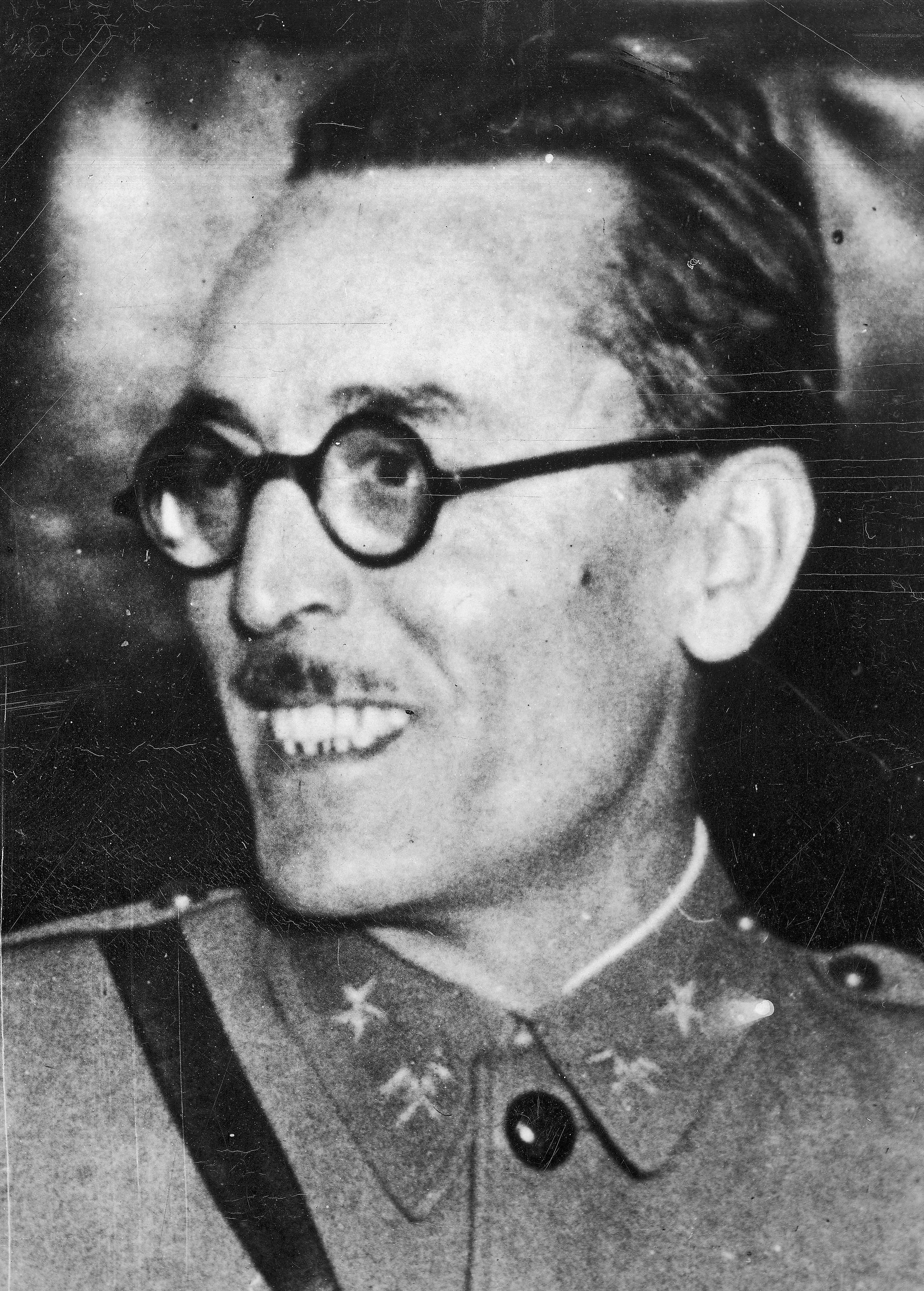
- Segismundo Casado
- Born: Segismundo Casado López; 10 October 1893; Nava de la Asunción, Segovia, Spain
- Died: 18 December 1968 (aged 75); Madrid, Spain
- Military career
- Allegiance: (Second Spanish Republic) Spanish Republic
- Branch: Spanish Republican Army
- Rank: Colonel
- Commands: Commander of an Army Corps (1938), Commander of the Army of the Centre (1939)
- Conflicts: Rif War; Spanish Civil War: Siege of Madrid; Battle of Jarama; Battle of Brunete; Final offensive

Segismundo Casado López (10 October 1893 – 18 December 1968) was an officer of the Spanish Army. He served during the late Restoration, the Primo de Rivera dictatorship and the Second Spanish Republic. Following outbreak of the Spanish Civil War he sided with the Republicans, gradually rising to commander of the Army of the Centre. He is best known as leader of the coup against the government of Juan Negrín; its objectives were preventing a Communist takeover and terminating fratricidal bloodshed during the war, considered already lost. The rebels seized control of the Republican zone; in their quasi-government Casado served as the minister of defense. Negotiations with the Nationalists failed; Casado went on exile, first to Britain and from 1947 to Latin America, returning to Spain in 1961.

== Military career ==
There is little clarity as to Casado's parents. Himself he claimed - and this information is reproduced by the Spanish Real Academia de la Historia - that his parents, Tomás Casado Arribas and Tomasa López Quinsano, were farmers, and that his father worked as bracero. According to his own account during childhood and youth he suffered misery and it was thanks to extraordinary efforts of his parents that he managed to complete education in a local primary school. However, numerous other sources claim that his father was a military officer and served as an infantry captain.

=== Junior officer ===
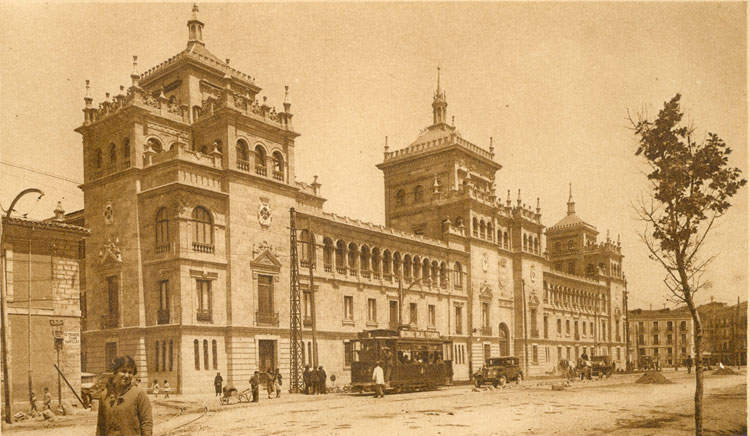
cavalry Academy, Valladolid

As an adolescent in 1907 Casado entered the Cavalry Academy in Valladolid. Having completed the curriculum as 15th among 44 graduates, in 1911 he was promoted to segundo teniente. Initially he was posted to Regimento Cazadores de Almansa, but was soon transferred to 4. Regimento de Caballería in Burgos; within this unit he was posted to 1. Deposito de Caballos Sementales in Jérez de la Frontera. In 1912 he was again transferred to Regimento de Lanceros del Príncipe. In 1913 he was promoted to teniente primero. In 1912-1916 he followed various courses, e.g. at Curso de Escuela de Equitación Militar, Escuela Central de Tiro and Secciones de Obreros y Explosivos en lor Regimientos del Arma. In 1917 he was deployed with his regiment on public order duties during a general strike. In 1918 Casado entered Escuela Superior de Guerra; in 1919 he was promoted to captain.

In 1921 Casado was transferred to Larache in Spanish Morocco and assigned to a machine-gun company, deployed mostly as protection of various logistics operations. He was appreciated by superiors, who in reports noted Casado's distinguished role in combat and in the rear. However, following less than half a year in Morocco in 1922 he was withdrawn from the line, and assigned to the Regimento Mixto de Artillería and then to the Comandancia General de Ceuta. In 1923 Casado received the General Staff diploma.

In 1924 Casado was recorded within the Alcalá de Henares garrison. He assumed command of a squadron in the Regimento de Lanceros de la Reina in Madrid the following year. In 1928 he entered another military course intended for candidates to higher officer ranks, and in 1929 he was promoted to comandante. A year later he was posted to the Escuela de Estudios Superiores (later Escuela Superior de Guerra), but this time as auxiliary professor at Curso de Táctica y Servicio de Estado Mayor. According to his own account, from the onset Casado opposed the Primo de Rivera dictatorship; documents confirm that in 1927 he defended in military court some individuals involved in the so-called Sanjuanada, and in 1929 he represented in court the officers deemed engaged in rebellious activities in Ciudad Real.

=== Senior officer ===
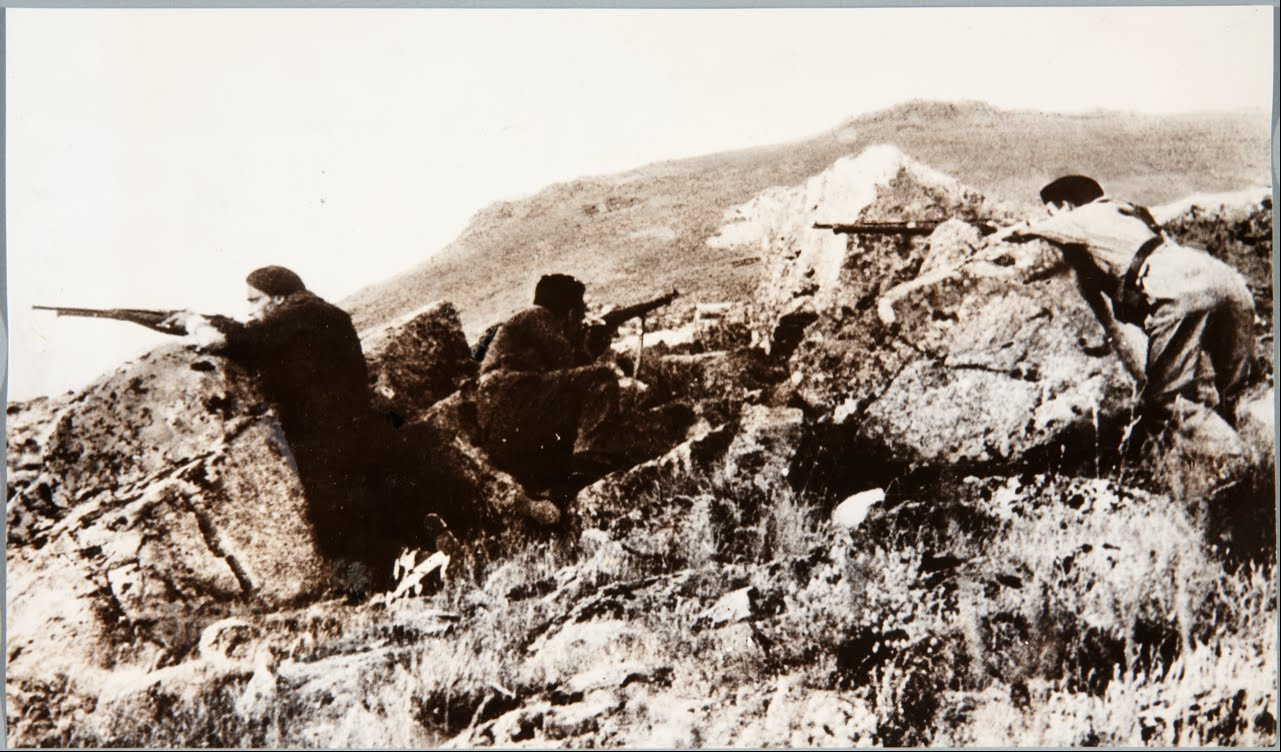
Guadarrama fightings, 1936

The advent of the Republic produced military reform and revision of some promotions; in 1931 Casado's ascension to commandant was reversed. Casado continued to work in Escuela Superior; in 1931 he published a study, Organización del Ejército Francés, and in 1933 Empleo de la División de Caballería en el Servicio de Exploración estratégica followed. According to some sources, at the time Casado became one of key advocates of armored units, up to total replacement of cavalry with arma blindada. In late 1934 he was (again) nominated to comandante. In early 1935 Casado was nominated commander of personal detachment of the president (escolta del presidente), Niceto Alcalá-Zamora; from May 1936 he performed the same role serving the new president, Manuel Azaña.

According to some sources, during the coup of July 1936, Casado personally decided that Azaña be relocated from his residence in El Pardo to the centre of Madrid; the move which might have prevented Azaña's captivity, as the presidential communications unit rebelled. He then served in Sierra de Guadarrama, according to some in general staff of "columna Bernal", and according to others as "jefe de la columna Galán". In October 1936 he was recalled to Madrid and assumed the role of head of the operations department at the General Staff, reportedly because he was considered an "excellent planner"; he was also promoted to teniente coronel. Other sources claim he was dismissed as head of operations shortly after.

In late 1936 Casado remained engaged in organisation, planning and teaching. Following the decision to build mixed brigades he was active raising those units, though instead of the original concept of autonomous operations, he preferred them to be part of divisions. He kept lecturing at Escuela Popular de Estado Mayor, soon relocated to Valencia; at one point he became the head of the institution. In May 1937 Casado was nominated general inspector of the cavalry. During the summer of 1937 he assumed command of XVIII Army Corps, which at the time mounted an offensive in Aragon; following an initial advance, the corps failed to reach its objectives. In September 1937 Casado was nominated commander of the newly formed XXI Army Corps, also deployed in Aragon. In March 1938 he assumed command of the Army of Andalusia, but in May he returned to Madrid to head the Army of the Centre. Also in May he was promoted to coronel. In February 1939 Casado was promoted to the rank of general.

=== Casado's coup ===
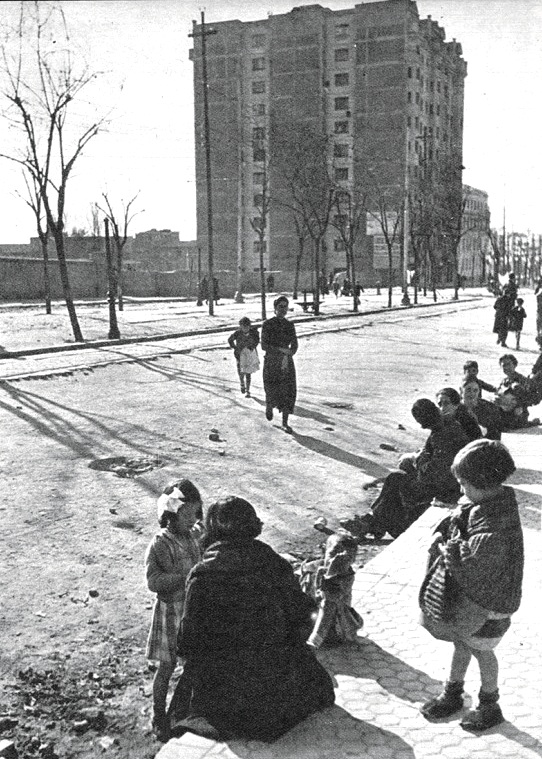
Madrid, few days before the March coup

Throughout 1938 Casado developed doubts about the prime minister Negrín's strategy to keep on fighting. He was increasingly convinced that the war was already lost, and that further resistance would only produce unnecessary deaths, suffering and destruction. He blamed the Communists for prolonging the war in the interest of the Soviet Union. In late 1938 Casado engaged in talks with some politicians about forming an anti-Negrín opposition, and in early 1939 he entered into secret peace talks with the Nationalists. In February the conspiracy was already well developed; Casado was its undisputed leader, supported by most of the military command layer, the Anarchists and the Socialists.

On March 5, 1939, the plotters declared the constitution of the Consejo Nacional de Defensa (CND), which claimed all power in the Republican zone; it was presented as a pre-emptive strike against an imminent dictatorial Communist takeover. Casado was the key man behind CND; during a phone talk with Negrín he refused to budge. He temporarily acted as the CND president, but ceded the post to general Miaja the following day and within the body he assumed office as counselor of defence. It is not clear to what extent Casado was commanding CND-loyal troops during fighting against the Communist-loyal units, fighting that went on in Madrid until March 11. Once CND assumed full control over the Republic, Casado took part in some juridical proceedings, resulting in death sentences and execution of some Communist leaders, including Luis Barceló.

Casado and the CND continued talks with the Nationalists. He intended to negotiate a staged surrender, evacuation of all those willing to leave Spain, with the added proviso of no political repression afterwards; he might have even hoped for re-integration of professional Republican officers into the post-war army. The Nationalists demanded immediate and unconditional surrender; and with no such document signed, Casado eventually realised that further negotiations were pointless. On March 26 CND ordered the end of resistance to the Nationalist advance, which commenced the next day. On March 28 Casado flew out of Madrid to Valencia. According to some sources he tried to arrange ships for mass evacuation and in his last radio broadcast he claimed they would be available in Alicante; according to others he did close to nothing in terms of enabling evacuation. On March 29, in Gandia, Casado boarded a British warship, which set sail in the early hours of March 30.

== Exile and life as a retiree ==
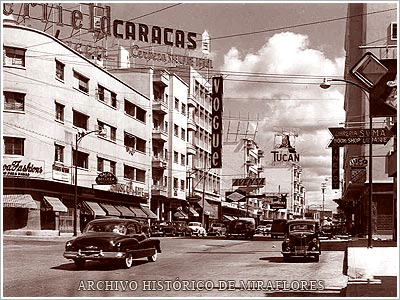
Caracas, 1950s

Casado was transported to Marseille on a British hospital ship. He then travelled to the United Kingdom, most likely with approval of the London government. He received a stipend from the British Committee for Refugees from Spain; following intervention of the Foreign Office, his allowances were set at a higher rate than normally. In late 1939 he was given a job in the Spanish section of the BBC; he commented on military issues using the pseudonym of "Coronel Juan de Padilla". According to some scholars, BBC World Service served as a sort of a repository for individuals that British Intelligence thought potentially useful in the future. He wrote The Last Days of Madrid, the book translated and published in record time; one author suspects MI6 was involved. It is not clear when his job at the BBC was terminated and what he was doing for a living in the mid-1940s.

At some time Casado got professionally involved with the Swiss multi-national food conglomerate Nestlé. In 1947 he left Britain for Colombia as an employee of its Colombian subsidiary, Cicolac. He might have hoped for some role in politics, as he speculated that following the end of World War Two and in the atmosphere of international anti-Franco ostracism, the British were likely to enforce the fall of the Franco regime, an outcome that might see a role for him back in Spain. In 1949 he moved to Indulac, the Nestlé subsidiary for Venezuela. He spent 12 years there, touring the country as a commercial representative. As he turned 60 he developed various health problems, finding from the mid-1950s his work was getting increasingly challenging.

In 1961 Casado returned to Spain; it is not clear whether before doing so he had any contacts with the Francoist administration. He settled in Madrid at calle Cea Bermúdez and initially was not subject to any juridical or administrative harassment, this despite the fact that in 1943 he had been tried by Tribunal Especial para la Represión de la Masonería y el Comunismo and in 1944 had been sentenced to 12 years in prison for rebellion.

In Spain, finding his Nestlé pension was hardly sufficient, in 1962 he applied for a military pension. This triggered an investigation by the authorities, including focus on his role in the Republican armed forces. Eventually charges of military rebellion were dropped, though he was briefly placed under house arrest. In 1966 he suffered a minor heart attack. To address ongoing financial problems, in 1967 he re-published The Last Days, in Spanish titled Así cayó Madrid; first serialised in a Falange periodical El Pueblo, it was then issued as a book. It was re-edited to be even more damning to Negrín.

== Private life ==
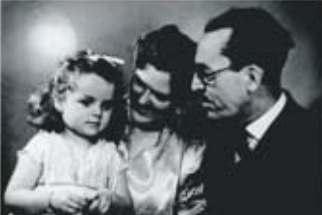
Casado with Norah Purcell and his daughter

In 1920 Casado married María de las Mercedes de la Calle Condado; none of the sources consulted provides any information either on her or on her family, except that she survived the civil war. The marriage did not last and produced no offspring. It is not clear whether the couple divorced or the marriage was annulled. At unspecified time, either in the early or in the mid-1930s, Casado married María del Carmen Santodomingo de Vega (1911-1976). They had 2 children: Carmen and Segismundo Casado Santodomingo, born in the mid-1930s. In unclear circumstances the family got separated upon Casado leaving Spain in 1939; his wife and children remained in the country and initially sought refuge in the diplomatic legation of Panama. As the premises were stormed by the Francoists she was imprisoned and initially held in a cell with prostitutes. Later the family were denied passports. Casado's efforts to secure their exit, aided informally by British diplomacy in the early 1940s, proved fruitless.

In the early 1940s Casado entered into an intimate relationship with an Englishwoman, Norah Purcell, just divorced from a colonial administrator and sinologist Victor Purcell; she later gained some recognition as a translator from French. They lived together for six years and had a daughter, María Cristina (surname unclear), who died in 1946. For reasons which remain unknown, the union ended with Casado's departure for Latin America, though apparently Casado was still in love and tried to maintain amorous correspondence at least until the early 1950s. In 1951 he was re-joined by his wife and both children in Venezuela. However, he soon concluded that they were "totally incompatible" and suggested she go back to Spain; details and background of their differences are not known. Nevertheless, the family lived together. Carmen accompanied Casado when he returned to Spain; the children remained in Venezuela.

Casado had at least one brother, César; it is not clear who of the siblings was older. Like Segismundo, he also became a professional cavalry officer and both brothers progressed almost simultaneously through the military promotion ladder, e.g. in 1913 both were segundos tenientes, in 1923-1924 both were capitanes, and in 1936 both were comandantes. He was recorded as related to the Madrid branch of the Anarchist trade union CNT. During the civil war he sided with the Republicans and in July 1938 as mayor de caballería was assigned "a las ordénes de la Subsecretaria de Tierra" in the Ministry of Defense. The position he took during the coup of March 1939 is not clear. It is known, however, that the brothers had a falling out and after the war Segismundo explicitly forbade his children to accept any financial help from César.

== Outlook and political views ==
Casado's political views are not entirely clear, though he was without doubt a man of the Left. In his publications and in his private correspondence he referred to his childhood, spent in the misery and poverty of the rural working class, which reportedly made him sensitive to social injustice. This might not seem compatible with his entry into professional military service, as at the time the army along the monarchy and the Church were considered pillars of the regime, though on the other hand he was only 15 when applying to the military academy. There is no trace of his political engagements until he was in his early 30s. He did not welcome the Primo de Rivera dictatorship; in his own papers Casado refers to himself as a rebel, though there is no evidence of any rebellious activity recorded. However, at least twice he appeared in military courts defending fellow officers charged with conspiracy against the regime.

Despite reversion of his promotion to comandante Casado did not seem to harbor any grievances against the Republic. Though he did not engage in open politics, he must have been considered a loyal republican officer as, in 1935, he was nominated to the position of commander of the personal guard of the president, even though at the time the Right was in power. There is no doubt as to his loyalty to the Republic following the coup d'état of July 1936, which was far more than simple "geographical loyalty" (lealtad geográfica) of many professional officers trapped in the Republican zone. Some scholars claim that in late 1936 he developed a particular antipathy towards the Communists, as he blamed them for his sidetracking from General Staff operations towards other organisational work; he is presented by historian Paul Preston as a man "eaten up with resentment", though on personal rather than political grounds. His brother seemed related to the anarchist CNT, but there is no evidence that Segismundo was close to anarchism; neither is there any data which points to his relation to socialism. Some authors claim that "he broadly shared Azaña's view of politics", which points to radical left-wing republicanism.

In his own papers and in some historiographic literature, Casado is pictured as a man of decisively progressive outlook, determined to fight for democracy, liberty and social justice against any sort of dictatorship – be it a Communist or a Francoist one. It is not clear whether Casado was a Catholic; it is known that some time in the 1920s he joined the freemasonry, which was not necessarily incompatible with some sort of unorthodox, liberal Catholicism.

Either from childhood or from some point in his adult life he embraced anti-Semitism. In his papers from the 1950s he refers abusively to Franco as the "Jewish dwarf"; at the same time, when engaged in fruitless discussions on changing his travelling work pattern in Venezuela, he blamed his managers from Indulac for "Jewish mentality". However, he remained reasonably tractable and for decades he was engaged in at least correct epistolary exchange with correspondents as distant as Indalecio Prieto, Salvador de Madariaga, Cipriano Mera and the Alfonsist pretender Juan de Borbón.

== In public discourse ==
In popular discourse of Francoist Spain, Casado was rather absent; if mentioned, he was noted as the one who mounted a pre-emptive anti-Communist strike. This was the thesis repeated also in academic historiography. In his monumental work on the Spanish Civil War, written in the 1960s, Hugh Thomas presented Casado as a man much less far-sighted than Negrín and perhaps guilty of some political naïveté; however, from the narrative he still emerged as a well-intentioned person, even if somewhat guided by personal grievances against the PCE. Casado's Así cayó Madrid was rather well received by critics; reviewers presented the book as defense against absurd Communist charges of surrendering the Republic "when the people wanted to continue the struggle". Following his death Spanish newspapers adhered to a very matter-of-fact tone, at times again presenting him as a man who prevented a Communist coup. In the early 1970s historian Ricardo de la Cierva referred to him as a "distinguished military theorist and technician".

Since the 1980s most scholars have concluded that there was no Communist coup d'état planned, which dismantled part of the rationale behind the 1939 coup. Instead of describing Casado's coup as directed against "Communist-dominated government", some authors began to write of a coup "against the legal government". Authors increasingly focused on Casado's personal motivations, with an emphasis on his excessive ambition. The advent of social and digital media produced an array of opinions, from those lambasting Casado as traitor to these counting him among the heroes and great patriots, as well as other voices in between. Some historians view the coup not as an act to stop further killing, but as an avoidable error which facilitated the triumph of a Francoist dictatorship.

Paul Preston was heavily critical of Casado; his 2016 work presented Casado as a man obsessed with his own ambition who precipitated a massive humanitarian disaster. In 2018 author Pedro López Ortega published a book that advanced the opposite view: Casado "represented realism and humanitarian sensitivity against folly and fanaticism of the others".

Until recently, a minor street in Casado's native town of Nava de la Asunción was named after him. In 1976 José María Rodríguez Méndez wrote Ultima batalla en El Pardo, a theatrical drama centred on the 1939 coup; its protagonists were Franco and Casado. The work deals with the question of an individual facing great events and does not appear to take sides; it was not published until the 1990s and was first staged in the 21st century. Casado features as a protagonist in a few Spanish novels set in the Madrid of early 1939. In Spanish public discourse it is at times claimed that the iconic actor Fernando Rey (born Fernando Casado) was the son of Segismundo Casado; in fact, he the son of another Republican military official.
