= Battle of Guadalajara =

1937 battle of the Spanish Civil War

Coordinates: 40.6333°N 3.1667°W

- Part of the Spanish Civil War
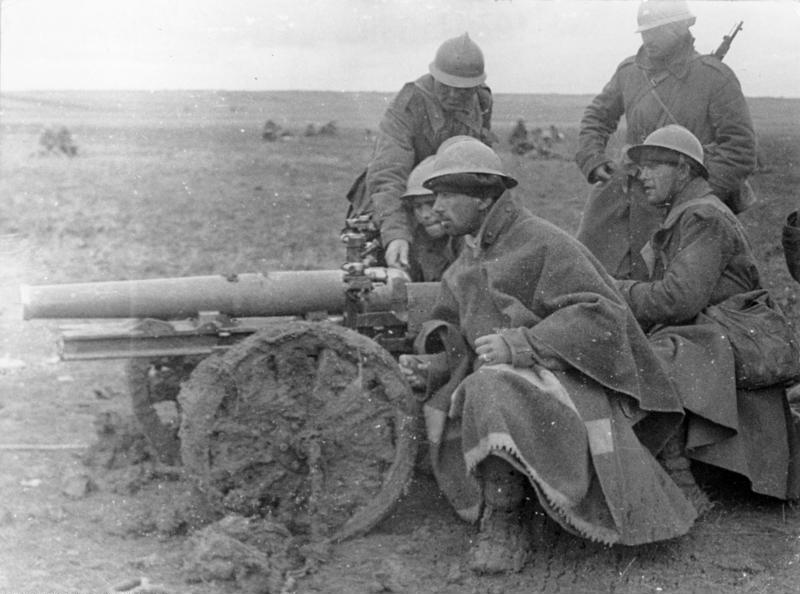
- Nationalist forces at Guadalajara
Date	8–23 March 1937
Location	Guadalajara, Guadalajara, Spain
Result	Republican victory

Belligerents
Republican Spain; International Brigades	Nationalist Spain; Italian Volunteer Corps

Commanders and leaders
Vicente Rojo Lluch; José Miaja; Enrique Jurado Barrio; Enrique Líster; Nino Nanetti; Cipriano Mera	Mario Roatta; Annibale Bergonzoli; Edmondo Rossi; Guido Coppi; Luigi Nuvoloni; José Moscardó Ituarte

Strength
20,000; 45 artillery pieces 60 armoured vehicles 70 aircraft	35,000; 15,000; 270 artillery pieces 140 armoured vehicles 62 aircraft

Casualties and losses
Republicans: 2,000 dead 4,000 wounded 258 captured Total: 6,258	Italians: 600 or 3,000 dead 2,000–4,000 wounded 800 missing 300-800 captured Nationalists: 4,000 dead 4,000 wounded 800 captured Materiel lost: 65 artillery pieces; 500 machine guns; 13 mortars; 67 trucks; 10 tanks captured; Plenty ammunition; Total: 17,400

Map of the battle

The Battle of Guadalajara (8–23 March 1937) saw the victory of the Spanish Republican Army (Ejército Popular Republicano, or EPR) and of the International Brigades over the Italian and Nationalist forces attempting to encircle Madrid during the Spanish Civil War. The Nationalist forces involved in the Battle of Guadalajara were primarily the Italian Corps of Volunteer Troops (Corpo Truppe Volontarie, or CTV).

The battle opened with an Italian offensive on 8 March. This offensive was halted by 11 March. Between 12 and 14 March, renewed Italian attacks were supported by Spanish Nationalist units. These were halted too. On 15 March, a counter-offensive of the Republicans was prepared; it was successfully launched between 18 and 23 March. The battle was decided by the superiority of Soviet armoured vehicles over Italian ones.

The combined Italian and Nationalist losses are estimated to have been 17,400 killed, wounded and captured, compared to 6,258 for the Republicans. As a result of a re-organisation and new leadership, the CTV improved its combat record after Guadalajara, which was the force's only defeat of the war.

== Background ==
After the collapse of the third offensive on Madrid, Spanish Nationalist General Francisco Franco decided to continue with a fourth offensive aimed at closing the pincer around the capital. The Nationalist forces, after a defeat at the Battle of Jarama, were exhausted and could not create the necessary momentum to carry the operation through. However, the Italians were optimistic after the capture of Málaga, and it was thought that the Italian forces could score an easy victory owing to the heavy losses sustained by the People's Republican Army at Jarama. Italian dictator Benito Mussolini endorsed the operation and committed Italian units to it.

The Italian commander, General Mario Roatta, planned to surround the defences of Madrid from the north-east. After joining the Spanish Nationalist corps "Madrid" on the Jarama River, they would begin the assault on Madrid. The Italian forces would execute the main attack. The Spanish division "Soria" was present to secure the operation, but played no part in the first five days of fighting. The main attack began in the 25 km-wide pass at Guadalajara-Alcalá de Henares. This region was well suited for an advance, as there were five roads of high quality running through it. Three other roads in the area led to Guadalajara, allowing for the possibility of capturing this town as well. The Nationalist forces had 35,000 soldiers, 222 artillery pieces, 108 L3/33 tankettes and L3/35 tankettes, 32 armoured cars, 3,685 motor vehicles, and 60 Fiat CR.32 fighter planes. The Italian tankettes and armoured cars were organized as the "Tank and Armoured Cars Group" (Agrupación de carros de asalto y autos blindados). The Italian aircraft were organized into the "Legionary Air Force" (Aviazione Legionaria).

The Republican presence in the Guadalajara region consisted only of the 12th Division of the People's Republican Army under Colonel Lacalle. He had under his command 10,000 soldiers with 5,900 rifles, 85 machine guns, and 15 artillery pieces. One company of T-26 light tanks were also sent to the area. No defensive works had been constructed in the Guadalajara region, because it was regarded as a peaceful part of the front. The People's Republican Army staff was sure that the next Fascist offensive would come from the south.

== Italian offensive ==
=== 8 March ===
After 30 minutes' artillery fire and air raids on the Republican positions, the Italians began advancing towards the 50th Republican brigade. Led by tankettes, they broke through the Republican line. Their assault then slowed, mainly because fog and sleet had reduced visibility down to 100 metres (110 yards) in places. The Italians captured 10 to 12 km of terrain, including the towns of Mirabueno, Alaminos and Castejon. Falling back, the Republican commander requested infantry reinforcements and the company of tanks.

=== 9 March ===
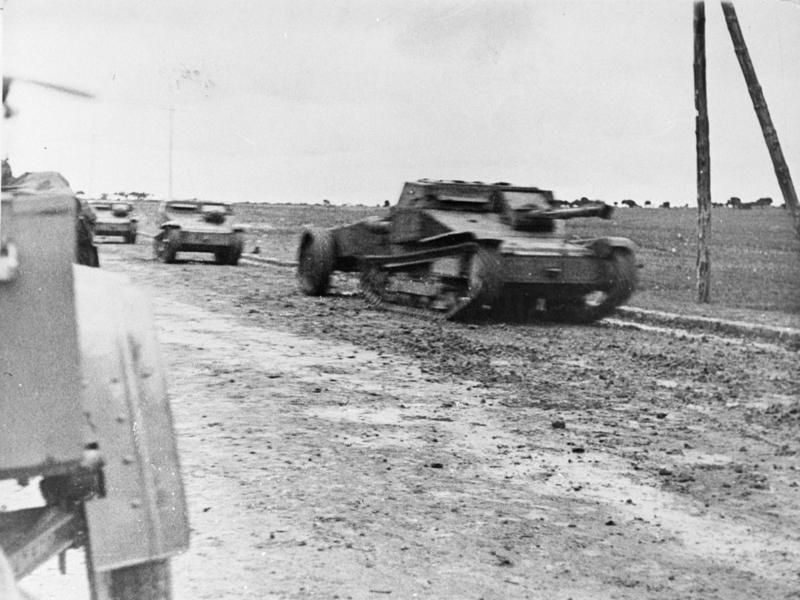
Italian tankettes advancing with a flame thrower tank in the lead at Guadalajara.

The Nationalists continued their assault on Republican positions. The main attack was carried out with tanks but again bogged down from poor performance and low visibility. The Republican 50th Brigade escaped without a fight. At about noon, the Italian advance was suddenly turned back by battalions of the XI International Brigade (battalions involved were initially the Edgar André Battalion, Thälmann Battalion and Commune de Paris Battalion – with soldiers mainly from Germany, France, and the Balkan countries). The Italians on the Nationalist side had taken another 15 to 18 km and the towns of Almadrones, Cogollor, and Masegoso. In the evening, the first formations of Italian troops reached the suburb of Brihuega, where they halted to await a wider breach in the Republican lines. This break in momentum, though incompatible with the blitzkrieg tactics they were nominally following, was under the circumstances necessary to allow the soldiers to rest.

The Republican forces on this day consisted of the XI International Brigade, two artillery batteries and two companies of infantry from the 49th Brigade, 12th Division. They had 1,850 soldiers with 1,600 rifles, 34 machine guns, 6 artillery pieces, and 5 tanks. By the end of the day, reinforcements started to arrive as Colonel Enrique Jurado Barrio was ordered to form IV Corps with Líster's 11th Division in the center at the Madrid–Zaragoza road at Torija, the 12th Division on the left flank, and the 14th Division on the right. Vicente Rojo ordered the 2nd Assault Guard Division into action.

=== 10 March ===
The Republican forces received new reinforcements: Italians and Poles from the XII International Brigade (two battalions; Jarosław Dabrowski Battalion and Giuseppe Garibaldi Battalion), three artillery batteries, and an understrength battalion of tanks. The Republican forces now had 4,350 soldiers, 8 mortars, 16 artillery pieces, and 26 light tanks.

In the morning, Italian forces on the Nationalist side launched heavy artillery and air bombardments and without success began the assault on the XI International Brigade. At that point they had committed 26,000 soldiers, 900 machine guns, 130 light tanks, and a large number of artillery pieces. The Nationalists captured the towns Miralrio and Brihuega. The latter town fell almost without opposition.

Nationalist attacks on XI and XII International Brigades continued in the afternoon, still without success. At Torija, the Nationalists faced the Italian Garibaldi Battalion. Italians in the Garibaldi Battalion encouraged the Fascist soldiers to join the Republicans. The attacks halted toward evening, and the Italian Nationalists built defensive positions.

At the end of the day, Lacalle resigned his command, officially for health reasons, but probably because of his resentment at being passed over by Jurado. Command of 12th Division went to the Italian communist Nino Nanetti.

=== 11 March ===
The Italians began a successful advance on the positions of XI and XII International Brigades, who retreated down the main road. The Italian vanguard stopped 3 km before the town of Torija. The Spanish Nationalist division "Soria" captured the towns of Hita and Torre del Burgo.

== Republican counterattacks ==
=== 12 March ===
The Republican forces under Líster's command redeployed in the morning and launched a counterattack at noon. Close to one-hundred "Chato" and "Rata" fighter planes and two squadrons of Katiuska bombers of the Spanish Republican Air Force had been made available at the Albacete airfield. While the aircraft of the Italian Legionary Air Force were grounded on water-logged airports, the Republicans did not have this problem since the Albacete airfield had a concrete strip.

After an air bombardment of the Italian positions, the Republican infantry supported by T-26 and BT-5 light tanks attacked the Italian lines. Several Italian tankettes were lost when General Roatta attempted to change the position of his motorized units in the muddy terrain; many got stuck and were easy target for strafing fighters. The advance reached Trijueque. An Italian counterattack did not regain lost terrain.

=== 13 March ===
The Republican counterattack on Trijueque and Casa del Cabo, Palacio de Ibarra was launched with some success. The plan under Vicente Rojo was to concentrate 11th Division under Líster and all armoured units on the Zaragoza road, while 14th Division under Mera crossed the Tajuña River to attack Brihuega. The Italians were warned that this might happen, but ignored advice from the Spanish chief of operations, Colonel Barroso.

=== 14–17 March ===
On 14 March, most Republican infantry formations rested while their air forces executed successful attacks. The International Brigade captured the Palacio de Ibarra. In the subsequent days the Republicans redeployed and concentrated their forces.

The Republican forces now consisted of some 20,000 soldiers, 17 mortars, 28 artillery pieces, 60 light tanks and 70 planes.

The Italian and Spanish Nationalist forces consisted of some 45,000 soldiers, 70 mortars, 200 artillery pieces, 80 light tanks (L3 tankettes), and 50 planes.

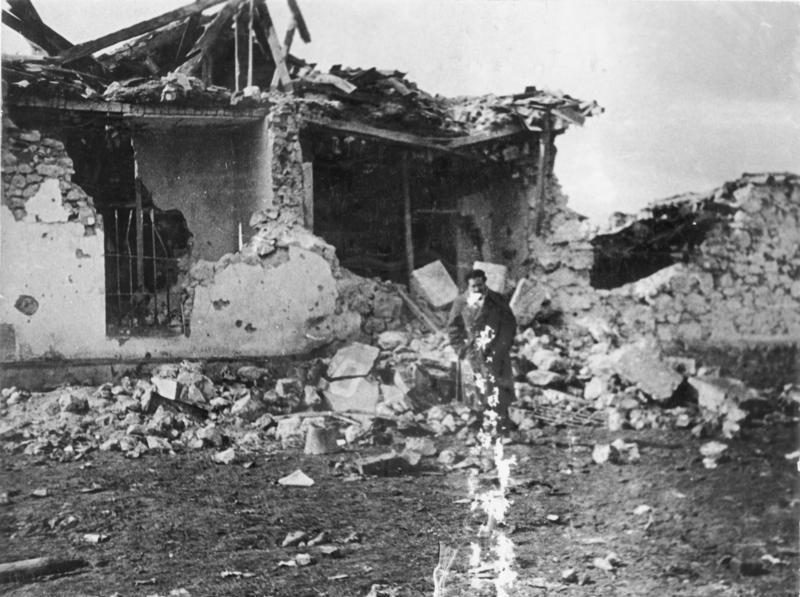
Destruction in aftermath of the battle

=== 18 March ===
At dawn, Vicente Rojo gave the orders and Mera led the 14th Division across the pontoon bridge over the Tajuña River. They had cover from heavy sleet, but the weather also delayed the assault. After midday, the weather had improved enough to allow the Republican air force to operate. At around 13:30, Jurado gave the order to attack. Líster was slowed by the Italian Littorio Division, largely considered to be the best of the Italian units. The 14th Division managed to surround Brihuega, and the Italians retreated in panic. The remaining Italian soldiers were cleared out by the Assault Guards and XI International Brigade.

An Italian counterattack on Republican positions failed and was repulsed by the Assault Guard Division, arguably the best of the Spanish Republican units. The attack by the Assault Guard Division was spearheaded by the 1st Assault Brigade to devastating effect, inflicting heavy losses on the Italians. The Littorio Division saved the Italians from a complete disaster when they conducted a well-organized retreat.

=== 19–23 March ===
The Republican forces recaptured the cities of Gajanejos and Villaviciosa de Tajuña. Their counter-offensive was ultimately halted on the Valdearenas–Ledanca–Hontanares line, because Franco had sent reserve formations to settle the line of defence between Ledanca and Hontanares.

== Aftermath ==
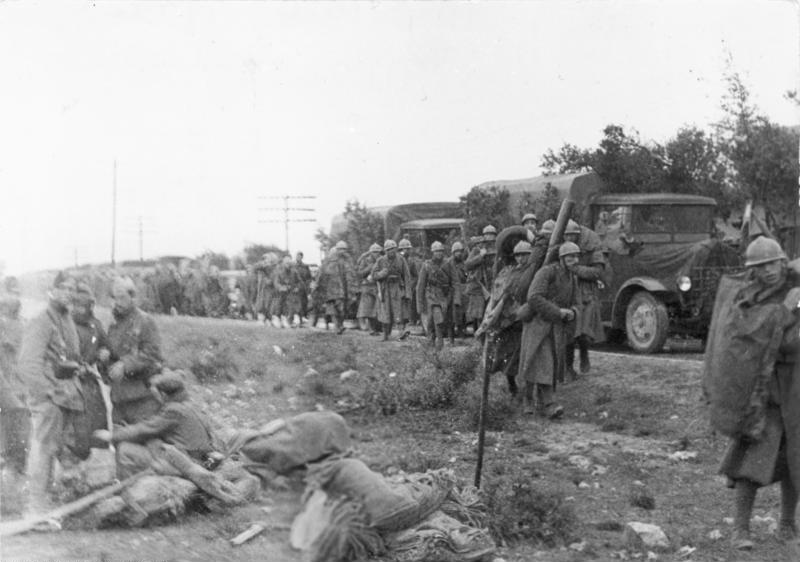
Nationalist forces at Guadalajara.

The Battle of Guadalajara was an important strategic victory of the Republican Army and did much to lift morale. Herbert Matthews claimed in The New York Times that Guadalajara was "to Fascism what the defeat at Bailén had been to Napoleon." The British press heaped scorn on this "new Caporetto"—alluding to a great Italian defeat in the First World War—while former British prime minister David Lloyd George wrote mockingly of the "Italian skedaddle," infuriating Mussolini.

The Italian CTV lost some 3,000 men (Spanish Nationalist losses were marginal) and a considerable number of light tanks. In addition, the Republican army captured sizeable quantities of badly needed materiel, including 65 artillery pieces, 500 machine guns, 67 trucks and vehicles, 13 mortars, 10 tanks, and plenty of ammunition. Strategically, the Republican victory prevented the encirclement of Madrid, ending Franco's hopes of crushing the Republic with a decisive strike at its capital. Franco decided to adopt a new strategy of chipping away at the Republican territories, starting in the north.

Above all, Guadalajara was a setback to Italian morale and a loss of prestige for Italy's fascist regime, whose Duce had orchestrated the deployment of the Italian army in the hopes of stunning the world with a show of Italy's "iron military strength." In response, Franco (who feared CTV strategic independence, especially after the Italian victory at Malaga) announced his intention to dismantle the Italian field army in Spain, seeking to disperse it among Spanish Nationalist units. This threat was not ultimately carried out and Guadalajara in a sense guaranteed and continued Italian aid as Mussolini sought final victory to efface his humiliation at Guadalajara.

Franco, who was uncomfortable with the prospect of the CTV successfully crushing the Republic forces by itself (he believed this would give the impression that the fall of Madrid was wholly creditable to a foreign army) brimmed with Schadenfreude over his allies' humiliation. Officers in General Moscardó's HQ raised a toast to "Spanish heroism, of whatever colour"—probably the only time Nationalist forces toasted a Republican triumph of arms. Franco's soldiers began singing popular Italian tunes with lyrical changes mocking the defeated CTV. The following chorus, originating with Moscardó's Navarrese, humorously takes the Italians to task for their earlier complaints about the lack of motorized transport in Nationalist ranks:

Guadalajara no es Abisinia, Los españoles, aunque rojos, son valientes, Menos camiones y más cojones	Guadalajara is not Abyssinia, Spaniards, even the red ones, are brave, [You need] fewer trucks and more balls

The CTV may have lost the battle because Franco did not start a side offensive, from Jarama toward Alcalà de Henares, as agreed on 1 March with General Roatta. After seeing that the Nationalists were not attacking, the Republicans were able to redeploy the troops facing Jarama to meet the Italian offensive. Later, when faced by General Roatta, Franco tried to excuse himself saying that his Generals ignored his orders to advance. It is possible he used the Italian troops as cannon fodder to gain time to regroup his troops, exhausted after Jarama. This is explained by Franco's fear of the Italians and their desire to win the war "alone". This also explains the ungrateful songs against the Italians which despite all were decisively contributing with personnel and equipment to the nationalist cause.

=== Analysis ===
British historian Paul Preston identified factors contributing to the Italian debacle:

- The tenacity of Republican resistance. Deceived by the easy triumph of their mechanized columns over underarmed and panic-stricken Republican militias at Málaga, the Italians underestimated the quality and organization of Republican forces defending Madrid
- Inadequate preparation of the Italians—many wearing colonial uniforms—to conditions of heavy snow and sleet
- Lack of paved runways for Italian aviation, which left CTV craft sunken in muddy airfields and prey to Republican aviation
- Overall inaction of Nationalist forces on the Jarama front (a delayed, modest attack was launched on 9 March), allowing the Republicans to concentrate additional forces along the Guadalajara
- The superiority of Russian T-26 tanks, equipped with rotating gun turrets, over Italian tankettes
- Roatta's failure—which Preston describes as grossly negligent—to entrench the Italian corps along its new positions in anticipation of a Republican counterattack

The minimal success of the Italian offensive demonstrated the vulnerability of massed armored advances in unfavorable terrain and against a coherent infantry defense. The French General Staff, in harmony with existing beliefs in the French Army, concluded that mechanized troops were not decisive in modern warfare and continued to shape military doctrine accordingly. An exception was Charles de Gaulle. The Germans incorrectly ascribed the Guadalajara failure to leadership and planning. The German attaché to the CTV praised the combat attitude of the Italian troops.

In truth, both views have merit: armoured forces were largely ineffective against deep prepared defenses; in adverse weather, and without enough air support, the result was disaster (Italian strategists failed to consider these variables). But the German assessment noted the deficiencies in Italian weaponry, planning, and organization that contributed to the defeat at Guadalajara. In particular, vehicles and tanks lacked the technical quality, and leaders the determination, to effect the violent breakthroughs characteristic of later German blitzkrieg tactics.

=== Re-organisation of the CTV ===
After the battle, the Italian corps was given a badly needed re-organisation - according to Gooch, at the time of Guadalajara it was "a motley crew", 25% of whom had criminal records and 15% were over forty years old. The corps commander was sacked and replaced, two Black Shirt divisions were dissolved, 3,700 troops were returned to Italy as unfit, discipline (which had become "very relaxed") was improved, and instructions were issued to division commanders on fighting a modern combined arms war. Also, Mussolini from December 1937 ruled the CTV should no longer be used in attrition battles - where there was the risk of units breaking due to exhaustion or weight of losses - and could only be committed in decisive battles. After these improvements and changes in doctrine, the combat performance of the CTV improved, and Guadalajara was to be the only major defeat for Italy in the Spanish Civil War.

== See also ==
- List of Spanish Republican military equipment of the Spanish Civil War
- List of weapons of the Corpo Truppe Volontarie
- List of Spanish Nationalist military equipment of the Spanish Civil War
- List of tanks in the Spanish Civil War
