= 98th Mixed Brigade =

- 98.ª Brigada Mixta
- Active: 1 June 1937–March 1939
- Country: Spain
- Allegiance: (Second Spanish Republic) Republican faction
- Branch: Spanish Republican Army
- Type: Infantry
- Size: Brigade
- Engagements: Spanish Civil War: Battle of Brunete; Battle of Guadalajara; Levante Offensive

Commanders
- Notable commanders: Bernabé López Calle

The 98th Mixed Brigade was a unit of the People's Army of the Republic created during the Spanish Civil War. Throughout the war it came to operate on the Madrid, Guadalajara and Levante fronts.

== History ==
The unit was created on 1 June 1937 in Villena, based on the 279th Battalion of the 70th Mixed Brigade. Mariano Elipe Rabadán was to be appointed commander of the new brigade, although he did not take over the unit and Álvaro Gil Moral was appointed in his place, with Mariano Albert Reigada (Note: Mariano Albert Reigada, a cabinetmaker from Madrid, was a member of the National Confederation of Labour (CNT).) as commissar. The 98th Mixed Brigade was assigned to the 14th Division.

In July 1937, it intervened in the Battle of Brunete, taking part in the counterattack launched by the 14th Division in the last days of the battle, which managed to reach the outskirts of the city. At the end of the operations, the 98th Mixed Brigade was transferred to the Guadalajara front, where it changed location several times and did not take part in relevant military operations.

On 31 March 1938, the unit launched a small offensive in the area of Esplegares, where they occupied some enemy positions and the town of Mocasilla, at the cost of some casualties. (Note: At this time it was added to the 33rd Division.) On 28 April, it was sent together with the 14th Division to the Levante front to reinforce the republican units that were there. It arrived at Castellón de la Plana, later moving to Oropesa. On 8 May, the brigade launched an attack against the positions of "La Muela" and "El Morrón", managing to occupy the latter - after suffering numerous casualties - but it lost it shortly after. It was subsequently transferred to La Iglesuela del Cid, but had to leave this locality on 8 May, slowly retreating to the south. On 16 May, the 98th Mixed Brigade was withdrawn from the front to undergo a reorganisation. Shortly after it was transferred again to the Guadalajara front.

During the following months it was attached to the 14th and 12th Divisions. Later, the unit left the 12th Division and was added to the 17th Division, moving to the Torija sector. In March 1939, the 98th Mixed Brigade supported the Casado coup, which brought the war to an end.

After the war, the 98th Brigade's political commissar, Mariano Albert Reigada, was captured by the Nationalists, who shot him in Madrid's Eastern Cemetery on 27 April 1940.

== Command ==
Commanders

- Álvaro Gil Moral;
- Ángel Resa Bueno;
- Mariano Román Urquiri;
- Bernabé López Calle;
- Mariano Román Urquiri;
- Florentino Fernández Campillo;
- Antonio Pedraza Palomo;

Commissars

- Mariano Albert Reigada, of the CNT;

Chiefs of Staff

- Pelayo Cerdá;
- Ángel Pérez Martínez;
- Joaquín Osuna Carretero;
- Luis Gravioto Balbós;

== Bibliography ==
- Alpert, Michael (1989). El ejército republicano en la guerra civil (in Spanish). Siglo XXI Editores.
- Álvarez, Santiago (1989). Los comisarios políticos en el Ejército Popular de la República (in Spanish). Ediciós do Castro.
- Engel, Carlos (1999). Historia de las Brigadas Mixtas del Ejército Popular de la República (in Spanish). Madrid, Almena. ISBN 84-922644-7-0.
- Martínez Bande, José Manuel (1977). La ofensiva sobre Valencia (in Spanish). Madrid: San Martín. ISBN 84-7140-142-8.
- Martínez Bande, José Manuel (1981). La batalla de Pozoblanco y el cierre de la bolsa de Mérida (in Spanish). Madrid: Editorial San Martín.
- Núñez, Mirta; Rojas, Antonio (1997). Consejo de guerra: los fusilamientos en el Madrid de la posguerra (1939-1945) (in Spanish). Madrid: Compañía Literaria.
- Zaragoza, Cristóbal (1983). Ejército Popular y Militares de la República, 1936-1939 (in Spanish). Barcelona: Ed. Planeta.
