= Bernabé López Calle =

Spanish anarchist

- Born: 30 May 1899; Montejaque, Málaga, Andalusia, Spain
- Died: 30 December 1949 (aged 50); Medina-Sidonia, Cádiz, Spain
- Military career
- Allegiance: Spanish Republic
- Service: Spanish Army (1921-1924); Civil Guard (1924–1936); Confederal militias (1936–1937); Spanish Republican Army (1937–1939) (Second Spanish Republic) Spanish Maquis (1939–1949)
- Service years: 1921–1949
- Commands: 61st Mixed Brigade; 70th Mixed Brigade; 98th Mixed Brigade; 136th Mixed Brigade
- Conflicts: Rif War; Spanish Civil War: Battle of Málaga; Battle of Teruel; Siege of Madrid

Bernabé López Calle (30 May 1899 in Montejaque, Málaga – 30 December 1949 in Medina Sidonia), also known as Comandante Abril or Fernando Abril, was an Andalusian anarchist militant who participated in the Spanish Civil War and later in the guerilla campaign of the Spanish Maquis. In the 1940s he led the guerrillas of southern Andalusia, from the Sierras de Ronda and Grazalema, to the Campo de Gibraltar.

== Biography ==
He was born in Montejaque, a small town in Malaga in the Serranía de Ronda.

In February 1921 he left for compulsory military service and was sent to fight in the Rif War, shortly before the Battle of Annual. In Africa he learned how to handle weapons and was promoted to corporal and later to sergeant in the reserve. Bernabé later returned to his hometown and got married. He had three children: Miguel, Antonia and Rosa. At the height of Dictatorship of Primo de Rivera, Bernabé joined the Civil Guard. He joined the corps as a second cavalry guard. Barcelona, the province of Seville and Antequera (Malaga) were destinations where he served as a guard, and it is this last destination that led him to remain in the Republican zone.

=== The civil War ===
At the beginning of the Civil War, his company remained faithful to the government of the Republic, and he was appointed by his commanders as liaison between the Forces of the Republic and the Mayor's Office of Antequera. His brother, Pedro López, was the mayor of Montejaque and a member of the CNT, and in the first days of the war he organized a column to control the Sierra de Ronda. Bernabé also joined the CNT in the early days of the war, something that was not possible while being within the Civil Guard.

Malaga was captured by the rebellious forces at the beginning of 1937, and Bernabé joined the Spanish Republican Army and, together with his brothers, his wives and children, left for the Teruel front. His wife and children settled in Honrubia, in the province of Cuenca. Later he came to command the 61st Mixed Brigade in the Teruel area.

He was promoted to Commander and in June 1938, he was at the Madrid front, in the Guadalajara area, commanding the 17th Machine Gun Battalion of the 70th Mixed Brigade, with an anarchist majority and part of the 14th Division of Cipriano Mera. He also briefly held command of the 98th Mixed Brigade and the 136th Mixed Brigade. Casado's coup brought Bernabé to lead the 70th Mixed Brigade, as Mera supported the coup and Bernabé was one of his trusted men. Despite the success of the coup to nullify the power of Juan Negrín and the communists, peace was not negotiated and they surrendered. Bernabé dissolved the 70th Mixed Brigade and left Madrid.

=== End of the fight ===
He did not go into exile like many republican fighters, instead moving to Honrubia with his family, where he presented himself to the new authorities. He was put on trial, imprisoned and expelled from the Civil Guard. He eventually regained his freedom and returns to Montejaque, but a complaint from a Falangist caused a search and arrest warrant to be issued against him. A warning before they went after him made Bernabé flee from his house, unwilling to go back to jail for fabricated crimes.

=== Escape to the mountains ===
The Civil Guard found his location and in a confrontation in the mountains they managed to wound him. Bernabé managed to flee and his eldest son decided to accompany him so as not to have to enter the army to do compulsory military service. The Serranía de Ronda welcomed scattered parties of guerrillas, which Bernabé contacted.

Local landowners and proprietors were kidnapped to collect fast ransoms that helped to maintain the necessary financing for the Guerrillas. Sabotages occurred as well as guerrilla propaganda to the peasants, which in the end, was what was sought to capture them. The long-awaited intervention of the allies led to the creation in 1945 of the National Junta of Antifascist Guerrillas, with members without ideological distinction. In 1946, the Alliance of Democratic Forces was constituted, under the command of Bernabé, where he became known as "Commander April".

Bernabé tried to unite combatants despite their political differences, achieving great cohesion among his men, but his libertarian ideas did not square with the line followed by another guerrilla leader from the PCE, Pablo Pérez Hidalgo. The differences between the two caused the forces to be divided. Bernabé and his men settled in the Cádiz area, Pablo and his men went to the Malaga part.

In 1947, the Decree-Law for the repression of banditry and terrorism established the slogan of the "Law of escapes", aggravating the fight against the guerrillas and their supporters. The Civil Guard had a free hand to execute anyone suspected of supporting the guerrillas, and of course, the guerrillas themselves. The famous counterparts were also created, which consisted of groups of Civil Guards pretending to be guerrillas, carrying weapons and clothing similar to those of the mountains. Its mission was to unmask the links and discredit the true guerrillas by carrying out unpopular actions among the population. In 1949 the "Agrupación Fermín Galán" was created, bringing together the parties in the area. Bernabé was elected head of the Association and Pablo Pérez Hidalgo head of the General Staff. The stable camp of the newly created Agrupación was in the Medina Sidonia area.

=== Death ===
Francisco Fernández Cornejo "Largo Mayo", allegedly left the camp in search of supplies, but deserted and appeared at the Civil Guard barracks seeking the promise of pardon if he betrayed his companions. "Largo Mayo" was dressed as a Civil Guard, and in the company of these, he led the forces to the camp of Bernabé.

On 30 December 1949 they waited until dawn after surrounding the camp where six guerrillas were spending the night. The bombs and the shots from the twenty guards killed Juan Ruiz Huercano in the first attack and wounded Bernabé who covered the withdrawal of the survivors, including his son, and held on until his life was ended. Twenty-three bullet holes were in his body when they found him. They loaded the bodies of the two dead guerrillas onto a mule and, in full view of the entire town, they dumped them in an area of the Medina Sidonia cemetery.

== Bibliography ==
- Pérez Regordán, Manuel (1987). El maquis en la provincia de Cádiz.
- Pons Prades, Eduardo (1977). Guerrillas españolas 1936–1960. Editorial Planeta. ISBN 84-320-5634-0.
