= José Luzón Morales =

Spanish anarchist militant

- Died: 1948; Toulouse, France
- Military career
- Allegiance: CNT
- Service: Confederal militias (1936-1937), Spanish Republican Army (1937-1939)
- Service years: 1936-1939
- Units: Spartacus Battalion (1936-1937); 70th Mixed Brigade (1937-1939); 33rd Division (1939)
- Conflicts: Spanish Civil War

José Luzón Morales was a Spanish anarchist militant who was part of the "Spartacus" battalion in the Spanish Civil War.

== Biography ==
A member of the National Confederation of Labor (Spanish: Confederación Nacional del Trabajo, CNT), after the outbreak of the Spanish Civil War he joined the confederal militias.

He was part of the "Spartacus" battalion, of anarcho-syndicalist affiliation. Later he became an honorary officer of the National Republican Guard (Spanish: Guardia Nacional Republicana, GNR), where he chaired the GNR purification commission. Luzón established a prison for former Civil Guards in a Salesian convent in Madrid. (Note: In November 1936 he was implicated in the execution of more than fifty former civil guards, who were shot without cause in the Eastern Cemetery; These civil guards, who were imprisoned in the Santa Engracia convent jail, were initially going to be transferred to Guadalajara.) In mid-1937 he received the command of the 70th Mixed Brigade, which, integrated into the 14th Division, took part in the Battle of Brunete. In March 1939, after the Casado coup, he was appointed commander of the 33rd Division. At the end of the war, he fled Spain by plane, moving to Oran. (Note: Along with other prominent anarchists such as Cipriano Mera, Antonio Verardini or Mariano Valle.)

In 1945, in the context of the split suffered by the libertarian movement, Luzon aligned himself with the positions of the so-called "collaborationist" tendency. In 1948, he was brutally beaten and arrested by the police in Toulouse on charges of illegal possession of weapons. José Luzón allegedly committed suicide in the cell where he was detained.

== Bibliography ==
- Engel, Carlos (1999). Historia de las Brigadas mixtas del Ejército Popular de la República (in Spanish). Madrid: Almena. ISBN 84-922644-7-0.
- Llarch, Joan (1976). Cipriano Mera. Un anarquista en la guerra de España (in Spanish). Euros.
- Llarch, Joan (1985). Negrín. ¡Resistir es vencer! (in Spanish). Barcelona: Planeta.
- Ruiz, Julius (2014). The 'Red Terror' and the Spanish Civil War: Revolutionary Violence in Madrid. Cambridge University Press.
- Zaragoza, Cristóbal (1983). Ejército Popular y Militares de la República, 1936-1939 (in Spanish). Barcelona: Ed. Planeta.
