= 136th Mixed Brigade =

- 136.ª Brigada Mixta
- Active: 1 May 1937–March 1939
- Country: Spain
- Allegiance: (Second Spanish Republic) Republican faction
- Branch: Spanish Republican Army
- Type: Infantry
- Size: Brigade
- Engagements: Spanish Civil War: Battle of Guadalajara

Commanders
- Notable commanders: Ramón Pastor Llorens; Bernabé López Calle

The 136th Mixed Brigade was a unit of the Spanish Republican Army that took part in the Spanish Civil War. Throughout the war, it was assigned to the Guadalajara front, without having a relevant role.

== History ==
The unit was created on 1 May 1937 in Girona, from regular soldiers, militiamen from the Jubert Division, Madrid defense forces and confederal militias from Barcelona and Figueras. The command of the new 136th Mixed Brigade fell to Francisco Costell Salido and the brigade was integrated into the 33rd Division. Initially, the brigade moved along with the rest of the division to the Andalusian front, although in June it moved to the Guadalajara front.

In November 1937 the 136th Mixed Brigade was assigned to the 14th Division in Guadalajara, remaining in reserve, although on 6 December it was again located on the front line, covering the Cifuentes sector. On 10 February 1938 the brigade faced four enemy assaults against its positions in the Vertice Sierra and Cabezo Cano, managing to repel them. A few weeks later, between 1 and 6 April, it intervened in a small offensive on the Cuenca front that, however, did not bear the desired results. During the rest of the war, it did not intervene again in relevant military operations. At the end of March 1939 the 136th MB withdrew to Madrid, where it dissolved itself.

== Controls ==
Commanders

- Francisco Costell Salido;
- Ramón Pastor Llorens;
- Eugenio Franquelo Ramírez;
- Bernabé López Calle;
- Mariano Román Urquiri;
- Pedro Monné Farreras;

Commissars

- Rafael Sanz Lapis, of the PSUC;
- Isidro Albert Raigada;

Chiefs of Staff

- Francisco Armengol Villalonga;
- Rafael Carretero;
- Serafín Gilart Fité;

== Bibliography ==
- Álvarez, Santiago (1989). Los comisarios políticos en el Ejército Popular de la República (in Spanish). Ediciós do Castro.
- Engel, Carlos (1999). Historia de las Brigadas Mixtas del Ejército Popular de la República (in Spanish). Madrid: Almena. ISBN 84-922644-7-0.
- Martínez Bande, José Manuel (1981). La batalla de Pozoblanco y el cierre de la bolsa de Mérida (in Spanish). Madrid: Editorial San Martín.
- Téllez, Antonio (1992). Sabaté. Guerrilla urbana en España (1945-1960) (in Spanish). Barcelona: Editorial Virus.
- Zaragoza, Cristóbal (1983). Ejército Popular y Militares de la República, 1936-1939 (in Spanish). Barcelona: Ed. Planeta.
