= 70th Mixed Brigade =

- 70.ª Brigada Mixta
- Active: 15 January 1937 – 28 March 1939
- Country: Spanish Republic
- Allegiance: Republican faction
- Branch: Spanish Republican Army
- Type: Mixed Brigade
- Size: Brigade
- Part of: 11th Division (1937); 14th Division (1937-1939)
- Garrison/HQ: Madrid
- Engagements: Spanish Civil War: Battle of Jarama; Battle of Guadalajara; Battle of Brunete; Casado coup

The 70th Mixed Brigade was a unit of the Spanish Republican Army created during the Spanish Civil War. The unit intervened in the battles of Jarama, Guadalajara and Brunete. At the end of the war it played a role in the Casado coup.

== History ==
The 70th Mixed Brigade was established in Madrid on 15 January 1937, reorganised out of the Free Spain Column from Alicante and Murcia, and integrated into the Madrid Army Corps. Command of the new unit was handed over to Eusebio Sanz Asensio.

On 7 February, after having armed all its battalions, it was initially located in Madrid as a reserve to intervene in the Battle of Jarama. Attached to the 11th Division of Enrique Líster, the 70th Brigade took part in the fighting around Pingarrón, between 19 and 22 February; the unit lost half of its troops during these days, without being able to capture the disputed position. It was subsequently moved to the rear, where it was reorganised.

The 70th Mixed Brigade received a new command, the militia major Rafael Gutiérrez Caro, (Note: An anarchist peasant from Carmona, Caro had fought in the Sierra Morena as part of the Andalusia-Extremadura Column.) and was assigned to the 14th Division commanded by Cipriano Mera. The unit was then immediately sent to fight in the Battle of Guadalajara. The 70th Mixed Brigade carried out the main attack on Brihuega, a town it took on 18 March; this action put an end to the offensive of the Corpo Truppe Volontarie. The brigade continued its advance and on 28 March it reached kilometer 98 of the N-II.

Between 31 March and 16 April, it participated in a failed offensive in the area of Tajuña. In July it intervened in the Battle of Brunete, under the command of the José Luzón Morales. On 22 July, it carried out an attack from Villanueva de la Cañada to reach the first houses of Brunete, but suffered a high number of casualties.

In the spring of 1938 the unit was sent to the Levante front to reinforce the republican forces resisting the Nationalist offensive. It reached the front lines on 27 April; it defended La Iglesuela del Cid on 12 May and Alfondeguilla on 4 June. Later it returned to the Central front, where it was again assigned to the 14th Division. Between 7 and 15 January 1939, it participated in a small offensive on the Madrid front that sought to alleviate the situation of the republican forces in Catalonia, but the offensive ended in failure.

In March 1939, the 70th Brigade participated in the Casado coup. On the morning of 6 March, the unit's forces occupied various points in Madrid, including Alameda de Osuna, the Ministry of Finance and the Telefónica building. Subsequently, it fought heavily with the 8th Division in defence of the Jaca Position, which was lost. After the triumph of the coup, most of the rebel forces returned to their original positions, although the 70th Mixed Brigade remained in Madrid in case an anti-Casado revolt occurred again. Command of the brigade passed to Bernabé López Calle, as he was considered more reliable than his predecessor – José Luzón Morales. (Note: Morales went on to command the 33rd Division.) The 70th Mixed Brigade dissolved itself with the surrender of Madrid, on 28 March 1939.

== Command ==
Commanders

- Eusebio Sanz Asensio;
- Rafael Gutiérrez Caro;
- Francisco Arderiu Perales;
- José Luzón Morales;
- Bernabé López Calle

Commissars

- José Ladrón de Guevara

== See also ==
- Free Spain Column
- Mixed Brigades

== Bibliography ==
- Abad de Santillán, Diego (1974). De Alfonso XIII a Franco (in Spanish). Buenos Aires: Tipográfica Editora Argentina.
- Alpert, Michael (2013). The Republican Army in the Spanish Civil War, 1936–1939. Cambridge University Press.
- Álvarez, Santiago (1989). Los comisarios políticos en el Ejército Popular de la República (in Spanish). Ediciós do Castro.
- Bahamonde Magro, Ángel; Cervera Gil, Javier (1999). Así terminó la Guerra de España (in Spanish). Madrid: Marcial Pons. ISBN 84-95379-00-7.
- Engel, Carlos (2005). Historia de las Brigadas Mixtas del Ejército Popular de la República (in Spanish). Madrid: Almena. ISBN 84-922644-7-0.
- Llarch, Joan (1976). Cipriano Mera. Un anarquista en la guerra de España (in Spanish). Euros.
- Salas Larrazábal, Ramón (2000). Historia del Ejército Popular de la República (in Spanish). La Esfera de los Libros. ISBN 84-9734-465-0.
- Sody de Rivas, Ángel (2009). Antonio Rosado y el anarcosindicalismo andaluz. Morón de la Frontera (1868-1978) (in Spanish). Ediciones Carena. ISBN 978-84-88944-80-1.
- Zaragoza, Cristóbal (1983). Ejército Popular y Militares de la República, 1936-1939 (in Spanish). Barcelona: Ed. Planeta.
