= Monastery of Sopetrán =

Ruined monastery in Torre del Burgo, Spain

Coordinates: 40.7986°N 3.07861°W

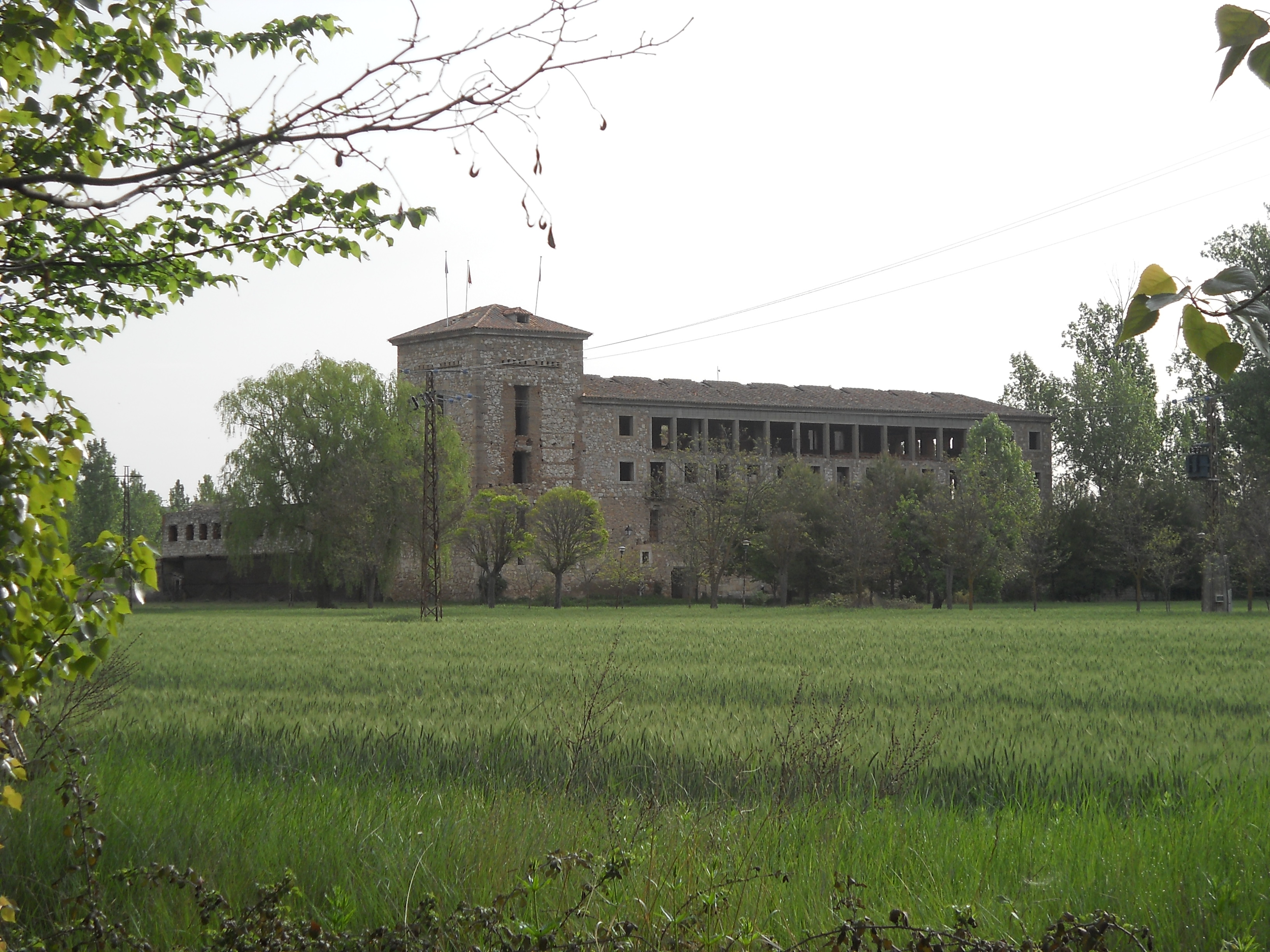
Monastery of Santa María de Sopetrán

The Monastery of Santa María de Sopetrán is a ruined Spanish Benedictine monastery located next to the town of Torre del Burgo, although in the municipality of Hita, Guadalajara. Its origin dates to the 7th century, although the current structure dates from the end of the 11th century. Of the architectural remains, the southern and eastern wings are best preserved. The building is indexed in the Spanish heritage register of Bien de Interés Cultural since 1994.

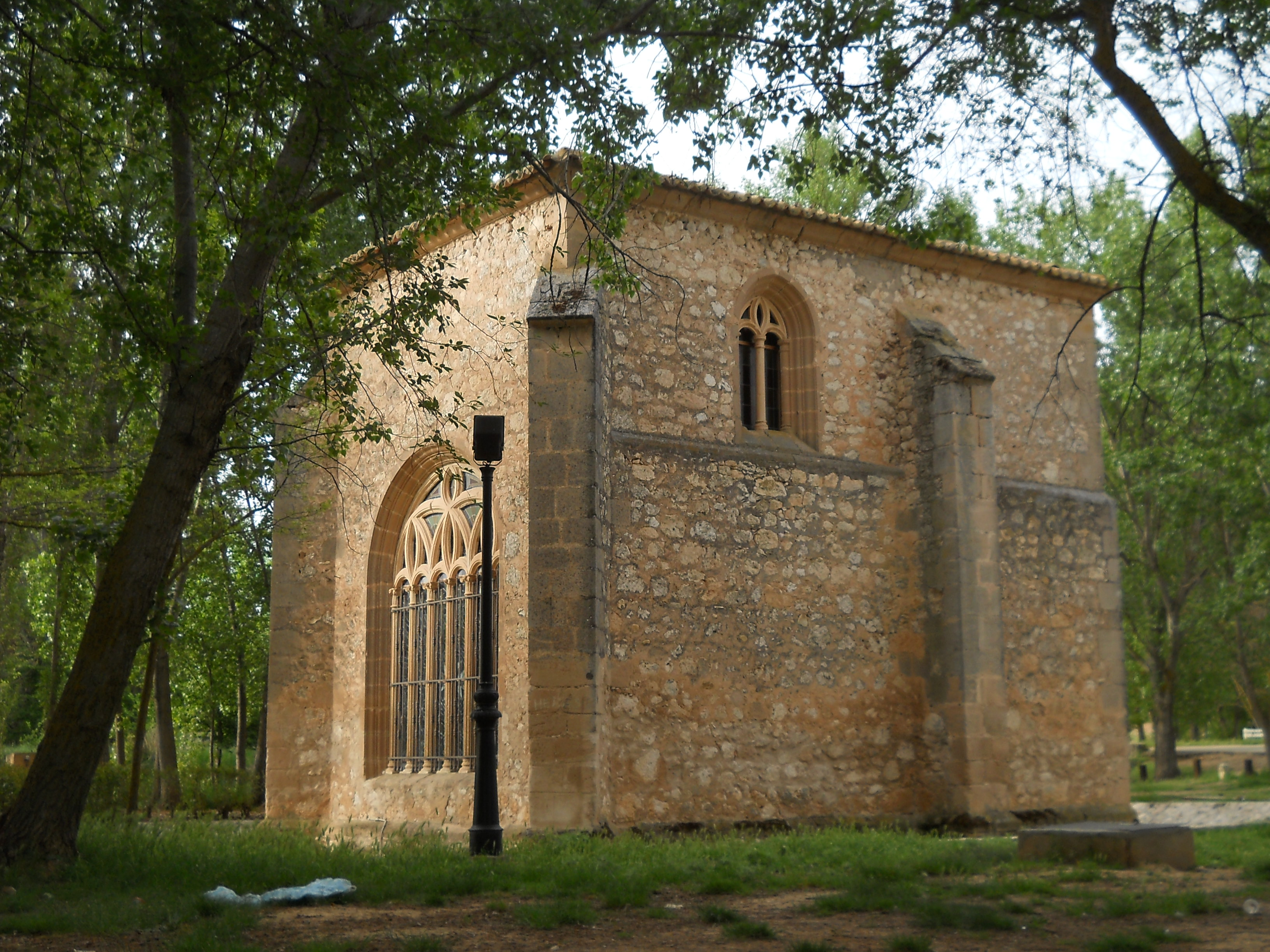
Hermitage

A memorial chapel is located at the hermitage a few hundred yards away from the monastery. Pilgrimages to the well, located under the altar, occur in September.

== Bibliography ==
- Bosch, Lynette M. F. (1 November 2010). Art, Liturgy, and Legend in Renaissance Toledo: The Mendoza and the Iglesia Primada. Penn State Press. ISBN 978-0-271-04381-4.
- Herrera Casado, Antonio (2005). Monasterios y conventos de Castilla-La Mancha. Guadalajara, AAECHE Ediciones.
- Santoro, Nicholas J. (12 August 2011). Mary In Our Life: Atlas of the Names and Titles of Mary, The Mother of Jesus, and Their Place in Marian Devotion. iUniverse. ISBN 978-1-4620-4022-3.
