= 1st Division (Spain) =

1st Division 1.ª División
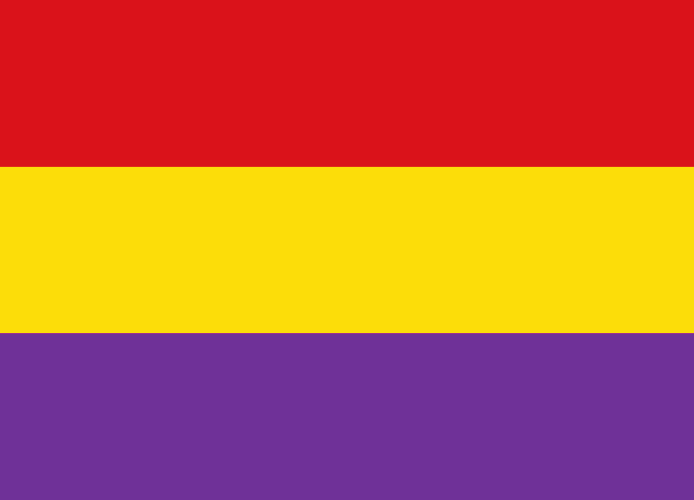
- Military flag of the Popular Army
- Active: 31 December 1936 – 27 March 1939
- Country: Spanish Republic
- Branch: Spanish Republican Army
- Type: Infantry division
- Role: Home Defence
- Part of: 1st Army Corps (1936–1939)
- Garrison/HQ: Lozoyuela
- Engagements: Spanish Civil War

Commanders
- Notable commanders: Enrique Jurado Barrio; Fernando Cueto Herrero (executed)

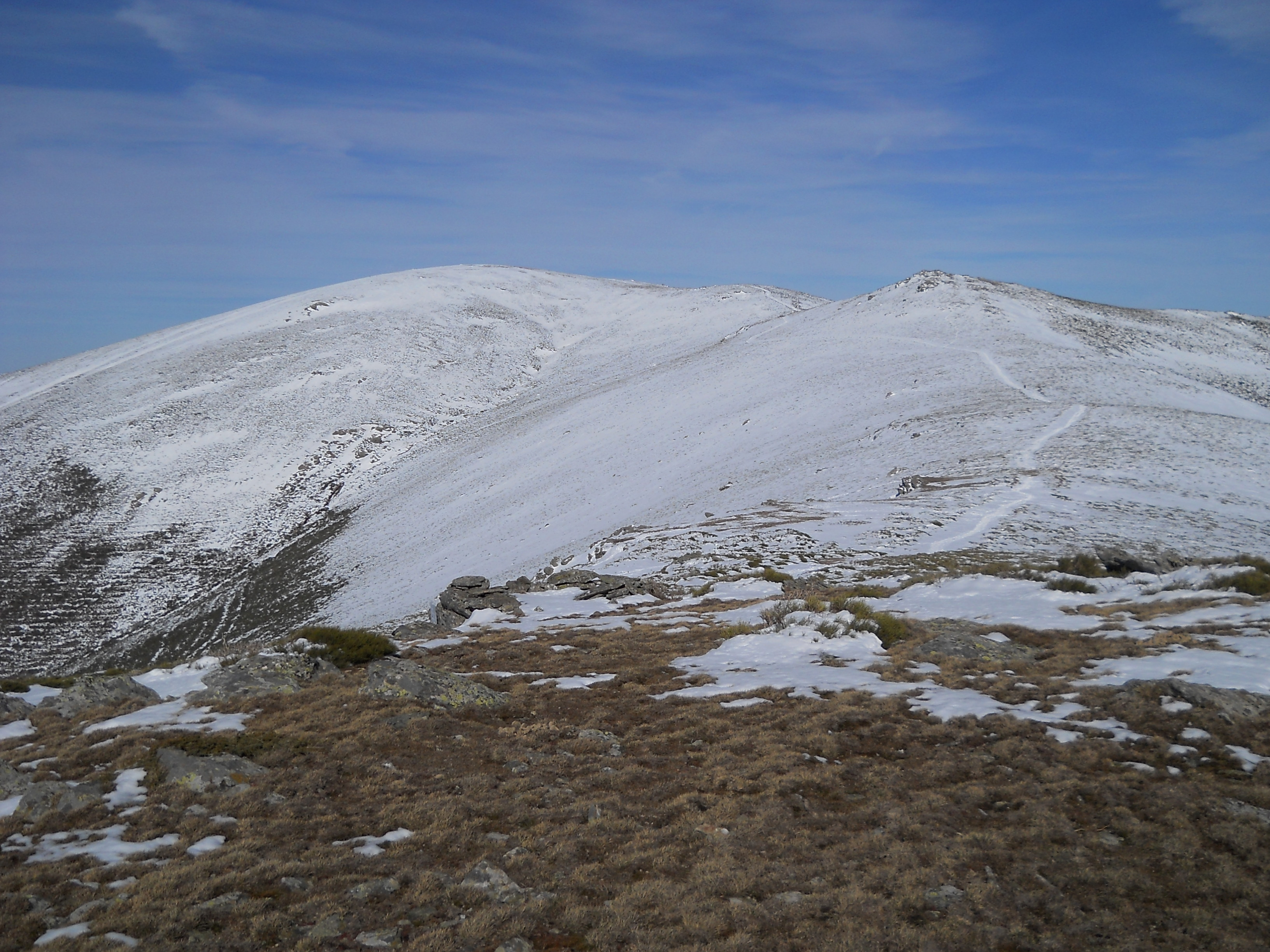
View of the mountains of the Somosierra area in the winter.

The 1st Division (Spanish: 1.ª División) was a division of the Spanish Republican Army in the Spanish Civil War.

This unit was deployed in a relatively inactive front section located in the mountainous area north of Madrid.

== History ==
The First Division was established on 31 December 1936 with the militia forces operating in the Somosierra sector and led by Lt. Colonel Enrique Jurado Barrio. The headquarters of the division were in Loyozuela.

This unit was garrisoned at the secondary sector of El Escorial and did not take part in any important military operation. The commander who replaced Enrique Jurado, Lt. Colonel Fernando Cueto Herrero, was discovered when he was trying to join the enemy forces and was summarily dismissed and shot for treason on 18 September 1937. Except for a few sporadic skirmishes, the unit rarely saw combat action and was mainly engaged in fortification work. The First Division was disbanded at the war's end in late March 1939.

== Order of battle ==
Date	Army Corps	Mixed Brigades	Battlefront
December 1936	1st Army Corps	26th, 27th and 28th	Center
December 1937	1st Army Corps	26th and 27th	Center
April 1937	1st Army Corps	26th, 27th and 28th	Center
November 1938	1st Army Corps	26th and 27th	Center

== Leaders ==
Commanders

- Lt. Colonel Enrique Jurado Barrio;
- Lt. Colonel Fernando Cueto Herrero;
- Infantry Commander Ernesto Güemes Ramos;
- Militia Major Dionisio Hortelano Hortelano;
- Militia Major Raimundo Calvo Moreno;
- Militia Major Juan Sáez de Diego;

Commissars

- Alberto Barragán López, member of the Spanish Socialist Workers' Party (PSOE);
- Victorio Casado Fernández, member of the (PSOE);

Chief of Staff

- Carabineros Commander Rafael Quintana Vilches;

== See also ==
- Mixed Brigades

== Bibliography ==
- Alpert, Michael (1989). El Ejército Republicano en la Guerra Civil. Madrid: Siglo XXI de España. ISBN 978-84-323-0682-2.
- Álvarez, Santiago (1989). Los comisarios políticos en el Ejército Popular de la República. Ediciós do Castro.
- Engel Masoliver, Carlos (1999). Historia de las Brigadas mixtas del Ejército popular de la República, 1936-1939. Madrid: Editorial Almena. ISBN 84-96170-19-5.
- Martínez Bande, José Manuel (1981). La batalla de Pozoblanco y el cierre de la bolsa de Mérida. Editorial San Martín.
- Salas Larrazábal, Ramón (2006). Historia del Ejército Popular de la República. La Esfera de los Libros S.L. ISBN 84-9734-465-0.
- Suero Roca, M.ª Teresa (1981). Militares republicanos de la Guerra de España. Barcelona: Ed. Península Ibérica. ISBN 84-297-1706-4.
- Thomas, Hugh (1976). Historia de la Guerra Civil Española. Barcelona: Círculo de Lectores. ISBN 84-226-0874-X.
- Zaragoza, Cristóbal (1983). Ejército Popular y Militares de la República, 1936-1939. Barcelona: Ed. Planeta.
