= IV Army Corps (Spain) =

Formation of the Spanish Republican Army

- IV Cuerpo de Ejército
- Active: March 13, 1937–March 1939
- Country: Spanish Republic
- Allegiance: (Second Spanish Republic) Republican faction
- Branch: Spanish Republican Army
- Type: Infantry
- Size: Corps
- Part of: Central Army
- Garrison/HQ: Guadalajara
- Engagements: Spanish Civil War: Battle of Guadalajara; Siege of Madrid

Commanders
- Notable commanders: Vicente Rojo Lluch

The IV Army Corps was a military formation of the Spanish Republican Army that fought during the Spanish Civil War. It had a relevant role during the Battle of Guadalajara and, later, during the Casado coup. Among its commanders there were prestigious military personnel such as Enrique Jurado Barrio and Cipriano Mera.

== History ==
The unit was created on March 13, 1937, in the middle of the Battle of Guadalajara. It was organized hastily, the 11th, 12th and 14th divisions were integrated into the Corps, under the command of Enrique Jurado Barrio and mainly Vicente Rojo Lluch. (Note: As a consequence of this appointment, Víctor Lacalle —commander of the 12th Division—, angry that he had not been appointed commander of the new Army Corps, resigned from his post and was replaced by the Italian internationalist Nino Nanetti.) During the following days, the forces of the IV Army Corps managed to stop the offensive of the Corpo Truppe Volontarie, going on the counterattack. On March 18, the 11th and 14th divisions converged on Brihuega with the support of 70 Soviet T-26 tanks; the town was almost surrounded by the republicans when a disbandment of its Italian defenders took place, which left behind many prisoners and war material. The operations continued until March 23. The unit established its headquarters in Guadalajara.

During the rest of the war, it did not intervene in relief operations and remained covering the inactive Guadalajara front.

At the beginning of 1939 the army corps grouped the 12th, 14th, 17th and 33rd divisions into its ranks, under the command of the anarchist Cipriano Mera. The IV Army Corps played a key role in the success of the Casado coup, as it sent several units to Madrid to support the rebel forces in the capital. A powerful column composed of the 35th, 50th and 90th mixed brigades, and under the command of Liberino González, it managed to recover several key positions for the rebels. (Note: After the triumph of the Casado coup, the commander of the IV Corps, Cipriano Mera, was kept in his post by the National Defence Council.)

The unit dissolved itself at the end of March 1939, with the end of the civil war.

== Command ==
Commanders

- Vicente Rojo Lluch;
- Enrique Jurado Barrio;
- Juan Arce Mayora;
- Juan Perea Capulino;
- Cipriano Mera;

Commissars

- Sebastián Zapirain Aguinaga, of the PCE;
- Feliciano Benito Anaya, of the CNT;

Chiefs of Staff

- Aniceto Carvajal Sobrino; (Note: Otros autores sitúan al comandante Félix Muedra como jefe de Estado Mayor.)
- Francisco Arderiu Perales;
- Miguel Rodríguez Pavón;
- Antonio Verardini Díez de Ferreti

== Organization ==
Date	Attached army	Integrated divisions	Battlefront
March 1937	Central Army	11th, 12th, 14th	Guadalajara
May–June 1937	Central Army	12th, 17th, 14th	Center
April 1938	Central Army	12th, 17th, 33rd	Center
February–March 1939	Central Army	12th, 14th, 17th, 33rd	Center

== Bibliography ==
- Álvarez, Santiago (1989). Los comisarios políticos en el Ejército Popular de la República (in Spanish). Ediciós do Castro.
- Bahamonde Magro, Ángel; Cervera Gil, Javier (1999). Así terminó la Guerra de España (in Spanish). Madrid: Marcial Pons. ISBN 84-95379-00-7.
- Engel, Carlos (1999). Historia de las Brigadas Mixtas del Ejército Popular de la República (in Spanish). Madrid: Almena. ISBN 84-922644-7-0.
- Llarch, Joan (1976). Cipriano Mera. Un anarquista en la guerra de España (in Spanish). Euros.
- Marquardt, Hans (1961). Rote Zitadellen: Der spanische Freiheitskampf 1936 bis 1939; eine Anthologie (in German). Berlín: Verlag Neues Leben.
- Martínez Bande, José Manuel (1981). La batalla de Pozoblanco y el cierre de la bolsa de Mérida (in Spanish). Madrid: San Martín.
- Salas Larrazábal, Ramón (2006). Historia del Ejército Popular de la República (in Spanish). La Esfera de los Libros. ISBN 84-9734-465-0.
- Suero Roca, M.ª Teresa (1981). Militares republicanos de la Guerra de España (in Spanish). Barcelona: Ediciones Península. ISBN 84-297-1706-4.
- Thomas, Hugh (1977). The Spanish Civil War (3 ed.). San Francisco: Harper & Row. ISBN 0060142782.
- Zaragoza, Cristóbal (1983). Ejército Popular y Militares de la República, 1936-1939 (in Spanish). Barcelona: Ed. Planeta.
- Thomas, Hugh (2001). The Spanish Civil War. London: Penguin Books. ISBN 978-0-14-101161-5.
