= Castle of Torija =

- Castillo de Torija (Spanish)
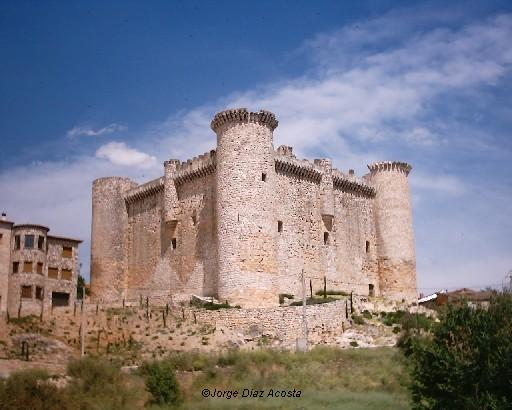

- Location within Spain
- 40.744444°N 3.030278°W
- Location: Torija, Spain

Spanish Cultural Heritage
- Official name: Castillo de Torija
- Type: Non-movable
- Criteria: Monument
- Designated: 1931
- Reference no.: RI-51-0000610

The Castle of Torija (Spanish: Castillo de Torija) is a castle located in Torija, Spain. It was declared Bien de Interés Cultural in 1931. First built by the Knights Templar in the 11th century, today it serves as the headquarters of the Centro de Interpretación Turística de la Provincia de Guadalajara, the regional tourism authority.

== History ==
The castle was built by the Knights Templar in the 11th century, becoming an important fortress in successive medieval wars. In 1445, it was taken by the Navarran captain Juan de Puelles and was subsequently owned by Cardinal Pedro González de Mendoza (1428–1495). In the 19th century, it was occupied by the French under General Hugo, the father of Victor Hugo, until it was taken and destroyed by El Empecinado. Its restoration was completed in 1962.

== Description ==
For a military fortress, it exhibits a particularly impressive level of architecture. Constructed of Alcarria limestone, the rectangular structure has three round towers and a square keep. A well stands at the centre of its courtyard. Its high walls are not very thick indicating that it was completed before artillery came into common use. The main tower which is built apart from the remainder of the structure was the last bastion of resistance. Today the castle houses the Centro de Interpretación Turística de la Provincia de Guadalajara. A museum is being developed on the premises.

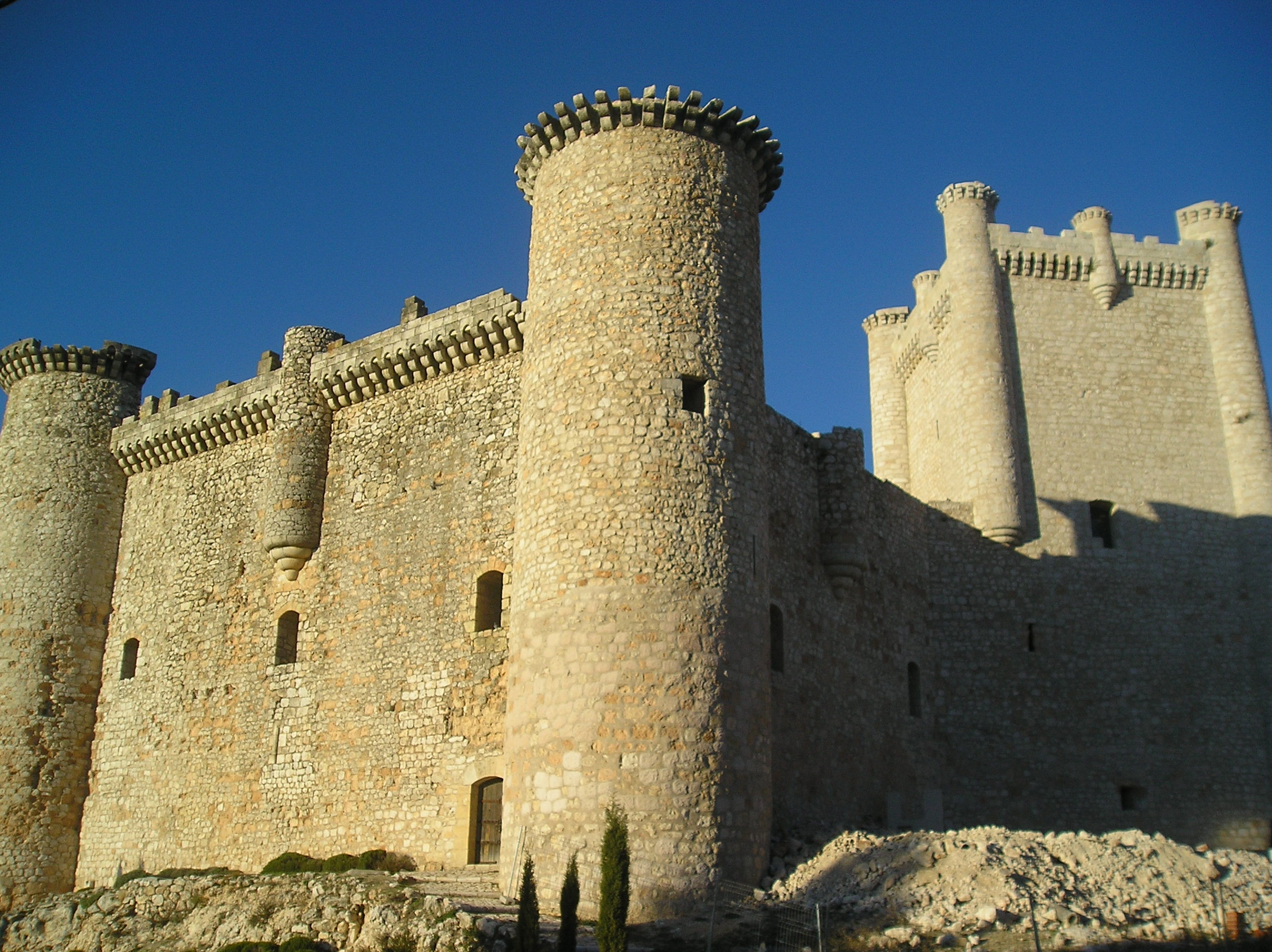

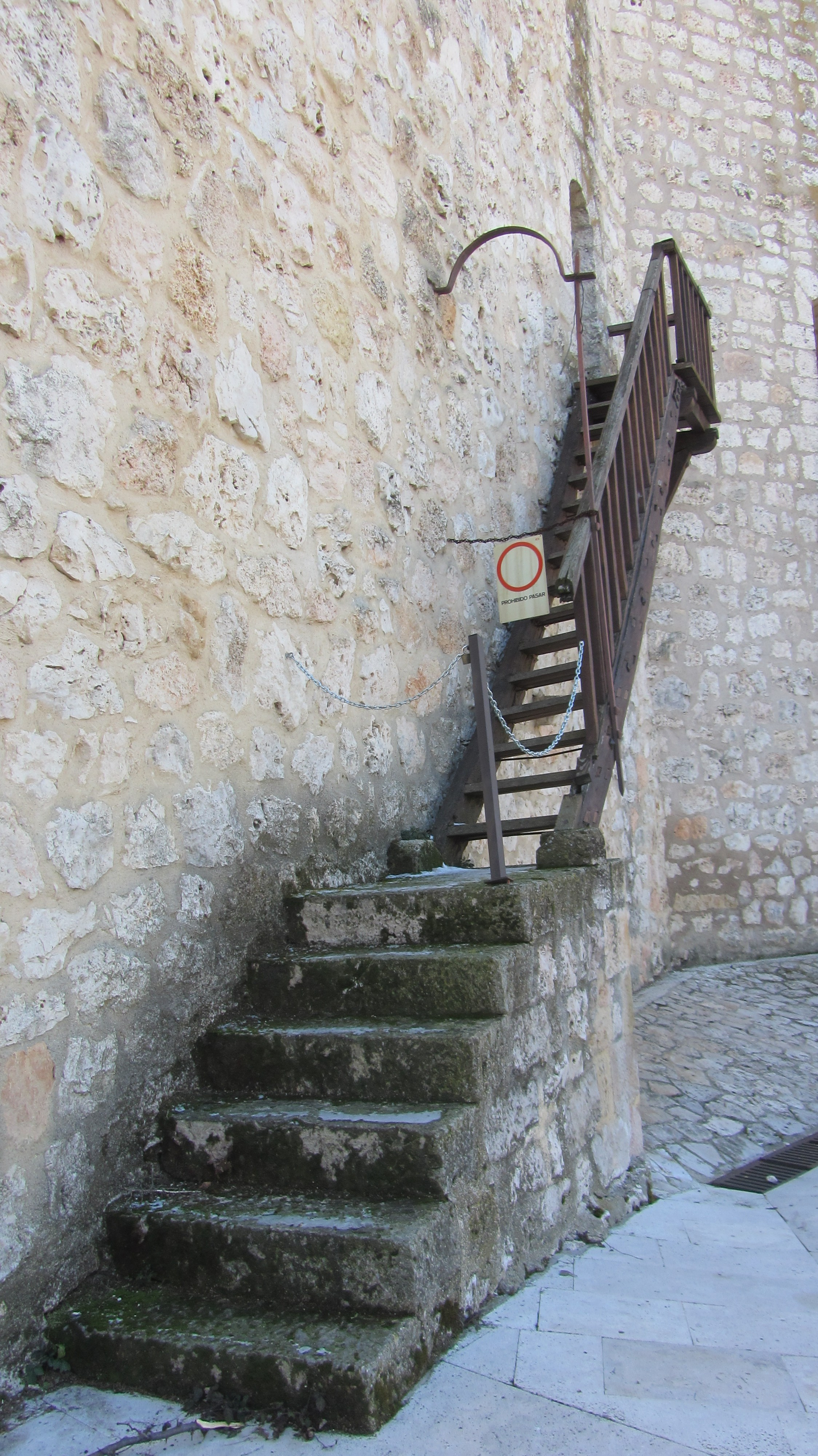
