= 33rd Division (Spain) =

- 33.ª División
- Active: 28 April 1937–27 March 1939
- Country: Spain
- Allegiance: (Second Spanish Republic) Republican faction
- Branch: Spanish Republican Army
- Type: Infantry
- Size: Division
- Engagements: Spanish Civil War: Aragon Offensive; Battle of Guadalajara

Commanders
- Notable commanders: Eduardo Medrano Rivas

The 33rd Division was one of the divisions of the Spanish Republican Army that were organized during the Spanish Civil War on the basis of the Mixed Brigades. It was deployed on the Aragon and Guadalajara fronts.

== History ==
The unit was created on April 28, 1937, as a reserve division of the Eastern Army. Command of the unit fell to Eduardo Medrano Rivas. The unit was later assigned to the IV Army Corps, covering the Guadalajara front. The 33rd Division played a minor role during the contest.

== Command ==
Commanders

- Eduardo Medrano Rivas;
- José Sabín Pérez;
- José Ramón Poveda;
- José Luzón Morales;

Commissars

- José Barberá Bonet;
- José Robusté Parés, of the PS;
- Bartolomé Muñoz Llizo, of the PSOE;

Chiefs of Staff

- Enrique Justo Luengo;
- Luis Vicente Galera;

== Order of battle ==
Date	Attached Army Corps	Integrated Mixed Brigades	Battle front
June 1937	Eastern Army	136th, 138th and 139th	Aragon
April 30, 1938	IV Army Corps	98th, 136th and 138th	Guadalajara
November 1938	IV Army Corps	65th, 136th and 138th	Guadalajara

== Bibliography ==
- Alpert, Michael (2013). The Republican Army in the Spanish Civil War, 1936-1939. Cambridge University Press.
- Álvarez, Santiago (1989). Los comisarios políticos en el Ejército Popular de la República (in Spanish). Ediciós do Castro.
- Engel, Carlos (1999). Historia de las Brigadas Mixtas del Ejército Popular de la República (in Spanish). Madrid: Almena. ISBN 84-922644-7-0.
- Maldonado, José M.ª (2007). El frente de Aragón. La Guerra Civil en Aragón (1936–1938) (in Spanish). Mira Editores. ISBN 978-84-8465-237-3.
- Martínez Bande, José Manuel (1981). La batalla de Pozoblanco y el cierre de la bolsa de Mérida (in Spanish). Madrid: Editorial San Martín.
- Salas Larrazábal, Ramón (2006). Historia del Ejército Popular de la República (in Spanish). La Esfera de los Libros. ISBN 84-9734-465-0.
- Zaragoza, Cristóbal (1983). Ejército Popular y Militares de la República, 1936-1939 (in Spanish). Barcelona: Ed. Planeta.
