= Enrique Jurado Barrio =

Spanish military personnel (1882–1965)

- Born: Enrique Jurado Barrio; 15 September 1882; Madrid, Spain
- Died: 30 March 1965 (aged 82); Montevideo, Uruguay
- Military career
- Allegiance: Kingdom of Spain; Spanish Republic
- Branch: Spanish Army; Spanish Republican Army
- Service years: 1909–1939
- Rank: Colonel
- Commands: 1st Division (1936-37); IV Army Corps; XVIII Army Corps; DECA (1937-39); GERO (1939)
- Wars: Rif War; Spanish Civil War: Battle of Guadarrama; Battle of the Sierra Guadalupe; Battle of Guadalajara; Battle of Brunete; Catalonia Offensive

Enrique Jurado Barrio (15 September 1882 - 30 March 1965) was a Spanish military colonel who fought in the Spanish Civil War for the Second Spanish Republic. Born in a family with a strong military background, Jurado participated in the war in Morocco, and on war merits he was promoted despite his opposition to this type of promotion.

During the war he commanded several military units, leading two Republican Army Corps during the Battles of Guadalajara and Brunete. In the last days of the conflict, he was in command of the General Directorate of Special Defense against Aircraft (DECA) and the Eastern Army Group, which he led during the Withdrawal from Catalonia. After the Republican defeat, he fled to France and later South America. He lived in Uruguay during his final days.

== Biography ==
=== Military career ===
Jurado was a descendant of a family with a long military tradition, however Enrique Jurado is a figure on whom data have always been limited due to the lack of his military file. He entered the Army in 1909, studying at the Segovia Artillery Academy between 1911 and 1913. He was assigned to Africa and went to fight in the Rif War. He was promoted from Captain to Commander due to war merits, despite his opposition to this type of promotion. With the arrival of the Second Republic, these promotions were canceled, and Jurado was demoted to the job of captain at his own request.

=== Spanish Civil War ===
In July 1936 he was an artillery commander bound for Ceuta, although the uprising surprised him in Madrid. He set off to the Getafe artillery regiment, where he was held hostage by the rebels from the base for a few hours. Discouragement spread among the rebels, and Barrio managed to escape detention and take command of the regiment. He then organized an artillery group that participated in the surrender of the camp barracks. He was captured by Alcalá de Henares (20 July) in the defense of the Somosierra sector. On 13 August 1936 he was appointed head of a militia column in Oropesait intended for action against the Army of Africa. On 25 August it advanced and occupied several towns south of Oropesa. On 28 August his column confronted the Army of Africa and was defeated, having to withdraw. On 3 September 1936 he was appointed head of the Somosierra sector, replacing General Carlos Bernal. On 25 October 1936 he was promoted to lieutenant colonel. On 31 December, when the Army of the center was reorganized, the troops under his command became the 1st Division. Jurado was the commander and placed his command post in Lozoyuela.

On 13 March 1937, before the attack of the Fascist Italians of the CTV toward Guadalajara, Jurado was appointed head of the newly created IV Army Corps. It included the Republican forces that defended the front in the province of Guadalajara. They would then participate in the Republican counterattack that defeated the Italians. On 10 April 1937 he ceased in this position due to illness, and was replaced by Lieutenant Colonel Arce. At the end of April, he was appointed head of Operation Extramadura, an offensive intended to cut off the rebellious territory at the height of Mérida until reaching the Portuguese border, which Largo Caballero approved. However the plan was delayed, both by Miaja's opposition to giving up forces and by Soviet advisers, who refused to give up aviation to carry out the plan. The fall of the Largo Caballero government and the arrival of Negrín at the head of the Government caused the operation to be scrapped. On 28 June he took command of the XVIII Army Corps, where he participated in the Battle of Brunete. On 11 July he was replaced by Lieutenant Colonel Casado due to illness.

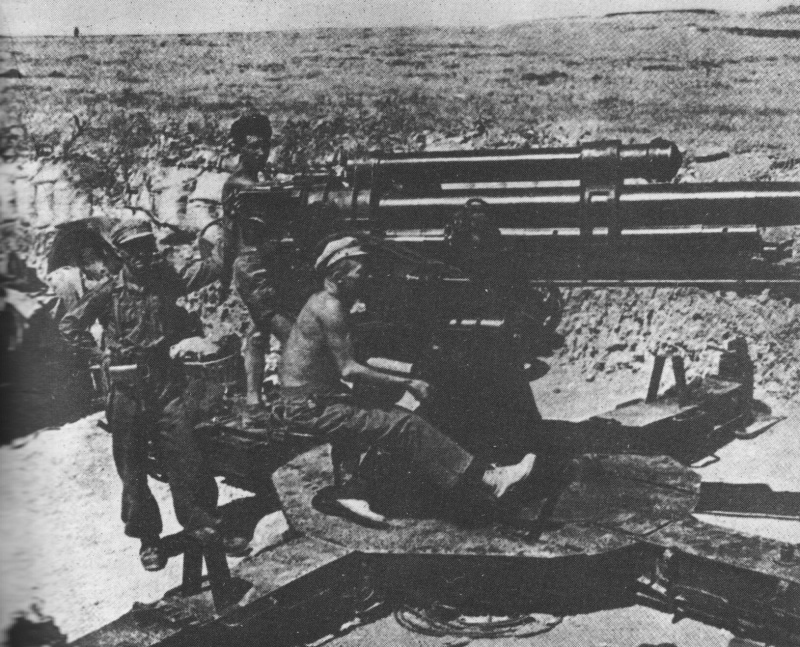
Republican gunners manning an anti-aircraft gun during the Battle of the Ebro. By this time Jurado was already responsible for the Republican air defense.

His next post was between 1937 and 1939 as the head of the General Directorate of Special Defense against Aircraft (DECA), a command where he was promoted to colonel (22 April 1938) and general (16 August 1938). Under his command, DECA was more organized throughout the war. It reached the greatest number of anti-aircraft pieces and operated better. 4 On 27 January 1939, in the midst of the Republican defeat in Catalonia, and with Barcelona already occupied by the rebels, he replaced General Juan Hernández Saravia at the head of the Eastern Region Army Group (GERO). However, with the fall of all of Catalonia, he fled to France in February 1939, where he would remain for the remainder of the war, refusing to return to the central zone, considering the war irretrievably lost.

=== Exile ===
Once the war was over, he would be exiled from various countries, moving to France in 1939, to Argentina in 1940, and finally to Uruguay, where he arrived in December 1943. There he soon found work as Head of the Cadastral and Cartography Service of Montevideo, directing government cadastral teams. In the last years of his life, he organized his memoirs. On 30 March 1965 he died in Montevideo. Later on, his remains were transferred to Madrid.
