= 138th Mixed Brigade =

- Active: May 1937–March 1939
- Country: Spain
- Allegiance: (Second Spanish Republic) Republican faction
- Branch: Spanish Republican Army
- Type: Infantry
- Size: Brigade
- Part of: 33rd Division
- Engagements: Spanish Civil War

Commanders
- Notable commanders: Mauricio García Ezcurra; Ramón Pastor Llorens

The 138th Mixed Brigade was a unit of the Spanish Republican Army that took part in the Spanish Civil War.

== History ==
The unit was created in May 1937 from elements of the 2nd Division of the People's Army of Catalonia, under the command of the Lieutenant Colonel of the Civil Guard Mauricio García Ezcurra. The brigade was assigned to the 33rd Division, initially heading to the Andalusian front and later, to the front of Guadalajara, where it spent the rest of the conflict.

Between 5 and 7 April 1938 it took part in the fighting that took place in the so-called "Vertice Cerro", in the province of Cuenca, facing fourteen enemy assaults against its positions that left the brigade seriously damaged. A few months later, in August, the 138th Mixed Brigade took part in various actions that took place in the Universal Mountains.

During the rest of the war it did not participate in relevant military operations.

== Controls ==
Commanders

- Lieutenant colonel of the Civil Guard Mauricio García Ezcurra;
- Militia major Ramón Pastor Llorens;
- Infantry Commander José Ramos Chiva;
- Militia major José Ramón Poveda;
- Militia major Gabriel Carbajal Alcaide;

Commissars

- Modesto Cubas Perna, of the CNT;

Chiefs of Staff

- Infantry commander Daniel Porras Gil;
- Militia lieutenant Antonio García Manchón;

== Bibliography ==
- Alpert, Michael (1989). El ejército republicano en la guerra civil (in Spanish). Siglo XXI Editores.
- Álvarez, Santiago (1989). Los comisarios políticos en el Ejército Popular de la República (in Spanish). Ediciós do Castro.
- Engel, Carlos (1999). Historia de las Brigadas Mixtas del Ejército Popular de la República (in Spanish). Madrid: Almena. ISBN 84-922644-7-0.
- González Huix, Francisco J. (1995). El puerto y la mar de Tarragona durante la Guerra Civil, 1936-1939 (in Spanish). Institut d'Estudis Tarraconenses «Ramon Berenguer IV».
