= Trijueque =

Trijueque, Spain
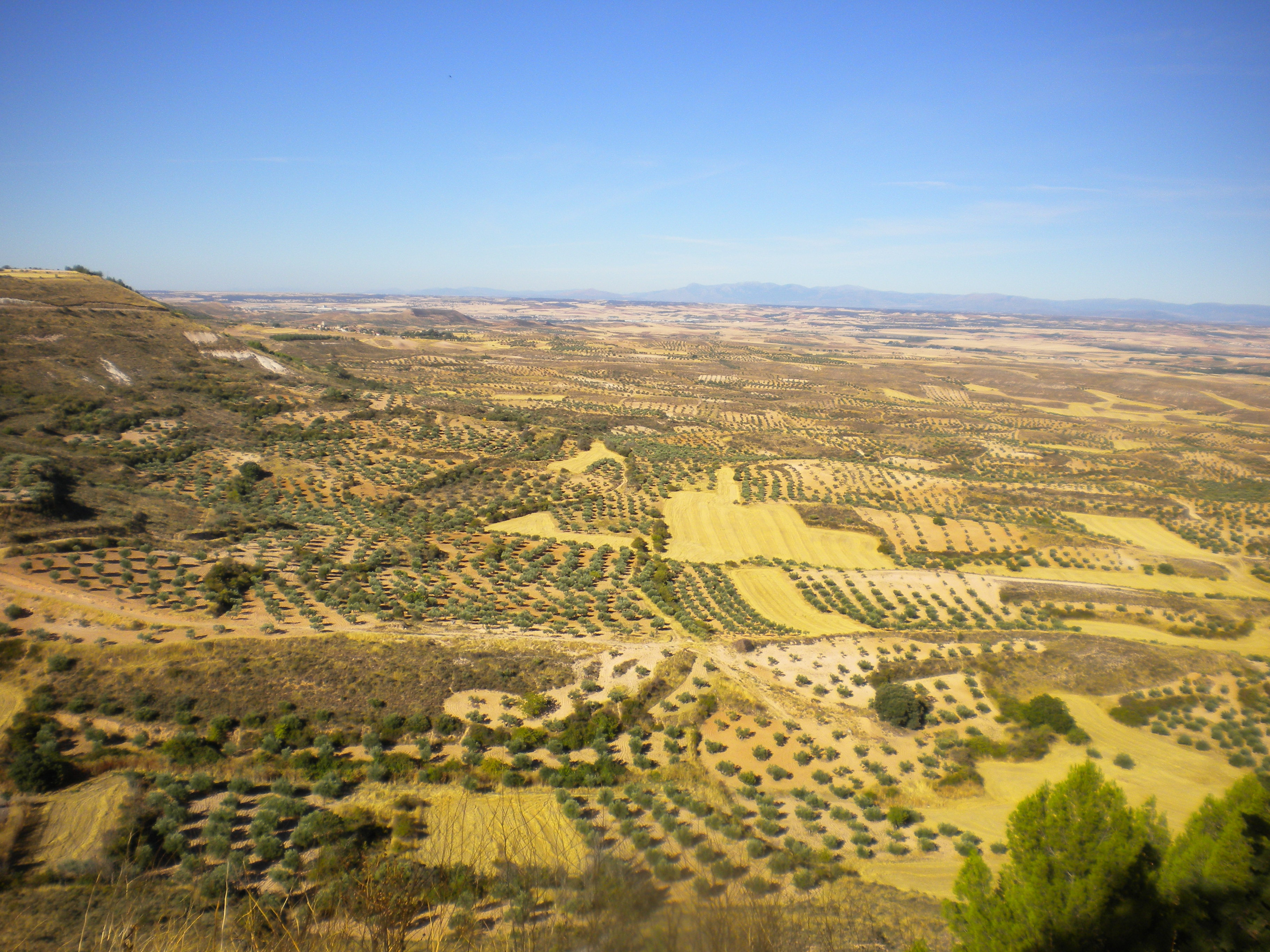

- Coat of arms

- Location within Province of Guadalajara Location within Castilla-La Mancha Location within Spain
- Coordinates: 40°46′40″N 2°59′40″W
- Country: Spain
- Autonomous community: Castile-La Mancha
- Province: Guadalajara
- Municipality: Trijueque

Area
  - Total: 35 km^{2} (14 sq mi)

Population (2025-01-01)
  - Total: 1,737
  - Density: 50/km^{2} (130/sq mi)
- Time zone: UTC+1 (CET)
  - Summer (DST): UTC+2 (CEST)

Trijueque (Spanish pronunciation: [tɾiˈxwe.ke]) is a municipality located in the province of Guadalajara, Castile-La Mancha, Spain. According to the 2004 census (INE), the municipality has a population of 909 inhabitants.

This town was the scenario of violent battles during the Battle of Guadalajara in the Spanish Civil War.
