= Feliciano Benito Anaya =

Spanish anarcho-syndicalist (d. 1940)

- Born: 1896; Tabladillo, Segovia, Spain
- Died: 26 October 1940 (aged 43–44); Guadalajara, Spain
- Burial place: Guadalajara cemetery
- Military career
- Allegiance: CNT
- Service: Confederal militias (1936–1937), Spanish Republican Army (1937–1939)
- Service years: 1936–1939
- Unit: IV Army Corps (1937–1939)
- Conflicts: Spanish Civil War: Battle of Sigüenza

Feliciano Benito Anaya (c. 1896–1940) was a Spanish anarcho-syndicalist.

== Biography ==
Born around 1896 in the Segovian town of Tabladillo, some time later he moved to Madrid, where he worked as a carpenter. At an early age he joined the National Confederation of Labor (Spanish: Confederación Nacional del Trabajo, CNT). Known as «Father Benito», he was part of the «Los Libertos» group of the Ateneo de Divulgación Social.

After the outbreak of the Spanish Civil War he joined the confederal militias. He came to command a column that received his name and that operated on the Guadalajara-Sigüenza front. In the fall of 1936 he participated in the Battle of Sigüenza, although its forces were unable to defend the city from the nationalist assault. He also became a military commander of Tarancón. Later he became part of the political commissariat of the People's Army of the Republic. He came to serve as political commissar of the IV Army Corps, on the Guadalajara front. In the last days of the war he was appointed as commissar of the Central Army.

Captured by the nationalists, he was shot on 26 October 1940 in the Guadalajara cemetery.

== Bibliography ==
- Alcalá, César (2007). Las checas del terror: la desmemoria histórica al descubierto (in Spanish). Madrid: LibrosLibres. ISBN 978-84-96088-59-7.
- Álvarez, Santiago (1989). Los comisarios políticos en el Ejército Popular de la República (in Spanish). Ediciós do Castro.
- Engel, Carlos (1999). Historia de las Brigadas Mixtas del Ejército Popular de la República (in Spanish). Madrid: Almena. 84-922644-7-0.
- Gabriel, Pere (2011). Historia de la UGT IV. Un sindicalismo en guerra (1936-1939) (in Spanish). Siglo XXI de España Editores.
- Llarch, Joan (1976). Cipriano Mera. Un anarquista en la guerra de España (in Spanish). Euros.
- Paz, Abel (2007). Durruti in the Spanish Revolution. AK Press. ISBN 978-1-904859-50-5.
