= Valdearenas =

- Municipality
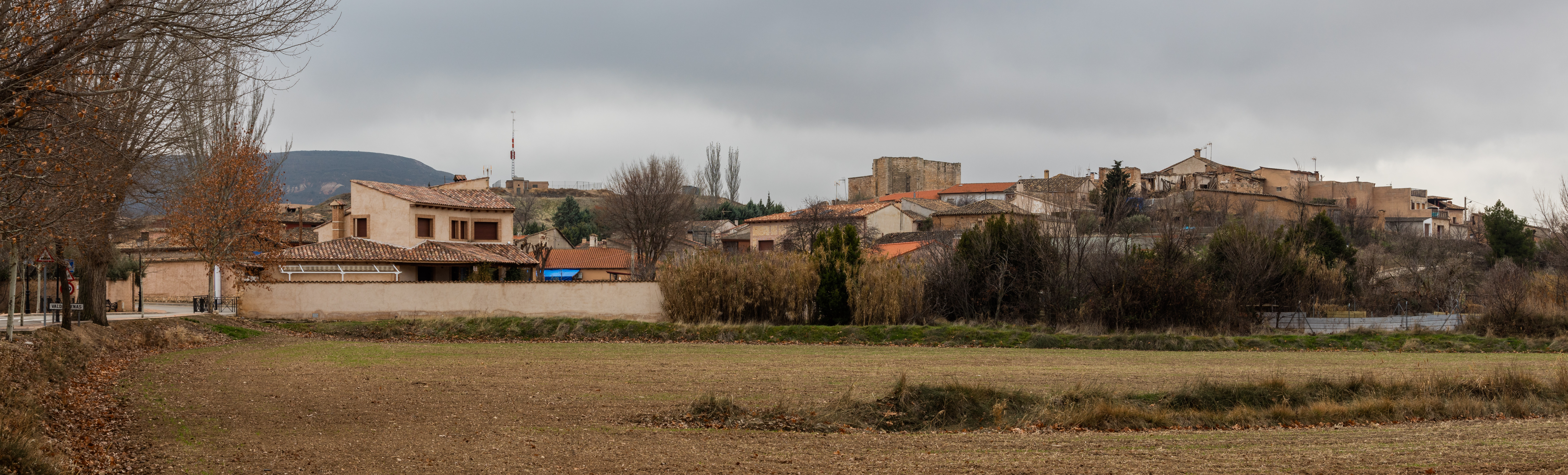

- Coat of arms

- In Guadalajara locality Valdearenas (Castilla-La Mancha) Valdearenas (Spain)
- Coordinates: 40°48′40″N 2°59′27″W
- Country: Spain
- Autonomous community: Castile-La Mancha
- Province: Guadalajara
- Municipality: Valdearenas

Government
  - Mayor: Tomás Gómez Esteban (PSOE)

Area
  - Total: 15.44 km^{2} (5.96 sq mi)
- Elevation: 964 m (3,163 ft)

Population (2025-01-01)
  - Total: 88
  - Density: 5.7/km^{2} (15/sq mi)
- Postal code: 19196
- Website: http://www.valdearenas.es

Valdearenas is a municipality located in the province of Guadalajara, Castile-La Mancha, Spain.

== History ==
After the Castellan troops conquered the Alcarria shire (in the early 12th century), the Badiel valley was colonised by northern Christians, who joined the Moors and Jews who remained after the conquest. The economy was strong, which led to an important political participation.
