= Castejón de Henares =

Municipality in Castile-La Mancha, Spain

Castejón de Henares, Spain
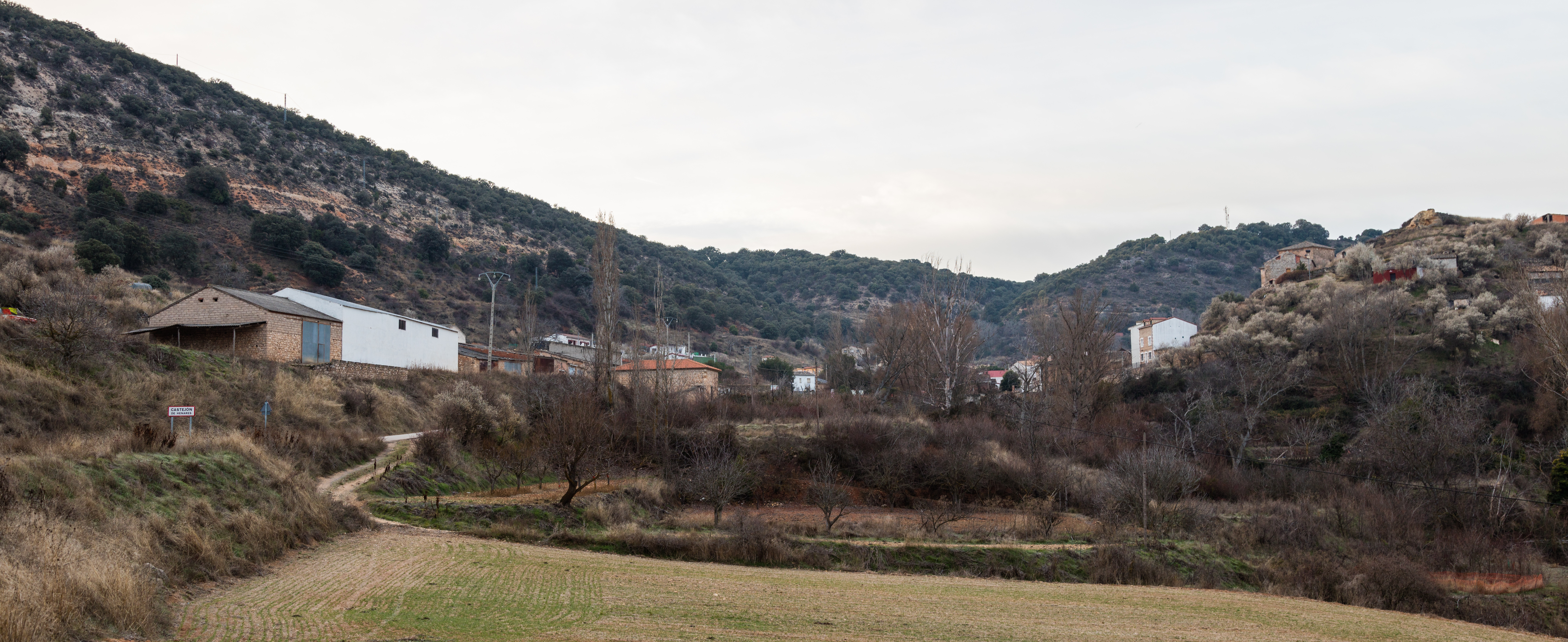

- Coat of arms

- Location within Province of Guadalajara Location within Castilla-La Mancha Location within Spain
- Coordinates: 40°56′19″N 2°47′06″W
- Country: Spain
- Autonomous community: Castile-La Mancha
- Province: Guadalajara
- Municipality: Castejón de Henares

Area
  - Total: 15 km^{2} (5.8 sq mi)

Population (2025-01-01)
  - Total: 62
  - Density: 4.1/km^{2} (11/sq mi)
- Time zone: UTC+1 (CET)
  - Summer (DST): UTC+2 (CEST)

Castejón de Henares is a municipality located in the province of Guadalajara, Castile-La Mancha, Spain. According to the 2004 census (INE), the municipality has a population of 106 inhabitants.
