= Hita, Guadalajara =

Hita
- Municipality
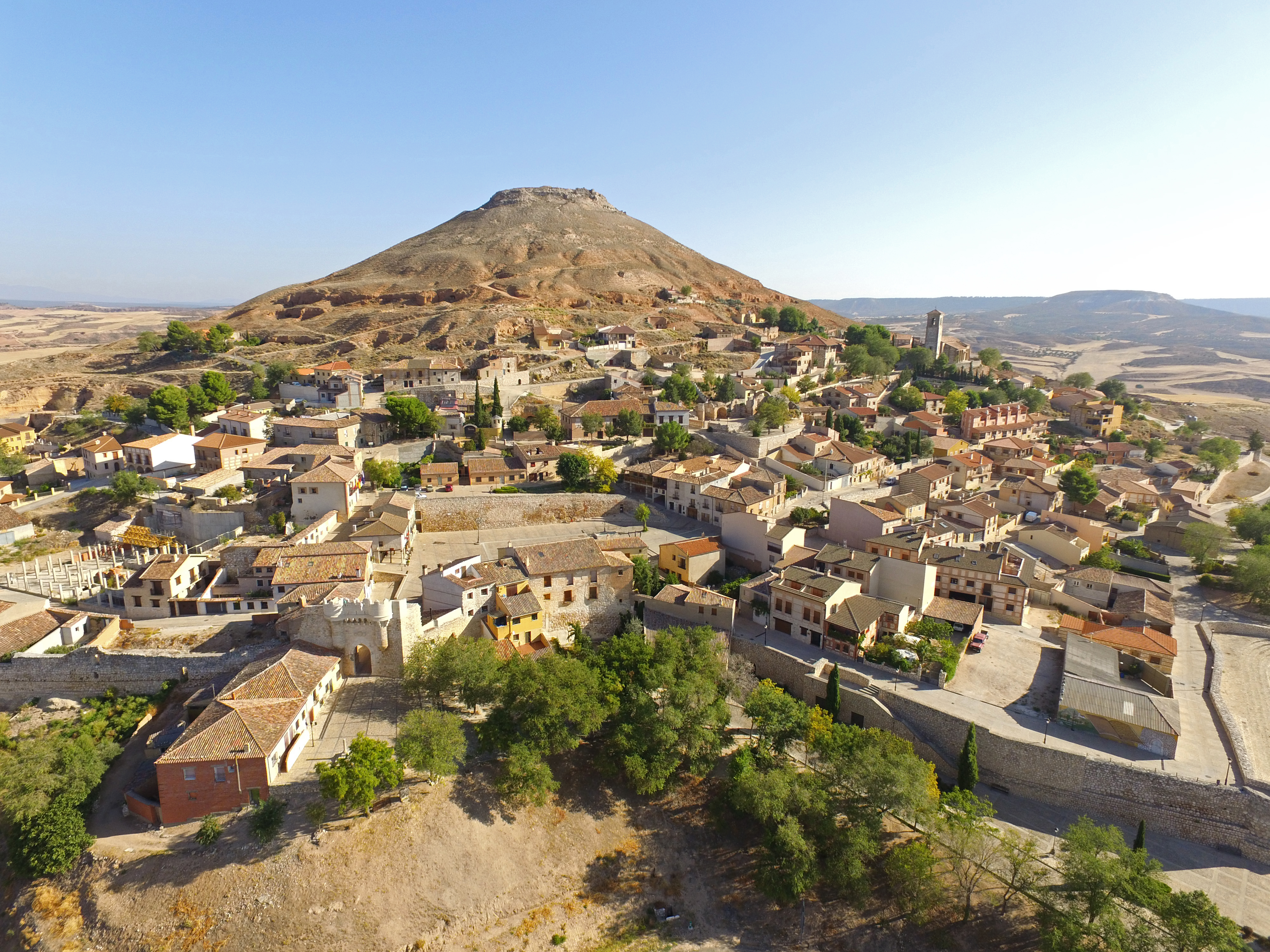

- Flag Coat of arms

- Location within Province of Guadalajara Location within Castilla-La Mancha Location within Spain
- Country: Spain
- Autonomous community: Castile-La Mancha
- Province: Guadalajara

Area
  - Land: 56.49 km^{2} (21.81 sq mi)
- Elevation: 876 m (2,874 ft)

Population (2025-01-01)
  - Total: 336
- Time zone: UTC+1 (CET)
  - Summer (DST): UTC+2 (CEST)

Hita is a Spanish municipality belonging to the province of Guadalajara, in the autonomous community of Castilla–La Mancha. It is part of the comarca of La Alcarria.

== History ==
The Iron Age archaeological site of Cerro Sopetrán is located in the municipality, in the exclave of Sopetrán, close to the confluence of the Henares and the Badiel rivers. The site has been tentatively identified as a possible predecessor to the Celtiberian and Roman town of Kaiseda / Caesada mentioned in Classical sources.

Hita had a Jewish community during the Middle Ages, which at the time of the 1492 expulsion included about 110 households, many owning pastures, grain fields, vineyards, and gardens. While some members went into exile, others converted to Christianity, including prominent converso families such as the Baquex family and Joseph Alazar the elder. Some Jews returned from exile in Portugal and also converted. Some returning exiles (the cases of María de Acosta and Francisco López are documented) faced difficulties reclaiming property, encountering resistance from local intermediaries and officials, including agents of the Duke of Medinaceli, even when the Crown intervened on their behalf.

== People ==
- Fernando García de Hita (d. 1125) was the lord of Hita.
- Juan Ruiz, author of the medieval Spanish poem The Book of Good Love (El libro de buen amor), is known by the title "Archpriest of Hita" (Arcipreste de Hita).

== See also ==
- Monastery of Sopetrán
