= 14th Division (Spain) =

- 14.ª División
- Active: 13–27 March 1939
- Country: Spanish Republic
- Allegiance: Republican faction
- Branch: Spanish Republican Army
- Type: Infantry
- Size: Division
- Engagements: Spanish Civil War: Battle of Guadalajara; Levante Offensive

Commanders
- Notable commanders: Vicente Rojo Lluch; Cipriano Mera

The 14th Division was one of the divisions of the Spanish Republican Army that were organized during the Spanish Civil War on the basis of the Mixed Brigades. The division participated in the Battle of Guadalajara.

== History ==
The 14th Division was partly created from the Mera Column, led by Cipriano Mera, and elements from other Mixed Brigades. The new division was integrated – together with the 11th and 12th divisions – into the new 4th Army Corps, under the command of Enrique Jurado Barrio. The 12th International Brigade — within which the Garibaldi Battalion was integrated – was also assigned to the 14th Division.

Shortly after its creation, the 14th Division, under Vicente Rojo Lluch faced the Battle of Guadalajara. With the support of the other republican divisions, the enemy attack was stopped and a counter-attack began. On 18 March the division, operating on the right flank of the republican front, and the 11th Division of Enrique Lister, with the support of 70 Soviet T-26 tanks, launched an attack and seized the town of Brihuega; the nationalist forces fled in disarray, leaving behind prisoners and war equipment. By the end of March the front stabilised after the Republicans managed to recover a large part of the territory.

In July 1937, facing the Battle of Brunete, the unit was initially placed in reserve. It intervened towards the end of the fighting, after the defeat of Lister's 11th Division. On 24 July it was scheduled to relieve Líster's forces from the front line, although the fighting prevented it. On the morning of 25 July, units of the 14th Division launched a counterattack to the southwest of Brunete, counting on the support of Republican aviation. Despite the resistance offered by the 14th Division, it failed to maintain its positions. Once the fighting in Brunete ended, the division returned to the Guadalajara front, where it remained for the following months without intervening in relevant operations.

In the spring of 1938 it was sent to the Levante front as a reserve unit, acting as relief for other units broken by enemy offensives.

In March 1939 some of its units participated in the Casado coup. This was the case of the 70th Mixed Brigade of Bernabé López Calle, which on the morning of 6 March occupied various strategic points in Madrid, such as the Alameda de Osuna, the Ministry of Finance and the Telefónica building. Members of the 35th and 50th mixed brigades also took part in support of the rebellious forces. The 14th Division dissolved itself shortly after, with the end of the war. Its commander Rafael Gutiérrez Caro was taken prisoner by the Nationalists, who executed him in Alcalá de Henares on 3 June 1940.

== Command ==
Commanders

- Vicente Rojo Lluch;
- Cipriano Mera;
- Francisco Jiménez Durán;
- Rafael Gutiérrez Caro;
- Joaquín Martínez Sánchez

Commissars

- Mariano Valle Soria, of the CNT;

Chiefs of Staff

- Antonio Verardini Díez de Ferreti

== Battles ==
Date	Attached Army Corps	Integrated Mixed Brigades	Battle front
February–March 1937	4th Army Corps	48th, 65th, 72nd, 70th	Guadalajara
June 1937	4th Army Corps	65th, 70th, 72nd	Guadalajara
December 1937	4th Army Corps	70th, 98th	Guadalajara
April 30, 1938	16th Army Corps	206th, 205th and 204th	Tarancon
May 1938	21st Army Corps	35th and 39th	Levante
November 1938	Reserve of the GERC	21st, 35th, 50th and 70th	–
March 1939	4th Army Corps	35th, 50th and 70th	Guadalajara

== See also ==
- List of Spanish Republican divisions
- Mixed Brigades
- Mera Column

== Bibliography ==
- Alexander, Robert J. (1999). The Anarchists in the Spanish Civil War. Volumen I. Janus Publishing Company Lim. ISBN 978-1-85756-412-9.
- Alpert, Michael (2013). El Ejército Republicano en la Guerra Civil (in Spanish). Cambridge University Press. ISBN 978-84-3230-682-2.
- Álvarez, Santiago (1989). Los comisarios políticos en el Ejército Popular de la República (in Spanish). Ediciós do Castro.
- Bahamonde Magro, Ángel; Cervera Gil, Javier (1999). Así terminó la Guerra de España (in Spanish). Madrid: Marcial Pons. ISBN 84-95379-00-7.
- Beevor, Antony (2005). La Guerra civil española (in Spanish). Editorial Crítica.
- Castells Peig, Andreu (1974). Las brigadas internacionales de la guerra de España (in Spanish). Editorial Ariel.
- Engel, Carlos (1999). Historia de las Brigadas Mixtas del Ejército Popular de la República (in Spanish). Madrid: Almena. ISBN 84-922644-7-0.
- Llarch, Joan (1976). Cipriano Mera. Un anarquista en la guerra de España (in Spanish). Euros.
- Martínez Bande, José Manuel (1972). La Ofensiva sobre Segovia y la batalla de Brunete. Madrid: San Martín.
- Martínez Bande, José Manuel (1981). La batalla de Pozoblanco y el cierre de la bolsa de Mérida (in Spanish). Madrid: Editorial San Martín.
- Ruiz, Julius (2014). The 'Red Terror' and the Spanish Civil War: Revolutionary Violence in Madrid. Cambridge University Press.
- Salas Larrazábal, Ramón (2006). Historia del Ejército Popular de la República (in Spanish). La Esfera de los Libros. ISBN 84-9734-465-0.
- Thomas, Hugh (1976). Historia de la Guerra Civil Española (in Spanish). Barcelona: Círculo de Lectores. ISBN 9788497598323.
- Thomas, Hugh (2001). The Spanish Civil War. London: Penguin Books. ISBN 978-0-14-101161-5.
- Zaragoza, Cristóbal (1983). Ejército Popular y Militares de la República, 1936-1939 (in Spanish). Barcelona: Ed. Planeta.
