= Montejaque =

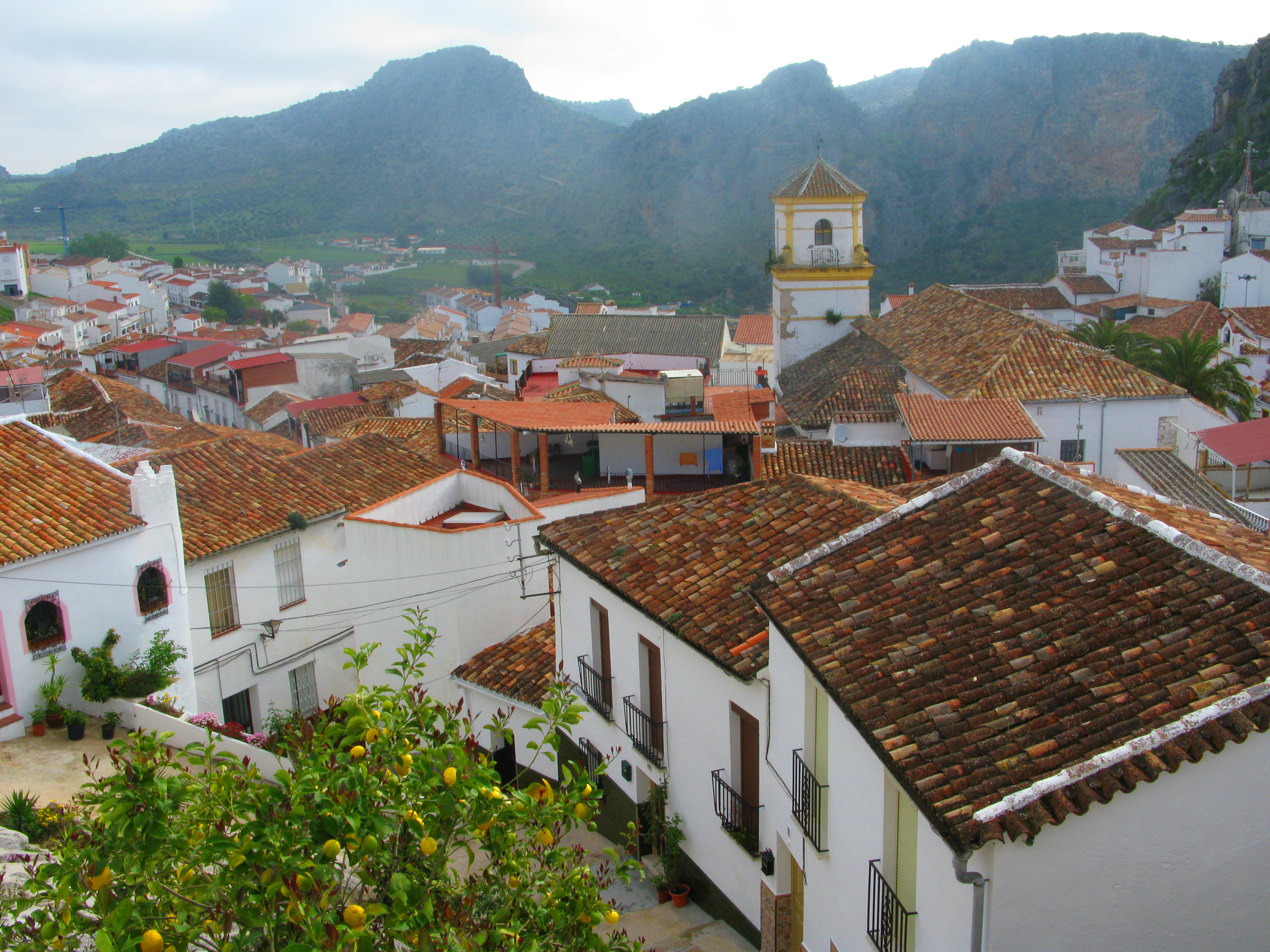

- Coat of arms

- Location in Spain.
- Coordinates: 36°43′N 5°16′W
- Sovereign state: Spain
- Autonomous community: Andalusia
- Province: Málaga

Area
  - Total: 43 km^{2} (17 sq mi)
- Elevation: 690 m (2,260 ft)

Population (2025-01-01)
  - Total: 945
  - Density: 22/km^{2} (57/sq mi)
- Time zone: UTC+1 (CET)
  - Summer (DST): UTC+2 (CEST)
- Website: www.montejaque.es

Montejaque is a town and municipality in the province of Málaga, part of the autonomous community of Andalusia in southern Spain. It belongs to the comarca of Serranía de Ronda. The municipality is situated approximately 125 kilometres from the city of Málaga, 21 from Ronda and only 2 from Benaoján. It has a population of approximately 1,000 residents. The natives are called Montejaqueños.

== See also ==
- List of municipalities in Málaga
