= Torre del Burgo =

- Municipality
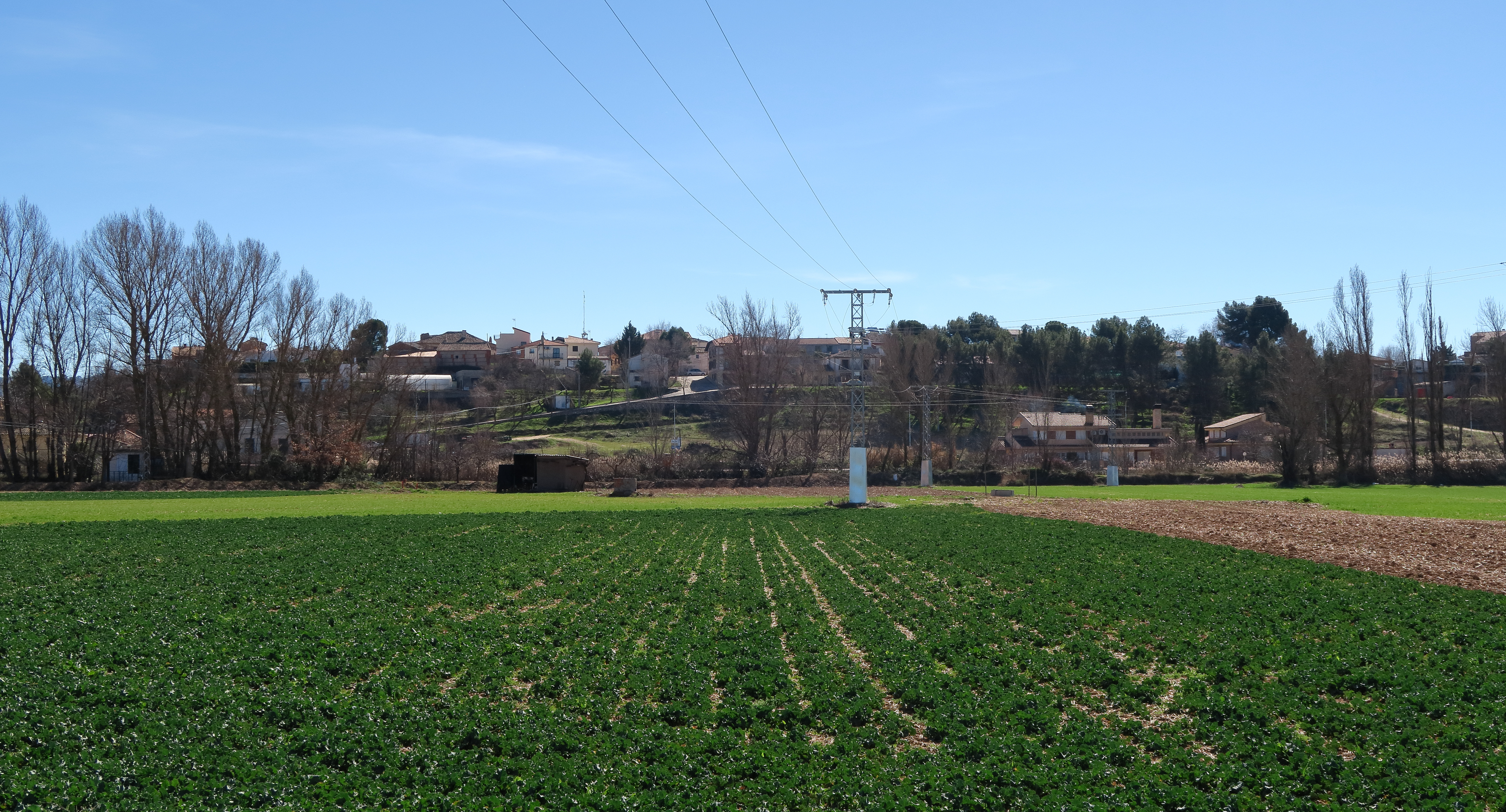

- Flag Coat of arms

- Location within Castilla-La Mancha Location within Province of Guadalajara Location within Spain
- Coordinates: 40°47′39″N 3°04′48″W
- Country: Spain
- Autonomous community: Castilla–La Mancha
- Province: Guadalajara

Area
  - Total: 4.91 km^{2} (1.90 sq mi)

Population (2025-01-01)
  - Total: 494
  - Density: 101/km^{2} (261/sq mi)
- Time zone: UTC+1 (CET)
  - Summer (DST): UTC+2 (CEST)

Torre del Burgo is a municipality of Spain located in the province of Guadalajara, Castilla–La Mancha.

The municipality spans across a total area of 4.91 km^{2}.

As of 1 January 2019, the municipality had a registered population of 592. It was the municipality with the largest share of foreign population in Spain (at 90.7%), the vast majority of them being Bulgarian citizens (84.6%), reportedly drawn to the village to work in the productive asparagus crops.
