= Lozoyuela-Navas-Sieteiglesias =

- Municipality
- Flag Coat of arms

- Municipal location within the Community of Madrid.
- Coordinates: 40°55′N 3°37′W
- Country: Spain
- Autonomous community: Community of Madrid

Area
  - Total: 51.28 km^{2} (19.80 sq mi)
- Elevation: 1,028 m (3,373 ft)

Population (2025-01-01)
  - Total: 1,468
  - Density: 28.63/km^{2} (74.14/sq mi)
- Time zone: UTC+1 (CET)
  - Summer (DST): UTC+2 (CEST)

Lozoyuela-Navas-Sieteiglesias (Spanish pronunciation: [loθoˈʝwela ˈnaβas sjetejˈɣlesjas]) is a municipality of the Community of Madrid, Spain.
