= Cipriano Mera =

Spanish military officer

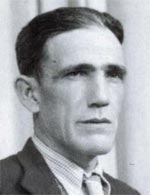
- Cipriano in 1940
- Born: Cipriano Mera Sanz; 4 November 1897; Madrid, Spain
- Died: 24 October 1975 (aged 77); Saint-Cloud, France
- Military career
- Allegiance: Confederal militias (1936) (Second Spanish Republic) Spanish Republic (1936–1939)
- Branch: Spanish Republican Army
- Service years: 1936–1939
- Rank: General
- Nickname: El Viejo (The Old Man)
- Commands: Mera Column (1936); 14th Division (1937); IV Army Corps (1937–1939)
- Conflicts: Spanish Civil War: Siege of Cuartel de la Montaña; Siege of Madrid; Battle of Guadalajara; Final offensive
- Other work: Anarchist activist, Bricklayer

Cipriano Mera Sanz (4 November 1897 – 24 October 1975) was a Spanish anarchist and a military and political figure during the Second Spanish Republic.

== Early life ==
He had two sons (Floreal and Sergio) with his partner Teresa Gómez. A bricklayer, he joined the anarchist movement and presided over the construction union of Madrid of the Confederación Nacional del Trabajo (CNT). During the congress celebrated in Zaragoza three months before the beginning of the Spanish Revolution, he was in favor of the most radical, collaborating sectors of the Federación Anarquista Ibérica (FAI). Mera led a strike of construction workers, electricians, and elevator operators in Madrid in June 1936. As a result, he was imprisoned in early July.

== Spanish Civil War ==
When the Spanish Civil War exploded he was released, and led a column that put down the uprising in Guadalajara, Alcalá de Henares and Cuenca. Next, he defended the dams of Lozoya, which supplied Madrid, and fought in the mountain ranges of Ávila and the valley of the Tiétar river. He was given command of the 14th Division and it acted in the defense of Madrid, the Battle of Guadalajara (March 1937) and in the Battle of Brunete (July 1937). He replaced Juan Perea Capulino in command of the IV Army Corps of the center. In April 1938 he was promoted to lieutenant colonel.

== The end of the war ==
By 1939 Mera was convinced that the Republicans would be defeated. When Juan Negrín refused to surrender to Francisco Franco, Mera decided to support Segismundo Casado, commander of the Republican Army of the center, and Julián Besteiro of the Spanish Socialist Workers' Party to stage a coup d'etat and establish an anti-Negrin, anti-Stalinist National Defence Council (Consejo Nacional de Defensa). In March 1939 he joined the uprising of Casado to accelerate the end of the war and to restrain Communist Party of Spain control of the Republican zone. His forces were fundamental in the victory of Casado in Madrid against the 1st Corps of the Army of the Center sent to defeat the rising.

== Exile and death ==
He marched to Valencia at the end of the war and soon by plane went to Oran and Casablanca, but he was extradited to Spain in February 1942. In 1943 he was condemned to death, a sentence that was exchanged for 30 years in prison, but he was pardoned in 1946. In 1947, he emigrated to Paris, where he worked as a bricklayer until his death in St. Cloud, France in 1975.

== Films ==
He appeared as himself in the 1936 CNT film production "Castilla Libertaria". In 2009, a documentary entitled "Vivir de Pie. Las Guerras de Cipriano Mera" (Living on Your Feet: The Struggles of Cipriano Mera) was released.

== Sources ==
- Beevor, Antony (2006). The Battle for Spain: The Spanish Civil War 1936-1939. Penguin Books. ISBN 0-14-303765-X.
- Christie, Stuart (2003). General Franco Made Me a 'terrorist'. Christie Books. ISBN 1-873976-19-4.
- Preston, Paul. The Spanish Civil War. Reaction, revolution & revenge. Harper Perennial. London, 2006.
