= Spanish Republic at War =

Republican zone during the Spanish Civil War

Flag of the Second Spanish Republic

The phrase Spanish Republic at war refers to the Second Spanish Republic during the Civil War of 1936–1939. It represents the last stage in this war's history. The territory that remained under its control after the coup of July 1936—which was called the republican zone or the loyalist zone—gradually reduced as the rebel zone spread, until it was finally occupied in its entirety by the Francoist side (which had referred to the areas as the red zone throughout the civil war).

During this time, there were three consecutive governments: the one presided over by José Giral, from Republican Left, although during his short term (July–September 1936), real power was actually in the hands of the hundreds of committees that were created when the social revolution of 1936 broke out. The next government was presided over by Francisco Largo Caballero, the leader of the Spanish Socialist Workers' Party (PSOE) and the Unión General de Trabajadores (UGT), one of the two trade unions that had led the revolution. Finally, the third government was presided over by Juan Negrín, also from the PSOE, as a consequence of the fall of Largo Caballero's government after the events of May 1937. Negrín governed until early March 1939, when Colonel Segismundo Casado's coup took place, putting an end to the Republican resistance and giving way to the victory of the rebel faction led by General Francisco Franco.

== Government's reaction to the military uprising of July 1936 ==
On the afternoon of Friday 17 July, it was already known in Madrid that a military uprising had begun in the Spanish protectorate in Morocco. Prime Minister Santiago Casares Quiroga issued the first orders to the Army, the Navy, and the civil governors to take action. The following day, the uprising spread to the peninsula. The workers' organizations (the CNT and the UGT) demanded armas para el pueblo (Note: English: Arms for the people) to put an end to it but the government refused, basically because, at that time, the left-wing Republicans feared:

(...) tanto o más que el golpe militar de signo antirrepublicano, el desbordamiento del orden social por obra de una acción de masas. (Note: English: (...) as much if not more than the military coup of an anti-Republican nature, a disruption of the social order due to mass actions.)

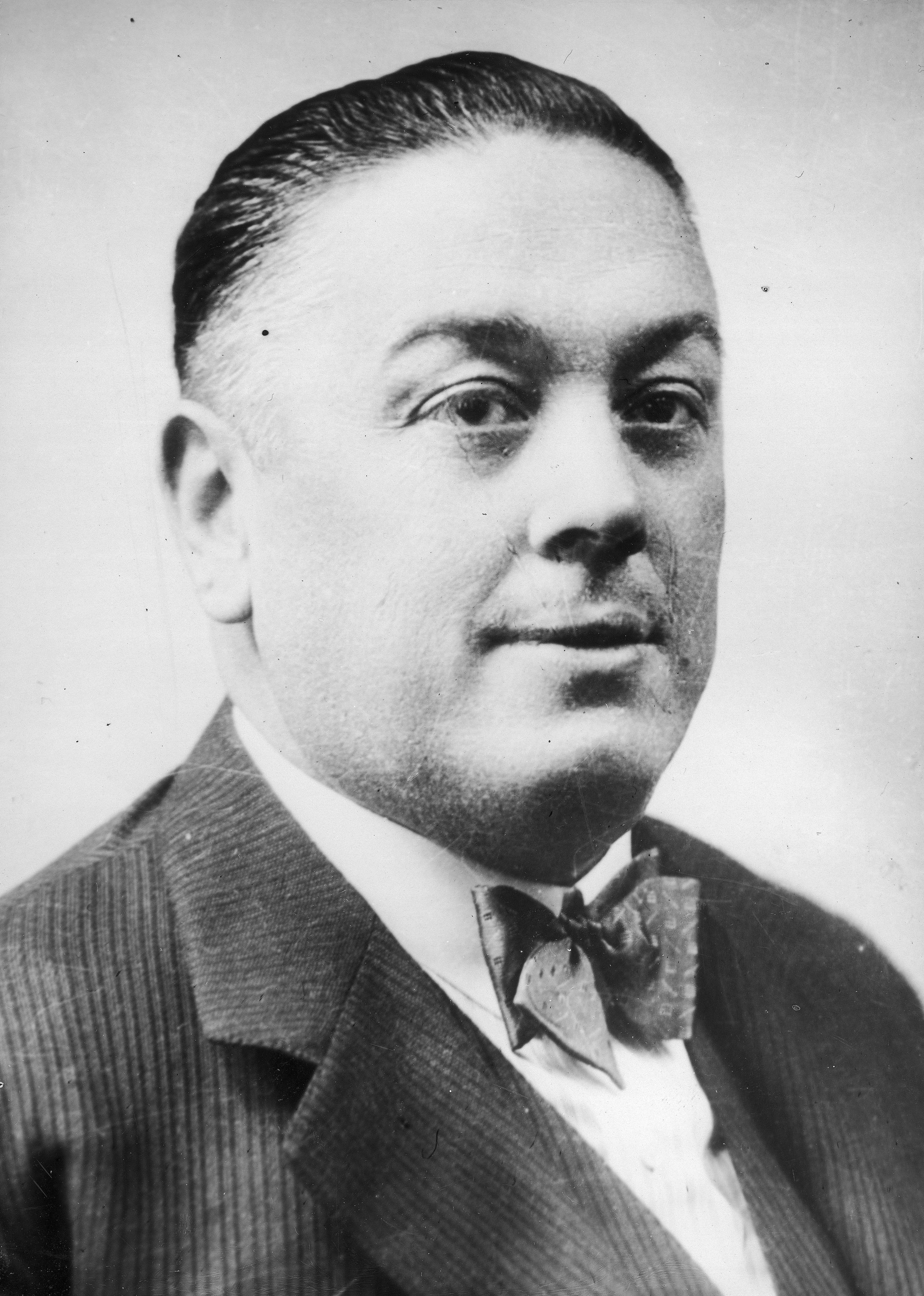
Diego Martínez Barrio

On the evening of that Saturday, 18 July, Casares Quiroga tendered his resignation to President Manuel Azaña. The latter commissioned Diego Martínez Barrio, president of the Cortes and leader of Republican Union, to form a government with the greatest possible political support, leaving out the two extremes (the CEDA and the Communist Party of Spain). The goal was to quash the rebellion without having to resort to the armed support of the workers' organizations. Martínez Barrio formed a government that, although it was not much different from the previous one (he did not manage to get the Socialists to take part), included moderate politicians willing to reach some kind of agreement with the rebel faction, such as Justino de Azcárate and Felipe Sánchez Román, the leader of the National Republican Party (PNR), who left the Popular Front coalition when the Communist Party became a part of it.

In the early morning of Sunday 19 July, Martínez Barrio spoke on the telephone with General Emilio Mola—known as El Director (Note: English: The Director) of the uprising—but the latter flatly refused to enter into any kind of negotiation, saying:

You have your followers and I have mine. If we were to seal a bargain, we should be betraying our ideals and our men.

According to the subsequent Francoist version, he even offered him a few state ministries for the rebels, but Martínez Barrio always denied this version of events. Therefore, the supposed negotiation with the rebels failed, and so the "reconciliation government" resigned late in the afternoon of Sunday 19 July. Azaña then appointed José Giral as the new prime minister. Giral was a fellow party member who formed a government made up solely of left-wing Republicans, although with the explicit support of the Socialists, and who made the decision to hand out arms to the workers' organizations. The latter was something that Martínez Barrio had also refused to do because he believed that this went beyond what was considered as a constitutional and "legal" defense of the Republic. Nonetheless, because of this decision, the Republican State lost its monopoly on violence and it was not able to prevent the start of a social revolution, since the workers' organizations did not take to the streets:

(...) exactamente para defender la República, a la que se le había pasado la oportunidad, sino para hacer la revolución. A donde no había llegado la República con sus reformas, llegarían ellos con la revolución. (...) Un golpe de estado contrarrevolucionario, que intentaba frenar la revolución, acabó finalmente desencadenándola. (Note: English: (...) precisely to defend the Republic, which had missed its opportunity, but to wage the revolution. Where the Republic had not managed to reach with its reforms, there they would reach with the revolution. (...) A counterrevolutionary coup that had attempted to quash the revolution ended up finally unleashing it.)

=== Controversy of handing out "arms to the people" ===
According to British historian Hugh Thomas (1961):

The constitutional means of opposing the rising thus met with failure (...) since the majority of the forces of so-called law and order—the Army and the Civil Guard—were with the rebels, who claimed to represent law and order themselves. The only force capable of resisting the rebels was that of the trade unions and left-wing parties. Yet for the Government to use this force would mean that it accepted the inevitability of a left-wing revolution. (...) Already in the towns where risings had taken place, in Morocco and in Andalusia, the opposition to them had been that of the revolutionary parties of the Left. (...) And the new Government immediately took the irrevocable step from which Casares, constitutional to the end, had shrunk. The people would be armed! As the sun was rising on July 19, lorries carrying rifles were driven fast along the streets of Madrid from the Ministry of War to the headquarters of the UGT and the CNT (...) And these orders to distribute what arms there were were given by telephone to all the Civil Governments in the provinces, although in many cases such orders were too late: for this occurred just when, in the summer dawn, the second wave of risings was about to break over Spain.

Meanwhile, for historian Julio Aróstegui (2006), the government's delay in giving arms to the workers' organizations was key to the success of the uprising in certain cities such as Seville, Granada, or Ávila. Aróstegui refers to aquella fatal duda (Note: English: That fatal doubt) of the governments of Casares Quiroga and Martínez Barrio as to whether or not to hand out the weapons:

(...) fue definitoria en la imposibilidad de cortar la sublevación en la raíz... En el momento decisivo estos políticos se negaron a apelar al pueblo... para la defensa armada de la República. Se negaron a entregar las armas de procedencia militar que las organizaciones del proletariado, partidos y sindicatos, reclamaban... e impidieron en muchos casos que los gobernadores civiles y otras autoridades subalternas se pusieran decididamente al frente de los movimientos defensivos populares. Hubo casos claros donde esta parálisis fue la mejor baza de los sublevados. (Note: English:(...) was decisive in the impossibility of nipping the uprising in the bud (...) At the turning point, these politicians refused to appeal to the people (...) for the armed defense of the Republic. They refused to hand out the weapons of military origin that the working class organizations, the parties, and the labor unions demanded (...) and in many cases they prevented the civil governors and other subordinate authorities from decisively putting themselves at the head of the popular defensive movements. There were clear cases in which this paralysis represented the greatest advantage for the rebels.)

On his part, historian Julián Casanova (2007) considers a myth the idea that "the people in arms" were the ones who defeated the rebels in the streets of the main Spanish cities:

Confidence in the rapid triumph of the rebellion evaporated when the rebels were defeated in the majority of large cities. An alliance between the security forces loyal to the Republic and activists of the political and union organisations played a fundamental role in the crushing of the rebellion in Barcelona, Madrid, Málaga, Valencia, Gijón and San Sebastián. Where, on the other hand, this alliance was not created (as in Seville and in Córdoba) or where the Civil and Assault Guards supported the rebels (Zaragoza and Valladolid, for example), the struggle was very one-sided and was quickly settled in favour of the rebel forces. The republican state maintained its legal existence, but the collapse of its mechanisms of coercion, resulting from the division provoked by the coup within the army and the security forces, destroyed its cohesion and left it teetering on the brink of collapse. Despite the myths forged around these events, it was not the people unassisted, 'the people in arms', who defeated the rebels in the streets of the most important cities. Nevertheless, having lost its monopoly of arms, the state could not prevent a sudden and violent outburst of revolution in those places where the rebels had been defeated.

Moreover, historian Francisco Alía Miranda (2018) agrees with Casanova, since according to him, the main cause of the success of the uprising in some provinces and the failure in others was the position taken by the senior military officers in each one rather than social or political factors, as in the cases of Madrid and Barcelona, where the rebellion failed porque los militares sublevados no contaron con apoyo suficiente por parte de sus compañeros. (Note: English: Because the military rebels did not have sufficient support from their comrades.) However, Alía Miranda adds that the response of the Republican authorities to the uprising was also important since each civil governor acted differently. Where they acted quickly, they managed to quash the rebellion (such as in Málaga, Huelva, Almería, Badajoz, Oviedo, Ciudad Real, Cuenca, and Jaén), while in those places where they hardly did anything, due to indecision or ignorance, the rebellion triumphed (as in Logroño, Cáceres, and Guipúzcoa).

== Social revolution of 1936 and the Giral government ==
According to Aróstegui (1997), many working-class citizens interpreted the military uprising more as a justification for radical social change than as the need to take up arms in a war. While for Casanova (2007), many workers and peasants believed that the time had come to realize the changes that would improve their living conditions, those changes that the reforms of the Republic had failed to achieve. Now it was possible to realize so many expectations that had been frustrated before. And therein lay one of the paradoxes of the situation in the summer of 1936: that the military coup that falsely claimed to want to quash a non-existent revolution was the one that "opened the doors to the revolution".

Aróstegui further adds that the military uprising was the one that created the conditions for revolutionary change to occur. Thus, he says, the rebellion was the response to the uprising and not the other way around, as the rebels and the subsequent regime always claimed afterwards.

=== Social revolution of 1936 ===
Coat of arms of the Regional Defence Council of Aragon, an institution that was created during the Spanish Revolution of 1936.

The handing out of arms to the workers' parties and organizations caused them to quickly constitute armed militias to confront the rebellion in the military sphere and to move forward with a profound social revolution. They ignored the Republican authorities, which they did not overthrow, and proceeded to seize and collectivize farms and industrial and commercial enterprises to ensure the continuity of the production and distribution of goods. They also took over the main state functions. Production, supply to the public, surveillance, repression, communications, transportation, and health, were all left in the hands of trade union committees, which in many locations abolished the currency and replaced it with vouchers. Faced with the collapse of the mechanisms of public authority, a new working class power emerged in the summer of 1936, at once military, political, social, and economic. As sociologist Santos Juliá (1999) says:

Un gobierno que reparte armas es un gobierno que se ha quedado sin instrumentos para garantizar el orden público e imponer su autoridad. (Note: English: A government that hands out arms is a government that has been left without instruments to ensure law and order and to impose its authority.)

Juliá further adds that the revolution thus came to be under the control of the labor unions. To collectivize an enterprise or a farm was tantamount to placing it under the control of committees formed by representatives of the CNT or the UGT or both.

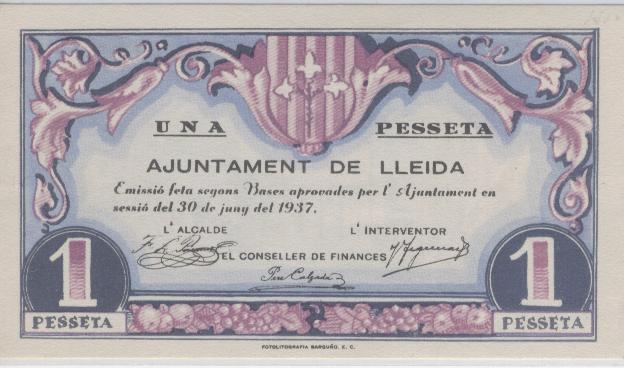
One peseta banknote issued in 1937 by the Lleida City Council.

The revolution had different consequences depending on the territory. In Catalonia, for instance, the CNT collectivized the industry while at least respecting land ownership and allowing a "bourgeois" government to remain in place at the Palau de la Generalitat de Catalunya. Meanwhile, in Aragón, the militias imposed collectivization against the will of small and medium landowners and installed an organ of political power, the Council of Aragon, outside the fold of Republican laws. Furthermore, in areas of New Castile, Valencia, and Andalusia, the peasant unions occupied the lands that had been abandoned by their owners. In contrast, there was no social revolution in the Basque Country, where the Basque Nationalist Party had rejected a coalition with the CEDA in the February 1936 elections and had backed the left in the process for the statute of autonomy. Instead, a Catholic and nationalist party remained in place until June 1937 at the head of an autonomous government with power over little more than the Biscay territory.

Furthermore, Juliá points out that the destruction of the State's authority and the proliferation of local union powers determined the fate of the revolution. On one hand, those committees were autonomous and thus incapable of centralizing resources, and on the other, they did not establish any limits to their actions. Such a fragmented, autonomous, and discretionary power, without any external control or enemy that could confront them in their own territory, is the reason why the Spanish Revolution of 1936 was one of the most socially profound of the 20th century.

The irony was that the revolution did not put an end to the Republican state but rather simply ignored it and rendered it ineffective. In Catalonia, where the workers' organizations—mainly the CNT—were in complete control of the situation, the Central Committee of Antifascist Militias of Catalonia was established, although the government of the Generalitat de Catalunya continued to be in office. Then in Valencia, the Popular Executive Committee made an appearance, while in Málaga and Lleida, Public Health Committees were established. Moreover, in Santander, Gijón, and Jaén there were provincial committees of the Popular Front. In Biscay, a Defense Board was established. Finally, in Madrid, a National Committee of the Popular Front was set up. It organized militias and ran the city, while the government of José Giral—made up of only leftist Republicans—continued to exist alongside it.

=== Government of José Giral (19 July – 3 September 1936) ===
Despite not having any real power, the Giral government continued to act, especially at an international level. This administration was the one that requested the sale of arms to the government of the French Popular Front, and when it did not obtain it, then it asked the Soviet Union, for which it used the gold reserves of the Bank of Spain. On the domestic front, it dismissed those officials it suspected of supporting the uprising and passed the first measures to try to control the "indiscriminate, arbitrary, and extrajudicial executions of fascists" carried out by dozens of "revolutionary courts"—also known as checas (Note: According to journalist Peter H. Wyden, the name checas—although he refers to them as chekas—came from the first Soviet political police created in Russia in 1917.)—set up by the workers' organizations and parties that had imposed the Red Terror in Madrid and elsewhere. Thus, immediately after the Cárcel Modelo massacre in Madrid, during which politicians and right-wingers were murdered by militias, the Giral government created special courts:

[P]ara juzgar los delitos de rebelión y sedición y los cometidos contra la seguridad del Estado por cualquier medio. (Note: English: To judge the crimes of rebellion and sedition and those perpetrated against the security of the State by any means.)

These courts would be made up of three judges, loyal to the Republic, and fourteen jurors appointed by the parties and workers' organizations that made up the Popular Front. However, these courts did not put an end to the activities of the checas, which continued to kill "fascists" via paseos (Note: English: Sacar a dar un paseo: lit. to take for a walk, to take for a ride; people who were detained illegally and killed immediately, and whose bodies were thrown in a ditch or next to the wall of a cemetery.) or sacas (Note: English: Saca from sacar: lit. to take out, to release, to free; the release from prison of detainees who were supposedly going to be set free, but who were put in front of a firing squad.)

Nevertheless, the government of Giral was only made up of left-wing Republicans, so it did not represent at all the forces that were carrying out the intense social, political, and military mobilization that had been launched by the uprising of July 1936. Therefore, on 3 September 1936, when the rebel Army of Africa took over the city of Talavera de la Reina, José Giral, lacking support and authority, submitted his resignation to President Manuel Azaña so that he could be replaced by a government that represented:

(...) todos y cada uno de los partidos políticos y organizaciones sindicales y obreras de reconocida influencia en la masa del pueblo español. (Note: English: (...) every one of the political parties, trade unions, and workers' organizations of recognized influence on the mass of the Spanish people.)

== Government of Largo Caballero (September 1936 – May 1937) ==
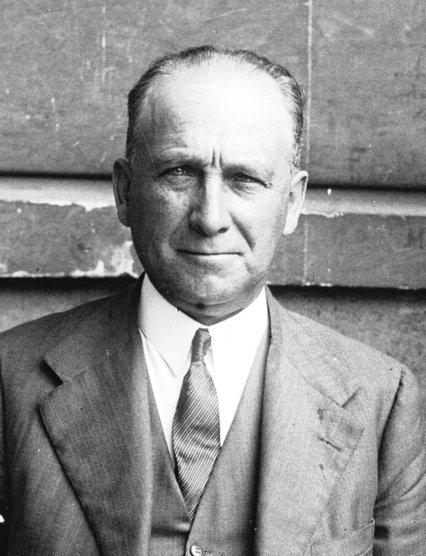
Francisco Largo Caballero

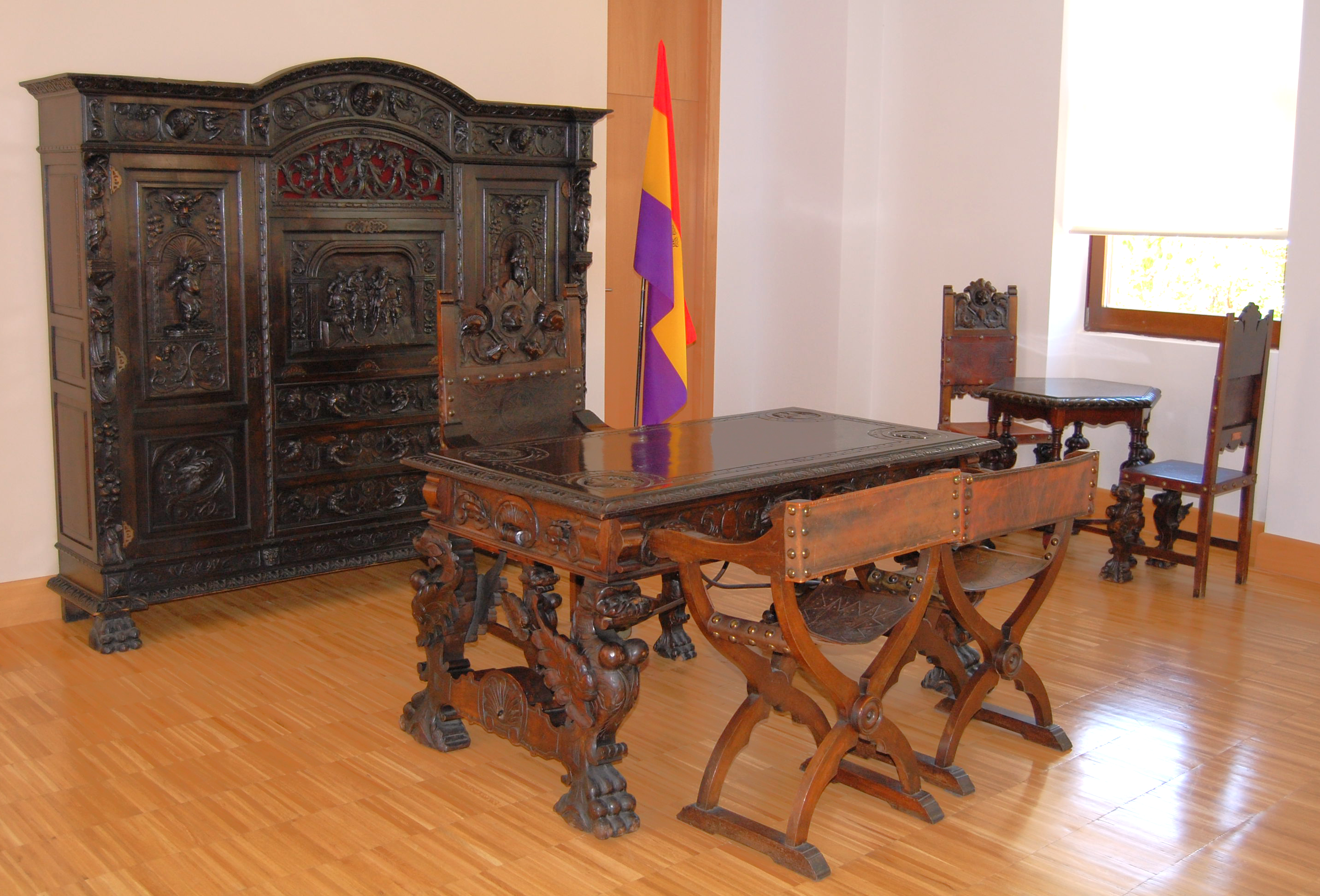
The office of Francisco Largo Caballero, preserved at the Archives of the Workers' Movement in Alcalá de Henares

After Giral's resignation, Manuel Azaña entrusted the formation of a "coalition government" to Francisco Largo Caballero, the socialist leader of the UGT, one of the two trade union confederations that were leading the revolution. Largo Caballero—who, in addition to serving as prime minister, also took on the leadership of the key Ministry of War—understood this government to be an "anti-fascist alliance" and thus welcomed into the cabinet the greatest possible number of representatives of the parties and unions fighting against the "fascist" rebellion (as the workers' organizations were calling the July military uprising). Therefore, the cabinet was made up of the following: two socialist largocaballeristas (Note: Supporters of Largo Caballero) (Ángel Galarza in the Ministry of the Interior and Anastasio de Gracia in Industry and Commerce); three socialist prietistas (Note: Supporters of Indalecio Prieto) (these were Indalecio Prieto himself in the Ministry of the Navy and Air Force, Julio Álvarez del Vayo in State, and Juan Negrín in Treasury); two communists (Jesús Hernández Tomás in Education and Vicente Uribe in Agriculture); four Republicans (Bernardo Giner de los Ríos in Communications, Julio Just Gimeno in Public Works, Mariano Ruiz-Funes in Justice, and José Giral, without portfolio); one from the Republican Left of Catalonia (José Tomás Piera, in Labor); and one from the Basque Nationalist Party (PNV) (Manuel de Irujo, without portfolio, who joined the administration a few days later). But this government was not complete until two months later. On 4 November (at the time when the rebel troops were already on the outskirts of Madrid), four CNT ministers joined in. Among them were the first female minister in Spain, Federica Montseny, in the Ministry of Health, along with Joan García Oliver, the new minister of justice (replacing Ruiz Funes), and Joan Peiró and Juan López Sánchez, who shared the Ministry of Industry and Commerce. The "anti-fascist unit" had thus been created. There was one exception, the anti-Stalinist communists of the Workers' Party of Marxist Unification (POUM), whose presence in the cabinet was vetoed by the PCE.

The new Largo Caballero administration, the self-proclaimed "government of victory", realized that the war had to be given priority. Hence, it immediately set in motion a political program that involved the creation of a new army and unification of the direction of the war. This started at the top by creating a General Staff, with its first directive being to organize the front into four theaters of operations: Central, Aragón, Andalusia, and Northern, thus rebuilding, at least on paper, the unity of the Republican army. This was followed by the militarization of the militias by creating the mixed brigades to incorporate them, as well as the corps of commissars; the nationalization of the war industries; the centralization and coordination of the economic activity; the defense of small and medium-sized properties; the containment of experiments in social revolution; and pacts of unity between parties and unions. Therefore, the trade union leaders of the CNT and the UGT, by accepting this program, agreed that the implementation of libertarian communism (sought by the former) or a socialist society (sought by the latter), should await the military victory.

But even with all these measures, the Republican Army did not manage to prevent the Army of Africa from advancing towards Madrid, only to slow it down. On 6 November, the latter was already about to enter the capital. On that day, the government, having held a meeting in which the four ministers of the CNT were in attendance for the first time, decided to leave Madrid and move to Valencia, entrusting the defense of the city to General José Miaja, who would establish the Madrid Defense Council. According to Casanova (2007), this was una salida precipitada, mantenida en sigilo, sobre la que no se dio explicación pública alguna. (Note: English: A hasty departure, kept secret, about which no public explanation was ever given.)

While Juliá (1999) adds:

Quienes se quedaron en Madrid no pudieron interpretar estos hechos sino como una vergonzosa huida... sobre todo porque los madrileños fueron capaces de organizar su defensa. Madrid resistió el primer embate y rechazó los siguientes, deteniendo así el avance del ejército rebelde. (Note: English: Those who remained in Madrid could only interpret these events as a shameful flight... especially because the people of Madrid were able to organize their defense. Madrid resisted the first onslaught and fought the following ones, thus halting the advance of the rebel army.)

However, some historians believe that Largo Caballero's decision, at an enormous political cost to him from which he did not recover (the myth of the Lenin español (Note: English: The Spanish Lenin) had begun to fade), must have been beneficial for the defense of the capital. On the other hand, such was the optimism of Franco's troops and his supporters that radio station Radio Lisbon even reported, hastily, on the fall of the city to the Nationalists. To the point of even narrating Franco's triumphal entry into Madrid riding on a white horse.

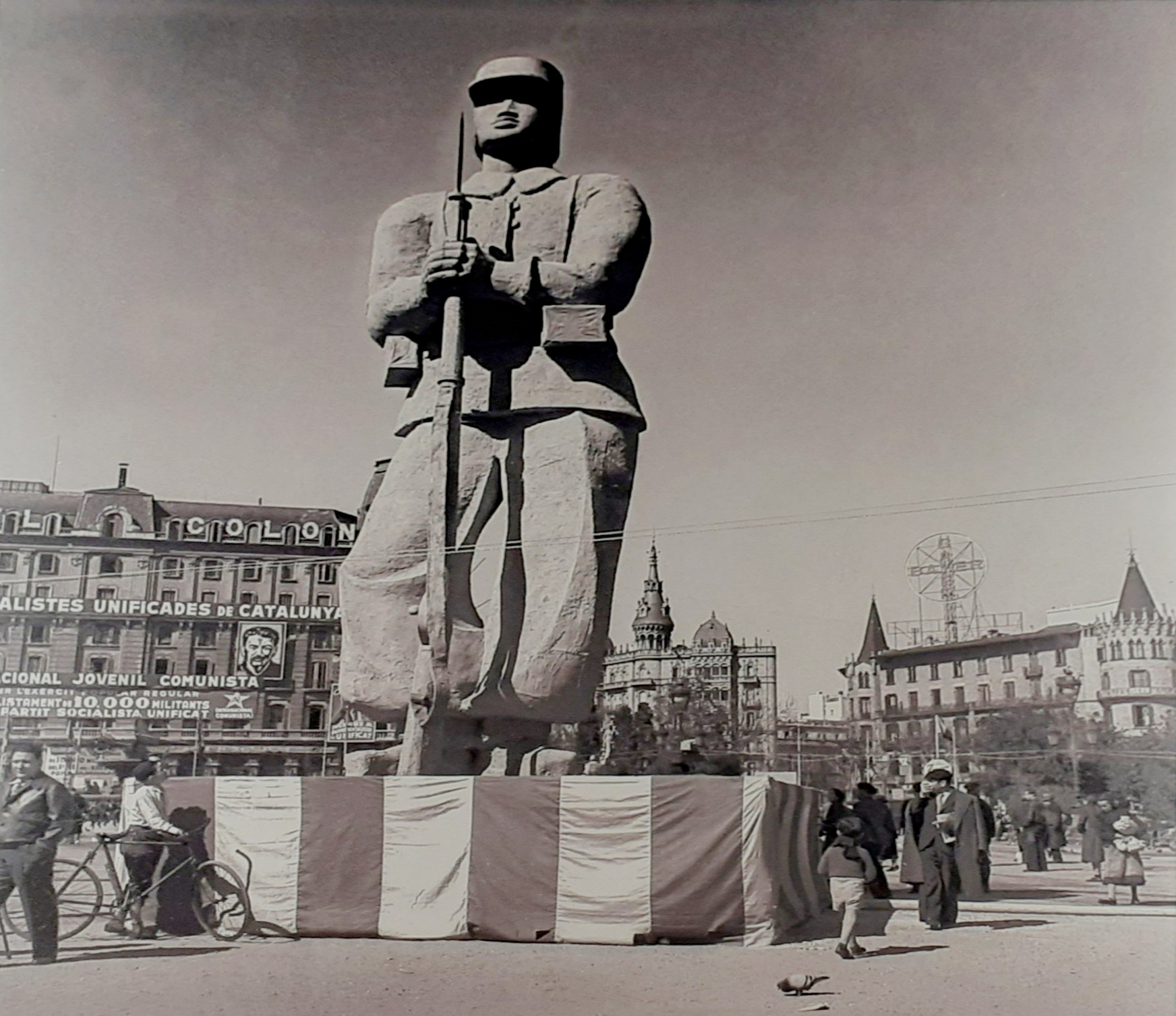
Sculpture erected in the Plaça de Catalunya in Barcelona in March 1937, to pay homage to the Soldat del Poble (the soldier of the Spanish Republican Army). Several artists, such as Josep Bartolí, worked on the sculpture.

The second major objective of the Largo Caballero administration was to re-establish the authority of the government and the State powers. A decree was enacted for this purpose, which placed all the defense committees and boards under the authority of Provincial Councils presided over by the civil governors, while the local revolutionary committees were replaced by municipal councils made up of all trade union organizations and anti-fascist parties.

But this did not solve the tensions with the governments of the autonomous regions of Catalonia and the Basque Country, nor with the regional councils that had sprung up elsewhere. In Catalonia, the government of the Generalitat—which had incorporated several consellers of the CNT and the POUM on 26 September, so that the Committee of Militias was dissolved—organized its own army and, on 24 October, approved the communities decree. Both of these issues went beyond the scope of its competences. As for the Basque Country, on 1 October the Cortes approved the Statute of Autonomy and Basque nationalist José Antonio Aguirre was sworn in as the lehendakari of the Basque government. The latter did not include any representative of the CNT (in the Basque Country, there had been no social revolution and hardly any anticlerical violence, and churches remained open). Aguirre built a "quasi-sovereign" state over the Basque territory that had not yet been occupied by the rebel faction and which was practically limited to Biscay. In addition to a Basque police force, the Ertzaina, he created his own army and did not accept the command of the general sent by the Madrid government to head the Northern Army. As for the Council of Aragon, the Largo Caballero administration had no choice but to legalize it, so that the eastern half of Aragón, which was within the Republican zone, had its own police force, carried out inspections, controlled the collectivized economy, and administered justice.

The success in the defense of Madrid favored the appearance of two new powers that would turn out to be decisive factors in the future of Largo Caballero's government: the new military senior officers who successfully directed the operations and managed to quash the attempts of the rebel army to take the capital, and the communists, strengthened by the shipments of armament from the Soviet Union and by the presence of the International Brigades, since, in addition, they were the strongest defenders of military order and discipline and of the great task of defending Madrid.

=== Events of May 1937 ===
In the spring of 1937, after Franco's decision to put an end, for the time being, to the siege of Madrid after the Republican victory in the battle of Guadalajara, the prospect of a prolonged war loomed in the horizon. Soon, a crisis broke out between the political forces supporting the Republic. The political problem within the alliance of caballeristas (Note: Supporters of Largo Caballero) started to become more noticeable in the period between November and May, on many different fronts. The attitude of the communists, who clearly sought their political and military prominence, and their insistence on reaching an alliance between them and the socialists—something that had already been achieved in Catalonia with the creation of the PSUC—along with the constant lack of discipline of the anarcho-syndicalists—who continued to act independently despite being part of the government—and the permanent rupture within socialism itself, between the moderate o prietista faction controlling the party's executive committee and the left or caballerista faction, they constitute the most relevant extremes leading to these dissensions. Caballero's proclivity to lean especially on the trade unionists, which led to talk of his plans to establish a trade union government, was another source of problems. The disgruntlement among all these forces and of all of them with Caballero became more pronounced from March onwards. The PCE began to harshly and publicly criticize the head of government: for his military policy, his opposition to the single command in the Army, the alleged disregard of the communist members of the military, and his inclination towards the trade unions.

The fundamental conflict was the one that confronted the anarchists of the CNT, joined by the anti-Stalinist communists of the POUM (described as "Trotskyists" by the communists of the PCE), who defended the compatibility of the revolution with the war, and the communists of the PCE and the PSUC in Catalonia, who understood that the best way to stop the military uprising was to unite all the forces of the political left, including the parties of the petite and middle bourgeoisie. And for this, the social revolution should be quashed and priority should be given to the war. However, Santos Juliá (1999) says—contrary to the opinion of other historians—that in the spring of 1937, among the forces supporting Largo Caballero's government la [línea] divisoria no corría entre guerra y revolución sino entre partidos y sindicatos (Note: English: The dividing line did not lie between the war and the revolution but rather between the parties and the trade unions) because the priority given to the war had already been decided on 4 September when that government was formed, which the four anarchist ministers joined two months later.

The crisis broke out because of the clashes that began in Barcelona on Monday 3 May 1937, when a detachment of the Security and Assault Corps, by order of the Generalitat de Catalunya, tried to regain control of the Telefónica building in the Plaça de Catalunya, held by the CNT since the coup of July 1936. Several anarchist groups responded with arms and the POUM joined in the fight. On the other side, the Generalitat and the communists and socialists unified in Catalonia under the same party (the PSUC) faced the rebellion, which they had provoked, and the fight lasted several days. Barcelona was filled with barricades, and with the wounded and the dead—1,000 and 400, respectively, according to official figures. The central government, with headquarters in Valencia, sent a first contingent to Barcelona of 2,000 assault guards (a number that would reach 5,000 in subsequent days) in response to the request for help made by President Manuel Azaña, who back then had his official headquarters at the Royal Palace of Pedralbes in Barcelona. A delegation headed by two of the four anarchist ministers, Joan García Oliver and Federica Montseny, and by the secretary of the CNT National Committee Mariano Rodríguez Vázquez, also left for Barcelona. As soon as they arrived, they appealed to their fellow party members to call for a cease-fire:

Camaradas, por la unidad antifascistas [sic], por la unidad proletaria, por los que cayeron en la lucha, no hagáis caso de las provocaciones. (Note: English: Comrades, for anti-fascist unity, for proletarian unity, for those who fell during the struggle, ignore provocations.)

On Friday 7 May, the forces of law and order sent from Valencia were able to control the situation, helped by PSUC militants, although the Generalitat paid the price of having its law enforcement powers withdrawn.

=== Fall of the Largo Caballero government and the designation of Negrín ===
The events of May 1937 in Barcelona had immediate repercussions on the government of Largo Caballero. The crisis was provoked on 13 May by the two communist ministers who threatened to resign if Largo Caballero did not vacate the Ministry of War (the PCE, especially, since the fall of Málaga on 8 February, held him responsible for the continuous Republican defeats), and dissolve the POUM. In this attack on Largo Caballero, they had the support of the socialist faction of Indalecio Prieto, who controlled the leadership of the PSOE which, like the communists, wanted to oust the trade union organizations—the UGT and the CNT—from the government and rebuild the Popular Front. For this purpose, the PSOE and the PCE established liaison committees on 15 April without at all considering the UGT. Largo Caballero refused to agree to the two conditions set by the communists and two days later, on 15 May, the CNT and the UGT made public their support to the president of government and proposed "a government supported by the workers' organizations." On 17 May, after not having found sufficient support for his administration, Largo Caballero submitted his resignation, and President Azaña, who also disagreed with the presence within the government of the two trade union confederations, appointed a prietista socialist, Juan Negrín, as the new prime minister. The following day, the CNT's mouthpiece, Solidaridad Obrera, published on its editorial page: Se ha constituido un gobierno contrarrevolucionario. (Note: English: A counterrevolutionary government has been established.)

The fact that the one appointed by Azaña was Negrín and not Indalecio Prieto—as almost everyone expected—has been the subject of debate. Today, it seems clear that the reason was not that Negrín was the "candidate of the communists" (as was long held), but that Prieto, the leader of the moderate sector of socialism, could not succeed the head of the opposing faction, while Negrín, although a friend and collaborator of Prieto, had no faction behind him. Likewise, Negrín had a good relationship with all the forces of the Popular Front, including the caballerista faction, and with the CNT. Moreover, he had experience in the international arena, which would be useful in the event of having to resort to the mediation of the European powers to put an end to the war. The latter is what Azaña, who was rather pessimistic about the Republic's chances of victory, apparently thought. Negrín's gifts as an organizer, which he had demonstrated at the head of the Ministry of Finance in the government of Largo Caballero, were another point in his favor. In any case, in the new government, Indalecio Prieto was the one who led the key ministry, that is, the Ministry of War, which was joined by the Ministry of the Navy and Air Force, giving way to the new Ministry of Defense.

== Governments of Juan Negrín (May 1937 – March 1939) ==
=== First government of Juan Negrín (May 1937 – April 1938) ===
The main objective of Negrín's government was to put an end to the "revolutionary stage" of the first ten months of the war. Therefore, the government no longer had the labor union nature of the previous one, presided over by Largo Caballero. Rather, it responded to the reconstruction of the Popular Front based on the two main parties at the time in Republican Spain: the Spanish Socialist Workers' Party (PSOE)—which had reassembled after having disappeared as a frontline force of caballerismo—and the Communist Party of Spain (PCE). The latter was very far from the limited rollout it had had before July 1936, having demonstrated an enormous organizational capability during the chaotic first few months of the war—its symbol having been the Fifth Regiment, cornerstone of the new Spanish Republican Army—and having defended a moderate policy within the orbit of the Popular Front. In addition, it had the prestige derived from the military aid that the Soviet Union was providing to the Republic. Likewise, with this government, the discourse on the war changed from a "revolutionary war" to a "national war" against the German and Italian invaders and their Spanish Francoist allies.

The new government was made up of three socialist ministers, who occupied essential positions—Negrín himself, Indalecio Prieto, and Julián Zugazagoitia—two left-wing republicans—one from the Basque Nationalist Party (PNV) and the other from Republican Left of Catalonia—and two communists. The trade unions UGT and CNT did not want to take part, although the possibility for their integration remained open. The key figure in the new government was Indalecio Prieto, as he had full responsibility for the conduct of the war by having been appointed head of the new Ministry of Defense. According to Santos Juliá (1999), behind this government was Manuel Azaña, who wanted:

(...) un gobierno capaz de defenderse en el interior y de no perder la guerra en el exterior. Con Largo Caballero, no había sido posible ni lo uno ni lo otro: en el interior continua cesión de terreno; en el exterior, descrédito de la República y farsa de la no intervención. Con Prieto a cargo de un Ministerio de Defensa unificado, sería posible defenderse; con Negrín en la presidencia, se podían abrigar esperanzas de no perder la guerra en el exterior. (Note: English: (...) a government capable of defending itself at home and of not losing the war abroad. Neither had been possible with Largo Caballero: continuously giving ground inside the country; while abroad, the disrepute of the Republic and the farce of non-intervention. With Prieto in charge of a unified Ministry of Defense, it would be possible to wage defense; with Negrín in the presidency, hopes of not losing the war abroad could be entertained.)

This influence by Azaña on the cabinet can also be seen in the presence of José Giral—a man who had the full confidence of the president—at the head of the Ministry of State, a very important portfolio given the internationalization of the Spanish civil war.

Thus, the policy of Negrín's government had two fundamental axes: to turn the Spanish Republican Army into an armed force capable of winning the war, or at least capable of achieving a "dignified" peace. For this, it was also necessary to consolidate the reconstruction of the Republican State, in all areas, which would also serve to project abroad the image of a democratic republic comparable to other European parliamentary regimes. And secondly, to change the policy of non-intervention of the United Kingdom and France, which until then had only served to strengthen the Francoist faction.

The great loser of this political line was trade unionism, both in the UGT and the CNT. According to Julio Aróstegui (1997), these:

(...) hacen sino perder posiciones y peso en la política republicana. La CNT entra en franca crisis y abandona también el gobierno de la Generalidad de Cataluña, mientras que en agosto [de 1937], en el Pleno de Valencia, se reforma la estructura misma del anarcosindicalismo desapareciendo de hecho la FAI y apareciendo el Movimiento Libertario. (...) El caso de UGT fue más complicado si cabe... [ya que] en el seno del sindicato se produce en el verano de 1937 una lucha entre caballeristas y amigos del gobierno que llega a la existencia de dos Comisiones Ejecutivas en el período octubre de 1937 y febrero de 1938. Escisión que acabó formalmente en esta última fecha pero con la salida de Caballero. (Note: English: (...) did nothing but lose positions and weight in Republican politics. The CNT went into a crisis and left the government of the Generalitat of Catalonia, while in August 1937, in the Valencia Plenum, the very structure of anarcho-syndicalism was reformed. Thus, the Iberian Anarchist Federation (FAI) disappeared while the Libertarian Movement was founded. (...) The case of the UGT was more complicated, if possible. In the summer of 1937, there was a struggle between the caballeristas and friends of the government that led to the existence of two Executive Committees in the period between October 1937 and February 1938. This split formally ended on the latter date with the departure of Caballero.)

The domestic policy of the Negrín administration, whose main objective was the reconstruction of the Army coupled with that of the Republican State, took shape in:

- The culmination of the formation of the Republican Army. Under the authority of Indalecio Prieto, a Central General Staff of the Armed Forces was established, headed by Colonel Vicente Rojo Lluch, who took charge of the expansion of the Army and the organization and execution of military operations.
- The continuation of the recovery by the central government of all powers, with the justification that the direction of the war demanded it. This policy was the most heavily criticized, since the government had no qualms in sending the 11th Division of communist commander Enrique Líster to dissolve the Council of Aragon, the last bastion of the CNT, and to arrest its leaders. On the other hand, the occupation of the Cantabrian coast by the rebels, which was completed in November 1937, put an end to the autonomous political bodies operating there, especially the Basque government. When added to the loss of law enforcement powers by the Generalitat de Catalunya after the events of May 1937, it is clear that in late 1937, the Republic had a more unified power.
- Law enforcement and security. With Julián Zugazagoitia in the Ministry of the Interior and Manuel Irujo in the Ministry of Justice, there was an attempt to re-establish the rule of law in the Republican zone, although they were unable to prevent the assassination of POUM leader Andreu Nin by Soviet agents and the persecution of the Trotskyists by the Spanish Communists. What they did achieve was for the trial of the POUM leaders to be carried out with minimum legal guarantees and for it not to end in the death of the defendants.
- Guarantees of small and medium-sized properties. The dissolution of the Council of Aragon put an end to collectivized property, restoring private ownership of the lands of small and medium-sized landowners who so wished.

As for international policy, at the express request of President Manuel Azaña, an attempt was made to change the policy of non-intervention of the United Kingdom and France for one of mediation in the conflict, so that they would put pressure on Germany and Italy and stop supporting the rebels, with the final goal of reaching a "negotiated peace". However, nothing was achieved on this end. It soon became clear that this plan was doomed to failure. When in mid-1937 even the Holy See wanted to mediate, General Franco—on the same day that British Foreign Minister Anthony Eden met with a representative of Pope Pius XI to discuss the matter—commissioned Cardinal Isidro Gomá y Tomás:

(...) la difusión de un escrito colectivo del episcopado [español] al mundo católico sobre la verdadera naturaleza de la guerra y la imposibilidad de que acabara de otra forma que no fuera la victoria total, la rendición incondicional del enemigo. Es lo que Gomá transmitió a Pizzardo [el enviado del Papa que se había entrevistado con Eden] en una entrevista en Lourdes: la guerra no podía terminar más que con la victoria sin condiciones de la España nacional y católica. (Note: English: (...) to circulate a collective letter from the [Spanish] episcopacy to the Catholic world on the true nature of the war and the impossibility of its ending in any other way than total victory, the unconditional surrender of the enemy. This is what Gomá communicated to Pizzardo [the Pope's envoy who had met with Eden] during a meeting in Lourdes: the war could only end with the unconditional victory of a Nationalist and Catholic Spain.)

Those who were most strengthened by this were the communists—hence the accusation against Negrín of being a "crypto-communist". They set for themselves the goal of "openly fighting for hegemony in the government and in the country", as acknowledged by a representative of Communist International. To this end, they sought the unification of socialists and communists in a single party (as had already happened in Catalonia) following "Marxist-Leninist [i.e., Stalinist] principles." The PSOE, with Prieto in the lead, also openly opposed these aspirations. Moreover, the latter tried to put an end to the communist influence on the Republican Army by reducing the attributions of the political commissariat vis-à-vis the commanders and prohibiting political proselytizing.

=== March–April 1938 crisis: negrinistas versus anti-negrinistas ===
All the efforts made by the new government to provide the Republic with a real Army had to reflect on the battlefield. After the defeat of the War in the North (March–October 1937), the litmus test was going to be the Battle of Teruel, which began on 21 December 1937. The reorganized Republican Army had, for the first time, the opportunity to take a provincial capital from Franco's troops, to have a successful outcome of strategic and symbolic value. It was a matter of healing the wounds caused by the loss of the North and demonstrating the offensive capacity of the Republican Army, which had been slowly taking shape and perfecting itself throughout 1937. A victory in Teruel, in addition to its military value, would bring an obvious symbolic capital with unquestionable repercussions for a rearguard whose morale was shaken by the chain of defeats of the previous months. Apart from presenting to the international public opinion a different vision of a Republic with the capacity for military rejoinders that would transcend the merely defensive action. On his part, General Franco accepted the challenge and postponed his planned offensive on Madrid, because he was not willing to accept the slightest setback: he had to demonstrate to the adversary its permanent inferiority, apart from the fact that a defeat could put his absolute authority in question. The nationalists managed to take back the city of Teruel on 22 February 1938, after two months of heavy fighting, and thus the Battle of Teruel was a new setback for the Republicans in emotional, political, and military terms. The news of the defeat fell like a ton of bricks on the morale of the rearguard. Colonel Vicente Rojo Lluch admitted that it would still take a long time to provide the Republic with an army capable of facing the one on the rebel side.

But after the defeat of the Battle of Teruel, an even greater setback took place. The following month, the Aragon Front collapsed due to the thrust of the Aragon Offensive launched by Franco, which culminated with the arrival of the rebel army in the Mediterranean through Vinaròs on 15 April, thus dividing in two the territory that was loyal to the Republic. The perception that spread through Barcelona—the new seat of government since its transfer from Valencia in November 1937—was that of a real debacle. In a climate of general disarray, Barcelona was heavily bombed. Added to this was the confirmation of the policy of appeasement towards Germany by the United Kingdom and France. After Anthony Eden, who was in favor of not making any more concessions to Hitler, left the Foreign Office on 20 February 1938, the British Conservative government reached an agreement with Mussolini that allowed the presence of Italian forces in Spain in exchange for Italy's commitment that it would not seize any Spanish territory or island after the foreseeable victory of the rebel side. The only positive news was the reopening of the French border after the formation of the second and short-lived government of Léon Blum, from 13 March to 8 April. As soon as the Francoist offensive in Aragon began on 10 March, President Negrín made a secret trip to Paris where he met with prominent French pro-Republican figures such as Blum, Édouard Daladier, and Vincent Auriol to ask them for France's direct intervention in the war in Spain by sending five divisions. He argued that if the offensive was not stopped, France would have the Italians and the Germans on its border south of the Pyrenees, and nothing would prevent Mussolini and Hitler from practically penetrating French territory. Negrín returned to Spain on 15 March without having achieved anything concrete. Meanwhile, the Republican ambassador in London, Pablo de Azcárate, who had gone to Paris on orders by Negrín, remained in charge of the conversations.

The military defeats and the worsening of the international environment unleashed political tensions between the various forces that supported the Republic, leading to the crisis of March–April 1938, the second major internal crisis of the Republican faction, almost a year after the first one (the events of May 1937). The precarious consensus on which the first Negrín cabinet of May 1937 had settled was thus broken, giving way to the confrontation between negrinismo, or the party of resistance, and anti-negrinismo, or the party of peace.

The latter was headed by Azaña himself, supported by the Republican Left and the Republican Union, plus the Catalan and Basque nationalists, and by Indalecio Prieto at the head of a faction of the PSOE. Both believed that the military disasters of the Battle of Teruel and the Aragon Offensive showed that the Republican Army could never win the war and that a surrender had to be negotiated with support from France and the United Kingdom. Faced with them, Negrín and the PSOE faction that supported him, along with the communists, were firm supporters of continuing to resist under the battle call resistir es vencer. (Note: English: To resist is to win) The PCE and the PSUC called for a large demonstration in favor of continuing the war on 16 March 1938—one day after Negrín's return from his secret trip to Paris to ask for help from the French—in front of the Royal Palace of Pedralbes in Barcelona while Azaña was presiding over a government meeting. For Negrín, the alternative of negotiating with the enemy for the end of the war almost certainly meant the annihilation of the Republic. Therefore, the only possible way out was to resist prolonging this war while waiting for another to be unleashed in Europe on a continental scale, which would force France and the United Kingdom to come to the aid of the Republic.

The crisis began when Negrín tried to get Prieto to change ministries—after having stated his conviction that the war was lost, Prieto was the worst possible minister of defense—but Azaña backed the latter, as did the rest of the left-wing Republicans and the nationalists from Republican Left of Catalonia and the Basque Nationalist Party. However, the latter did not manage to articulate any alternative to Negrín, and he ended up emerging from the crisis with renewed strength and with the consequent departure of Prieto from the government. From that moment on, Republican Spain was divided into two tendencies separated by deep chasms of distrust, suspicion, and mutual condemnation. On one side, the party of resistance or negrinismo; on the other, the party of peace or anti-negrinismo, at the head of which were the president of the Republic, Prieto, Marcelino Domingo, and Julián Besteiro. According to Bahamonde Magro and Cervera Gil (1999):

Se ha hablado de que le faltó decisión [al presidente Azaña para retirarle la confianza a Negrín, lo que le hubiera obligado a presentar la dimisión]. Pero ¿qué personalidad republicana del partido de la paz estaba dispuesta a aceptar un nombramiento y una responsabilidad para una acción de gobierno en cuyo horizonte las posibilidades de mediación pactada eran remotas, y más que nada resultaba visible la rendición incondicional, la liquidación de la guerra? (Note: English: It has been said that [President Azaña] lacked the determination [to give Negrín a vote of no confidence, which would have forced him to resign]. But which Republican figure from the party of peace was willing to accept an appointment and a responsibility for government action with remote possibilities of agreed mediation and, more than anything, when an unconditional surrender and the end of the war were looming?)

=== Second Negrín government of "National Union" (April 1938 – March 1939) ===
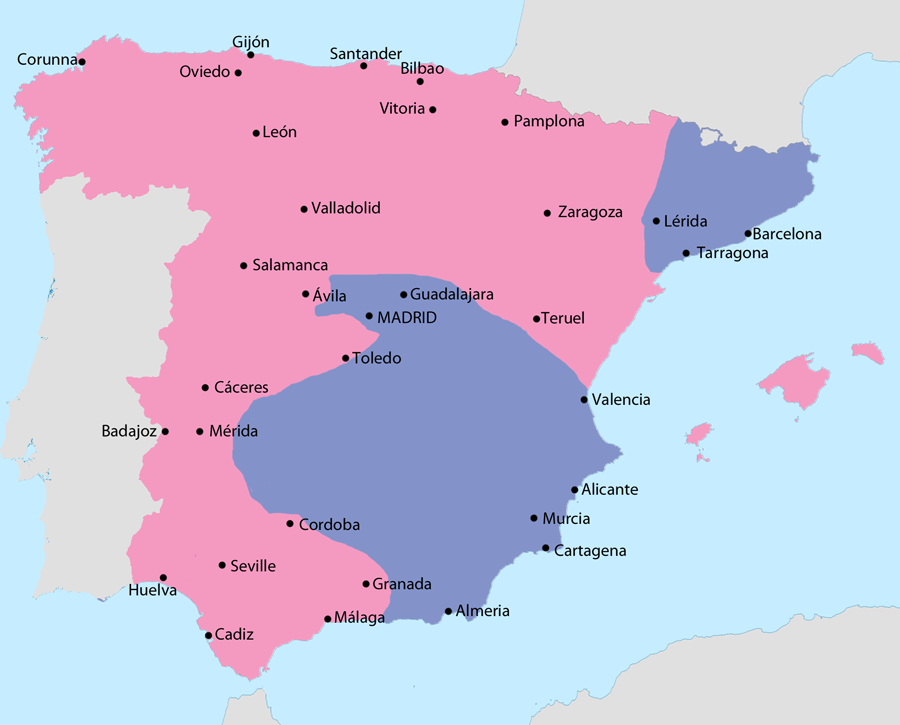
Map of the Spanish Civil War in July 1938

On 6 April, Negrín rebuilt the government and took on the role of minister of defense, while Francisco Méndez Aspe replaced him as head of the Ministry of Finance. He integrated the two trade unions in the cabinet: the UGT (with Ramón González Peña in Justice) and the CNT (with Segundo Blanco in Public Education). This meant that the PCE was left with only one minister (Vicente Uribe in Agriculture) and that Manuel de Irujo, from the PNV, was left as minister without portfolio, as was José Giral, replaced at the Ministry of State by Socialist Julio Álvarez del Vayo. Jaume Aiguader and Bernardo Giner de los Ríos continued in Labor and Communications, respectively. The most noteworthy aspects of the new government were the dismissal of Prieto, who ended up heading the "anti-negrinista" faction of a fractured PSOE; the departure of Giral from the Ministry of State—replaced by Álvarez del Vayo, a "negrinista" socialist—although he remained in the government in a minor role as minister without portfolio, as did Irujo; and the integration of two trade unionists, which was a debatable expansion, given the discussion that arose at the CNT and the UGT about the participation in the government of their two theoretical representatives.

This government had to gradually adapt to the progressive military collapse of the Republic, abandonment by the international community, the weariness of the population, and the progressive rupture of political unity in the face of the uprising. There is, however, one of Negrin's policies that remained as a goal and as the only alternative: the continuation of the war until the end, on the assumption that it was not possible to obtain from the enemy—that is, from Franco—a true peace negotiation, with conditions other than surrender.

On 21 April, only a week after the Republican zone had been split in two after the arrival of the Nationalists in the Mediterranean through Vinaròs, Juan Negrín communicated his will to resist to the military attaché from the French Embassy, who in turn communicated it to his government:

Yo estoy tan seguro de mi causa, de mí, que las derrotas militares no las creo nunca decisivas. Yo me batiré en Barcelona, me batiré en Figueras. En tanto que yo luche, no seré vencido. (...) Frente a Hitler, frente a Mussolini, no tengo nada. Un mal ejército. Pero digo "NO". Se me dice que estoy vencido: digo "NO"... Ya hace cerca de dos años que nosotros somos siempre vencidos: estas derrotas, a menudo son vergonzosas, usted lo sabe... Pero la Victoria es un asunto de voluntad. (...) Seremos todavía vencidos: habrá huidas, hundimientos. En tanto yo esté aquí con mis camaradas nosotros nos mantendremos. (Note: English: I am so sure of my cause, of myself, that I never believe military defeats to be decisive. I will fight in Barcelona, I will fight in Figueres. As long as I fight, I will not be defeated (...) Against Hitler, against Mussolini, I have nothing. A bad army. But I say "NO". I am told that I am defeated: I say "NO"... We have been defeated for almost two years: these defeats are often shameful, you know that... But Victory is a matter of will. (...) We will be defeated still: there will be flights, collapses. As long as I am here with my comrades, we will hold on.)

The positions of the new government with a view to potential peace negotiations, and as the pillars of a future new Republic, were set out in a 13-Point Declaration made public on 1 May, a date of major significance. In it, the government announced that its war objectives consisted of guaranteeing Spain's independence and establishing a democratic Republic with a legal and social structure approved via a referendum; it expressed its respect for legitimately acquired property, the need for agrarian reform and advanced social legislation; and announced a broad amnesty for all Spaniards who wished to cooperate in the immense work of reconstruction of the country. In his attempt to make it seem to foreign powers that he had the internal situation under control, Negrín began negotiations with the Holy See—that turned out to be unsuccessful—to reestablish diplomatic relations and open the churches to worship.

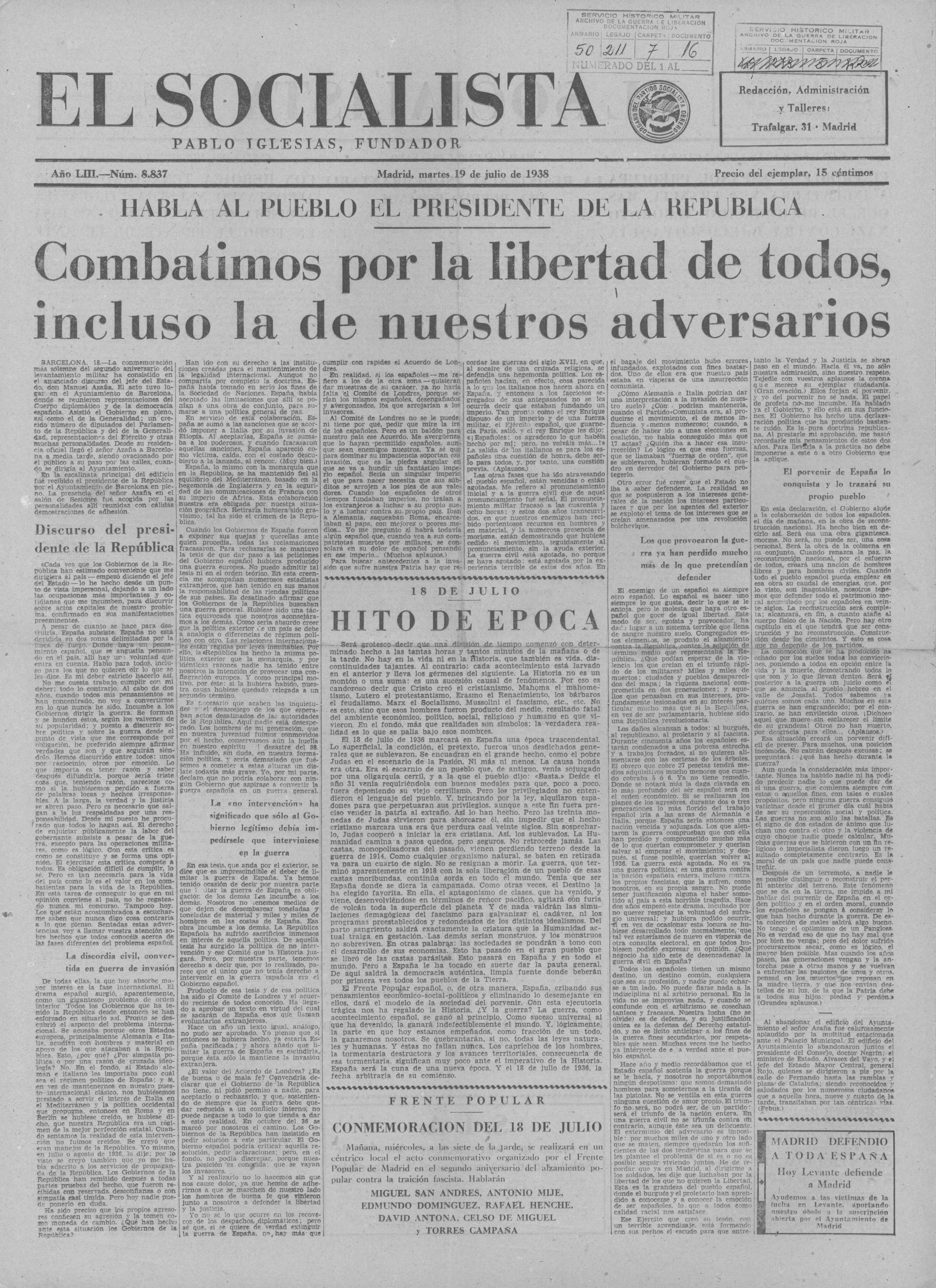
First page of El Socialista from 18 July 1938

Negrín was aware that the survival of the Republic depended not only on strengthening the Republican Army and maintaining the will of the civilian population to resist in the rearguard but also on France and the United Kingdom putting an end to the policy of non-intervention or at least putting pressure on the fascist powers so that they, in turn, would convince Franco to agree to a negotiated end. Negrín believed that his policy was the only one viable. Thus, his idea was to resist to negotiate an armistice that would avoid the "reign of terror and bloody vengeance"—that is, retaliation and executions by the victors against the vanquished—that Negrín was convinced Franco was going to impose, as indeed ended up happening. But Franco, who was kept informed by the agents of the Military Police and Information Service (SIPM) about the Republicans' rift, of the difficult situation in the rearguard due to the shortage of food, and of the difficulties of the Republican Army to obtain supplies, only accepted an unconditional surrender by the Republicans—which left the anti-negrinistas without arguments—and was not willing to admit mediation by the United Kingdom and France, to which, on the other hand, he had guaranteed that he would remain neutral in the event of a war in Europe. According to Bahamonde Magro and Cervera Gil (1999):

Al mantenimiento de esta política de destrucción de los republicanos colaboraba activamente el deseo de Franco de consolidar, más si cabe todavía, su poder personal. El ya caudillo reforzaría su posición con una victoria aplastante y sin ninguna clase de concesiones. Era la forma más operativa de acallar cualquier disidencia en su zona, y de evitar en el futuro que tomar fuerza toda alternativa -por ejemplo, el restablecimiento de la monarquía- contraria a la dictadura personal del general. (Note: English: Maintaining this policy of destruction of the Republicans was actively assisted by Franco's desire to consolidate, even more, if possible, his power. The caudillo would reinforce his position with an overwhelming victory and without any kind of concessions. It was the most efficient way to silence any dissidence in his area and to avoid in the future that any alternative—for example, the reestablishment of the monarchy—contrary to the general's dictatorship would gain strength.)

Besides, Negrín, General Vicente Rojo Lluch, and the communists believed that the Republican Army was still capable of one last offensive, which began on 24 July 1938, thus kickstarting the Battle of the Ebro, the longest and most decisive of the Civil War. The Ebro Army was made up of the best units of the Republican Army commanded mostly by communist veterans of the Siege of Madrid and provided with the best possible equipment, thanks to acquisitions made abroad during the three months in which the French border had been open (from April to June 1938). According to Bahamonde Magro and Cervera Gil (1999): El Ejército del Ebro era el emblema del resistir es vencer negrinista. (Note: English: The Ebro Army was the symbol of the negrinista slogan "To resist is to win.") The ultimate goal of the Ebro offensive was to reunite the two republican zones, which Negrín considered necessary to underpin his policy of resistance and deal a blow of effect of international repercussions at a time when Europe was going through the Sudeten crisis. This was the understanding of a French military observer based on the report he sent to Paris on 30 July, regarding the early days of the Ebro offensive he had been witness to:

(...) la resistencia en Levante, la maniobra audaz del cruce del Ebro son testimonio que no se pueden pasar por alto de este movimiento de enderezamiento nacional. (...) Esta España, que ha escapado a la anarquía, no es comunista. No es una milicia, sino un ejército. (...) Nosotros no hemos tomado partido en el conflicto pero tengo que constatar que esta España no quiere morir, que no va a morir, que tiene sus oportunidades (...) (Note: English: (...) the resistance in Levante, the bold maneuver of the Ebro crossing, are signs that cannot be overlooked of this movement of national straightening. (...) This Spain, which has escaped anarchy, is not communist. It is not a militia, but an army (...) We have not taken sides in the conflict, but I have to state that this Spain does not want to die, that it is not going to die, that it has its chances (...))

On his part, Franco accepted the challenge, as in other occasions, with the goal being that the enemy would exhaust its best resources in the fight, which indeed happened. Only two weeks after the Battle of the Ebro had started, the August crisis broke out in the Negrín administration. On 11 August 1938, the two Catalan and Basque nationalist ministers (Jaume Aiguader of Republican Left of Catalonia and Manuel de Irujo of the PNV) resigned because of their opposition to the creation of the Directorate General of Industries, linked to the Minister of Defense (that is, to Negrín himself), which meant that the Generalitat de Catalunya lost its powers over them, since they were militarized. The crisis was ultimately resolved by Negrín replacing them with a Catalan and a Basque, respectively: Aiguader by communist José Moix Regàs of the PSUC, and Irujo by Tomás Bilbao of Basque Nationalist Action. Both were fervent supporters of the negrinista slogan "To resist is to win," with which the president strengthened even more his position within the government.

After three months of heavy fighting, the Republican offensive of the Ebro ended in a new failure. On 16 November 1938, the Republican army had to return to its initial positions, with tens of thousands of casualties and a considerable loss of war material that could no longer be used to defend Catalonia against the Francoist offensive.

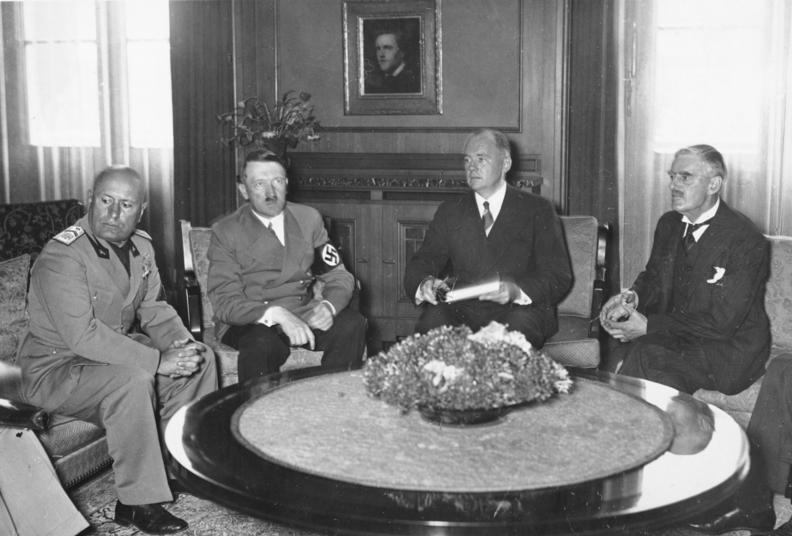
The four signatories of the Munich Agreement of 30 September 1938: Benito Mussolini, Adolf Hitler, Édouard Daladier, and Neville Chamberlain.

Shortly before the Battle of the Ebro ended, another event took place that was also decisive for the defeat of the Republic, this time coming from abroad. On 29 September 1938, the Munich Agreement was signed between the United Kingdom and France, on one hand, and Germany and Italy, on the other, which put an end to the possibility of war breaking out in Europe and the democratic powers intervening in favor of the Republic. Likewise, in the same manner that the agreement meant the surrender of Czechoslovakia to Hitler, it also meant abandoning the Spanish Republic to the allies of the Nazis and Fascists. It was of no use that, in a last desperate attempt to obtain foreign mediation, Negrín announced before the League of Nations on 21 September—a week before the signing of the Munich Agreement—the unilateral withdrawal of foreign combatants fighting in Republican Spain, thus agreeing without waiting for the nationalists to do the same with the resolution by the Non-Intervention Committee of 5 July 1938, which had been approved after six months of discussion and proposed a plan for the withdrawal of foreign volunteers from the war in Spain. On 15 November 1938, the day before the end of the Battle of the Ebro, the International Brigades held a farewell parade along the Avinguda Diagonal avenue in Barcelona. Meanwhile, in October 1938, the rebel faction, already sure of its military superiority and that victory was near, decided to reduce the Italian forces by a quarter. According to Bahamonde Magro and Cervera Gil (1999):

Es verdad que España estuvo «invadida» de presencia extranjera en los dos bandos, pero fue más la que se observó del lado del gobierno de Burgos y, sobre todo, ésta persistió hasta el final. Y es indudable que el argumento que esgrimía Negrín de que el bando nacional no era español, sin ser ni mucho menos verdad, tenía mucha más razón de ser que cuando Burgos afirmaba que la España republicana era prácticamente un satélite de Stalin. (Note: English: It is true that Spain was "invaded" by foreign presence on both sides, but it was observed more on the side of the Burgos government and, above all, this persisted until the end. And there is no doubt that the argument put forward by Negrín that the nationalist faction was not Spanish, although it was far from being true, was much more justified than when Burgos claimed that Republican Spain was practically a satellite of Stalin. The city of Burgos was the headquarters of the Francoist regime (1936–1939) following the start of the Spanish Civil War.)

With the signing of the Munich Agreement, Negrín's European hope to save the Republic vanished: there would be no war in Europe and once again the democratic powers had yielded to the fascist powers. This led Negrín to a dead end: either to continue resisting while waiting for the definitive outbreak of war in Europe—in the now more distant future—or to surrender, which would almost certainly result in reprisals from Franco. Besides, the Munich Agreement together with the failure of the Ebro offensive spread discouragement and defeatism in the Republican rearguard, breaking the will of resistance of the Popular Front. Very few, if not no one, had any faith in a Republican victory. On the other hand, the material losses of the Battle of the Ebro had been so great that it would be almost impossible to defend Catalonia against the foreseeable offensive of the Francoist army. Being aware of this, President Negrín sent Ignacio Hidalgo de Cisneros, commander of the Republican Air Force, to Moscow on 11 November 1938 with a handwritten and personal letter from Negrín himself to be delivered to Stalin, in which he requested immediate military aid for the Republic. The Soviet dictator agreed to send seven ships with a large amount of armament, but only two arrived in Bordeaux with enough time to be used in the campaign of Catalonia. In the end, this armament could not be used due to impediments by the French authorities for it to cross their territory and the rapid collapse of the front to the Francoist offensive.

The Catalonia Offensive ended in a new disaster for the Republic. The nationalist army launched its offensive on 23 December 1938 from the west and south on a Republican Army that was far inferior in terms of men and means—the Ebro Army was very weakened and the Republic had virtually no air forces—and was retreating. In January, fleeing from the bombings and fearful of reprisals, large numbers of the civilian population began to cross over to France. On 26 January 1939, the Francoist troops entered Barcelona practically without a fight. On 5 February, they occupied Girona. One year later, from exile, General Vicente Rojo Lluch compared what had happened in Madrid in November 1936 with what happened in Barcelona in January 1939:

¡Qué ambiente tan distinto! ¡Qué entusiasmo entonces! ¡Y qué decaimiento ahora! Barcelona cuarenta y ocho horas antes de la entrada del enemigo era una ciudad muerta... [Se] perdió lisa y llanamente porque no hubo voluntad de resistencia, ni en la población civil, ni en algunas tropas contaminadas por el ambiente... (Note: English: What a different atmosphere! What enthusiasm then! And what discouragement now! Forty-eight hours before the enemy entered, Barcelona was a dead town.... It was lost simply because there was no will to resist, neither in the civilian population nor in some troops tainted by the atmosphere...)

On 3 February, a representative of the French government had arrived in Burgos to prepare the official recognition of Franco's government by France and the United Kingdom, thus completing their abandonment of the Republic because, as Lord Halifax said during the 8 February meeting of the British cabinet, "it was clear that Franco was going to win the war" and so it was necessary to deal with him directly. Around the same time, the only intervention by the United Kingdom in the Spanish war happened in the occupation of the island of Menorca by the nationalists. To prevent the strategic island of Menorca—which had remained under Republican control throughout the war—from falling to the Italians or Germans, the British government agreed to the proposal by Fernando Sartorius, Count of San Luis, who was the Francoist head of the Balearic Islands Aerial Region, to have a Royal Navy ship to take him to Mahón and, from there, negotiate the surrender of the island in exchange for the Republican civilian and military authorities being able to leave it under British protection. The British government set the operation in motion without informing the Republican ambassador in London, Pablo de Azcárate. The latter, when he found out later, lodged a formal complaint for having lent a British ship to an "emissary of the Spanish rebel authorities." Thus, on the morning of 7 February, the heavy cruiser HMS Devonshire arrived at the port of Mahón with the Count of San Luis on board, where he met with Republican Governor Luis González de Ubieta. The following day, after having tried unsuccessfully to contact Negrín, the latter agreed to the conditions of surrender. At 5 in the morning on 9 February, the HMS Devonshire left Mahón headed for Marseille with 452 refugees on board. Menorca was immediately occupied by the nationalists without the participation of any Italian or German contingent. The British intervention gave rise to a heated debate in the House of Commons on 13 February, during which the Labour opposition accused Chamberlain's conservative government of having compromised the United Kingdom in Franco's favor. The following day, General Franco's unofficial representative in London, the Duke of Alba, conveyed to Foreign Secretary Lord Halifax "the gratitude of the Generalíssimo and the national government" for his collaboration in "reconquering Menorca."

Four days before the fall of Girona, on 1 February 1939 and during sessions held in Sant Ferran Castle, in Figueres, by what was left of the members of Congress (64 deputies), Negrín reduced his 13 Points to three guarantees that his government submitted to the democratic powers as conditions for peace: independence of Spain, for the Spanish people to point out what would be their regime and their fate, and for all persecution and retaliations to cease in the name of una labor patriótica de reconciliación. (Note: English: A patriotic work of reconciliation) A few days later, he let the French and British ambassadors know that he was ready to order an immediate cessation of hostilities if his government obtained guarantees that there would be no reprisals. But he did not receive these guarantees. Franco's intransigence was directly related to the military culture with which he conducted the war at all times, tending towards the destruction of the adversary. At the same time, Azaña also met with the ambassadors of France and the United Kingdom to express his opinion against Negrín and asked their governments to intercede with Franco so that he would provide guarantees to allow compromised persons to leave Spain, a single condition for the end of hostilities that ignored the three that had been approved by the Republican Cortes at the meeting in Figueres. When Negrín learned of this initiative by Azaña, which went beyond his constitutional powers, he completely disallowed it.

Negrín had previously held a meeting with the main Army commanders in Agullana, near the French border, in which they expressed their opinion that the war was lost. On 6 February, the main Republican authorities, headed by President Azaña, crossed the border followed by a large exodus of Republican civilians and members of the military who were going into exile. Then, on 9 February, Negrín did the same, but he took a plane in Toulouse to return to Alicante the next day, accompanied by some ministers to reactivate the war in the central-south region. The last Republican troops crossed the border on 11 February. The march to the central-south region was decided during a hasty meeting of the Council of Ministers in the Spanish consulate in Toulouse. Most of them were not willing to return, as morale was extremely low. However, none of them dared to say no. According to Viñas and Hernández Sánchez (2010):

París se había negado a proporcionar apoyo. Negrín y Álvarez del Vayo utilizaron para su viaje [de regreso a España] el servicio regular aéreo y compraron sus billetes como simples pasajeros. (Note: English: Paris had refused to provide support. Negrín and Álvarez del Vayo used the regular air service for their trip [back to Spain] and bought their tickets as common passengers.)

On the other hand, Negrín had tried to convince Azaña to also return to the central-south region, but the latter flatly refused, claiming that the war was lost. Nonetheless, Negrín at least managed to get Azaña to stay at the Spanish embassy in Paris, which in terms of international law was Spanish territory, and thus, technically, the president was neither in exile nor living outside Spain.

== Casado's coup and the collapse of the Republic (March 1939) ==
=== Situation in the central-southern region ===
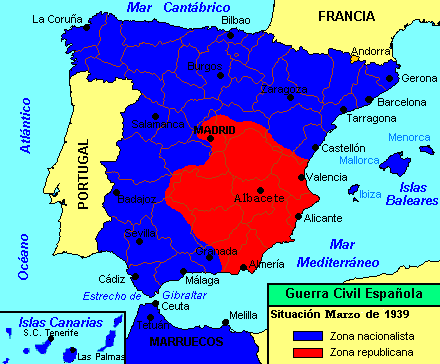
Map of the "two Spains" in March 1939

The only support Negrín could count on at this point, apart from a portion of his party (the negrinista faction) came from the Communist Party of Spain, but this was in decline after the successive defeats in the Battle of the Ebro and the Catalonia Offensive, and its political influence in the central-southern region was smaller in military spheres. Therefore, the possibilities of Negrín's policy "to resist is to win" were very remote, especially when adding the difficulties of receiving military supplies in the central-southern region due to the loss of the Pyrenees and the naval blockade of the rebel fleet in the Mediterranean, apart from the lack of industries that could produce arms and ammunition and the depletion of the Republican coffers. Finally, France and the United Kingdom, Negrín's last hope, were already negotiating with Franco to officially recognize his regime as Spain's legitimate government. He had once again reiterated to London and Paris that he would remain neutral in case war broke out in Europe. Nonetheless, Negrín believed that he could still count on the intact strength of the Army of the Center, the Levantine Army, the Extremaduran Army, and the Andalusian Army, which amounted to a total of 500,000 men, but among the troops and commanders, discouragement and the morale of defeat were spreading, as well as in the Republican rearguard.

On the other hand, the strategy of the Francoist side was to accentuate the differences between the negrinistas and the anti-negrinistas by vaguely insinuating that there could be a negotiation that would put an end to the war if Negrín and the communists disappeared from the Republican political scene. These conversations were held between professional soldiers, in the manner of the 1839 Convention of Vergara that put an end to the First Carlist War, an "offer" which was expanded on by the fifth column, especially in Madrid where it was very well organized and where it had initiated contacts with anti-negrinista Republican military men and politicians.

In the territory that was still in the hands of the Republic, a last battle was unleashed between those who considered it useless to continue fighting and those who still thought that "to resist is to win"—hoping that the tensions in Europe would finally erupt and the United Kingdom and France would at last come to the aid of the Spanish Republic, or at least impose on Franco a peace without reprisals. Already since the spring of 1938, with the collapse of the Aragon front, the idea had been gaining ground in Republican circles that a victorious exit from the war was impossible and that some kind of negotiated solution was necessary. From then on, the internal struggle between those in favor of resistance and those in favor of capitulation only became more acute amid the growing weariness of the population—for instance, desertions in the military had increased in the autumn of 1938—and a more severe division between the political organizations that supported the government and its leaders. Both hunger and the crisis of supplies that plagued the Republican zone also undermined the population's capability for resistance.

=== Negrín's return to Spain and his confrontation with Casado ===
Upon his return to Spain on 10 February 1939, Negrín first went to Valencia, where he met with General José Miaja, commander of the Republican Army. (Note: According to Viñas and Hernández Sánchez (2010), when Negrín and his cabinet went to visit Miaja in Valencia, the latter received them wearing nightclothes. As Minister Vicente Uribe put it, this was a sign that for Miaja, the government was "less than nothing".) Two days later, he was already in Madrid where he took up his post in the building of the Presidency on the Paseo de la Castellana. Once there, he summoned Colonel Segismundo Casado, as the head of the Army of the Center, who explained to him that there were no possibilities for the Republican forces to contain the foreseeable offensive of the Francoist army on the capital, to which Negrín replied, according to the testimony by Casado himself: Estoy de acuerdo con su criterio, pero yo no puedo renunciar a la consigna de resistir. (Note: English: I agree with your judgement, but I cannot renounce to the principle of resisting.) Negrín then called a meeting of the Council of Ministers, which decided to continue fighting. On 15 February, three days after meeting with Negrín, Colonel Casado received the awaited letter from General Fernando Barrón in which he specified the conditions and the plan for capitulation offered by Franco's forces for the surrender of the Republican Army. Colonel Casado told the members of the fifth column that everything was ready for the assault on the communist strongholds to the cry of ¡Viva España y muera Rusia! (Note: English: Long live Spain and death to Russia!) Shortly afterward, Casado received the order from Negrín to attend a meeting of the military high command the following day at Los Llanos Air Force Base in Albacete.

On 16 February 1939, the meeting took place at the Los Llanos base. Besides Negrín and Colonel Casado, as commander of the Army of the Center, those in attendance were: General José Miaja Menant, commander of the Army; General Manuel Matallana Gómez, commander of the Central Region Army Group; General Leopoldo Menéndez López, commander of the Levantine Army; General Antonio Escobar Huerta, commander of the Extremaduran Army; Colonel Domingo Moriones Larraga, commander of the Andalusian Army; Colonel Antonio Camacho Benítez, commander of the Central-South Air Zone; General Carlos Bernal García, commander of the Cartagena Naval Base; and Admiral Miguel Buiza Fernández-Palacios, commander of the Republican Fleet. All of them, except General Miaja, agreed with what Colonel Casado had already told Negrín during the meeting on 12 February: that if the enemy (which was poderoso y con moral de victoria, (Note: English: Powerful with the morale of victory) in the words of General Matallana) unleashed the feared offensive, the Republican Army would not be able to confront it and so it was necessary to put an end to the war. (Note: According to Bahamonde Magro and Cervera Gil (1999), the tone of the meeting at times went beyond the limits of politeness to demonstrate to Negrín a point of view that was clearly defeatist. General Matallana described the pursuit of the war as madness. Even Fleet Admiral Buiza threatened the desertion of the entire squadron. All of them insisted on the shortage of raw materials and supplies, and more than enough demoralization. The conclusion was that it had become urgent to negotiate the peace.) Negrín replied by repeating what he had already told Casado four days earlier: that the conditions for negotiation did not exist because General Franco would only accept unconditional surrender, so the only way out was still resisting. Meanwhile, none of the generals involved in (or who knew about) Casado's conspiracy and who were present, nor Casado himself, said anything to Negrín about the fact that they were already in contact with Franco to surrender. That is the reason why, since 8 February, when the occupation of the island of Menorca by the nationalists had taken place, there had been no offensive action by the rebel army: Franco was waiting for the casadistas (Note: Supporters of Segismundo Casado) to win and oust Negrín from power. Upon his return to Madrid, Colonel Casado, with his position strengthened in his struggle with Negrín, communicated to Franco's agents that the military had left the meeting at Los Llanos feeling sure about the previous agreement to oust the Negrín administration, which lacked legitimacy, and to try to negotiate the peace directly with the enemy.

As to Franco's intentions, a note written by the general himself and communicated on 25 February to the agents of the Military Police and Information Service (SIPM, Franco's secret service) acting in Madrid is very clear:

La rendición debe ser sin condiciones. Allá Casado, que es el responsable, sin intromisiones, ni indiscrecciones [sic] por los nuestros y otros elementos. (...) Respecto a fecha ocupación Madrid lo será cuando se rindan si antes la ofensiva en preparación no nos lo entrega. Esto es, si Jefe Madrid se entrega no combatiremos, si no lo hace lo tomaremos por la fuerza que no nos preocupa. (...) (Note: English: The surrender must be unconditional. There, Casado, who is the one responsible, without interference, without indiscretions by our own and other elements. (...) Regarding the date [of] occupation, Madrid will be when they surrender if the offensive in preparation has not handed it to us before. That is, if [the] Commander [in] Madrid surrenders, we will not fight; if he does not, we will take it by force (...))

=== Negrín's retreat to the "Yuste Position" and the plan of staggered resistance ===
On 24 February, Negrín, for whom the problem was how to end the war without fighting in a way other than unconditional surrender, left Madrid after holding a meeting of the council of ministers. He installed the headquarters of the Presidency in a country house in the middle of a dense pine forest that hid it from the nearby road, near the town of Elda, in Alicante. It was known by the code name Posicion Yuste. (Note: English: Yuste Position) The leadership of the PCE did the same and installed its headquarters near Elda as well, in a palm grove next to the town of Elche. Its code name was Posición Dakar. (Note: English: Dakar Position)

The transfer of Negrín's government and the leadership of the PCE, his main ally, to the interior of the Province of Alicante has been the subject of controversy among historians. Hugh Thomas (1976) pointed out the contradiction he saw in establishing the seat of government in a place so far from Madrid, "if [Negrín] wanted to win the war." In an attempt to explain it, he echoed the interpretation given by the antinegrinistas:

La situación de esta localidad [Elda], no lejos de la costa, hacía sospechar que se preveía la posibilidad de escapatoria. (...) Es probable que, mientras Casado, Matallana y los demás oficiales de Madrid conspiraban con los anarquistas y los políticos de Madrid, Negrín hubiera llegado a la conclusión de que, para asegurar la continuidad de la guerra, era indispensable imponer una especie de dictadura temporal, con el apoyo del Partido Comunista. (Note: English: The situation in this town [Elda], not far from the coast, made one suspect that the possibility of an escape had been foreseen. (...) It is likely that, while Casado, Matallana and the other officers in Madrid were conspiring with the anarchists and the politicians in Madrid, Negrín had come to the conclusion that, in order to ensure the continuity of the war, it was indispensable to impose a sort of temporary dictatorship, with the support of the Communist Party.)

Ángel Bahamonde and Javier Cervera Gil (1999) also consider Negrín's decision to be somewhat inexplicable, because moving away from the capital increased his solitude, that is, his lack of support for the policy of resistance, which some of his ministers were also beginning to question.

Meanwhile, Ángel Viñas and Fernando Hernández Sánchez (2010) found an explanation that ties Negrín's plans to the withdrawal to the Yuste Position. Apparently, after learning of the military situation in the center-south zone, these plans were no longer about resistance at all costs, waiting for the outbreak of the conflict in Europe, but rather a staggered resistance that would allow the withdrawal of the Republican forces towards the Levantine ports to save as many lives as possible, counting on the protection of the fleet anchored in Cartagena. Negrín was convinced, and rightly so, that once Franco attained victory, he was not going to have compassion for the defeated. For the execution of this plan of staggered resistance, the Yuste Position near Elda represented an undeniable strategic position.

Negrín había llegado a la convicción de que solo si se mantenía la resistencia y se lograba controlar un arco de territorio comprendido entre Valencia y Cartagena cabría prolongar la guerra lo suficiente para proceder a una evacuación ordenada a través de los puertos. Para ello decidió instalar el aparato gubernamental en la Posición Yuste... en la encrucijada de las principales vías de comunicación entre el interior y la costa mediterránea. Negrín contó de nuevo con el apoyo comunista. Tras la experiencia del derrumbamiento del aparato del Estado en Cataluña, se temía que en la zona centro-sur el colapso pudiera ser aún más rápido y catastrófico. (Note: English: Negrín had come to the conviction that only if the resistance was maintained and it was possible to control an arc of territory between Valencia and Cartagena, would it be possible to prolong the war long enough to proceed to an orderly evacuation through the ports. To this end, he decided to install the government apparatus in the Yuste Position (...) at the crossroads of the main routes of communication between the countryside and the Mediterranean coast. Once again, Negrín counted on the support of the communists. After the collapse of the state apparatus in Catalonia, it was feared that the collapse in the center-south zone would be even more rapid and catastrophic.)

=== Recognition of Franco by the United Kingdom and France and resignation of Manuel Azaña ===
On Monday 27 February 1939, Franco's government in Burgos was recognized de iure by France and the United Kingdom as the legitimate Government of Spain, after having obtained vague guarantees that "Spaniards who were not criminals" would not be executed. However, these guarantees had no bearing on what was going to happen to the defeated, as the Law of Political Responsibilities—published in the BOE on 13 February—had made clear, and which rolled back the responsibilities of the Republicans to before the beginning of the war, specifically to 1 October 1934. With the official recognition of General Franco, the Second Republic was left definitively stranded.

The following day, Tuesday 28 February, Manuel Azaña's resignation from the Presidency of the Republic was made official and the process began for his provisional replacement by the President of the Cortes, Diego Martínez Barrio (both were in France at the time), according to article 74 of the Republican Constitution of 1931. On 3 March, the Permanent Deputation of the Republican Cortes met in Paris to confirm Martínez Barrio as the interim president, although he would only hold office to settle the situation of the Spanish people with the least harm possible. Before accepting, Martínez Barrio sent a radiogram to Negrín that day, asking him for the government's agreement with the policy established by the Permanent Deputation and to return to Spain accompanied by General Vicente Rojo Lluch. Negrín's government agreed, provided there was no persecution or retaliation by the victors. However, the radiogram never reached its destination, as it was likely intercepted by Colonel Segismundo Casado—all communications to and from the Posición Yuste went through the services in Madrid, which were controlled by Casado—who was aware of the importance and significance of the message that endangered his plans. Therefore, upon not receiving a message from the government, Martínez Barrio did not take office or return to Spain with General Rojo, and the presidency of the Republic remained vacant. According to Viñas and Hernández Sánchez (2010):

En nuestra opinión, hay que añadir el impacto previsible que hubiera podido tener el anuncio de la constitución de una nueva cúpula republicana encabezada por Martínez Barrio, con un programa definido que no divergía en los fundamental del que, con gran fanfarria, anunció más tarde el autodenominado Consejo Nacional de Defensa. (Note: English: In our opinion, it is necessary to consider the potential impact of the announcement of the constitution of a new Republican leadership headed by Martínez Barrio, with a defined program that did not diverge from the one that, with great fanfare, was later announced by the self-styled National Defense Council.)

The president's resignation and the failure to replace him immediately with Martínez Barrio furthered the plans of Colonel Casado and his ally, the anti-negrinista socialist Julián Besteiro. According to Casado, since a state of war had been declared, Negrín's government was no longer the supreme authority in the Republican zone, and it lacked legitimacy because the head of state had resigned. Therefore, this supreme authority fell on General José Miaja, who would preside over the National Defense Council formed after Casado's coup of 5 March.

=== Military coup of Segismundo Casado ===
Meanwhile, the military and political conspiracy against the Negrín administration was well underway, led by the head of the Army of the Center, Colonel Segismundo Casado, who had made contact via the fifth column with Franco's General Headquarters for the surrender of the Republican Army without reprisals—in the manner of the 1839 Convention of Vergara that put an end to the first Carlist war, including the conservation of military jobs and positions. Franco's emissaries never agreed to these conditions. Casado obtained the support of several military commanders, including anarchist Cipriano Mera, commander of the IV Army Corps, and important political figures, such as socialist Julián Besteiro, who had also maintained contact with the fifth columnists in Madrid. All of them criticized Negrín's resistance strategy and his dependence on the Soviet Union and the PCE.

On 5 March, Colonel Casado mobilized his forces—led by the professional soldiers who were convinced that it would be easier to put an end to the war through an understanding among the military—and seized the key points in Madrid. Then, he announced the creation of a National Defense Council presided over by General Miaja and composed of two Republicans, three socialists (Julián Besteiro, Wenceslao Carrillo, and Antonio Pérez Ariño), and two anarchists (Manuel González Marín and Eduardo Val). The Council issued a manifesto via radio addressed to "anti-fascist Spain," in which it removed the Negrín administration from office but did not mention peace negotiations at all. The military units controlled by the communists put up resistance in Madrid and its surroundings but were ultimately defeated, with a death toll of around 2,000 people. The following day Negrín and his government, along with the main communist leaders, left Spain by plane to avoid being captured by the casadistas.

Once Casado's coup was completed, Franco refused to accept a new Convention of Vergara—as Emilio Mola had also refused on the first day of the 1936 coup—and did not grant Casado any of the guarantees that his emissaries, who had only met with low-ranking members at the General Headquarters, had "practically begged for on their knees". Instead, he replied to the British and the French, eager to act as intermediaries in the surrender of the Republic to contain the German and Italian influence on the new regime, that he did not need them, that the spirit of generosity of the victors constituted the best guarantee for the vanquished.

Franco only agreed to an "unconditional surrender", and thus it only remained to prepare for the evacuation of Casado and the National Defense Council. On 29 March, they boarded with their families the British ship that would take them to Marseille. Julián Besteiro decided to stay. The day before, the nationalist troops entered Madrid, and the rebels quickly occupied—practically without a fight—all the central-southern zone that had remained under the authority of the Republic during the whole war. In Alicante, around 15,000 people, including military commanders, Republican politicians, combatants, and civilians who had fled Madrid and other places, crowded into the port waiting to embark on a British or French ship. Most of them did not succeed and were captured by the Italian troops of the Littorio Division, commanded by General Gastone Gambara. Many of those captured were executed on the spot. On 1 April 1939, Radio Nacional de España, the radio station of the rebel faction, broadcast the last war report, which would be repeated over and over again during the following 36 years by the propaganda apparatus of the Francoist dictatorship:

En el día de hoy, cautivo y desarmado el ejército rojo, han alcanzado las tropas nacionales sus últimos objetivos militares. Españoles, la guerra ha terminado.

— Francisco Franco, Caudillo de España (Note: English: Today, with the Red Army captive and disarmed, the nationalist troops have achieved their final military objectives. Spaniards, the war is over. —Francisco Franco, Caudillo of Spain)

That same day, 1 April, the Generalissimo received a telegram from Pius XII, who had been elected pope a month earlier, in which he said to him:

Levantado nuestro corazón al Señor, agradecemos sinceramente, con V. E., deseada victoria católica España (Note: English: Lifting our hearts to God, we thank Your Excellency for the long-awaited victory of Catholic Spain)

The end of the war brought about massive tragedies, such as the exodus of combatants and population to France or the mass capture in the port of Alicante of those who tried to leave on board ships that the victors did not allow to reach port. The internment camps and execution squads awaited them all. The consequences of the civil war would take many years to go away.

== Foreign intervention in favor of the Republic ==
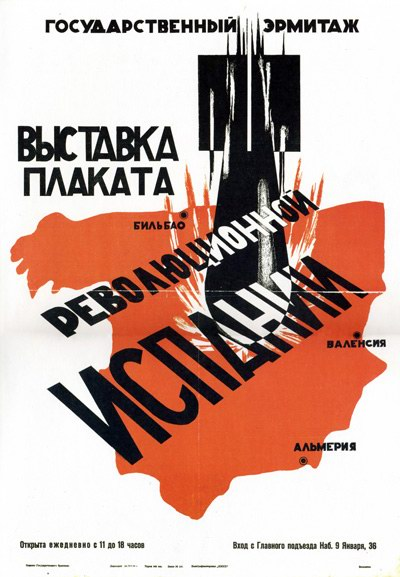
Poster of the exhibition about signs of "Revolutionary Spain" at the Hermitage Museum in Leningrad (USSR), 1936.

In the case of the government, the organization of foreign combatants gave rise to the International Brigades, which a total of around 40,000 men would also go through. The war material that the Republic received was essentially Russian (1,100 airplanes, 300 tanks, 1,500 cannons), French (artillery, airplanes), and Mexican (rifles and ammunition). There still remains the problem of quantifying these armament supplies as well as their usefulness.

=== Immediate aid ===
Faced with the failure of the coup of July 1936 (in terms of the immediate seizure of power), both the rebels and the government urgently sought aid from abroad. The rebel soldiers quickly got help from Fascist Italy and Nazi Germany.

Meanwhile, on 20 July, the Republican government of José Giral asked France for help (airplanes, mainly). The French prime minister, socialist Léon Blum of Popular Front, agreed to this in principle, but uproar from the French right-wing when the request was leaked to the press made him refrain from sending the airplanes. However, they would be sent in the end, though unarmed. Nonetheless, the fundamental factor in the change of attitude of León Blum's government was the British position of neutrality in the "Spanish problem" and the fact that it would not support France if the latter was involved in a war with Germany, because it intervened in the Spanish War—and British support was vital for France in case of war. Therefore, a very politically divided France had to act following the positions of the United Kingdom. The Non-Intervention Committee was a concrete proposal made by France itself on 1 August 1936.

=== Soviet Union ===
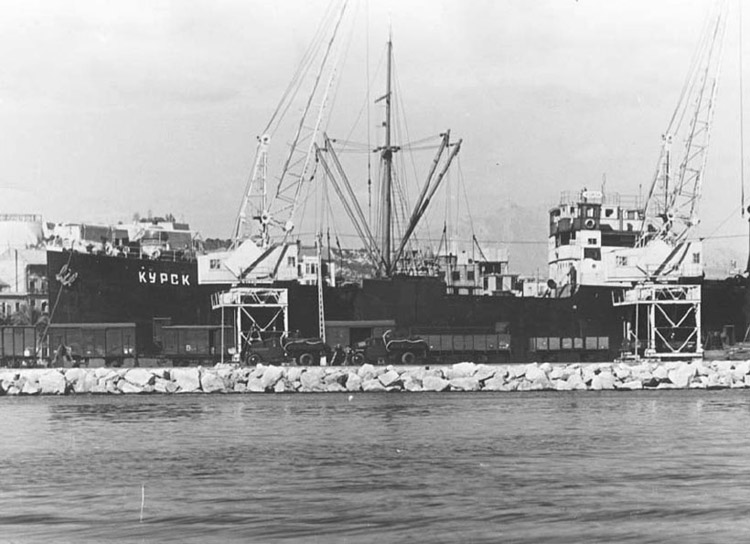
Soviet freighter Kursk unloading military material for the Republic in the port of Alicante.

The first Soviet ships loaded with heavy weapons arrived at the port of Cartagena on 4 and 15 October, almost three months after the start of the Civil War, while the Nationalists had been receiving regular supplies from Italy and Germany since the beginning. Thanks in part to this, the Francoist forces had achieved one victory after another and were about to launch an assault on Madrid. Things changed when Stalin decided to intervene.

The first request for Soviet aid (armaments and ammunition of all kinds and in large quantities) was made by the government of José Giral immediately after the coup through the Soviet ambassador in Paris, because there was no ambassador in Madrid even though the Spanish Republic had established diplomatic relations with the Soviet Union in July 1933. But Stalin did not respond to the request because he did not want to antagonize the United Kingdom and France, who were in favor of non-intervention and with whom he wanted to cooperate to stop Nazi Germany. Also, Stalin believed that helping the Spanish Republic could give the impression that those who said that "international communism" was behind the Republican faction were in the right. That is why the USSR signed the Non-Intervention Agreement on 22 August.

However, when Stalin became fully aware of the aid that the rebels were receiving from Nazi Germany and Fascist Italy, he came to the conclusion that if the Spanish Republic was defeated, the dominance of the Fascist powers in Europe would increase, which would pose a threat to the Soviet Union (as well as to France, a potential ally). That is how, in September 1936, Stalin decided to send war material to the Spanish Republic and ordered the Third International (Comintern) to organize the sending of volunteers. The Secretariat of the Comintern heeded this order on 18 September 1936, which gave rise to the International Brigades.

The USSR sent about 700 airplanes and 400 tanks, as well as approximately 2,000 technicians, pilots, and military advisors, which included agents of the NKVD (the Stalinist secret police), under the command of Alexander Orlov. It also sent fuel, clothing, and food, part of which was paid for through donations.

=== International Brigades ===
Flag of the International Brigades

The International Brigades were not created spontaneously, as claimed by Communist International, but rather it worked on their organization starting from the decision made by its Secretariat on 18 September 1936, at Stalin's request. The leaders of the French Communist Party, led by André Marty, were in charge of the recruitment and organizational aspects, and the recruitment center was established in Paris. But many of its members were truly "freedom volunteers" (as the Republican propaganda called them) who came from countries under dictatorships and fascism, such as Germany, Italy, or Poland, but also from democratic countries like France (which provided the largest number of brigadists, about 9,000), the United Kingdom, and the United States. The latter with the Lincoln Battalion that arrived later, in late 1936, and whose entry into combat took place in the Battle of Jarama in February 1937. Thus, the International Brigades were not the "Army of the Comintern," as claimed by the propaganda from the nationalist faction, an instrument of Stalin's policy. One English worker who enlisted in the International Brigades explained in a letter to his daughter why he had come to Spain to fight:

Now I want to explain to you why I left England. You will have heard about the war going on here. From every country in the world working people like myself have come to Spain to stop Fascism here. So although I am miles away from you, I am fighting to protect you and all children in England as well as people all over the world.

— A British volunteer to his daughter

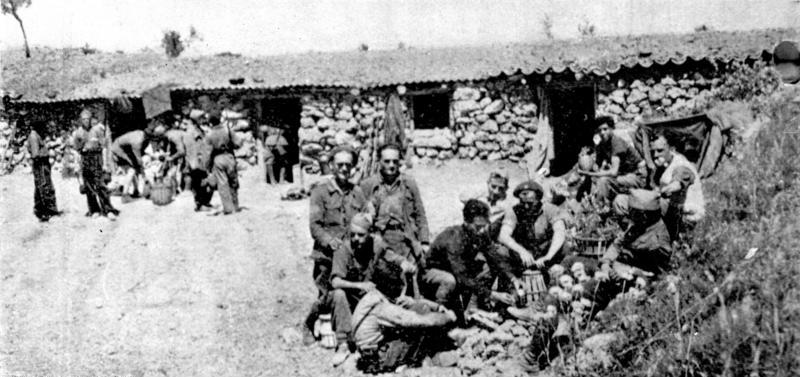
The Etkar André Battalion of the International Brigades

While Hugh Thomas (1961) mentioned the number of brigadists who fought in Spain was around 40,000—much less than the 100,000 claimed by the Francoist propaganda to inflate the influence of "international communism", more detailed and recent studies place the figure at a little less than 35,000, not far from the figure estimated by Thomas. What has also been proven is that there were never more than 20,000 fighters at any one time and that about 10,000 died in combat.

The training center was located in Albacete and the five brigades—from the XI to the XV—were organized there. The XI, commanded by Soviet general Emilio Kléber, and the XII, by Hungarian writer Máté Zalka, played a prominent role in the Siege of Madrid.

Canadian volunteers made up the Mackenzie–Papineau Battalion (also known as Mac-Paps). There was also a small group of US pilots who made up the Yankee Squadron, led by Bert Acosta. There were famous brigadists, writers, and poets such as Ralph Winston Fox, Charles Donnelly, John Cornford, and Christopher Caudwell, who would describe their experiences at the front.

In 1938, the number of brigadists had been reduced significantly (around one-third remained). On 21 September, before the General Assembly of the League of Nations in Geneva, the president of the Republican government Juan Negrín announced the immediate and unconditional withdrawal of all foreign combatants fighting in the Republican faction, with the hope that the Nationalist faction would do the same. A month later, on 28 October 1938, the International Brigades marched through the streets of Barcelona for the last time in an event led by the President of the Republic Manuel Azaña and Prime Minister Juan Negrín, with around 250,000 people in attendance. Around the same time, Mussolini withdrew around 10,000 soldiers from the Corpo Truppe Volontarie "as a gesture of goodwill" towards the Non-Intervention Committee, but 30,000 Italian soldiers continued to fight in Spain until the end of the war.

== See also ==
- Spanish Civil War
- Timeline of the Spanish Civil War
- International response to the Spanish Civil War
- Non-intervention in the Spanish Civil War
- Francoist Spain
- Spanish Republican exiles
- Spanish Republican government in exile
- Posición Yuste

== Bibliography ==
- Alía Miranda, Francisco (2018). Historia del Ejército español y de su intervención política: del Desastre del 98 a la Transición (in Spanish). Madrid: Los Libros de la Catarata. ISBN 978-84-9097-459-9.
- Aróstegui, Julio (1997). La guerra civil, 1936-1939: la ruptura democrática (in Spanish). Madrid: Temas de hoy. ISBN 84-7679-320-0.
- Aróstegui, Julio (2006). Por qué el 18 de julio... y después (in Spanish). Barcelona: Flor del Viento Ediciones. ISBN 84-96495-13-2.
- Bahamonde, Ángel; Cervera, Javier (1999). Así terminó la guerra de España (in Spanish). Madrid: Marcial Pons. ISBN 84-95379-00-7.
- Casanova, Julián (2004). Preston, Paul (ed.). Anarchism, the Republic, and Civil War in Spain, 1931–1939. Translated by Dowling, Andrew; Pollok, Graham. London: Routledge. ISBN 041532095X.
- Casanova, Julián (2007). Fontana, Josep; Villares, Ramón (eds.). República y Guerra Civil (in Spanish). Barcelona: Marcial Pons. ISBN 978-84-8432-878-0.
- Casanova, Julián; Gil Andrés, Carlos (2014). Twentieth-Century Spain: A History. Translated by Douch, Martin. Cambridge: Cambridge University Press. ISBN 9781107016965.
- Cervera Gil, Javier (1995). "Violencia en el Madrid de la Guerra Civil: los 'paseos' (julio a diciembre de 1939)" (PDF). Studia Historica. Historia Contemporánea (in Spanish). 13. University of Salamanca: 63–82. ISSN 0213-2087.
- Cervera Gil, Javier (2006). Madrid en guerra: la ciudad clandestina, 1936-1939 (in Spanish). Alianza Editorial. ISBN 84-206-4731-4.
- Graham, Helen (2002). The Spanish Republic at War, 1936–1939. Cambridge: Cambridge University Press. ISBN 9780521459327.
- Graham, Helen (2005). The Spanish Civil War. A very short introduction. Oxford: Oxford University Press. ISBN 978-0-19-280377-1.
- Hopkins, James K. (1998). "6. Citizens of the World". Into the Heart of the Fire: The British in the Spanish Civil War. Redwood City, California: Stanford University Press. pp. 108–126. doi:10.1515/9781503616974-010.
- Juliá, Santos (1999). Un siglo de España. Política y sociedad (in Spanish). Barcelona: Marcial Pons. ISBN 84-9537903-1.
- Molina, Lucas; Sagarra, Pablo; González, Óscar (2021). El factor humano. Organización y liderazgo para ganar una guerra. La Jefatura de Movilización, Instrucción y Recuperación en la Guerra Civil española (PDF) (in Spanish). Madrid: Ministry of Defence. ISBN 978-84-9091-610-0.
- Thomas, Hugh (1961). The Spanish Civil War. New York: Harper & Brothers Publishers.
- Thomas, Hugh (1976). La guerra civil española: 1936–1939, tomo 2 (in Spanish). Translated by Daurella, Neri. Barcelona: Editorial Grijalbo. ISBN 84-397-0806-8.
- Viñas, Ángel; Hernández Sánchez, Fernando (2010). El desplome de la República (in Spanish). Barcelona: Editorial Crítica. ISBN 978-84-9892-108-3.
- Wyden, Peter H. (1984). The Passionate War, The Narrative History of the Spanish Civil War 1936–1939. New York: Simon and Schuster. ISBN 9780671253318.
