= José María Jover =

Spanish historian

José María Jover Zamora (Cartagena, 5 June 1920 - Madrid, 14 November, 2006) was a Spanish historian.

== Career ==
He was the most influential figure in developing contemporary Spanish historiography. In 1949, he became professor of "Universal History of the Modern Age" and "General Cultural History" at the University of Valencia. Later, he moved to the Complutense University of Madrid. In the mid-1960s, Jover was attracted to the new historiographical trends in Europe. The Annales School and the Catalán historian Jaume Vicens Vives were his major influences. Among his students are many famous historians, such as Javier Tusell, Elena Hernández Sandoica, Juan Pablo Fusi and Ángel Bahamonde.

In 1975, he was placed in charge of the Historia de España, begun and edited by Ramón Menéndez Pidal, who died before it was completed. Jover restructured and amplified the original plan.

== Honors ==
- Spanish National History Prize (1981)
- Doctor Honoris Causa at the University of Murcia (1985)
- Menéndez Pelayo International Prize (2000)
- Doctor Honoris Causa at the Charles III University of Madrid (2004)

== Selected works ==
- Historia de España: la Edad Contemporánea, Teide (1979)
- La Civilización Española a Mediados del Siglo XIX, Espasa-Calpe (1992) ISBN 978-84-239-7259-3
- Realidad y Mito de la Primera República, Espasa-Calpe (1991) ISBN 978-84-239-1994-9
- Historiadores Españoles de Nuestro Siglo, Real Academia de la Historia (1999) ISBN 978-84-8951-222-1
- España en la Política Internacional: Siglos XVIII-XIX, Marcial Pons (1999) ISBN 978-84-95379-04-7
