= Justino de Azcárate =

Spanish lawyer and politician

Justino de Azcárate y Flórez
- Azcárate c. 1983

Deputy for Leon
- In office 1931–1936

Minister of State
- In office 19 July 1936 – 19 July 1936
- Preceded by: Augusto Barcía Trelles
- Succeeded by: Augusto Barcía Trelles

Royal Senator
- In office 21 July 1977 – 2 January 1979

Senator for Leon
- In office 1 March 1979 – 31 August 1982

Personal details
- Born: 23 August 1903 León, Spain
- Died: 17 May 1989 (aged 85) Caracas, Venezuela
- Occupation: Lawyer, politician

Justino de Azcárate y Flórez (23 August 1903 – 17 May 1989) was a Spanish lawyer and politician. He came from a wealthy family with a tradition of involvement in politics, and had republican but not left-wing opinions. He was a deputy in the Second Spanish Republic, an exile in Venezuela for 38 years after the Spanish Civil War, and then a Senator in Spain after the return to democracy. He played a significant role in easing the transition back to democracy.

== Origins ==
Justino de Azcárate Flores was born in León, Spain, on 26 June 1903. He was from a prominent liberal intellectual family of León. His family was Basque in origin, but an ancestor who was an official in the King's Treasury had settled in León in 1690. His grandfather, Patricio de Azcárate, was governor of several provinces, translated the complete works of Plato and Aristotle, and also translated works of Gottfried Wilhelm Leibniz. His uncle was Gumersindo de Azcárate, a scholar, lawyer and Republican deputy of León for thirty years, head of the Republican-Socialist minority until shortly before his death in 1917. His father made his career in the army. Justino's older brother Pablo de Azcárate (1890–1971) became a deputy of León and then ambassador to the United Kingdom during the Second Spanish Republic.

Justino de Azcárate was brought up in a prosperous household and was educated in English, and then at the German school for five years. After this he went to the Residencia de Estudiantes in Madrid where he finished the baccalaureate, and then began to study Law. After graduating he was assistant to Adolfo González Posada^{(es)} at the university. He was deeply involved in the movement to overthrow the dictatorship of Miguel Primo de Rivera. He knew socialists such as Julián Besteiro and Fernando de los Ríos, but was not a socialist himself. He became secretary to the group of intellectuals Al Servicio de la República^{(es)}. Fernando de los Ríos came to hide in his house after the repression that followed the Jaca uprising of 12 December 1930. It was in his house that Francisco Largo Caballero and the others decided to surrender to the government and go to jail.

== Second Spanish Republic ==
At the start of the Second Spanish Republic in 1931 Azcárate was elected Deputy of León, following the family tradition. At the age of 29 he was appointed Undersecretary of Justice to the Socialist Minister Fernando de los Ríos in the Republican Coalition government. He remained a member of Al Servicio de la República until it was dissolved in September 1932, then joined the National Republican Party^{(es)} when it was formed under the leadership of Felipe Sánchez-Román. His party did not join the Popular Front because it included Communists.

At the outbreak of the Spanish Civil War Azcárate was appointed Minister of State in the Government of Diego Martínez Barrio on the night of 18–19 July 1936. He did not take office since when the appointment was made he was near León, a city that immediately fell into the hands of the rebels. Azcárate was on his family property in Villimer, near León, and went into hiding. He and his brother-in-law José Entrecanales Ibarra^{(es)} were arrested few days later in Burgos, and he was taken to the Valladolid prison, at first under the protection of General Mola. He was released from captivity in October 1937 when he was involved in a prisoner swap with Raimundo Fernández-Cuesta. After his release he worked in France for a rapprochement between the two sides through the Paris-based Paz Civil de España movement. He helped arrange exchanges, pardons and commutations of death sentences.

== Exile ==
After the war Azcárate spent almost forty years in exile in Venezuela. He started a family in Venezuela, and by 1984 had 14 grandchildren and 17 great-grandchildren. In Venezuela he was an economic adviser at the highest level of government, and director of the Mendoza Foundation. The foundation was established in 1951 by Eugenio Mendoza. Azcárate and his fellow-exile Pedro Grases were among Mendoza's direct collaborators. He collaborated with Mendoza between 1946 and 1977. He began travelling to Spain in the 1960s with the financial support of the Banco Urquijo^{(es)}, a Spanish private investment bank and industrial group. In Spain he encouraged corporate philanthropy and introduced new ideas about philanthropy to the artistic and cultural elite. He put the emerging Spanish private foundation movement in contact with Medoza and other leading philanthropists in Latin America and the USA. In 1973 Azcárate helped José Lino Vaamonde to prepare an account of the work done by the team to protect the Spanish artistic heritage during the civil war.

== Return to Spain ==
On 15 June 1977 Azcárate had just arrived at his office in the Fundación Mendoza in Caracas when he received a call from King Juan Carlos I, who asked him to accept an appointment as a senador real (Royal Senator). When he finally returned the newspapers greeted the news as a sign that things were returning to normal. He was a senator in the Independent parliamentary group from 21 July 1977 to 2 January 1979. After his return to Spain Azcárate played an important role in the transition to democracy. Although a republican, he at once grasped the important role that the monarchy would play in reconciling the supporters of both sides in the civil war. Azcarate introduced a measure, passed by a wide margin, that called for repatriation of the physical remains of King Alfonso XIII and of Manuel Azaña, first president of the republic, and for the return to the Spanish people of Pablo Picasso's painting Guernica, then being held by the Museum of Modern Art in New York City. After his term as Royal Senator was over he joined the Union of the Democratic Centre (UCD) and was elected to the Cortes Generales as senator for León on 1 March 1979. He was a member of the legislature from 1 March 1979 to 31 August 1982.

Soon after his return to Spain Azcárate was elected President of the Asociación de Defensa del Patrimonio Hispania Nostra (Our Spain Association for Protection of Heritage). He was president of the Francisco Giner de los Ríos Foundation. During the 1980s Azcárate played a key role in formalizing contacts between the Centro de Fundaciones de España, created in 1977 and the Latin American equivalents. In September 1982 he was elected president of the patronato of the Museo del Prado. In November 1984 he was elected to the executive committee of the Democratic Reformist Party (PRD) in the constituent congress arranged by Miquel Roca. Justino de Azcárate Flores died on 17 May 1989 in Caracas, Venezuela, aged 85. His nephew Manuel Azcárate was a Spanish journalist, politician and a leader of the Communist Party of Spain (Partido Comunista de España, PCE) in the 1960s and 1970s.

== Publications ==
- Azcárate, Justino de (1977-12-02), "Reflexiones e impaciencias. El pasado y el presente", La Vanguardia, Barcelona
- Azcárate, Gumersindo de; Azcárate, Justino de; Rebollo, Enrique Orduña (1979), Municipalismo y Regionalismo (in Spanish), Instituto de Estudios de Administración Local, ISBN 978-84-7088-243-2

== Sources ==
- Areilza, José María de (19 May 1989), "Justino de Azcárate, ex senador", El País (in Spanish)
- Arenas Dorado, Sagrario, "Azcárate y Flórez, Justino de (1903-1989)", MCN Biografias (in Spanish)
- Azcárate Flórez, Justino (in Spanish), Senate of Spain
- Detalle grupo parlamentario : Constituinte (in Spanish), Senate of Spain
- Donación Joselino Vaamonde Horcada (PDF) (in Spanish), Ministerio de Educación, Cultura y Deporte
- Jauregui, Fernando (26 November 1984), "Justino Azcárate", El País (in Spanish), Madrid
- "Justino de Azcárate, nuevo presidente del Patronato del Museo del Prado", El País (in Spanish), 16 September 1982
- "Manuel Azcárate muere en Madrid a los 81 años". El País (in Spanish). Madrid. 1998-08-25.
- Martin, Russell (2012), Picasso's War, Hol Art Books, ISBN 978-1-936102-25-9
- Pérez, Paloma Fernández; Lluch, Andrea (2016-02-26), Evolution of Family Business: Continuity and Change in Latin America and Spain, Edward Elgar Publishing, ISBN 978-1-78536-315-3
- Rees, Philip (1990), Biographical Dictionary of the Extreme Right Since 1890, New York: Simon & Schuster, ISBN 0-13-089301-3
- Vicent, Manuel (12 December 1981), "Justino Azcárate, caballero con caballo", El País (in Spanish)
