= Posición Yuste =

Codename for a location of the Spanish Republican Government

Coordinates: 38°30′12″N 0°47′50″W

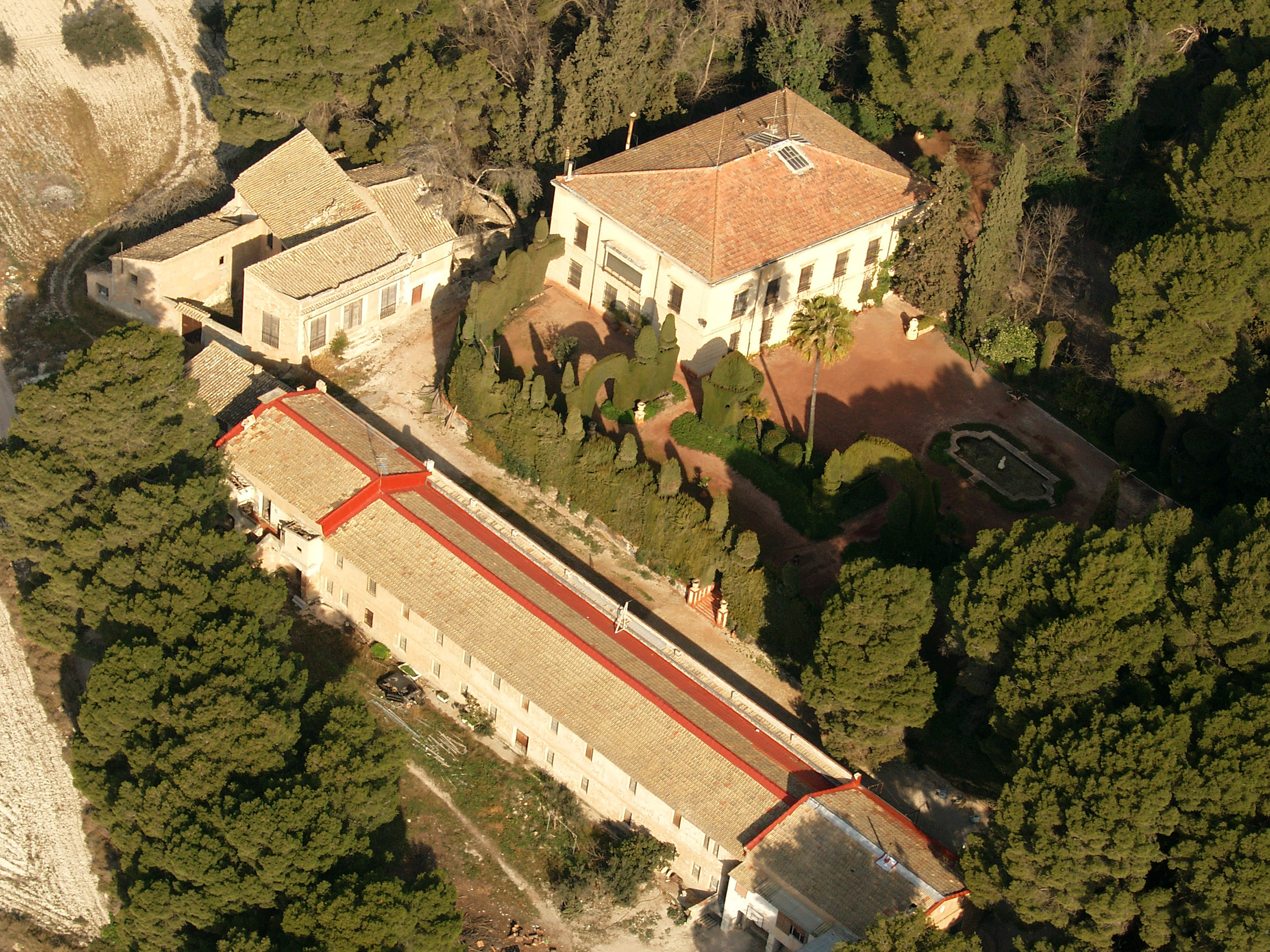
Aerial view of the so-called posición Yuste, the El Poblet estate on the outskirts of Petrer (Alicante), declared a site of cultural interest.

The Posición Yuste (English: Yuste Position) was the codename given to the location where the Government of the Spanish Republic was established shortly before the end of the Spanish Civil War. The government, presided over by Juan Negrín, was established there from 25 February to 6 March 1939. Its name alludes to the retirement of Charles I of Spain to the Monastery of Yuste in Extremadura. The position was located in the Province of Alicante, specifically in an estate in the town of Petrer known as El Poblet.

== History ==
On 24 February, President Juan Negrín, for whom the problem was how to end the war in a way other than unconditional surrender, left Madrid after holding a Council of Ministers and installed the seat of the Presidency of the Government in a country house in the middle of a dense pine forest that hid it from the nearby road. It was located in the municipal district of the Alicante town of Petrer, the "posición Yuste" (its codename). It was barely fifteen kilometers from the nearby Monóvar airfield. The leadership of the Communist Party of Spain, the main ally of Negrín's government, did the same and installed its headquarters near Elda, in a palm grove near Elche called Posición Dakar.

=== Debate among historians ===
The transfer of Negrín's government and the PCE leadership to the interior of the Province of Alicante has been the subject of controversy among historians. Hugh Thomas pointed out in 1976 the contradiction he saw in setting up the government's seat in a place so far from Madrid, "if Negrín wanted to win the war". Thomas, attempting to provide an explanation, echoes the interpretation given by the "anti-Negrín" faction: "The location of this town suggested that the possibility of an escape was foreseen". Ángel Bahamonde and Javier Cervera (1999) also consider Negrín's decision somewhat inexplicable because by moving away from the capital, his isolation increased, that is, his lack of support for the policy of resistance, which some of his ministers were also beginning to question.

More recently, Ángel Viñas and Fernando Hernández Sánchez (2010) have found an explanation by linking the withdrawal to the Posición Yuste with Negrín's plans, which, after learning of the military situation in the Center-South zone, apparently were no longer for resistance at all costs, waiting for conflict to break out in Europe, but for a staggered resistance that would allow Republican forces to retreat towards the ports of Levante to save as many lives as possible, counting on the protection of the Navy anchored in Cartagena. This was because Negrín was aware that Francisco Franco, once he achieved victory, would have no mercy for the vanquished. And for the execution of this staggered resistance plan, the Posición Yuste presented an undeniable strategic position:

Negrín had become convinced that only if resistance was maintained and an arc of territory between Valencia and Cartagena could be controlled would it be possible to prolong the war long enough to proceed with an orderly evacuation through the ports. To this end, he decided to install the governmental apparatus at the Posición Yuste... at the crossroads of the main communication routes between the interior and the Mediterranean coast. Negrín again had communist support. After the experience of the collapse of the state apparatus in Catalonia, it was feared that in the center-south zone the collapse could be even faster and more catastrophic.

— Viñas and Hernández Sánchez, El desplome de la República.
