= Cortes republicanas =

Spanish parliament (1931–1939)

Republican Courts Cortes republicanas

History
- Established: 14 July 1931
- Disbanded: February 1939

Leadership
- Julián Besteiro (1931–1933)
- Santiago Alba Bonifaz (1933–1936)
- Diego Martínez Barrio (1936–1939)

Structure

Meeting place
- Palacio de las Cortes, Carrera de San Jerónimo, Madrid (Note: During the civil war they met on an itinerant basis in Valencia and Catalonia.)

The Cortes republicanas (English: Republican Courts), officially called Cortes – also called the Congreso de los Diputados (English: Congress of Deputies) – were the unicameral legislature of the Second Spanish Republic between 1931 and 1939. After the end of the Civil War they met several times in exile, the last in 1945.

== History ==
After the constituent elections of 1931, the Cortes, in charge of drawing up a new Constitution, were inaugurated on 14 July 1931. The composition of the chamber in the constituent period was dominated by the centre and left parties, the majority being Republican – socialist. The socialist Julián Besteiro was the first president of the Cortes, first interim and then definitively elected on 28 July 1931. On 1 October 1931, the Chamber approved the constitutional article that would enshrine women's suffrage with 161 votes in favour and 121 against. The 1931 Constitution was finally approved on 9 December 1931 with 368 votes in favour and none against (89 right-wing deputies absent). The text regulated the figure of the Permanent Deputation, with the function of assuming the functions of the parliamentary chamber during its parentheses. In July 1933, the Chamber would approve an electoral law that would accentuate the premium for majorities that had already been introduced by the legislation promulgated by the provisional government before the first elections of 1931 were held.

The 1933 elections, already held under the new legislation, gave rise to a parliamentary change and a chamber with the right-wing CEDA as the largest parliamentary group. Opened on 8 December 1933, the new Cortes provisionally elected the radical Santiago Alba as president of the chamber. In November 1934, the change in the regulations of the Cortes was approved.

The 1936 elections, also developed with the electoral law of 1933, gave a parliamentary majority to the left-wing Popular Front. The Republican Diego Martínez Barrio would be elected president of the Cortes.

During the course of the civil war, the Cortes did not meet again in Madrid and became itinerant: they held sessions in 1937 in Valencia (in the Valencia City Hall building and in the Lonja de la Seda) and in 1938 in the monastery of Montserrat and in San Cugat. Close to the end of the conflict, the Cortes, on their way to exile, held their last session in Spanish territory on 1 February 1939 in the castle of San Fernando de Figueras, closing this session at 12:45 p.m.

Once the civil war ended and the dictatorship of Francisco Franco was established throughout the Spanish territory in 1939, the Cortes republicanas continued to meet in exile.

== Elections ==

Distribution of seats in the i, ii and iii legislature of the courts by political position, according to Leonardo Morlino.
Left-wing
Centre-left wing
Centre
Centre-right wing
Right-wing

=== Electoral constituencies ===
The legislation of May 1931 introduced by the Provisional Government modified the Decree of 8 August 1907 and the Restoration districts by provincial constituencies, with the exception of province capitals with a population of more than 100,000 inhabitants, which were constituted as independent constituencies to the provincial. In addition, Cartagena, Ceuta and Melilla also formed a circumscription. The 1931 elections were therefore carried out with 63 constituencies.

After the implementation of the electoral law of 1933, with the increase to 150,000 inhabitants of the necessary population of a provincial capital to establish itself as an independent constituency from the provincial one, the capitals of Córdoba and Granada lost their constituency status. The Cartagena constituency used in 1931 was integrated into that of Murcia (province) for the 1933 and 1936 elections.

=== Elections held ===
- 1931 Spanish general election
- 1933 Spanish general election
- 1936 Spanish general election

== See also ==
- Cortes Generales
- Cortes Españolas

== Bibliography ==
- Aguiló Lúcia, Lluís (1992). Notas sobre la historia política de la ciudad de Valencia (1876-1939) (in Spanish). Cuadernos constitucionales de la Cátedra Fadrique Furió Ceriol. pp. 59–65. ISSN 1133-7087.
- Cabrera Calvo-Sotelo, Mercedes (1995a). Las Cortes republicanas (in Spanish). Ayer. pp. 13–47. ISSN 1134-2277.
- Cabrera Calvo-Sotelo, Mercedes (1995b). El Parlamento en la crisis de la Monarquía de la Restauración y en la II República (in Spanish). Centro de Estudios Constitucionales. pp. 55–82. ISSN 0214-6185.
- Fuentes Codera, Maximiliano (2009). El castell de Sant Ferran i Figueres durant la Segona República i la Guerra Civil (in Spanish). Annals de l'Institut d'Estudis Empordanesos. pp. 315–338. ISSN 1136-0267.
- García Santos, Felipe (1980). Léxico y política de la Segunda República (in Spanish). Universidad de Salamanca. ISBN 84-7481-113-9.
- Giménez Martínez, Miguel Ángel (2015). El régimen parlamentario de la Segunda República y la relaciones entre su presidente, el Gobierno y las Cortes (in Spanish). Hispania Nova. ISSN 1138-7319.
- González Martínez, Carmen (1999). Guerra Civil en Murcia: un análisis sobre el poder y los comportamientos (in Spanish). Universidad de Murcia. ISBN 84-8371-096-X.
- Hernández Lafuente, Adolfo (1980). Autonomía e Integración en la Segunda República (in Spanish). Encuentro Ediciones. ISBN 84-7490-044-1.
- Monterde García, Juan Carlos (2010). Algunos aspectos sobre el voto femenino en la II República (in Spanish). Anuario de la Facultad de Derecho. pp. 261–277. ISSN 0213-988X.
- Montero, José R.; Llera, Francisco J; Torcal, Mariano (1992). "Sistemas electorales en España: una recapitulación" (PDF). Reis (in Spanish) (58). Reis: Revista española de investigaciones sociológicas: 7–56. doi:10.2307/40183556. ISSN 0210-5233. JSTOR 40183556.
- Mota Muñoz, José Fernando (2013). Reunió de les Corts republicanes a Pins del Vallès (in Spanish). Història de Sant Cugat del Vallès (blog).
- Oliver Araujo, Joan (1997). La Constitución republicana de 1931 (in Spanish). Dereito. pp. 107–199. ISSN 1132-9947.
- Peña González, José (2011). El sueño de la "restauración" republicana (in Spanish). Revista de Derecho Político. pp. 13–36. ISSN 0210-7562.
- Sánchez, Miquel (1993). La segona república i la guerra civil a Cerdanyola (1931-1939) (in Spanish). Publicacions de l'Abadia de Montserrat. ISBN 84-7826-423-X.
- Gracia, Francisco (2012). Zaragoza en el Congreso de los Diputados (PDF) (in Spanish). Institución Fernando el Católico. ISBN 978-84-9911-163-6.
- Sierra Cibiriain, Gabriela; Gracia, Francisco (2012). Zaragoza en el Congreso de los Diputados (PDF). Zaragoza: Institución Fernando el Católico. ISBN 978-84-9911-163-6.
