= Paloma Fernández Pérez =

Spanish historian (born 1964)

Paloma Fernández Pérez (born 1964, Barcelona), is Catedrática/Professor of economic and business history at the University of Barcelona.

== Education ==
She has a Licenciada en Geografia e Historia (University of Barcelona, 1987), Master of Arts in History (University of California at Berkeley, 1989), and PhD in history (University of California at Berkeley, 1994).

Her bachelor's dissertation under the supervision of Carlos Martínez-Shaw dealt with the history of economic press in Spain in the 18th century. Her PhD dissertation Family and Marriage Around Colonial Trade in Eighteenth-Century Cádiz, under the supervision of Richard Herr, was published in Spanish as El rostro familiar de la metrópoli. Redes de parentesco y lazos mercantiles en Cádiz 1700-1812 (Madrid: Siglo XXI de España Editores, 1997).

== Research ==
Fernández Pérez has studied the influence of entrepreneurial networks in the creation and expansion of businesses in developing economies of past, and present times. Her focus has been family businesses and how family-owned and managed firms have been resilient and enduring forms of reducing uncertainty and transaction costs across borders and time. Alone or in collaborative articles and books Fernández Pérez has presented a long-term overview of evolution and transformation of relevant strategies of large Spanish family firms regarding: gender roles, training and education, professionalization of management, internationalization, networking and collective action.

She has also published Un siglo y medio de trefilería en España. Rivière y Moreda (Barcelona, Trivium 2004), has coedited with P. Pascual Del metal al motor. Innovación y atraso en la historia de la industria metalmecánica española (Bilbao, FBBVA 2007), coedited with M. B. Rose Innovation and Entrepreneurial Networks in Europe (Oxford, Routledge 2009), with Andrea Colli The endurance of Family businesses (Cambridge University PRess 2013), with Jeff Fear and Christina Lubinski Family Multinationals (Routledge 2013), and with Andrea Lluch Familias empresarias y empresas familiares en América Latina y España (Bilbao 2015). She is writing a book for Emerald Publishers about the emergence of a managerial revolution in large hospitals of the world in the first decades of the 20th century.

Fernández Pérez has organized several panel sessions for the European Business History Association and the Spanish Association of Economic History. She is member of the Asociación Española de Historia Económica, the Society for Spanish and Portuguese Historical Studies, the European Business History Association and the Business History Conference. She has been member of the council board of the EBHA, and Trustee of the BHC. She has been refereeing articles and/or reviewing books for Revista de Historia Industrial, Investigaciones de Historia Económica, Revista de Historia Económica, Business History, and Enterprise&Society, among others. She is member of the council board of the Centre of Studies in Economics and Economic History Antoni de Capmany from Universitat de Barcelona, and of the Entrepreneurial History Discussion Papers website.

== Awards and recognition ==
She has received several fellowships and awards from Spanish, U.S. and British institutions: La Caixa/Indiana Fellowship to study a M.A. in the U.S. (1988), Fulbright Fellowship to study a PhD in history in the U.S. (1989), P.E.O. Fellowship Award (1989), Mellon Write-Up Dissertation Grant from U.C. Berkeley (1990), Travel grants from U.I.M.P. in 1987, Catalan government travel grants in 1989, Instituto de la Empresa Familiar Travel Grant in 1996, Fundación Banco Bilbao Vizcaya Argentaria Grant for Research in Economics and Business Studies (2003), and several public competitive research projects from the Spanish Ministerio de Educación y Ciencia y Ministerio de Ciencia e Innovación (2005 and 2008), and from Fundación BBVA. She is coordinator at the University of Barcelona of a Marie Sklodowska Curie RISE (Research and Innovation Staff Exchange) Action of the European Union led by University of Southern Denmark (2019-2023). The University of Lancaster and the University of York in the UK, as well as the University of Los Andes in Colombia, have nominated her Honorary Visiting Fellow for cooperation in research and teaching initiatives. Since 2019 the University of Kyoto/Asian Platform for Global Sustainability and Transcultural Studies has nominated her Project Professor. She has been member of the council board of the journal Investigaciones de Historia Económica, coeditor of the journal Business History, and cofounder and coeditor in chief of the Journal of Evolutionary Studies in Business. She has founded and coordinates the virtual Network of Interdisciplinary Research in Family Firms, has received two awards of the ICREA agency of the Catalan government for her excellence in research (2008-2013 and 2013–2018), an award of the Spanish Association of Economic History for the best (coedited) book in Spanish and Latin American economic history (2018), and an award of the Instituto Argentino de la Empresa Familiar for the best research book on family businesses (2016).

== Selected publications ==
- with A. Colli, M.B. Rose, "National Determinants of Family Firm Development? Family Firms in Britain, Spain and Italy in the Nineteenth and Twentieth Centuries" Enterprise and Society, 4-1 (2003), pp. 28–64
- "Reinstalando la empresa familiar en la Economía y la Historia Económica. Una aproximación a debates teóricos recientes", Cuadernos de Economía y Dirección de Empresas, 17 (2003)
- with N. Puig, "Knowledge and Training in Family Firms of the European Periphery: Spain, XVIII to XXth centuries", Business History, 46-1 (2004), pp. 79– 99
- "Redes empresariales en el sector del metal: el caso de las industrias del alambre de hierro y acero en España (1880-1974)”, Investigaciones de Historia Económica, 4 (2006), pp. 51–76
- with L. Gálvez, "Female Entrepreneurship in Spain during the Nineteenth and Twentieth Centuries", Business History Review, Special Issue on women in the service sector, Autumn 2007, vol. 81, no 3, 495–516.
- with N. Puig, "Bonsais in a Wild Forest? A historical Approach to the Longevity of Large Historical Family Firms in Spain", Revista de História Económica. Journal of Iberian and Latin American Economic History, 25-3 (2007), pp. 459– 497
- "Small Firms and Networks in Capital Intensive Industries: The Case of Spanish Steelwire Manufacturing", Business history, Sept. 2007, vol. 49, no. 5, 647–667.
- with N. Puig, "Silent Revolution. The internationalization of large Spanish family firms". Special Issue on internationalization of firms edited by Peter Buckley and John Wilson, Business History, forthcoming.
- Fernández Pérez, Paloma (2021). The emergence of modern hospital management and organisation in the world 1880s-1930s. Bingley, U.K: Emerald Publishing Limited. ISBN 9781787699915.
- Donzé, Pierre-Yves; Fernández Pérez, Paloma, eds. (2022). The business of health: new approaches to the evolution of health systems in the world. London New York: Routledge. ISBN 978-1032187396.
