= Julio Aróstegui =

Spanish historian (1939–2013)

- Born: 24 July 1939; Granada
- Died: 28 January 2013 (aged 73); Madrid
- Awards: National History Award (1981)

Julio Aróstegui Sánchez (1939–2013) was a Spanish historian. Professor at the Complutense University of Madrid (UCM), some of his research lines included the study of political violence in Modern Spanish history, Carlism, the Spanish Transition, the Spanish Civil War, the history of the workers' movement and collective memory. His scholar production also intertwined with the theoretical problems of history and the methodology of research.

== Biography ==
Born on 24 July 1939 in Granada, Aróstegui studied at the Colegio Mayor Isabel la Católica, thanks to a scholarship. He took higher studies at the University of Granada and in Madrid. He earned a chair as professor of secondary education in a high school in Vitoria in 1967. He earned a PhD in History in 1970 by reading a dissertation titled El carlismo alavés y la guerra civil de 1870-1976, supervised by Vicente Palacio Atard. He worked for years attached to the Consejo Superior de Investigaciones Científicas (CSIC).

He earned a Chair of History at the Complutense University of Madrid in 1984. Retired, he served as emeritus professor between 2009 and 2012.

He died in Madrid on 28 January 2013.

== Works ==
- — (2002). Don Juan de Borbón. Madrid: Arlanza Ediciones, S. A.
- — (2004). La historia vivida. Sobre la historia del presente. Madrid: Alianza.
- — (2013). Largo Caballero. El tesón y la quimera. Madrid: Debate.
- — (2013). Combatientes requetés de la Guerra Civil española (1936-1939). Madrid: La Esfera de los Libros. (reedition)
