= Ángel Bahamonde Magro =

Spanish historian (born 1949)

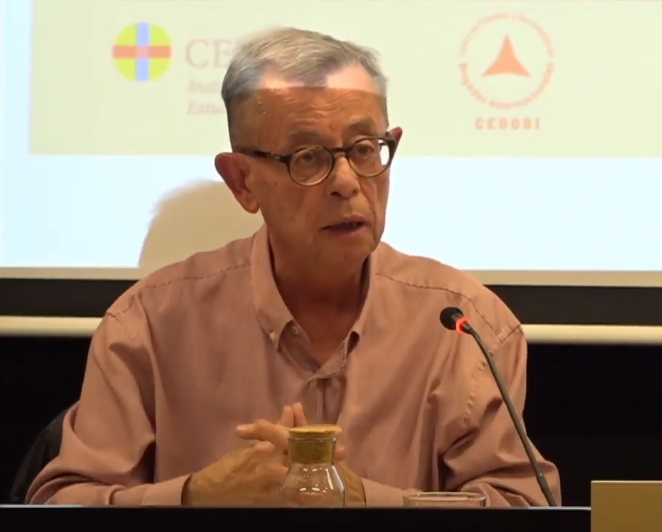
- Born: 1949; Madrid
- Alma mater: Complutense University of Madrid
- Occupation: University teacher
- Employer: Charles III University of Madrid (2003–); Complutense University of Madrid (1977–2003)
- Position held: professor (1992–)

Ángel Bahamonde Magro (born 1949) is a Spanish historian. He is professor of Contemporary History at the Charles III University of Madrid (UC3M).

== Biography ==
Born in Madrid in 1949, he earned a PhD in history from the Complutense University of Madrid (UCM), reading a dissertation titled El horizonte económico de la burguesía isabelina. Madrid 1856-1866, supervised by José María Jover. In 1992, he was appointed to a chair in the area of "Contemporary History" at the UCM. He moved to the UC3M in 2003. Prior to that he was also a lecturer at Toulouse-Le Mirail and Paris-Saint Denis.

He has worked on the research topics of the social history of cities during the 19th century, history of communications and their role in the modern Spanish state building, the study of the elites in Spanish society, the Spanish Civil War and the intermingling of politics and sport in 20th century Spain.

== Works ==
Author

- — (2002). El Real Madrid en la historia de España. Madrid: Taurus.
- — (2014). Madrid, 1939. La conjura del coronel Casado. Madrid: Cátedra.

Co-author

- Bahamonde, Ángel; Cayuela, José (1992). Hacer las Américas: las élites coloniales españolas en el siglo XIX. Alianza Editorial.
- Bahamonde, Ángel; Martínez, Jesús A. (1994). Historia de España. Siglo XIX. Madrid: Cátedra.
- Bahamonde, Ángel; Martínez, Gaspar; Otero, Luis E. (1997–1998). Historia gráfica de las comunicaciones. Madrid: Posta Española.
- Bahamonde Magro, Ángel; Cervera Gil, Javier (1999). Así terminó la guerra de España. Madrid: Marcial Pons.
- Villares, Ramón; Bahamonde, Ángel (2001). El mundo contemporáneo. Siglos XIX y XX. Madrid: Taurus.
- Bahamonde, Ángel; Sánchez Illán, Juan Carlos (2010). Una república de papel: L'Espagne Républicaine (1945-1949). Madrid: Fondo de Cultura Económica.
