= Central Region Army Group =

Central Region Army Group Grupo de Ejércitos de la Región Central (GERC)
- Military flag of the Popular Army
- Active: 16 April 1938 – 29 March 1939
- Country: Spain
- Branch: Spanish Republican Army
- Type: Army group
- Role: Home Defence
- Engagements: Spanish Civil War: Siege of Madrid; Battle of Guadalajara; Levante Offensive; Merida pocket; Battle of Valsequillo

Commanders
- Notable commanders: General Vicente Rojo Lluch; General José Miaja Menant

Map of Spain in November 1938. In pink the two regions under Republican control.

The Central Region Army Group, Spanish: Grupo de Ejércitos de la Región Central (GERC), was a military formation of the Spanish Republican Army during the last phase of the Spanish Civil War. It gathered the most powerful section of the republican military and would endure until the 1939 surrender. The GERC was under the command of general José Miaja Menant, the Defence of Madrid hero.

== History ==
The Central Region Army Group was established on 16 April 1938 by means of an order of the general Staff of the Popular Republican Army. It sought to reorganize the Republican forces following the disastrous campaigns of the Aragon Offensive and the splitting of the Spanish Republican territory in two by the rebel faction. It was initially named "Group of Armies of the Central-Southern Zone" (Agrupación de Ejércitos de la Zona Centro-Sur) before being renamed as Central Region Army Group. At the time of its establishment it was composed by four armies:

- the Andalusian Army (Ejército de Andalucía),
- the Extremaduran Army (Ejército de Extremadura),
- the Central Army (Ejército del Centro) and
- the Levantine Army (Ejército de Levante),

In total 16 Army corps, 49 divisions and 138 mixed brigades. It also included a Coastal Defence brigade and the two anti-aircraft artillery brigades of the Defensa Contra Aeronaves (DCA).

In June the same year, the Eastern Region Army Group Grupo de Ejércitos de la Región Oriental (GERO) would be established as well. In December 1938 the GERC was scheduled to take part in General Vicente Rojo Lluch's "Plan P", an ambitious project of an offensive campaign in Extremadura that would have taken place at the same time as a disembarkment within the enemy lines in Motril, along with diversionary attacks in other places of Andalusia and the Madrid Front. However, in the face of the opposition of General Miaja and other Republican commanders to the implementation of the whole plan, it was not carried out to its full extent and the only action taken was the Battle of Valsequillo which resulted in failure shortly before having been initiated.

Following the fall of Catalonia in February, on 2 March 1939 President Juan Negrín arranged for a reorganization of the Republican Armed Forces in the Central Zone, decreeing the disbandment of the GERC, as well as a reorganization of the command structure. However, Segismundo Casado's coup that took place a few days later would hinder the implementation of these eleventh-hour measures.

== Structure ==
Army Corps	Divisions	Sectors
Central Army
I Army Corps	1st, 2nd & 69th	Guadarrama - Somosierra
II Army Corps	4th, 7th & 65th	Las Rozas - Usera - Carabanchel
III Army Corps	9th, 15th & 18th	Jarama-Aranjuez
IV Army Corps	14th, 12th, 17th & 33rd	Guadalajara - Montes Universales
VI Army Corps	5th, 10th & 8th	Tajo - Jarama
Fourteenth Guerrilla Army Corps	-	Rear guard
Extremaduran Army
VII Army Corps	36th & 37th	Algodor - Zújar
VIII Army Corps	38th, 63rd & 51st	Zújar - Guadalmellato
Andalusian Army
IX Army Corps	20th, 21st & 54th	Córdoba - Jaén
XXIII Army Corps	23rd & 71st	Granada - Almería
Levantine Army
XIII Army Corps	28th & 65th	Montes Universales - Albarracín
XVI Army Corps	39th & 48th	Levante
XVII Army Corps	19th, 40th & 25th	Levante
XIX Army Corps	64th & 66th	Levante
XX Army Corps	49th & 53rd & C	Levante
XXI Army Corps	68th, 52nd & 6th	Espadán
XXII Army Corps	47th, 70th & 41st	Levante

== See also ==
- Spanish Civil War, 1938–39
- Final offensive of the Spanish Civil War
- Eastern Region Army Group Grupo de Ejércitos de la Región Oriental (GERO)

== Bibliography ==
- Alpert, Michael (1989); El Ejército Republicano en la Guerra Civil, Siglo XXI de España, Madrid.ISBN 978-84-323-0682-2
- Engel Masoliver, Carlos (1999); Historia de las Brigadas mixtas del Ejército popular de la República, 1936-1939, Editorial Almena, Madrid, 1999 ISBN 84-96170-19-5.
- Helen Graham (2003). The Spanish Republic at War 1936-1939. Cambridge University Press. ISBN 978-0521459327.
- Salas Larrazábal, Ramón (2006); Historia del Ejército Popular de la República. La Esfera de los Libros S.L. ISBN 84-9734-465-0
- Thomas, Hugh (1976); Historia de la Guerra Civil Española. Círculo de Lectores, Barcelona.ISBN 84-226-0874-X.
