= Extremaduran Army =

Extremaduran Army Ejército de Extremadura
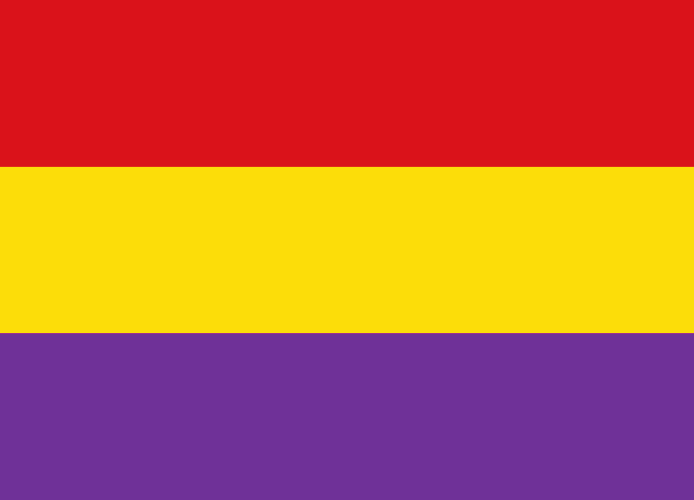
- Military flag of the Popular Army
- Active: 1937–1939
- Country: Spain
- Branch: Central Region Army Group (GERC); Spanish Republican Army
- Type: Field army
- Role: Home Defence
- Garrison/HQ: Almaden
- Engagements: Spanish Civil War Battle of Merida pocket Battle of Valsequillo

Commanders
- Notable commanders: Colonel Adolfo Prada Vaquero

Map of Spain in November 1938. In pink the two regions under Republican control.

The Extremaduran Army (Spanish: Ejército de Extremadura) was a military formation of the Spanish Republican Army during the last phase of the Spanish Civil War. It was part of the Central Region Army Group (GERC). The Republican forces deployed at the Extremaduran Front were under its jurisdiction. They guarded the westernmost end of the Republican territory, an area that saw long periods of inactivity between the major battles.

== History ==
The Extremaduran Army was established in the fall 1937 as a detached formation of the Southern Army (Ejército del Sur) after its disbandment. It was initially led by Lt. Colonel Joaquín Pérez Salas as Commander in Chief, who would be soon replaced by Colonel Ricardo Burillo. The general headquarters were in the town of Almadén.

In July 1938 during the Battle of Mérida pocket the Extremaduran Army suffered heavy losses in human lives and materiel at the hands of the rebel armies. The battle included a swift and well-coordinated pincer movement from the south and from the north. Some historians consider that the long lulls of inactivity at the Extremaduran front had left the troops ill-prepared for such a major attack. Having led the army during the debacle, Colonel Burillo was replaced by Colonel Adolfo Prada Vaquero who was able to somehow regroup the shattered Extremaduran Army and put somewhat of a halt to the Francoist offensive. General Antonio Escobar Huertas took over the command towards the end of 1938.

In January 1939 the Extremaduran Army launched a belated offensive with the Battle of Valsequillo, also known as "Battle of Peñarroya", in the Córdoba-Extremadura front. At the beginning the battle spelt some success for the loyalist side, but it turned to failure after a few weeks of unfruitful combats. Finally, the Extremaduran Army was disbanded in March 1939 owing to the end of the war and the surrender of the Spanish Republic.

== Order of Battle ==
July–August 1938

Army Corps	Divisions	Sectors
VII Army Corps	36th & 37th	Algodor – Zújar
VIII Army Corps	38th, 63rd & 51st	Zújar – Guadalmellato

== Leaders ==
Commanders

- Lt. Colonel Joaquín Pérez Salas (Oct. 1937 - Dec. 1937),
- Colonel Ricardo Burillo (Dec. 1937 - July 1938),
- Colonel Adolfo Prada Vaquero (July 1938 - Oct. 1938)
- Brigadier General Antonio Escobar Huertas (Oct. 1938 - March 1939 ).

Chiefs of Staff

- Lt. Colonel Joaquín Alonso García;
- Lt. Colonel Javier Linares Aranzabe;
- Colonel Eduardo Sáenz de Aranaz;
- Colonel Ramón Ruiz-Fornells;

Commissar

- Nicolás Jiménez Molina, belonging to the PSOE;

Artillery General Commander

- Artillery Colonel José Valcázar Crespo;

Engineering General Commander

- Engineer Lt. Colonel Pedro Fraile Sánchez

== See also ==
- Central Region Army Group Grupo de Ejércitos de la Región Central (GERC)
- Final offensive of the Spanish Civil War

== Bibliography ==
- Alpert, Michael (1989). El ejército republicano en la guerra civil (2nd ed.). Madrid: Siglo XXI de España. ISBN 978-84-323-0682-2.
- Álvarez Rey, Leandro (2010). Los Diputados por Andalucía de la Segunda República, 1931-1939: diccionario biográfico. Vol. II. Seville: Centro de Estudios Andaluces.
- Castillo, Santiago (2011). Historia de la UGT. Un sindicalismo en guerra, 1936-1939. Siglo XXI de España.
- Engel, Carlos (1999). Historia de las Brigadas Mixtas del ejército popular de la República, 1936-1939 (2. rev ed.). Madrid: Almena. ISBN 84-96170-19-5.
- Gallardo Moreno, Jacinta (1994). La guerra civil en la Serena. Badajoz: Diputación provincial de Badajoz.
- Martínez Bande, José Manuel (1981). La batalla de Pozoblanco y el cierre de la bolsa de Mérida. Madrid: Editorial San Martín. ISBN 9788471401953.
- Moreno Gómez, Francisco (1985). La Guerra civil en Córdoba: 1936-1939. Córdoba: Editorial Alpuerto.
- Salas Larrazábal, Ramón (2006); Historia del Ejército Popular de la República. La Esfera de los Libros S.L. ISBN 84-9734-465-0
- Suero Roca, M.ª Teresa (1981). Militares republicanos de la Guerra de España. Barcelona: Ediciones Península Ibérica. ISBN 84-297-1706-4.
- Thomas, Hugh (1976); Historia de la Guerra Civil Española. Círculo de Lectores, Barcelona.ISBN 84-226-0874-X.
- Zaragoza, Cristóbal (1983). Ejército Popular y Militares de la República, 1936-1939. Barcelona: Editorial Planeta.
