= 113th Mixed Brigade =

- 113.ª Brigada Mixta
- Active: March 1937–March 1939
- Country: Spain
- Allegiance: (Second Spanish Republic) Republican faction
- Branch: Spanish Republican Army
- Type: Infantry
- Size: Brigade
- Engagements: Spanish Civil War

Commanders
- Notable commanders: Olegario Pachón Núñez; Ángel Carrasco Nolasco

The 113th Mixed Brigade was a unit of the Spanish Republican Army that participated in the Spanish Civil War, deployed on the Tagus front.

== History ==
The unit was created in March 1937 in the Almagro area, from the recruits of 1936. The 113th Mixed Brigade was assigned to the 36th Division of VII Army Corps, with the idea of its participation in the plan P. The operation, however, was not carried out and instead the brigade was sent to the Toledo front, at the beginning of May, to plug the rupture of that sector due to a nationalist attack. During the rest of the conflict, it did not intervene in any other operation.

In March 1939, the commander of the brigade, the militia major Ángel Carrasco, was dismissed by the Casadista forces as he had remained loyal to the government of Juan Negrín. A few weeks later, after the start of the final offensive, on March 27 the brigade dissolved itself and its forces surrendered to the Army Corps of the Maestrazgo.

== Command ==
Commanders

- Infantry Lieutenant Colonel Francisco Mejide Gunrea;
- Militia major Olegario Pachón Núñez; (Note: Towards the end of the war, the militia major Olegario Pachón commanded the 37th Division.)
- Militia major Gabriel Pareja Núñez;
- Militia major Ángel Carrasco Nolasco;

Commissars

- Pedro Yáñez Jiménez, of the PSOE;
- José Sánchez Hidalgo;

Chiefs of Staff

- Infantry commander Emilio López lbar;

== Bibliography ==
- Engel, Carlos (1999). Historia de las Brigadas Mixtas del Ejército Popular de la República (in Spanish). Madrid: Almena. ISBN 84-922644-7-0.
- Martínez Bande, José Manuel (1981). La batalla de Pozoblanco y el cierre de la bolsa de Mérida (in Spanish). Madrid: Editorial San Martín.
