= 66th Division (Spain) =

60th 66.ª B.Mixta
- Active: 1936–1939
- Country: Spain
- Branch: Spanish Republican Army
- Type: Infantry division
- Role: Home Defence
- Part of: Cuenca Autonomous Group (1936); 3rd Army Corps (1936 - 1938); 8th Army Corps (1938-9).
- Engagements: Spanish Civil War: Battle of Madrid; Battle of Jarama; Battle of Guadalajara; Battle of Extremadura

Commanders
- Notable commanders: Ventura Monge Domínguez ("Félix"); Juan Cerda

Map of Spain in November 1938. In pink the two regions under Republican control.

The 66th Mixed Brigade was a unit of the Popular Army of the Republic that participated in the Spanish Civil War. Born in the context of the Battle of Madrid, took part in the Battle of Jarama and the fronts of Guadalajara and Extremadura.(Spanish: 42.ª División) was a division of the Spanish Republican Army in the Spanish Civil War. This unit was involved in the Battle of Jarama —part of the Battle of Madrid, as well as in the Battle of Peñarroya, suffering grievous losses in both battles.

== History ==
The brigade was officially created on July 29, 1936, while militarizing the Fifth Regiment's militias and those organized in the provinces of Toledo, Cuenca and Guadalajara, being assigned to the latter. Some 800 militiamen of the UGT of Cuenca, Guadalajara and Albacete were also integrated into the brigade (in its 3rd Battalion), placing commanding officers at their command.1 The first commander of the unit was the largest of the captain Ventura Monge, then the war it reaches the jarama was Joaquín Pérez Martín-Parapar; the chief of staff, the militia officer Sánchez; and the political commissar, Ernesto Antuña García. The unit was framed in the 16th Division of the III Army Corps.

The 60th Mixed Brigades, had begun as the reserve. In June the division was made part of Extremadura Operations Army (Spanish: Ejército de Operaciones de Extremadura), which was formed by the 51st.

=== Battles of Jarama ===
In the middle of January 1937 was concentrated in Guadalajara, being prepared for an offensive nonata on Brunete. After being a reserve unit and relay in the defense of Madrid, after a brief rest in the rear, Alcala de Henares and Guadalajara, is mobilized to intervene as a stopper force of the regular forces of Barrón and Buruaga, in the vicinity of La colina of Suicide and white house. With the duties of the battle of Jarama, he was entrusted with the conquest of Pingarrón in the last moments. Intervened in the Battle of Jarama attacking the hill of El Pingarrón on February 19, after winning and losing three times, the unit is decimated and in the front line, then being eliminated a company commanded by Captain Ventura Monge that could only resist in the trenches waiting for a support that will never come, The freedom days after will echo its disappearance.

After this battle, the commander of the Parapar unit was sued for the gross negligence of human losses, as well as an unfavorable report to El Campesino for skipping and disobeying the orders of the high command of Miaja and Rojo. He returned to the front located in the Alto Tajuña, holding heavy combats during the Republican offensive, and the subsequent Francoist counter-offensive, carried out in this area between March 14, March 22, March 31 and April 16, 1938, in that the brigade, coming from the reserve, successfully commissioned the offensive in the central area between April 2 and 6. The combat around the municipalities of Abánades and Sotodosos cost the brigade many losses, The commander of the 261st Battalion, the eldest of militias Juan Molina Aliaga, was discharged for dissensions with his commissar.

On May 15, 1938, the commander of the Infantry Juan Andrés Vivó del Toro, who had been a lieutenant in the Vizcaya Regiment No. 12 of the garrison in Alcoy, assumed command. At that time, the political commissar of the brigade was Bienvenido Hernández García, a member of the PSOE. The 66th Mixed Brigade later returned to the Madrid Front, settling in Villaconejos. In June 1938 he joined the reserve Army Center, in Loeches. The commander Vivó was replaced by the eldest of militias José del Rey Hernández and took over as commissioner Francisco Testiliano.

=== Battle of the Extremadura ===
On July 22, 1938, she was sent to the Extremadura Front, where she joined the Zújar Division, which later became the 51st Division. On August 2 of that year he entered the front line of combat, trying to oppose the Francoist offensive on Cabeza del Buey (Badajoz), without success. It retreated from the Buitrera and Rinconada mountain ranges to the south of the Zújar river. Later he made a counterattack in the sector of Peñalsordo, occupying the vertex of Peña Bermeja, although he did not achieve his goal of occupying the vertices of Almagrera, Peñón and Cabezuela. After this battle he retired to Añora (Córdoba) for its reorganization. While its Division was returning to Levante, the 66th Mixed Brigade remained as a reserve in Extremadura until the end of the Civil War. In February 1939 their commanders were: Commander of the Brigade, Major José del Rey Hernández, 4 political commissar, Francisco Testiliano; commander of the 261st Battalion, Major Juan Molina Aliaga; Commander of the 262nd Battalion, Major Alberto Schemer; commander of the 263rd Battalion, Major El Moreno; Commander of the 264th Battalion, Major Manuel Ortiz.[5]

== Leaders ==
Commanders

- Militia captain of Infantry (July 1936 - March 1937), Ventura Monge Domínguez;
- Militia Major (December 1936 - May 1938), Joaquín Pérez Martín Parapar;
- Comandaer of Infantry Juan Andrés Vivó del Toro (May 1938 – June 1938).
- Militia Major, (June 1938 – March 1939) José del Rey Hernández;

== See also ==
- Mixed Brigades

== Bibliography ==
- Alpert, Michael (1989). El Ejército Republicano en la Guerra Civil. Madrid: Siglo XXI de España. ISBN 978-84-323-0682-2.
- Engel Masoliver, Carlos (1999). Historia de las Brigadas mixtas del Ejército popular de la República, 1936-1939. Madrid: Editorial Almena. ISBN 84-96170-19-5.
- Salas Larrazábal, Ramón (2006). Historia del Ejército Popular de la República. La Esfera de los Libros S.L. ISBN 84-9734-465-0.
- Thomas, Hugh (1976). Historia de la Guerra Civil Española. Barcelona: Círculo de Lectores. ISBN 84-226-0874-X.
