= 91st Mixed Brigade =

Unit of the Spanish Republican Army

- 91.ª Brigada Mixta
- Active: March 1937–March 1939
- Country: Spanish Republic
- Allegiance: (Second Spanish Republic) Republican faction
- Branch: Spanish Republican Army
- Type: Infantry
- Size: Brigade
- Engagements: Spanish Civil War: Siege of Santuario de Nuestra Señora de la Cabeza; Battle of Merida pocket

Commanders
- Notable commanders: Olegario Pachón Núñez

The 91st Mixed Brigade was a unit of the Spanish Republican Army that took part in the Spanish Civil War. Throughout the war, the brigade was present on the Extremadura front, attached to the 37th Division.

== History ==
The unit was created in March 1937, from the troops from 20th Mixed Brigade, as well as the "Extremadura" battalions No. 1 and No. 2, and two battalions that had been created in the Extremaduran town of Campanario. It was under the command of Juan García Pina, with the anarcho-syndicalist Germán Clemente de la Cruz as political commissar. The Brigade was integrated into the 37th Division of the VII Army Corps.

Shortly after its creation, it was sent to participate in the Siege of Santuario de Nuestra Señora de la Cabeza, along with other republican brigades. Then she was sent to the Extremadura front, to participate in "Plan P". During the following months, Juan Bautista Gómez Ortiz and Ignacio López Montilla held command of the brigade, the 91st Brigade held defensive positions, without taking part in military operations.

In July 1938, at the beginning of the nationalist offensive on the Extremadura front, the 91st Mixed Brigade was located opposite of Peraleda del Zaucejo. After the start of the fight, the head of the unit, Ignacio López Montilla, was taken prisoner by the nationalists, having to be replaced by Copérnico Ballester Francés; but Ballester was wounded during the fighting, so the command of the brigade passed to Olegario Pachón Núñez. Around July 20, the 91st MB defended the southern front of the Mérida pocket, in Guareña. After concentrating on La Coronada, on July 23 it tried to reconquer Castuera, without success. The next day it was taken inside the pocket, together with the 20th Mixed Brigade. On July 25, the head of the VII Army Corps authorized the brigade to retreat towards the Zújar river, but the authorization came too late. The brigade was practically destroyed.

== Command ==
Commanders

- Juan García Pina;
- Juan Bautista Gómez Ortiz;
- Ignacio López Montilla;
- Copérnico Ballester Francés;
- Olegario Pachón Núñez;

Commissars

- Germán Clemente de la Cruz, of the CNT;
- Vicente Pastor Vicario;

== Bibliography ==
- Engel, Carlos (1999). Historia de las Brigadas Mixtas del Ejército Popular de la República. Madrid: Almena. ISBN 84-922644-7-0.
- Martínez Bande, José Manuel (1981). La batalla de Pozoblanco y el cierre de la bolsa de Mérida. Madrid: Editorial San Martín.
