= Olegario Pachón Núñez =

Extremaduran anarchist

- Born: 1907; Bienvenida, Badajoz, Extremadura
- Died: 1996 (aged 88–89); Llerena, Badajoz, Extremadura
- Military career
- Allegiance: CNT
- Service: Confederal militias (1936–1937), Spanish Republican Army (1937–1939)
- Units: Pío Sopena battalion (1936–1937), 113th Mixed Brigade (1937), 91st Mixed Brigade (1938), 37th Division (1939)
- Conflicts: Spanish Civil War: Extremadura campaign; Battle of Merida pocket

Olegario Pachón Núñez (1907–1996) was an Extremaduran anarchist.

== Biography ==
He was born in the Badajoz town of Bienvenida in 1907. Born into a peasant family, in his youth he worked in the fields as a day laborer. During the years of the Second Spanish Republic he joined the anarchist movement, forming part of the National Confederation of Labor (Spanish: Confederación Nacional del Trabajo, CNT).

After the outbreak of the Spanish Civil War he joined the confederal militias, fighting on the Extremadura front. He came to command the Pío Sopena battalion, which was deployed on the fronts of Talarrubias and Casas de Don Pedro. Later, he joined the structure of the People's Army of the Republic. During some months of 1937 he was at the head of the 113th Mixed Brigade, which manned the quiet front of the Tagus-Extremadura. He also commanded 91st Mixed Brigade, taking part in the Battle of Merida pocket. Towards the end of the war he was commander of the 37th Division.

Towards the end of the war he fled to Alicante, but upon reaching the port he discovered that there were no boats for the refugees. He was taken prisoner by Franco's forces and imprisoned in the concentration camps of Albatera and Porta Coeli. However, he managed to escape and flee to France. There he managed to establish himself and collaborated with the anarcho-syndicalist organization in exile. During his exile he worked as a cartridge carrier, stevedore and ironer. In 1957 he was sent to Spain as a delegate of the CNT, on a clandestine trip whose mission was to ascertain the state of the CNT structure there. Olegario Pachón himself verified the degree of inactivity of the anarchist organization and made it known to the CNT headquarters in exile. After Franco's death, he returned to Extremadura, where he died in 1996.

== Works ==
- Pachón, Olegario (1979). Recuerdos y consideraciones de los tiempos heroicos: testimonio de un extremeño (in Spanish). Edicion del autor. ISBN 978-84-300-1835-2.

== Bibliography ==
- Engel, Carlos (1999). Historia de las Brigadas mixtas del Ejército Popular de la República. Madrid: Almena. ISBN 84-922644-7-0.
- Herrerín López, Ángel (2004). La CNT durante el franquismo: clandestinidad y exilio (1939-1975). Siglo XXI de España. ISBN 9788432311529.
- Lama, José María (2004). La amargura de la memoria. República y Guerra en Zafra (1931-1936). Badajoz: Diputación Provincial de Badajoz.
- Martínez Lorenzo, César (1969). Les anarchistes espagnols et le pouvoir, 1868–1969. Éditions du Seuil.
- Rafaneau-Boj, Marie-Claude (1995). Los campos de concentración de los refugiados españoles en Francia, 1939–1945. Omega.
- Pecellín Lancharro, Manuel (1980). Literatura en Extremadura (in Spanish). Vol. II. Editorial Universitas. ISBN 9788485583065.
- Vega, Rubén; Serrano, Begoña (1998). Clandestinidad, represión y lucha política. El movimiento obrero en Gijón bajo el franquismo (1937-1962). Ayuntamiento de Gijón.
