= 104th Mixed Brigade =

Spanish Republican Army unit during the civil war

- 104.ª Brigada Mixta
- Active: March 1937–January 1939
- Country: Spain
- Allegiance: (Second Spanish Republic) Republican faction
- Branch: Spanish Republican Army
- Type: Infantry
- Size: Brigade
- Engagements: Spanish Civil War: Aragon Offensive; Catalonia Offensive

The 104th Mixed Brigade was a unit of the Spanish Republican Army created during the Spanish Civil War. Throughout the war it acted on the Extremadura, Aragon and Catalonia fronts.

== History ==
The unit was created in March 1937 in Gandía and Alcoy from replacements from 1932 to 1935. In the training phase the command of the brigade fell to Luis Fernández Ortigosa, later passing to Manuel Santana Izquierdo. Some time later, the 104th Mixed Brigade was integrated into the 36th Division of the VII Army Corps, on the Extremadura front, covering the sector that went from the Algodor River to the town of Covisa.

Shortly after his arrival at the front, Santana defected to the nationalists, being temporarily replaced by Hernando Liñán Castaño, followed by several other commanders. Posted on the front line for several months, it did not get to take part in important military actions; at the end of the year, the 104th Mixed Brigade passed to the general reserve of the Extremaduran Army.

In March 1938, it was sent to the Aragon front, as reinforcement against the Aragon Offensive that had been unleashed on this front. It was added to the recently created Extremadura Division, although once it reached the Caspe-Chiprana sector it had to withdraw along with the rest of the republican units. By March 26, the 104th Mixed Brigade was located in the sector that ran from Benabarre to Tremp. On April 19, it was added to the 24th Division, although shortly thereafter – on April 30 – it was added to the 31st Division. At the beginning of the Catalonia Offensive the 104th Mixed Brigade maintained its positions in Coll de Nargó, although it was soon replaced by the 135th Mixed Brigade; after this, it went to Boixols, where on January 2, 1939, it transferred its positions to the 218th Mixed Brigade. There is no further news about its performance.

== Controls ==
Commanders

- Luis Fernández Ortigosa;
- Manuel Santana Izquierdo;
- Hernando Liñán Castaño;
- Modesto Rodríguez Requena;
- Pascual Saura;
- José Montero Rodelgo;

Commissar

- José López Bobadilla, of the CNT;

== Bibliography ==
- Álvarez, Santiago (1989). Los comisarios políticos en el Ejército Popular de la República (in Spanish). Ediciós do Castro.
- Engel, Carlos (1999). Historia de las Brigadas Mixtas del Ejército Popular de la República (in Spanish). Madrid: Almena. ISBN 84-922644-7-0.
- Martínez Bande, José Manuel (1981). La batalla de Pozoblanco y el cierre de la bolsa de Mérida (in Spanish). Madrid: Editorial San Martín.
- Moreno Gómez, Francisco (1985). La Guerra civil en Córdoba (1936-1939) (in Spanish). Córdoba: Alpuerto.
- Solla Gutiérrez, Miguel Ángel (2010). La República sitiada. Trece meses de Guerra Civil en Cantabria (in Spanish). Santander: Ediciones de la Universidad de Cantabria.
- Zaragoza, Cristóbal (1983). Ejército Popular y Militares de la República, 1936-1939 (in Spanish). Barcelona: Ed. Planeta.
