= Adolfo Prada =

Spanish military officer

- Born: Adolfo Prada Vaquero; 1883; Spain
- Died: 1962 (aged 78–79); Madrid, Spain
- Military career
- Allegiance: (Second Spanish Republic) Spanish Republic
- Branch: Army
- Commands: Division (1936), Army of the North (1937), Andalusian Army (1937), Extremaduran Army (1938), Army of the Centre (1939)
- Conflicts: Spanish Civil War: Second Battle of the Corunna Road; Battle of Santander; Asturias Offensive; Final offensive

Adolfo Prada Vaquero (1883–1962) was a military officer of the Spanish Army. He remained loyal to the Republican government during the Spanish Civil War.

In December 1936, Prada led a division in the Second Battle of the Corunna Road. In August 1937 he led an Army corps in Cantabria, and on August 29 he was appointed supreme commander of the Republican Army of the North (60,000 men), replacing General Gámir. He tried to reorganize the Republican forces and shot three brigade commanders in order to maintain discipline. However, he could not stop the Nationalist offensive against Asturias and on October 18 he fled from Asturias in order to avoid capture by the Nationalists. On 7 November 1937 he was made commander of the newly established Andalusian Army, a post he held until 14 March 1938. Following the disaster of the Battle of Merida pocket he was made commander of the Extremaduran Army on 31 July 1938, replacing Colonel Ricardo Burillo who had been abruptly dismissed.

In March 1939, he supported Casado's coup and was appointed commander of the Army of the Centre. On 28 March, he surrendered to the Nationalists. He was sentenced to prison. He was released years later and died in Madrid in 1962.
