= José Sabín Pérez =

Spanish military personnel

- Born: Carmona, Seville, Andalusia, Spain
- Military career
- Service: Confederal militias (1936-1937); Spanish Republican Army (1937-1939)
- Service years: 1936-1939
- Commands: 77th Mixed Brigade; 33rd Division; 37th Division
- Conflicts: Spanish Civil War: Siege of Madrid

José Sabín Pérez was an Andalusian anarchist militant who served during the Spanish Civil War.

== Biography ==
A native of the Sevillian town of Carmona, he was a bricklayer by profession and a member of the National Confederation of Labor (CNT).

After the outbreak of the Spanish Civil War he joined the confederal militias, operating in the downtown area. Sabín organized the Spartacus battalion with anarcho-syndicalist volunteers, taking part in the defense of Madrid. Later he joined the new Spanish Republican Army.

In February 1937 he was appointed commander of the 77th Mixed Brigade, a newly created unit that guarded the subsector of the University City of Madrid. The brigade was assigned shortly thereafter to the 16th Division. He left this position in April 1937. Between March and June 1938, he served as commander of the 33rd Division, on the inactive Guadalajara front. On 15 August of that year he received command of the 37th Division of the VII Army Corps, which had been profoundly reorganized after the battle of Merida pocket—during which the unit was severely broken. He left command of the division in February 1939.

He was captured by the nationalists at the end of the war and was taken prisoner, passing through the concentration camps of Los Almendros and Albatera, thus as for various prisons. In 1942, he was court-martialled and was sentenced to 30 years in prison.

== Bibliography ==
- Engel, Carlos (1999). Historia de las Brigadas mixtas del Ejército Popular de la República (in Spanish). Madrid: Almena. ISBN 84-922644-7-0.
- Martínez Bande, José Manuel (1981). La batalla de Pozoblanco y el cierre de la bolsa de Mérida (in Spanish). Madrid: San Martín.
- Martínez Reverte, Jorge (2004). La Batalla de Madrid (in Spanish). Crítica.
- Zaragoza, Cristóbal (1983). Ejército Popular y Militares de la República, 1936-1939 (in Spanish). Barcelona: Ed. Planeta.
