= Camp Municipal Verge de Lluc =

- Interactive map of Camp Municipal Verge de Lluc
- Former names: Camp José Sempere
- Location: Mare de Déu de Lluc, Palma, Balearic Islands, Spain
- Coordinates: 39.5978°N 2.6872°E
- Owner: Palma City Council
- Type: Sports field
- Surface: Artificial turf

Construction
- Opened: 10 August 1974; 51 years ago
- Renovated: 2018–2024
- Reopened: 10 July 2024; 23 months ago

Tenants
- CF Verge de Lluc; Baleares sin Fronteras FC; Mallorca Hoquei Club

The Camp Municipal Verge de Lluc is a sports field located in the Mare de Déu de Lluc neighborhood of Palma (Balearic Islands, Spain), inaugurated in 1974 and renovated in 2024. It is currently used for football and field hockey. It is situated in the namesake neighborhood, part of the District of Llevant.

The field has artificial turf and has traditionally hosted official matches for the CF Verge de Lluc. Currently, it is also used by Baleares sin Fronteras FC (football) and Mallorca Hoquei Club (field hockey).

== History ==
The neighborhood, built between 1954 and 1957, still lacked basic infrastructure in the early 1970s, including sports facilities. To address this, the CF Verge de Lluc, the main sports organization in the area, promoted the creation of a football field. The field was built on privately owned land between Alfàbia Street and So Na Dolça Road and was inaugurated on August 10, 1974, as Camp José Sempere, after the then-president of CF Verge de Lluc and key supporter of the initiative. Since then, it has served as the primary sports facility in the neighborhood.

Gradually, the field deteriorated, and by the late 1990s, it was in poor condition. The club's teams stopped competing one by one until activities ceased entirely in 2002. That same year, the Palma City Council acquired the field to rehabilitate it and reopen it as a municipal facility. However, years went by without action.

In May 2018, the first phase of the renovation works began, with the demolition of the outer wall, the stands, and the construction of a new wall. The second phase was delayed and only completed on July 10, 2024, when the field was reopened as an artificial turf facility for football 11, football 7, and field hockey.
