= La Serena Dam and Reservoir =

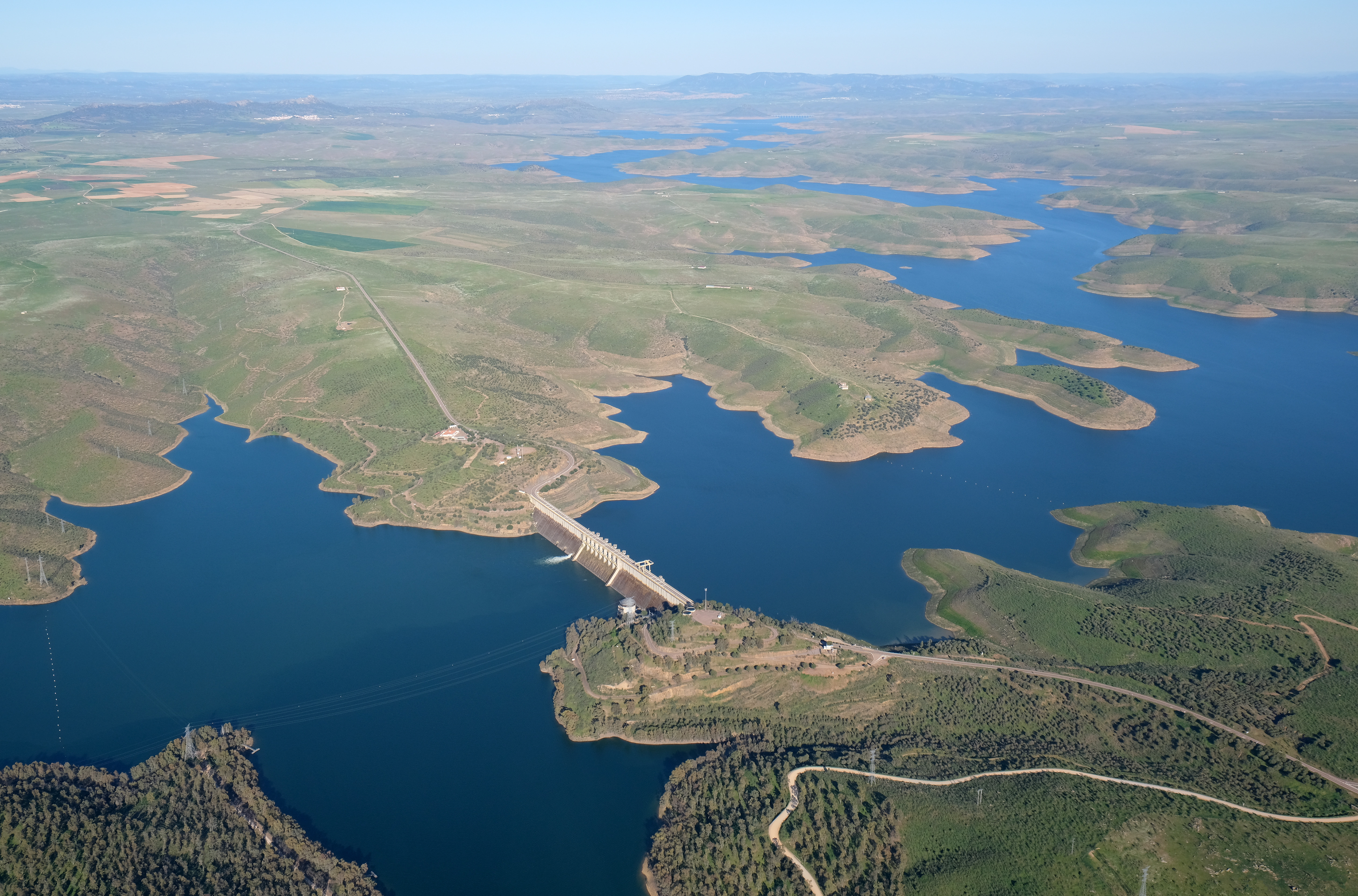
- Interactive map of La Serena Dam and Reservoir
- Country: Spain
- Location: Esparragosa de Lares
- Coordinates: 38.9126°N 5.4135°W
- Opening date: 1989

Dam and spillways
- Type of dam: Gravity dam
- Height (foundation): 91m
- Length: 580m

La Serena Dam and Reservoir (Presa y embalse de La Serena) is a dam and its adjoining reservoir located on the Zújar river, between the municipalities of Castuera and Esparragosa de Lares in Extremadura, Spain.

The operations of La Serena Reservoir were launched in 1989, and those of La Serena Dam in 1990. The dam was inaugurated by the King of Spain Juan Carlos I and Queen Sofía of Spain on 1 February 1990. Manuel Barragán Sebastián was the main engineer overseeing the project.

The gravity dam Serena Dam is 580 metres (634 yards) long and 91 metres (300 feet) high. Its construction required the excavation of 600,000 m^{3} of land. 1,108,000 m^{3} of concrete was used in the construction, a mix planned to resist the region's high summer temperatures.

La Serena Reservoir is part of the river basin of the Guadiana (Cuenca Hidrográfica del Guadiana). With a capacity of 3,219 cubic hectometres (3,219 gigalitres, or 3.219 × 10^{9} cubic metres) and 14,000 hectares of flooded land, it is the second largest natural water reservoir of the Iberian Peninsula, (second to the reservoir of the Alqueva Dam) and Europe's third largest reservoir of water.

The neighboring mining district of Almadén had been the world's main production site of mercury until the turn of the century. Mercury mining started 2000 years ago and 1/3 of the world's mercury (285 000t) was extracted from this region. The mercury mining operations shut down in May 2002. The Valdeazogues River connects the defunct mining area to the reservoir and contains a high mercury (monomethylmercury) level of 7 to 74 μg/g (seasonal variations), while the reservoir's average mercury level is 2 μg/g.

== See also ==
- List of reservoirs in Andalusia
