= Antonio Escobar Huerta =

Spanish military officer (1879–1940)

- Born: Antonio Escobar Huerta; 14 November 1879; Ceuta
- Died: 8 February 1940 (aged 60); Barcelona
- Military career
- Allegiance: (Second Spanish Republic) Spanish Republic
- Branch: Spanish Civil Guard; Spanish Republican Army
- Rank: General
- Commands: Estremadura Army (1938–1939)
- Conflicts: Spanish Civil War: July 1936 military uprising in Barcelona; Battle of Valsequillo; Final offensive of the Spanish Civil War

Antonio Escobar Huerta (14 November 1879 – 8 February 1940) was a Spanish military officer.

== Biography ==
Escobar was a Catholic and a conservative. At the outbreak of the Spanish Civil War, he was a colonel of the Spanish Civil Guard in the city of Barcelona. He remained loyal to the republican government and on 19 July with his 800 men aided decisively to the defeat of the coup in Barcelona. Later he was promoted to General, and in January 1939, he led the Republican forces in the failed Valsequillo Offensive. On 16 February 1939, he was one of the officers who said to the Prime Minister Juan Negrín that further military resistance was impossible. In March 1939, he was the commander of the Extremadura Army, supported Casado's coup and crushed the Communist resistance in Ciudad Real.

On 26 March 1939, he was captured by the Nationalists and executed on 8 February 1940 in Barcelona. He was buried in the Montjuïc Cemetery, Barcelona.

== See also ==
- List of people executed by Francoist Spain
