= Joaquín Pérez Martín Parapar =

Joaquín Pérez Martín-Parapar (1904–1941) was a Spanish railway and military man.

== Biography ==
Joaquín Pérez Martín-Parapar was a railway man by profession, but after the outbreak of the Spanish Civil War, joined the Republican militias. He came to join the PCE Communist Party of Spain. In December 1936 he was appointed commander of the newly created 66th Mixed Brigade. He led this unit in the battle of Jarama, and later in heavy fighting in the area of Esplegares (Guadalajara). According to Carlos Engel, he would also have commanded the 56th Mixed Brigade, reserve unit of the Army of Extremadura.3 In the spring of 1938 he was appointed commander of the 63rd Mixed Brigade, acting on the Levante front and in the Extremadura front; the unit sustained heavy fighting on both fronts.4 On the Extremadura front the 63rd mixed brigade participated in various operations during the year 1938. On April 5, its 250th Battalion attacked Carrascalejo prematurely, which it managed to conquer, but lost it on the 8th due to a nationalist counterattack. As a result of this operation, his boss, Major Blas, was dismissed, and replaced by Joaquín Pérez Martín-Parapar, the eldest of the militias.

The 56th Mixed Brigade was formed in January 1937, in the sub-sector of Almería, under the command of the Joaquín Pérez Martín de Parapar major. Eventually, he led the 66 Mixed Brigade in the Jarama. In December 1937, it became part of the reserve of the Army of Extremadura and was dissolved in April 1938, changing the largest unit.

At the beginning of May, he left for the Levante front, joining the 48th Division of the XVI Army Corps and heading to Segorbe. Since June 11 he was defending the roads of l'Alcora and Vilafamés until the front stabilized. Once stabilized the Levantine front with the beginning of the Battle of the Ebro, returned to Extremadura.

From August 12 to 18, he intervened in an operation on the Alto del Buitre that he conquered and lost again. On December 15, he was appointed to cover the passive front of Hinojosa del Duque, in which he remained successful during the battle of Peñarroya and stayed there until the end of the war.

Captured by the Francoists at the end of the war, as they always did to the one who had successfully confronted them, he was decreed guilty of rebellion armed with the maximum penalty, the execution in the city of Guadalajara in early 1941.

== Bibliography ==
- Martínez Bande, José Manuel (1978). La Batalla del Ebro. Madrid: ED. San Martín.
- Martínez Reverte, Jorge (2006). La caída de Cataluña. Barcelona: Crítica.
- Salas Larrazábal, Ramón (2006). Historia del Ejército Popular de la República. La Esfera de los Libros.
- Zaragoza, Cristóbal (1983). Ejército Popular y Militares de la República, 1936-1939. Barcelona: Ed. Planeta.
- Comín Colomer, Eduardo (1967). History of the Communist Party of Spain III. Madrid: National Publisher.
- Engel, Carlos (1999). History of the mixed brigades of the People's Army of the Republic. Madrid: Battlement. ISBN 84-922644-7-0.
