= Ventura Monge Domínguez =

Spanish infantry officer

Ventura Monge
- Born: 22 June 1914; Madrid, Madrid, Kingdom of Spain
- Died: 15 May 1937 (aged 22); Jarama, Francoist Spain
- Burial place: Madrid
- Military career
- Allegiance: Kingdom of Spain (1914–1931); Spanish Republic (1931–1939)
- Branch: Army; Spanish Republican Army
- Service years: (1926–1937)
- Rank: captain
- Nickname: "Félix"
- Unit: 66ª Brigade Mixta
- Conflicts: Spanish Civil War: Siege of Madrid; Second Battle of the Corunna Road; Battle of Jarama; Battle of Guadalajara

Ventura Monge Domínguez (22 June 1914 – 15 May 1937) was an infantry officer of the General Staff of the Spanish Republican Army and fought in militias during the Spanish Civil War.

== Early life ==
Ventura was the son of a military veteran of the war in Morocco (1912), and grandson of a veteran of the war in Cuba (1878). Ventura was born in Madrid to a prominent family of distinguished farmers. His ancestor, and grandfather graduated as an agronomist at the University of Salamanca. Encouraged by his father, he wanted to join the army in 1926, but since he could not do it because he was not old enough to study, he had to do it as a cornet. In 1928 he entered the Infantry Academy of NCOs. With the rank of sergeant, he was assigned to the 1st Infantry Regiment. In 1931, with the changing the regimes and king Alfonso XIII of Spain leaving the country, he swears to the flag and the new constitution. As a military man eager to ascend soon he went to the internal study of officers in the infantry weapon to close Manuel Azaña Toledo's academy, leaving in his second lieutenant promotion out of his studies that will reach as a lieutenant. He was promoted to Lieutenant on February 25, 1934.

== Spanish Civil War ==
When the Civil War started (July 1936), as a soldier of the Spanish Republican Army Monge - a devout Catholic - stayed loyal to the Republican Government.

Before the conflict broke out, Ventura Monge had already received direct orders at the headquarters of General Miaja from Madrid. So when the conflict broke out his loyalty was totally unquestionable towards his boss, remaining loyal to the Republican government and was appointed Minister of War.

In December 1936 he was promoted to the rank of captain. Through the efforts he put in his forces, fighting in the defense of the capital of Spain, demonstrating its value in the defenses of Madrid, Morata de Tajuña, and Arganda he was designated head of his battalion of the Forces of Defense commanded by General Jose Miaja, with Vicente Rojo Lluch as chief-of-staff.

During the advancement of the fascists in the vicinity of Madrid, the people of Madrid turned to the defense, some new forces were also created and they were used to plug holes. The 66 mixed brigade that was in training and they formed some components of the fifth regiment and the steel column/ The head of the Madrid Defense Board was created to defend the capital at all costs after the transfer of the Republican government from Madrid to Valencia. Afterwards, his fame as defender increased. As head of the 66 mixed brigade integrated in the center's army, he carried out orders in the main operations developed by the mentioned army, in the battles of Jarama and Guadalajara.

== Return and death ==
In February 1937 he returned to Jarama, where he had grown up, as his parents possessed lands very close to the district of Rivas. Ventura has been considered one of the most prestigious military officers of the Republic, and of the war as a whole. He was respected even by his nationalist opponents.

Ventura Monge died in the front defending himself from the attacks of the Moroccan army corps at the beginning of the second part of the battle of Jarama, at the same time that battle Guadalajara continued. In the Pingarrón mountain, he attacked and received some counterattacks in March 1937 but a few days later he received a deadly attack from the Third Group of Indigenous Regular Forces (Ceuta), assisting them in the first line of combat many Moroccans leaving many badly wounded in the operation, most of the company sent by Captain Monge dying in the trenches was buried in the same place.

In his family as the only male of military age, he could not attend his sister's liaison in 1937, she married the then captain of the assault corps, Santiago Cerezo which had the blood of House of Quiñones.

== Awards ==
On December 11, 1934, Monge was awarded by Niceto Alcala Zamora with the Military Medal of first class, for the courage demonstrated in the rebellion of 1934, saving many soldiers. When he returned to Madrid, after the award and attaining "heroic courage," a crowded neighborhood received him at the Railway Station.
