= Manuel Matallana =

Spanish military officer (1894–1952)

Manuel Matallana Gómez
- Born: 25 December 1894; Madrid, Kingdom of Spain
- Died: 1952 (aged 57); Madrid, Francoist Spain
- Military career
- Allegiance: Kingdom of Spain (1912–1931); Second Spanish Republic (1931–1939)
- Branch: Army
- Service years: 1912–1939
- Rank: General
- Conflicts: Spanish Civil War: Siege of Madrid; Battle of Brunete; Battle of Valsequillo; Final offensive of the Spanish Civil War

Manuel Matallana Gómez (25 December 1894 – 1952) was a Spanish officer and lawyer. He was a high-ranking officer on the Republican side of the Spanish Civil War, although he was covertly working for the opposing Nationalist from late 1937 and possibly earlier. He participated in the coup of March 1939 led by Segismundo Casado against Juan Negrín's government. He was imprisoned by the Nationalists after the war and sentenced to thirty years' imprisonment but was released early in 1941.

== Biography ==
Matallan was born in Madrid on 25 December 1894. A son of an infantry captain, he enrolled in military academy in 1909. In June 1912, after graduating, he received the rank of second lieutenant and was assigned to the 45th "Gravelinas" Infantry Regiment in Cáceres. After briefly serving in the 1st "Inmemorial del Rey" Infantry Regiment in Madrid, he served with the 59th Melilla Regiment in the Rif War, where he received several commendations and earned a Red Cross Medal for Military Merit. He then returned to the Gravelinas Regiment in Badajoz before transferring in 1922 to the Policía Indígena (Indigenous Police) of Ceuta. While there, he enrolled in the Higher War College to attend the courses of the General Staff. He completed his studies and training in 1929, then served in the 15th Division and later in the 15th Brigade, both based in A Coruña. He participated in the suppression Revolution of 1934. He also earned a law degree that year.

Matallana was a member of the General Staff of the 2nd Infantry Brigade in Badajoz when the military rebellion of July 1936 against the Spanish Republican government occurred. Despite being a conservative and a practicing Catholic at the start of the conflict, he supported the Republican government during the Spanish Civil War. He was a member of General José Miaja's and worked under Lieutenant Colonel Vicente Rojo during the Battle of Madrid. His loyalty was doubted by the Popular Front government, so he was not appointed to any major commands until late April 1937, when he was appointed Chief of Staff of the Army of the Center. By the time of the Battle of Brunete in July 1937, he held the rank of colonel and served as Miaja's chief of staff. In April 1938, he was appointed Chief of Staff of the Army Group of the Central Region, again under Miaja. He was promoted to general in September 1938.

By late 1937, Matallana was passing information to the Nationalists. The possibility that Matallana was covertly working for the Nationalists from the beginning of the civil war has also been considered. Matallana claimed during his trial after the war that he had been assisting the Nationalists from early on in the conflict; he stated that he had passed information to the rebels through his brother Alberto, who was a lieutenant colonel in the Civil Guard, and that he had deliberately sabotaged several Republican offensives. He was responsible for the execution of Rojo's plans for the failed Republican offensive in Extremadura in January 1939, which raised more suspicion about his conduct. In February 1939, he said to Prime Minister Juan Negrín that it was impossible to continue the war and in March 1939 he joined Casado's coup against the Negrín government. He sent a map and a report about the positions of major Republican units. After the end of the war, he was detained by the Nationalists. Several important members of the Fifth Column and the Francoist intelligence service testified on his behalf, but he was nevertheless tried and sentenced to thirty years' imprisonment. Within a year, his sentence had been commuted to twelve years for his services to the Nationalists during the war. He was granted parole on 30 May 1941 and pardoned on June 6, although he was still subject to the additional penalties. His efforts to resume service in the army were unsuccessful, and he suffered financial problems before finding work at a construction company. He died in Madrid in 1952.
