= Ángel Carrasco Nolasco =

Spanish politician (1907–1943)

Ángel Carrasco Nolasco (1907 – 11 June 1943) was a Spanish Socialist Workers' Party politician. He fought in the Spanish Civil War on the side of the Second Spanish Republic. After the Nationalist victory, he was executed by the government of Francisco Franco.
