= Ricardo Burillo =

Ricardo Burillo Stholle
- Born: 27 March 1891; Córdoba, Spain
- Died: 21 July 1939 (aged 48); Madrid, Francoist Spain

Ricardo Burillo Stholle (27 March 1891 – 21 July 1939) was a Spanish police and military officer who played an important role during the Spanish Civil War. As the police chief in Barcelona, he was responsible for the repression and dismantling of the POUM in 1937. Throughout the war, he became commander of several military units, such as the 9th Division, the III Army Corps and the Extremaduran Army.

In Franco's historiography, he has been identified as one of the top Republican leaders who was responsible for the murder of the right-wing politician José Calvo Sotelo, an accusation that Burillo always rejected.

== Life ==
Burillo was born in Córdoba on March 27, 1891, within an aristocratic and conservative family. Ricardo Burillo is described by the historian Hugh Thomas as a "leftist, puritanical, anticlerical and romantic aristocrat"

=== Second Republic ===
Burillo entered the army, where he reached the rank of infantry commander. He participated in the Rif War. Once the Second Republic was established, he became part of the Security and Assault Corps. In July 1936, he was commander of the 2nd Assault Group based at the Pontejos barracks, attached to the Ministry of the Interior building – in the middle of Puerta del Sol in Madrid. During the Second Republic period he was an active member of the Republican Anti-Fascist Military Union (UMRA).

On 12 July, he was on duty at the Pontejos barracks when he was surprised by the murder of Lieutenant José del Castillo, an Assault Guard officer who had been killed by Falangist gunmen. Castillo was stationed in the Assault Group led by Burillo and some of Castillo's colleagues clamored for revenge at his funeral, which would eventually lead to the murder of right-wing deputy José Calvo Sotelo. The fact that he is the superior of Lieutenant Castillo and both belong to the same Assault group will leave him touched by suspicions about his participation in or knowledge of the murder of the deputy of the "National Bloc". From then on, for some parties, he will become one of the high-ranking officials of the Republican state responsible for the death of Calvo Sotelo. However, he always denied any connection with the fact. However, for historians such as the Irish Hispanicist Ian Gibson, such an accusation is baseless and totally unfounded.

=== Civil War ===
Once the Civil War began, he remained loyal to the Republican government and at the head of his Assault group, participated in the assault on the Montaña Barracks, which had declared itself in rebellion. Once the uprising in Madrid was controlled, he and his men formed the so-called "Column Burillo" together with numerous militiamen and headed to the Madrid highlands, where they would conquer the Port of Navacerrada. For his participation in these actions, he would be promoted to lieutenant colonel.

Later, he went south, where he participates in the last operations of the Siege of the Alcázar, which until then had all been unsuccessful. Once Toledo fell into revolted hands, Burillo was present in different actions of the Front of the center, trying to put order among the militiamen in his column who were demoralized. Later, he participated with his column in the defense of Madrid. At the end of 1936 his column – which would later be militarized and converted into the 45th Mixed Brigade – left the leadership; He went on to lead the newly created 9th Division. With this unit he will be present in some sectors of the Madrid Front, until February 1937, when the start of a Francoist offensive to the south of Madrid occurs. To stop it, the Republicans organized two defense groups: one of them was under the command of Burillo and depended on the Army of the Center under the command of General Sebastián Pozas.

By this time he began to show open sympathy for the Communists; Some time later he confessed to the President of the Republic, Manuel Azaña, that he was faithful to the Army, the Communist Party and the Masonic Lodge. After the so-called "May Events", he assumed the post of Chief of Police in Barcelona, a position from which he carried out the repression against the POUM, a Trotskyist-oriented party that had participated in the Barcelona riots together with the anarchists of CNT-FAI. Thus, under Burillo's orders, on June 16 the POUM headquarters at the Hotel Falcón was closed and the party's members, including its top leader —Andrés Nin— were arrested on charges of Francoist espionage. Months later, he ceased in this position, returning to military positions.

During 1937, he managed to lead Army Corps III and XXII. On November 24, 1937, he assumed command of the newly created Extremaduran Army. He will be in charge of this unit for a long time, on a front that is hardly distinguished by relevant military actions. However, in the summer of 1938, the Army of the South under the command of General Queipo de Llano reactivated the Extremadura front with several offensives that caused the consecutive collapse of the Republican lines. The Francoist troops will be able to conquer large territories and take a significant number of prisoners, in addition to exposing the ineffectiveness of the Extremaduran Army. Indicated for not having lived up to the circumstances, the military disasters in Extremadura caused his sudden dismissal on July 25.

=== Postwar and Shooting ===
He was taken prisoner by the new Franco regime after the end of the war. Apparently he was arrested in the port of Alicante, where he was with hundreds of Republican refugees trying to escape from Franco's forces. Charged by Franco's courts, he was accused, among other crimes, of being one of those directly responsible for the murder of Calvo Sotelo, something that he would deny from his trial until the day of his death. Judged by a very summary court martial, he was sentenced to three death sentences. He would executed by firing squad in 1940. On his grave, which is located in the Almudena cemetery in Madrid, the date of death is July 21, 1939.

== Bibliography ==
- Alpert, Michael (2013). The Republican Army in the Spanish Civil War, 1936-1939. Cambridge University Press. ISBN 9781107028739.
- Álvarez Fernández, José Ignacio (2007). Memoria y trauma en los testimonios de la represión franquista. Barcelona: Anthropos.
- Arasa, Daniel (2008). Historias curiosas del franquismo. Barcelona: Ediciones Robinbook.
- Bahamonde Magro, Ángel; Cervera Gil, Javier (2000). Así terminó la guerra de España. Madrid: Marcial Pons. ISBN 9788495379092.
- Bolloten, Burnett (1991). The Spanish Civil War: Revolution and Counterrevolution. University of North Carolina Press.
- Cardona, Gabriel (1986). La guerra militar. La guerra de las columnas. Historia 16.
- de Paz Sánchez, Manuel (2004). Militares masones de España: diccionario biográfico del siglo XX. UNED Alzira-Valencia.
- Gibson, Ian (1982). La noche en que mataron a Calvo Sotelo. Argos Vergara.
- Ferrer Benimeli, José Antonio (1996). La masonería en la España del siglo XX. Vol. II. Universidad de Castilla La Mancha. ISBN 9788489492479.
- Martínez Bande, José Manuel (1982). La Marcha sobre Madrid. Madrid: Editorial San Martín.
- Martínez Bande, José Manuel (2007). Los años críticos: República, conspiración, revolución y alzamiento. Madrid: Encuentro. ISBN 978-84-306-0487-6.
- Moreno Gómez, Francisco (1985). "La Guerra civil en Córdoba (1936-1939)". Córdoba: Alpuerto.
- Payne, Stanley G. (2004). The Spanish Civil War, the Soviet Union, and Communism. Yale University Press. ISBN 0-300-10068-X.
- Preston, Paul (2013). El Holocausto Español. Odio y Exterminio en la Guerra Civil y después. Barcelona: Debolsillo.
- Romero Salvadó, Francisco J. (2013). Historical Dictionary of the Spanish Civil War. Scarecrow Press. ISBN 978-0-8108-8009-2.
- Thomas, Hugh (1976). Historia de la Guerra Civil Española. Barcelona: Círculo de Lectores. ISBN 84-226-0874-X.
- Zaragoza, Cristóbal (1983). Ejército Popular y Militares de la República, 1936-1939. Barcelona: Ed. Planeta.

Predecessor: —	Comandante de la Columna Burillo julio - noviembre de 1936	Successor: Antonio Rúbert de la Iglesia
Predecessor: —	Comandante de la 9.ª División diciembre de 1936 - febrero de 1937	Successor: Juan Arce Mayora
Predecessor: —	Comandante del III Cuerpo de Ejército; 4 de marzo - 20 de mayo de 1937	Successor: Armando Álvarez Álvarez
Predecessor: —	Comandante del XXII Cuerpo de Ejército septiembre - noviembre de 1937	Successor: Juan Ibarrola Orueta
Predecessor: —	Comandante del Ejército de Extremadura; 24 de noviembre de 1937 - 25 de julio de 1938	Successor: Adolfo Prada Vaquero

Predecessor: —	Commander of the Column Burillo July - November 1936	Successor: Antonio Rúbert de la Iglesia
Predecessor: —	Commander of the 9th Division December 1936 - February 1937	Successor: Juan Arce Mayora
Predecessor: —	Commander of III Army Corps 4 March - 20 May 1937	Successor: Armando Álvarez Álvarez
Predecessor: —	Commander of XXII Army Corps September - November 1937	Successor: Juan Ibarrola Orueta
Predecessor: —	Comandante del Ejército de Extremadura 24 November 1937 - 25 July 1938	Successor: Adolfo Prada Vaquero
