= Andalusian Army =

- Active: October 1937–March 1939
- Country: Spain
- Allegiance: (Second Spanish Republic) Republican faction
- Branch: Spanish Republican Army
- Size: Field Army
- Part of: GERC (1938-1939)
- Garrison/HQ: Baza
- Engagements: Spanish Civil War

Commanders
- Notable commanders: Segismundo Casado

The Andalusian Army (Spanish: Ejército de Andalucía) was a unit of the Spanish Republican Army that operated during the Spanish Civil War. Under its jurisdiction were the republican forces deployed in Eastern Andalusia.

== History ==
The Andalusian Army was created on 19 October 1937, as a new formation detached from the former Southern Army. It had its headquarters in the Granada town of Baza. Since its creation it was made up of two Army Corps, the IX and the XXIII, which covered the front that ran from the Villa del Río sector to the Mediterranean Sea . However, for most of its existence the army had hardly any outstanding military activity. The Andalusian Army published the newspaper Sur (South) between 1938 and 1939. Throughout its history, it had several commanders, among which are Colonel Adolfo Prada Vaquero and General Domingo Moriones Larraga. Although General Moriones supported the Casado coup towards the end of the war, the Casadistas replaced him with Colonel Francisco Menoyo Baños. The Andalusian Army dissolved itself at the end of March 1939.

== Command ==
Commanders

- Infantry colonel Adolfo Prada Vaquero;
- Colonel of Cavalry Segismundo Casado;
- Brigadier General Domingo Moriones Larraga;
- Colonel of engineers Francisco Menoyo Baños;

Commissar

- Serafín González Inestal of the CNT;

Chiefs of Staff

- Lieutenant Colonel Eugenio Galdeano Rodríguez;

Head of Operations

- Infantry colonel Antonio Gómez de Salazar;

General Commander of Artillery

- Lieutenant Colonel of Artillery Gerardo Armentia Palacios;
- Colonel of artillery José Valcázar Crespo;

General Commander of Engineers

- Lieutenant Colonel of Engineers Manuel Mendicuti Palou;
- Lieutenant Colonel of Engineers Juan Castellano Gállego;

== Order of battle ==
=== April 1938 ===
Army Corps	Integrated divisions	Sector
IX Army Corps	20th, 21st, 54th	Jaen-Granada
XXIII Army Corps	23rd, 71st	Granada-Sierra Nevada

== Bibliography ==
- Alpert, Michael (2013). The Republican Army in the Spanish Civil War, 1936–1939. Cambridge University Press. ISBN 978-84-3230-682-2.
- Álvarez Rey, Leandro; Lemus López, Encarnación (1998). Historia de Andalucía Contemporánea. Universidad de Huelva.
- Checa Godoy, Antonio (1991). Historia de la prensa andaluza. Fundación Blas Infante.
- Engel, Carlos (1999). Historia de las Brigadas Mixtas del Ejército Popular de la República. Madrid: Almena. 84-922644-7-0.
- Moreno Gómez, Francisco (1985). La Guerra civil en Córdoba: 1936-1939. Editorial Alpuerto.
- Reig García, Ramón (2011). La comunicación en Andalucía: Historia, estructura y nuevas tecnologías. Sevilla: Centro de Estudios Andaluces. ISBN 978-84-939078-0-8.
- Romero, Luis (1976). El Final de la guerra. Madrid: Ed. Ariel.
- Salas Larrazábal, Ramón (2006). Historia del Ejército Popular de la República. La Esfera de los Libros. ISBN 84-9734-465-0.
- Thomas, Hugh (1976). Historia de la Guerra Civil Española. Grijalbo.
- Zaragoza, Cristóbal (1983). Ejército Popular y Militares de la República, 1936-1939. Barcelona: Ed. Planeta.
