= 36th Division (Spain) =

Spanish Republican Army unit during the civil war

- 36.ª División
- Active: May 1937–March 1939
- Country: Spain
- Allegiance: (Second Spanish Republic) Republican faction
- Branch: Spanish Republican Army
- Type: Infantry
- Size: Division
- Engagements: Spanish Civil War: Battle of Merida pocket

Commanders
- Notable commanders: José Neira Jarabo

The 36th Division was a military formation belonging to the Spanish Republican Army that fought during the Spanish Civil War. It was deployed on the Extremadura front during the entire war.

== History ==
The 36th Division was created in May 1937, on the Extremadura front. It was assigned to the VII Army Corps, which was located in front of the Tagus River. The division was made up of the 47th, 62nd, 104th and 113th mixed brigades, covering the front from the Algodor River to Castilblanco. During the following months, it did not intervene in relevant operations. At the beginning of 1938, it gave up two of its brigades - the 62nd and 104th - which formed the Extremadura Division.

In July 1938, it took part in the fighting of the Battle of Merida pocket, during which it suffered considerable losses. On 11 August, command was assumed by the militia major José Neira Jarabo, a former electrician of the CNT-FAI, who joined the Division from the dissolved 59th Mixed Brigade. At this time the 36th Division, made up of the 47th, 113th and 148th mixed brigades, was integrated into the VI Army Corps.

At the end of the war, Neira was captured and imprisoned by the Nationalists, who shot him in Madrid's Eastern Cemetery on 26 September 1941.

== Command ==
Commanders

- Antonio Bertomeu Bisquert;
- Francisco Gómez Palacios;
- José Neira Jarabo;

Commissars

- Francisco Gil Vallejo, of the PCE;
- Dionisio Martín Martínez, of the PCE;
- Pedro Yáñez Jiménez, of the PSOE;

== Order of battle ==
Date	Attached Army Corps	Integrated mixed brigades	Battlefront
May 1937	VII Army Corps	46th, 47th, 104th and 113th	Estremadura
December 1937	VII Army Corps	47th, 62nd, 104th and 113th	Estremadura
March 1938	VII Army Corps	47th, 62nd and 113th	Estremadura
30 April 1938	VII Army Corps	21st, 47th and 113th	Estremadura
July 1938	VII Army Corps	47th, 113th and 114th	Estremadura
August 1938	VI Army Corps	47th, 113th and 148th	Estremadura
December 1938	VI Army Corps	47th and 113th	Estremadura

== Bibliography ==
- Alpert, Michael (1989). El ejército republicano en la guerra civil (in Spanish). Siglo XXI Editores.
- Álvarez, Santiago (1989). Los comisarios políticos en el Ejército Popular de la República (in Spanish). Ediciós do Castro.
- Engel, Carlos (1999). Historia de las Brigadas Mixtas del Ejército Popular de la República (in Spanish). Madrid: Almena. ISBN 84-922644-7-0.
- Martínez Bande, José Manuel (1975). La llegada al mar (in Spanish). Madrid: Editorial San Martín.
- Martínez Bande, José Manuel (1981). La batalla de Pozoblanco y el cierre de la bolsa de Mérida (in Spanish). Madrid: San Martín.
- Moreno Gómez, Francisco (1985). La Guerra civil en Córdoba (1936-1939) (in Spanish). Córdoba: Alpuerto.
- Núñez, Mirta; Rojas, Antonio (1997). Consejo de guerra: los fusilamientos en el Madrid de la posguerra (1939-1945) (in Spanish). Madrid: Compañía Literaria.
