= Final offensive of the Spanish Civil War =

1939 campaign in the Iberian Peninsula

- Part of the Spanish Civil War
- Map of Spain in February 1939. Republican territory Nationalist territory
Date	Casado's coup: 5–13 March 1939; Final offensive: 26 March – 1 April 1939
Location	Southeastern Spain (provinces of Madrid, Ciudad Real, Cuenca, Albacete, Valencia, Alicante, Murcia, Jaen, Almeria, and parts of Toledo, Guadalajara, Granada and Castellon)
Result	Nationalist victory, end of the war: Dissolution of the Second Spanish Republic and beginning of the Francoist regime

Belligerents
Spanish Republic	Nationalist Spain; Condor Legion (Fascist Italy) CTV

Commanders and leaders
Negrín's Government: (Spain) Luis Barceló (executed) (Spain) Francisco Galán (surrendered); Antonio Ortega (executed) Council of National Defense: Segismundo Casado; Manuel Matallana (surrendered); José Miaja; Cipriano Mera	Francisco Franco; Juan Yagüe; José Solchaga; Rafael García Valiño; Gastone Gambara

Strength
250,000−500,000 men 40 aircraft	1,000,000 men 600 aircraft

Casualties and losses
Casado's coup: 230–2,000 killed Final offensive: 150,000 captured	1,476 killed (sinking of the Castillo de Olite)

The final offensive of the Spanish Civil War took place between 26 March and 1 April 1939, towards the end of the Spanish Civil War. On 5 March 1939, the Republican Army, led by Colonel Segismundo Casado and the politician Julián Besteiro, rose against the socialist prime minister Juan Negrín, and formed a military junta, the National Defence Council (Consejo Nacional de Defensa or CND) to negotiate a peace deal. Negrín fled to France but the communist troops around Madrid rose against the junta, starting a civil war within the civil war. Casado defeated them and started peace negotiations with the Nationalists. Francisco Franco, however, was willing to accept only an unconditional surrender. On 26 March, the Nationalists started a general offensive and by 31 March, they controlled all of Spanish territory. Hundreds of thousands of Republicans were arrested and interned in concentration camps.

== Background ==
=== Fall of Catalonia ===
After the fall of Catalonia in February 1939, the military situation of the Republic was hopeless. Despite still having the capital city and approximately 30% of Spanish territory, it had lost 220,000 soldiers, the second most populated city in the country and the industrial resources of Catalonia. Furthermore, on 27 February, President Manuel Azaña resigned. The United Kingdom and France then recognised the Nationalist government.

=== Military situation ===
The Republican army still had between 250,000 and 500,000 men but only 40 aircraft (three Natasha and two Katiuska bomber squadrons, and 25 Chatos and Moscas fighters), little artillery and few automatic weapons. Many soldiers were unarmed (in December 1938, the Republican army had only 225,000 rifles), and lacked shoes and overcoats. In Madrid, there was food for only two months and no water, heating, medicine or surgical dressings. On the other hand, the Nationalist army had more than a million men at the end of 1938, with 35,000 Moroccans, 32,000 Italians and 5,000 Germans, as well as 600 aircraft.

=== Opposition to continued resistance ===
On 16 February, the high command of the Republican Army told Prime Minister Juan Negrín that further military resistance was impossible. Most of the members of the Republican Army, the PSOE, the UGT and the CNT believed that it was necessary to initiate peace negotiations. Nevertheless, Negrín, backed by the communist PCE, wanted to continue fighting because Franco rejected giving any guarantee against reprisals and a continental war against fascism was believed to be imminent. Furthermore, Negrín wanted to organise the evacuation of those who were most at risk.

== Casado's coup ==
=== Plot ===
From the end of February 1939, Colonel Segismundo Casado had been preparing a coup against the Negrín government to start peace negotiations with the Nationalists, believing that the government was too subordinate to the communists. Colonel José Cendaño, a fifth column agent in the Republican army, promised him that Franco would guarantee the lives of the Republican officers who had committed no crimes. Most noncommunist elements of the Popular Front in Madrid supported the plot, including one of the leaders of the PSOE, Julián Besteiro, because they believed that continuing the war was useless. Furthermore, after the surrender of Menorca, many Republican officers in the central zone believed that they could negotiate a deal with the Nationalists.

On 2 March, Negrín announced a number of new appointments in the Central Zone. Colonel Casado and the communists Juan Modesto and Antonio Cordón García became generals, General Manuel Matallana was appointed as head of the central general staff and communist officers were appointed to command the ports of Murcia (Manuel Tagüeña), Alicante (Etelvino Vega) and Cartagena (Francisco Galán). (according to Beevor, Francisco Galán was appointed military governor of Cartagena, Etelvino Vega governor of Alicante, Leocadio Mendiola commander of Murcia and Inocencio Curto commander of Albacete). The noncommunist elements believed that the communists wanted to control the evacuation harbours and joined the plot against Negrín.

=== Coup ===
On 5 March 1939, Colonel Segismundo Casado, supported by General Matallana, the CNT (Cipriano Mera), the secret service of the Republic (the Military Investigation Service, Servicio de Investigación Militar, or SIM), a section of the PSOE (Julián Besteiro) and a section of the UGT (Wenceslao Carrillo), deposed Negrín and formed a military junta, the National Council of Defence (Consejo Nacional de Defensa) in order to negotiate a peace deal with Franco. On 6 March, Miaja joined the rebellion and was appointed president of the junta. The other members of the junta were Casado, Julian Besteiro, Wenceslao Carrillo, Gonzalez Marín and Eduardo Val (CNT), Antonio Perez (UGT), and the Republicans Miguel San Andrés and Jose del Río.

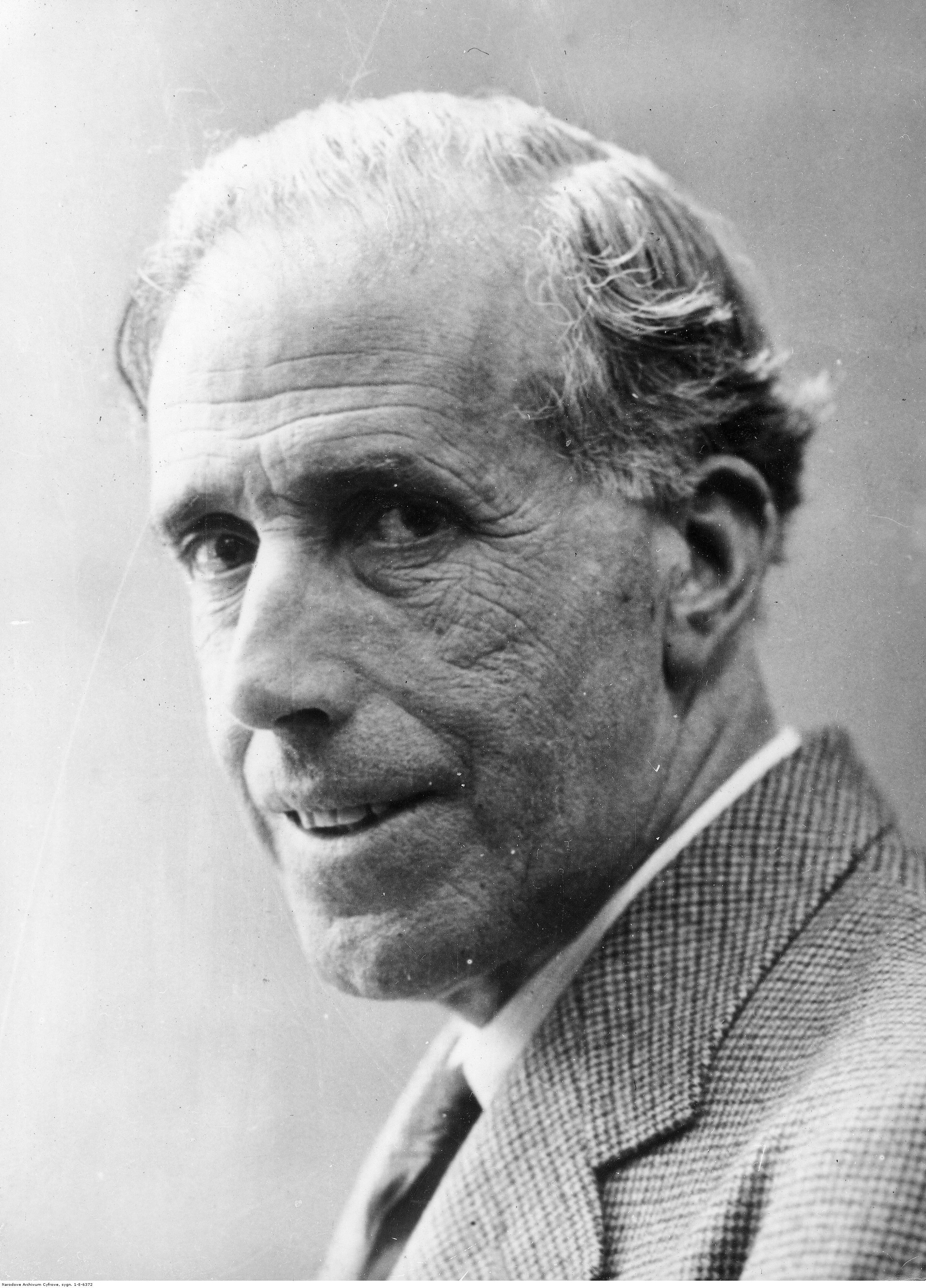
Julian Besteiro, one of the leaders of the PSOE, supported Casado's coup.

Colonel Adolfo Prada was appointed commander of the Army of the Centre, the communist commanders of the I, II and III Army Corps of the Army of the Centre were relieved, the PCE's newspaper Mundo Obrero was closed and Casado ordered massive arrests of communist commissars and militants. Ironically, Casado's justification for the coup was that Negrín and the PCE wanted to carry out a communist takeover, an identical justification to that of the Nationalist uprising, which began the Civil War, but in fact, he rose against the government because he wanted to negotiate peace and believed that removing Negrín and the communists was a precondition to negotiations with Franco. In addition to other assurances, the British government said that Franco would guarantee the lives of the Republicans. Casado had said to the commander of the Republican Air Force, Hidalgo de Cisneros: "I give you my word ... that I can obtain better terms from Franco than Negrín ever can. I can even assure you that they will respect our ranks".

After a failed attempt to negotiate with Casado, Negrín fled to France from the Monòver's airfield, near Elda, with Hidalgo de Cisneros, the leaders of the PCE (La Pasionaria and Vicente Uribe), and the foreign minister Julio Álvarez del Vayo on 6 March to avoid capture by the supporters of Casado (Casado wanted to arrest the government and the PCE's leaders and to hand them over to the Nationalists).

=== Fighting in Madrid ===
Casado's coup was supported by the commanders of the other three armies of the Republican Army (Leopoldo Menéndez López, commander of the Levantine Army; Antonio Escobar, commander of the Extremaduran Army; and Domingo Moriones, commander of the Andalusian Army).
Nevertheless, the army units settled around Madrid and controlled by the PCE (the I corps of the Army of the Centre led by Luis Barceló and the Emilio Bueno's II and Colonel Antonio Ortega's III Corps), rose against the junta on 7 March, starting a brief civil war inside the Republic. Barceló appointed himself as commander of the Army of the Centre, and his troops closed all the entrances to Madrid, occupied most of the city centre and detained and shot three of Casado's colonels. Casado's supporters held only some government buildings and the south-east of the city.

Nevertheless, Cipriano Mera's IV corps counterattacked and occupied Torrejón and Alcalá de Henares as the Nationalists started an offensive towards the Manzanares. By 10 March, Barceló's troops had been surrounded, and a ceasefire was arranged. On 11 March, after days of bloody combat, Casado, backed by the IV corps of Cipriano Mera, defeated Barceló's troops. Barceló and his commissar, José Conesa, were arrested and executed. There were hundreds of dead (Thomas: 230, Jackson: 1,000, and Beevor: 2,000 dead.

=== Cartagena ===
There was also combat in Ciudad Real and Cartagena. In Ciudad Real, Escobar's Extremadura Army crushed the communist resistance led by the deputy Martínez Cárton. Nevertheless, in Cartagena (the main base of the Spanish Republican Navy), where the supporters of Casado, backed by elements of a fifth column, had started the uprising against Negrín's government on 4 March, they were defeated by the PCE's 206th Brigade, of the IV Division, led by colonel Joaquín Rodríguez, after a brief battle on 7 March. Nevertheless, on 5 March, the Republican Navy (three cruisers and eight destroyers), led by Admiral Buiza, had fled to Bizerte after a Nationalist aerial bombardment. One Nationalist transport ship, the Castillo de Olite, sent by the Nationalists in order to support the uprising, was sunk by the coastal batteries of Cartagena, killing 1,476 Nationalist soldiers.

=== Peace negotiations with Franco ===
After the defeat of Barceló's troops, the council tried to start peace negotiations with Franco, hoping to achieve a guarantee against political reprisals. On 12 March, the council proposed a peace deal with a guarantee against reprisals and a period of 25 days to allow anyone who wanted to leave Spain to do so. On 16 March, Franco answered that he would only accept an unconditional surrender. On 23 March, the council sent two negotiators to Burgos (Colonel Antonio Garijo and Major Leopoldo Ortega), and the Nationalists told them that on 25 March, the Republican Air Force had to be surrendered and by 27 March, the Republican troops had to raise the white flag. Nevertheless, on 25 March, the Republicans did not surrender their Air Force because of bad weather and Franco then broke off negotiations with the junta.

== Final offensive ==
On 26 March, Yagüe's troops advanced in Sierra Morena. There was no resistance, and in one day they captured 2,000 km^{2} of land and 30,000 prisoners. The junta ordered its soldiers not to resist the Nationalist advance, and the Republican soldiers threw away their weapons and abandoned the front. By 27 March, the Nationalists were advancing on all fronts without resistance. Solchaga's Navarra Corps, Gambara's CTV and Garcia Valiño's Army of Maestrazgo advanced from Toledo. On 28 March, Colonel Prada, commander of the Army of the Centre, surrendered to the Nationalist troops, who occupied Madrid. Casado and the other members of the junta, except Besteiro, fled to Valencia. On 29 March, the Nationalists occupied Jaén, Ciudad Real, Cuenca, Albacete and Sagunto. 50,000 Republican refugees gathered at the harbours of Valencia, Alicante, Cartagena and Gandia but without the Republican Navy, an evacuation was impossible since the French and British governments refused to organise an evacuation. Only a minority, those who had money to pay for passage, were evacuated by British ships (between 650 and more than 3,500, Casado among them. On 30 March, the Nationalists occupied Valencia and Gambara's troops entered Alicante, rounding up 15,000 Republican refugees. Italian General Gambara was prepared to permit the evacuation of political refugees, but on 31 March, the Nationalist troops arrived and took over jurisdiction from Gambara. As a result, many refugees committed suicide to avoid capture by the Nationalists. On 31 March, the Nationalists occupied Almeria, Murcia and Cartagena, controlling all Spanish territory except for an area of the port of Alicante, where thousands of Republicans expecting evacuation had assembled. They began giving themselves up on 31 March, but the operation was suspended for the night. The last 2000 surrendered the next morning, and approximately 25 committed suicide. By 1 April 1939, the war was effectively over.

== Aftermath ==
On 1 April 1939, the day the war ended, the Soviet Union was the only major power that had not yet recognized Franco's government. The new regime had signed a non-aggression pact with Portugal and a treaty of friendship with Nazi Germany on 31 March, and on 6 April, Franco made public Spain's adherence to the Anti-Comintern Pact. On 20 April, the Non-Intervention Committee was dissolved, and by June, both Italian and German troops had left Spain. The Francoist dictatorship remained in power until Franco's death on 20 November 1975.

Casado remained in exile in Venezuela until he returned to Spain in 1961. Cipriano Mera fled to Oran and Casablanca, but he was extradited to Spain in February 1942. In 1943, he was condemned to death, a sentence that was changed for 30 years in prison; he was set free in 1946 and fled to France, where he died in 1975. Matallana was detained and imprisoned by the Nationalists and died in Madrid in 1956. Besteiro, still at his post in the basement of the Revenue Building at 7 Alcalá Street in Madrid, was arrested by the Nationalists when they entered the city and faced a court martial. Sentenced to 30 years in prison, he died there of an infection that resulted from an injury to his hand in 1940.

The Nationalists arrested hundreds of thousands of Republican soldiers and civilians, with 150,000 soldiers captured in the final offensive, and herded them into makeshift concentration camps. There were between 367,000 and 500,000 prisoners in 1939. In the first years after the war, 50,000 Republican prisoners were executed.

== In literature ==
Casado's coup and the last days of the war are the background of Max Aub's novels, Campo del Moro and Campo de los Almendros.

== See also ==
- List of Spanish Nationalist military equipment of the Spanish Civil War
- List of weapons of the Corpo Truppe Volontarie
- List of Spanish Republican military equipment of the Spanish Civil War
