= Battle of the Merida pocket =

Battle during the Spanish Civil War

Battle of the Mérida pocket
- Part of the Spanish Civil War
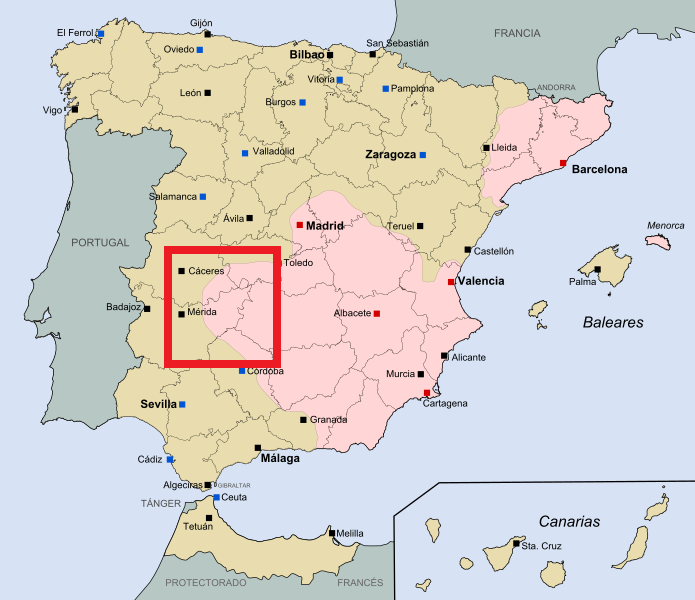
Date	20 – 25 July 1938
Location	Extremadura, Spain
Result	Nationalist victory

Belligerents
Spanish Republic	Nationalist Spain

Commanders and leaders
(Second Spanish Republic) Ricardo Burillo	(Spain) Andrés Saliquet (Spain) Gonzalo Queipo de Llano

Strength
45,000 men	65,000 men

Casualties and losses
6,000 killed, missing, wounded	550 killed, wounded

The battle of the Mérida pocket, also known as the closing of the Mérida pocket (Spanish: Cierre de la bolsa de Mérida), was a military engagement which took place during the Spanish Civil War in July 1938 in La Serena zone of Badajoz Province, Extremadura.

The Nationalist command engineered an offensive which aimed at wiping out a large Republican salient, potentially threatening the only railway line connecting rebel-held León and Andalusia. The Nationalists planned a pincer movement from the north and from the south of the salient. They grouped 7 infantry divisions against 4 divisions of the Republicans. The campaign was carried out successfully during 5 days and with no major battle having been fought. It left one Republican division trapped in the pocket and few others suffering significant losses.

The engagement was neither among the largest battles of the Spanish Civil War nor the one which became a milestone in its history. The Nationalists removed a threat to their logistics and seized some 5,000 square km, though the battle did not turn into a major breakthrough which decided the fate of the conflict. Its relevance was soon eclipsed by the onset of the Battle of the Ebro, which started when the Merida pocket was being closed and which turned into the largest battle of the war. However, the Battle of the Mérida pocket merits attention as a unique example of pincer strategy employed during the war, since most offensives of the conflict were carried out by means of a frontal assault.

== Background ==
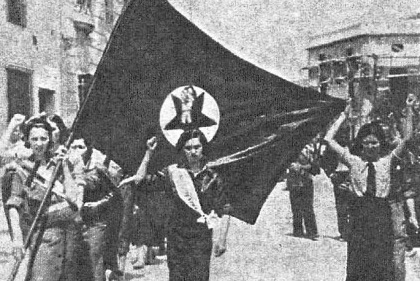
female Republican supporters in Villanueva de la Serena (1936)

Since the summer of 1936 the Republicans controlled a large salient, located in north-eastern part of the Badajoz province, in the region of Extremadura; it covered the comarcas of La Serena, Don Benito and partially La Siberia and Campiña Sur. On the width of some 70 km it projected into the Nationalist-held territory by some 60 km. Total length of the frontlines around the salient was some 200 km and its size was some 5,000 square km. The salient was of little value itself. It was sparsely populated; the largest urban centres were Don Benito (20,000 inhabitants), Villanueva de la Serena (15,000), Campanario (10,000) and Castuera (9,000). The area was of certain importance mostly as an agricultural region of significant grain production. However, it mattered very much from the strategic point of view. It was the westernmost territory, held by the Republic. The frontline was located some 80 km from the Portuguese frontier and some 30 km from Mérida, an important junction with the only railway line connecting the Nationalist-held regions of León and Andalusia. The salient was a constant threat to Nationalist commanders. In case of a successful Republican offensive, the railway connection between Salamanca and Seville would have been broken; in case of an even more successful action, the Nationalist-held territory would have been cut in two. The chief Republican planner, general Rojo, already in May 1937 engineered a scheme, named "Plan P"; it envisioned a massive breakthrough offensive from the salient towards Portugal, but was abandoned due to political, not military reasons. In July 1938 the prime minister Negrín referred to "soldiers of Medellín" - furthermost point of the Republic - when advocating his strategy to keep fighting.

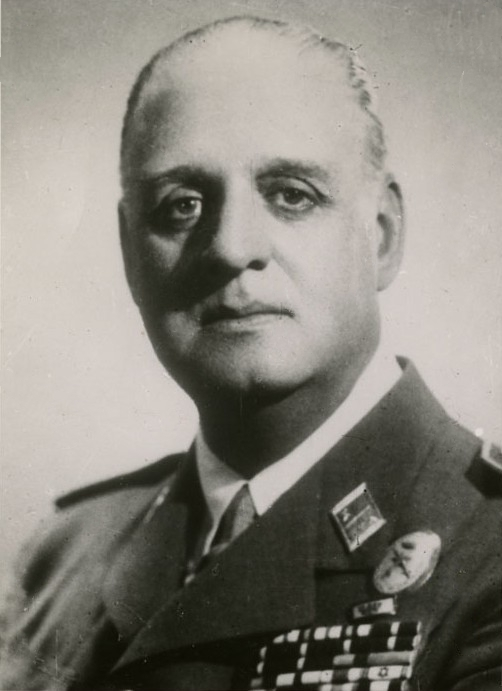
Antonio Barroso

In June 1938 the Nationalists seemed fully in control of the war. In no section of the frontline they appeared endangered or challenged. Having reached the Mediterranean in April in mid-June they have seized Castellón and kept pursuing an offensive along the coast with the objective of taking Valencia. On 17 June lieutenant colonel Antonio Barroso, a high planning officer in Nationalist General Staff, came out with an idea of mounting an offensive which would wipe out the Merida Salient. He devised a plan based on pincer strategy, which would involve parallel attack from the north and the south of the salient, possibly trapping most of the enemy forces in a cauldron. The plan got approved and on 2 July it was incorporated into Instrucción General número 5, issued by the Nationalist high command and signed by Franco. The document acknowledged concentration of Republican troops in Maestrazgo and Levante, which presumably was carried out at the expense of other sections of the front, including Extremadura. It ordered a concentric offensive from the north and from the south; its objectives were doing away with the Merida salient, seizing the Merida-Almorchón railway line (which would provide the Nationalists with the second rail connection to Andalusia), and gaining position for a future offensive towards the province of Ciudad Real. The Nationalist command was not aware that in early July Ejército Popular was gearing up for the largest so far offensive of the war, to be commenced 600 km away; in late July it would begin as the Battle of the Ebro.

== Ordre de Bataille ==
=== Nationalists ===
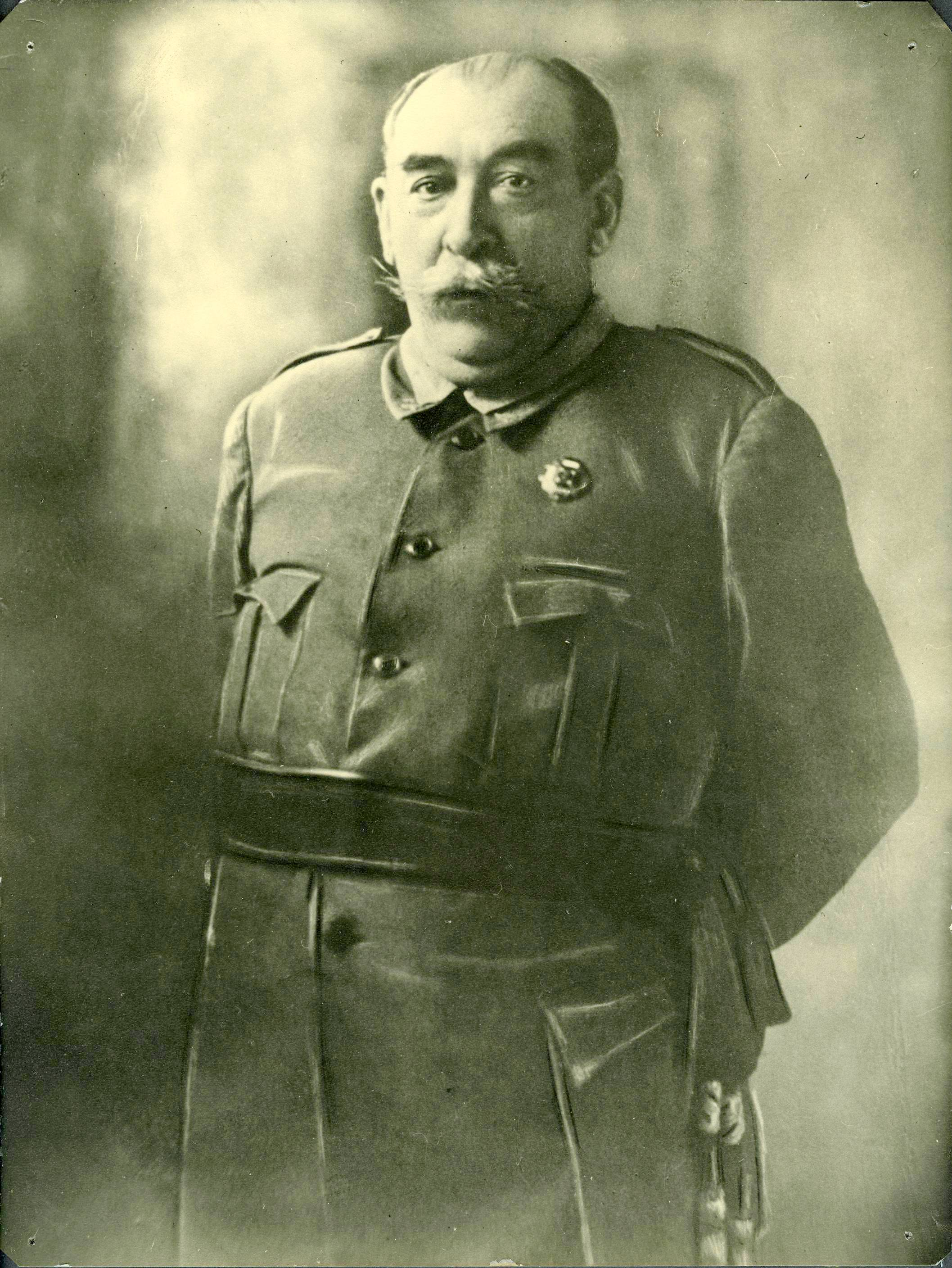
Andrés Saliquet
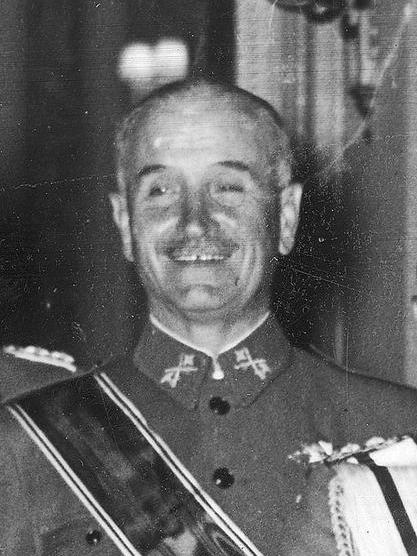
Gonzalo Queipo de Llano

The Nationalist units marked for taking part in the offensive formed part of two armies:

- in the north it was Ejército del Centro, commanded by general Andrés Saliquet. The units selected for the offensive were commanded by general Salvador Múgica:
  - 11. Division (right flank, general Maximino Bartomeu)
  - 74. Division (left flank, coronel Pablo Arias)
  - 19. Division (second wave, teniente coronel José Blanco)
  - cavalry brigade (general Rafael Ibáñez de Aldecoa)
  - various reserve units, subordinated to army command
- in the south it was Ejército del Sur, commanded by general Gonzalo Queipo de Llano. The units selected for the offensive were commanded by general Luis Solans:
  - 102. Division (left flank, coronel Antonio Castejón)
  - 112. Division (centre, coronel Manuel Baturone)
  - 122. Division (right flank, coronel Luis Redondo)
  - 22. Division (second wave, commander unclear)
  - cavalry brigade (which included 2 motorised machine-gun squadrons, commander unclear)
  - various reserve units, subordinated to army command

Both groups were to be assisted by some 17 artillery batteries, two squadrons of bomber aircraft (Ju 52 and He 70) and wings of fighter aircraft (CR-32) stationed in Mérida, Badajoz and Trujillo. In total, the Nationalists have grouped troops equivalent to some 25 regiments (some 65,000 people). The soldiers were generally in good spirits and well equipped, though some sub-units have been brought from various frontlines and were new to this combat zone. It is not clear who directed the entire operation; it had no specific code name.

=== Republicans ===
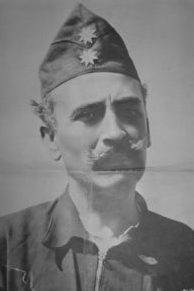
Ricardo Burillo

On the Republican side the salient was garrisoned by Ejército de Extremadura, the army commanded by colonel Ricardo Burillo.

- Most of the salient was within the section assigned to the VII. Corps, commanded by colonel Antonio Rúbert. In the salient it was composed of:
  - 36. Division (which held the section south of the Tagus, slightly north of the salient, teniente coronel Francisco Gómez)
  - 29. Division (on both banks of the Guadiana, facing northern flank of the salient, teniente coronel Fernando Monasterio)
  - 37. Division (facing western flank of the salient, teniente coronel Alejandro Sánchez-Cabezudo)
  - direct reserve, composed of one brigade and other units
- The southern part of the salient was within the operational zone of the VIII. Corps, commanded by colonel Manuel Márquez Sánchez de Movellán. The groups which garrisoned the area were:
  - 38. Division (facing southern flank, major Carlos García Quijada)
  - direct reserve, composed of 68. Division (coronel Justo López Mejías), 12. Brigada de Asalto, 5. Regimiento de Caballería, 2 machine-gun battalions, one penal battalion and an armoured train

In total the Republicans manned the salient with 15 mixed brigades, roughly equivalent to Nationalist regiments (some 45,000 people). Headquarters of Ejército de Extremadura was in Almadén, of the VII. Corps in Cabeza del Buey and of the VIII. Corps in Pozoblanco. There was no direct air support available. Republican soldiers have not seen much combat during 1937 and 1938 and suffered few casualties. However, they spent most of the time in trenches on stationary positions, without much rotation and with almost no leaves; their morale was not high, especially that various units were extracted from the sector and moved elsewhere.

== Battle ==
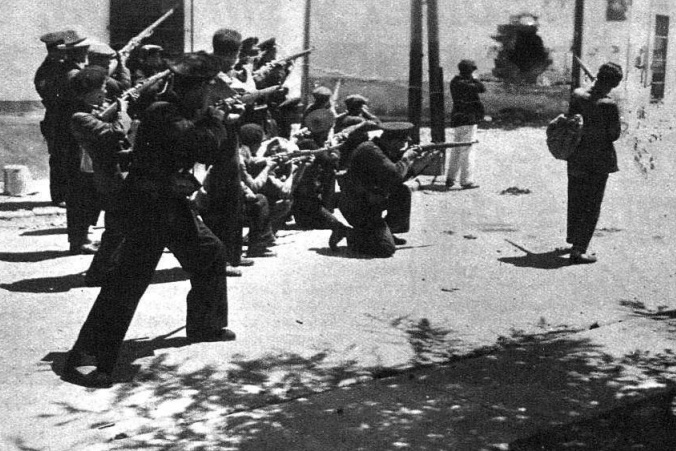
Republican militants, Villanueva

Intelligence services of the Republican Ejército de Extremadura have correctly identified enemy gear-up north of the salient, in Trujillo and Zorita, though they failed to note similar preparations south. Since 16 July the army Boletín de Información was warning about Nationalist preparations, and on 17 July it predicted almost precisely "ofensiva del enemigo en las 48 horas próximas". The anticipated enemy assault was to stretch along a 40-km section from Navalvillar de Pela in the east to Don Benito in the west. In response Burillo ordered state of alert and regrouping of own reserves. On 19 July 1938 the Nationalists opened artillery barrage and mounted an infantry assault on the Republican bridgehead on the Tagus at Puente del Arzobispo, some 100 km from the Merida Pocket and at the extreme right flank of the Ejército de Extremadura. It was engineered as a diversionary attack and it worked; Burillo despatched a brigade from the army reserve to support the defenders. The weather was typical for Extremadura in the summer period: extreme heat made daytime operations very difficult, though on the other hand low waters rendered most rivers relatively easy to cross.

=== 20 July ===
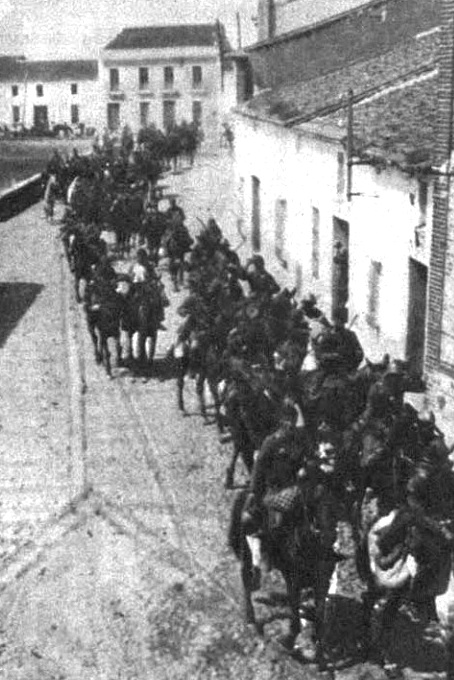
Republicans, La Serena

The actual offensive against the salient began on 20 July with simultaneous actions from the north and from the south. In the north the Nationalist units advanced along the Vivares – Palazuelo – Madrigalejo line. During the day at some points they crossed a minor river Rio Gargáligas, though at some they had to withdraw, the result of the Republicans setting fire to vegetation. On average they advanced some 6–7 km, and seized the villages of Rena, Acedera and Obando; the cavalry performed a 10-km raid on the left flank and seized the place known as Case del Fraile. In the south the Nationalists advanced from Peraleda del Zaucejo, Los Blazquez and Valsequillo, on both banks of the Zujar river. They crossed some minor hilly ranges – culminations of Sijuela and Pícuda - and overran few small settlements, but did not reach any significant town. However, by the end of the day the gap between two pincer groups was reduced to some 60 km. Burillo was primarily concerned about would-be Nationalist takeover of the Almorchón railway junction, gradually within reach of right-wing unit advancing from the south. He started to re-group his units in order to form a makeshift División Zújar, supposed to deliver a counter-attack which would push the Nationalists back.

=== 21 July ===
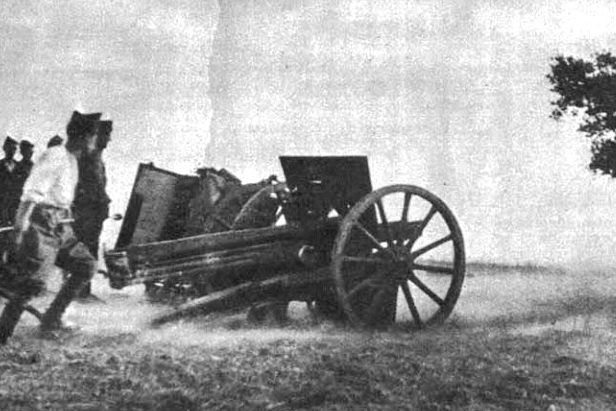
Republican artillery, Extremadura

On 21 July northern divisions of the Nationalists made further moderate progress of some 5–7 km along the 25-km-long breakthrough section, defended by the Republican 29. Division; they advanced well south of Rio Gargáligas. On their left flank they seized Navalvillar de Pela; in the centre they crossed hills known as Sierra de Pela, including the Repica summit, and started to approach Orellana la Vieja and Orellana de la Sierra; on the right flank some units reached northern banks of the Guadiana river. In the south all units cross the upper Zujar, which at that time of the year was no major obstacle either for men or for equipment; in the central part of the breakthrough section they crossed a low range of Sierra del Oro and reached the outskirts of Monterrubio de la Serena. By the end of the day the Nationalist pincers were gradually building a potential cauldron for Republican troops, with the exit gap of some 50 km. However, Burillo contacted commanders of both army corps and demanded that positions be maintained and retreat is performed only on clear orders from the army command; he also contacted general Miaja and asked for 2 brigades of reinforcements.

=== 22 July ===
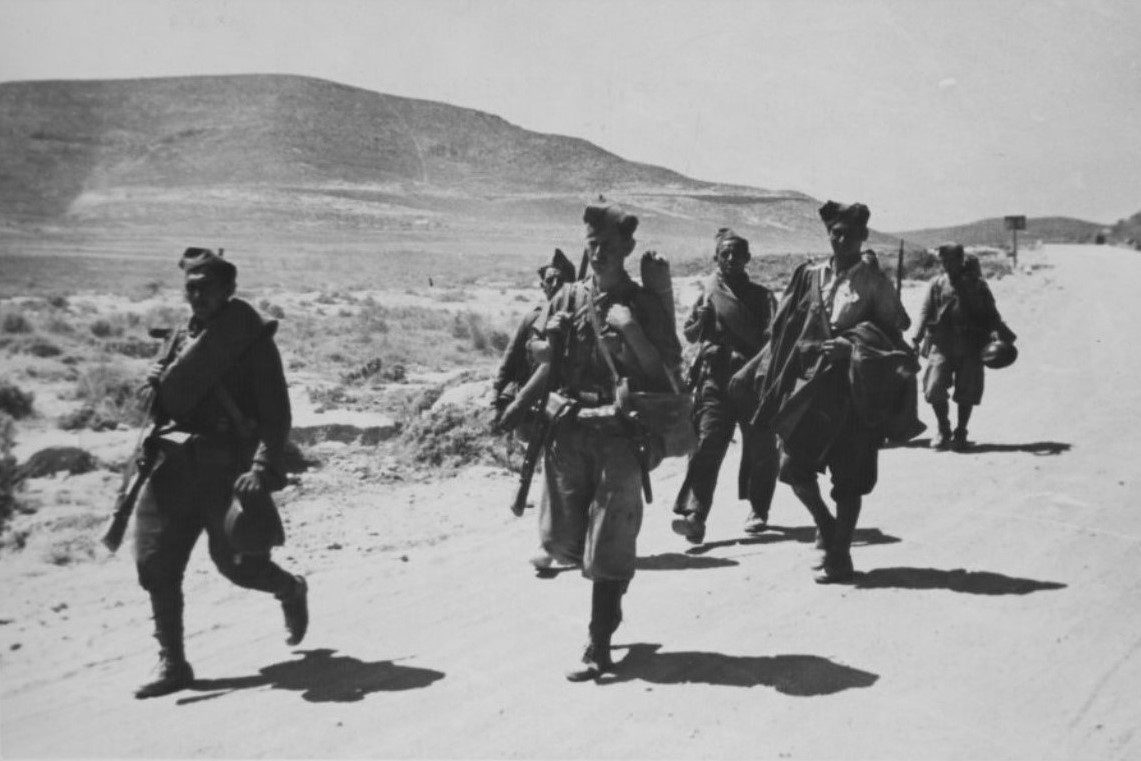
Nationalists in La Serena, July 1938

The day of 22 July was the most challenging one for the northern units of the Nationalists: they had to cross the Guadiana, the only major natural obstacle. The entire advance had been planned few days earlier mostly around possible Guadiana crossings; it turned out that the points chosen, either bridges or fords, were usable, both Orellanas were seized with almost no combat, Republican troops did not offer major resistance, and the Nationalists advanced a few kilometres south of the river. In the south the 112. Division was engaged in first major combat against sub-units of the Republican 38. Division on approaches to Monterrubio; having seized the town, later they had to withstand repeated though somewhat disorganised Republican counter-attacks. The cavalry on the right flank reached the village of Helechal, just 7 km from the Almorchón railway junction. At that point possible encirclement of the Republican 37. Division was already becoming a reality. Both commander and head of staff of the VII. Corps suggested withdrawal, but Burillo did not agree. He trusted in his new División Zújar and in possible reinforcements, even though the exit gap from the pocket was merely some 30 km wide.

=== 23 July ===
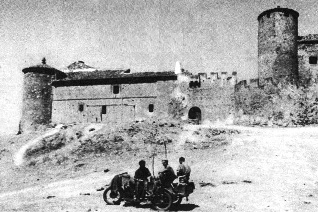
Nationalist patrol at Encomienda

On 23 July the Nationalist northern units focused on their western flank and broadened the breakthrough sector; having changed their axis of advance from south-east to south-west, they seized Castillo de la Encomienda, Entrerríos (between Guadiana and Zújar) and started to approach La Coronada. In the south the 112. Division first resisted renewed night Republican counter-attacks, then crossed a low range of Sierra de Benquerencia and the town of the same name, and during the afternoon hours approached and seized Castuera, reaching the railway line Merida - Almorchón. Instructions from Miaja, despatched late in the day, already reveal that he had little hope of blocking the enemy advance: at the time he was busy tying last knots of the Ebro offensive, which would begin the following day. With the fall of Castuera the exit gap from the Merida Pocket was reduced to some 20 km and it was clear that División Zújar would never become an operational unit, as its points of concentration were getting overran by the enemy. Commander of the VII. Corps, colonel Rubert, has already given his approval (unknown to Burillo) that brigades from the 37. Division might try an orderly withdrawal eastwards.

=== 24 July ===
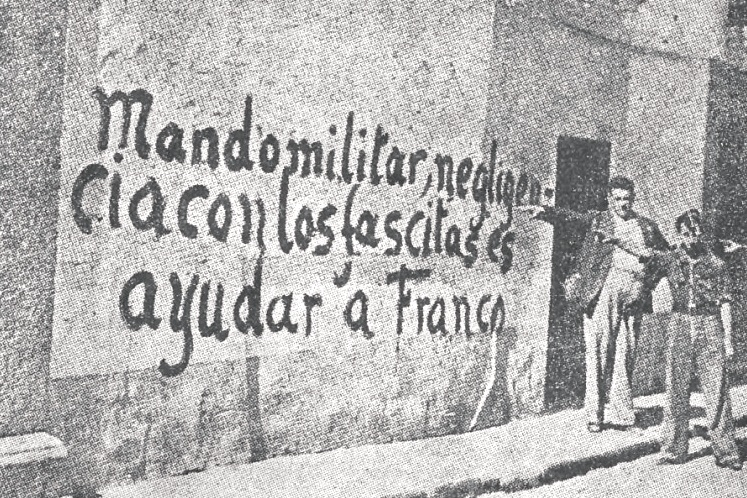
Nationalist supporters in freshly seized town, La Serena

On 24 July the 74. Division, operating east of Villanueva de la Serena, proceeded south-east and seized the towns of Magacela and La Coronada. From then on it was replaced as the spearheading unit by the 11. Division, which proceeded south-east; following few hours, some 7 km march, waddling at numerous points across lower Zújar and with some sporadic combat, it reached Campanario. It is there where it joined the 112. Division advancing from the south, which made some 14 km across fairly easy and undefended area from Castuera on that day. With this encounter the Merida Pocket was closed; during 4 days the northern divisions made some 30 km, the southern ones made some 40 km. Units of the Republican 37. Division which did not manage to withdraw east were now trapped in a kessel. Already in the afternoon local Nationalist commanders wired that "dos batallones rojos" intended to break through, though eventually most of the troops surrendered and there were 1.070 POWs and 2 artillery pieces taken over reported this day. Cavalry units started to patrol the corridor which blocked the pocket from the east, while other Nationalist sub-units were gradually reinforcing the barrier as they were arriving. Burillo – still with his HQ in Almadén - wired Rubert and consented to withdrawal, but at that point the only option east was by means of a breakthrough.

=== 25 July ===
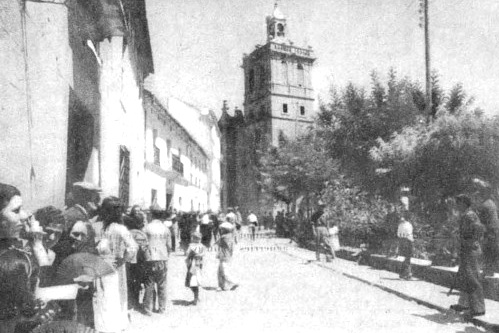
Nationalists distribute food in Villanueva

On 25 July the Republican pocket was now fully encircled; estimates as to its size differ, some authors claim 3,000 square km, and some 500 square km. Its centres were the towns of Don Benito and Villanueva de le Serena, though there were also numerous towns (Quintana de la Serena, Higuera de la Serena, Zalamea de la Serena and others) in the encircled area. Two brigades from the encircled 37. Division, the 20. and 91. ones, attempted a breakthrough south of Campanario and suffered heavy casualties. Eventually all surviving soldiers of Ejército Popular trapped in the pocket surrendered. It is not clear how many of them were taken POWs; official report from Ejército de Extremadura listed 6,100 troops lost, though this probably includes KIA, MIA and POW together. Total casualties (KIA, WIA, MIA) of the Nationalists were at least 550 men; most were suffered by the 102. Division in combat for Sierra de Monterrubio on 22 July. The Nationalists claimed also having seized some 170 machine-guns, 10 tanks, 18 artillery pieces and 19 railway carriages, which served as part of the armoured train, apart from numerous rifles, supplies, munition and other vehicles.

== Aftermath ==
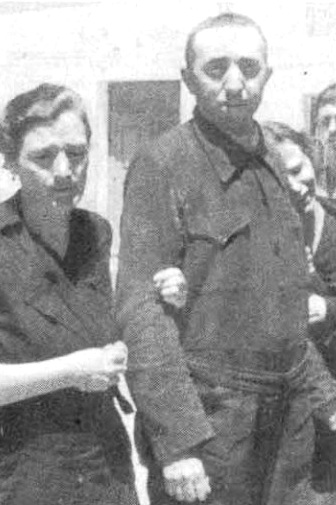
Don Benito, Republican-held prisoner set free

The 5-day Nationalist campaign was highly successful. Its major result was pushing the frontline from 30 to some 80 km away from Mérida and broadening the Badajóz-Mérida corridor (between the Portuguese frontier and Republican-held territory) from 80 km to some 130 km. The offensive seized some 5,000 square km of agriculturally productive territory, wiped out 1 Republican division and significantly reduced the strength of other 3 divisions. However, the operation failed to achieve one of its targets, namely control of the Mérida – Almorchón – Peñarroya railway line; the reason was that the Almorchón junction remained controlled by the Republicans. In August 1938 another Nationalist offensive followed, executed along some 60 km frontline from Casas de Don Pedro in the north to Belalcázar in the south. The fighting was surprisingly heavy and the Republican units mounted resolute and well-organized resistance. It was only following 2 weeks of combat that in mid-August the Nationalists seized Almorchón and Cabeza del Buey; however, they failed to make incursions into the Ciudad Real province. In January 1939 some areas on the southern flank of the former salient, like Peraleda del Zaucejo, will be briefly taken by the last Republican offensive, known as Battle of Peñarroya-Valsequillo.

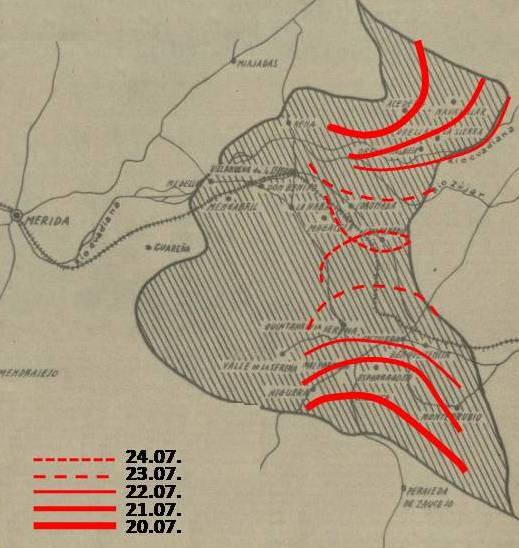
daily frontlines

Following collapse of the Mérida pocket a wave of personal changes in command of Ejército de Extremadura occurred; most of them took place before August 1938. Commander of the VII. Corps coronel Rúbert was dismissed by Burillo; he would not be assigned any major command post, to leave Spain and die in unknown circumstances on exile. Commander of the VIII. Corps coronel Márquez was appointed as his replacement, but later he took command of corps fighting at the Ebro bend and still later in Catalonia; on exile in the USSR, Yugoslavia and Czechoslovakia, in the early 1960s he transferred to revolutionary Cuba, the year of his death is unclear. Coronel Burillo was dismissed from command of Army of Extremadura (and expulsed from the PCE) and performed minor roles, including leading the Madrid police. He joined the Casado Coup but was apprehended by the Nationalists at the quays of Alicante in late March 1939; he was sentenced to death by military tribunal, and then executed in July 1939.

Nationalist commanders proceeded on their career path during and after the war. Most rose to high positions, though Queipo undergone a period of marginalisation; some like Saliquet became heads of military regions. Few individuals, like coronel Baturone (who in the meantime ascended to teniente general), have outlived Francoism and died in the late 1970s.

== See also ==
- Battle of Badajoz (1936)
- Battle of Mérida (1936)
- Battle of Valsequillo (1939)
