= 37th Division (Spain) =

- 37.ª División
- Active: May 1937–March 1939
- Country: Spain
- Allegiance: (Second Spanish Republic) Republican faction
- Branch: Spanish Republican Army
- Type: Infantry
- Size: Division
- Engagements: Spanish Civil War: Battle of Merida pocket

Commanders
- Notable commanders: José Ruiz Farrona; José Sabín Pérez

The 37th Division was a military formation belonging to the Spanish Republican Army that fought during the Spanish Civil War. It was deployed on the Extremadura front during the entire war.

== History ==
The unit was created in May 1937, in the Front of Extremadura. The division, which was made up of the mixed brigades 20th, 63rd, 91st and 109th, was assigned to VII Army Corps. It had its headquarters in Castuera. During the following months, it remained in its positions, without intervening in relevant operations.

In July 1938, it took part in the Battle of Merida pocket, during which he suffered considerable damage. Its 20th and 91st brigades were isolated inside the pocket, suffering heavy losses, although some troops managed to escape the siege. For its part, the 109th Mixed Brigade was completely destroyed, although it was rebuilt later. The division was subjected to a reorganization, with the militia major José Sabín Pérez taking command.

It did not take part in major military operations again.

== Command ==
Commanders

- Lieutenant Colonel Juan Arce Mayora
- Lieutenant Colonel José Ruiz Farrona
- Infantry captain Justo López Mejías
- Infantry commander Alejandro Sánchez Cabezudo
- Infantry commander Antonio Cano Chacón
- Militia major José Sabín Pérez;
- Militia major Donato Sánchez Lueño;
- Militia major Olegario Pachón Núñez;

Commissars

- Benigno Cardeñoso Negrete, of the PSOE;
- Miguel Carnicero, from the PSOE;
- Germán Clemente de la Cruz, from the CNT;

Chiefs of Staff

- Commander Donato Sánchez Muñoz;
- Captain Pedro Tirado Navarro;
- Commander Manuel Luque Molinello;

== Order of battle ==
Date	Attached Army Corps	Integrated mixed brigades	Battlefront
June 1937	VII Army Corps	20th, 63rd, 91st and 109th	Estremadura
March-April 1938	VII Army Corps	20th, 63rd, 91st	Estremadura
July 1938	VII Army Corps	20th, 91st and 148th	Estremadura
July 20, 1938	VII Army Corps	20th, 91st and 109th	Estremadura
August 15, 1938	VII Army Corps	4th, 20th and 109th	Estremadura
October 23, 1938	VII Army Corps	4th, 20th and 109th	Estremadura

== Bibliography ==
- Álvarez Gómez, Santiago (1989). Los comisarios políticos en el Ejército Popular de la República (in Spanish). Ediciós do Castro.
- Engel, Carlos (1999). Historia de las Brigadas mixtas del Ejército Popular de la República (in Spanish). Madrid: Almena. ISBN 84-922644-7-0.
- Martínez Bande, José Manuel (1981). La batalla de Pozoblanco y el cierre de la bolsa de Mérida (in Spanish). Madrid: San Martín.
- Romero García, Eladi (2001). Itinerarios de la guerra civil española: guía del viajero curios (in Spanish).
- Zaragoza, Cristóbal (1983). Ejército Popular y Militares de la República, 1936-1939 (in Spanish). Barcelona: Ed. Planeta.
