= Vicente Rojo Lluch =

Spanish republican general

Vicente Rojo
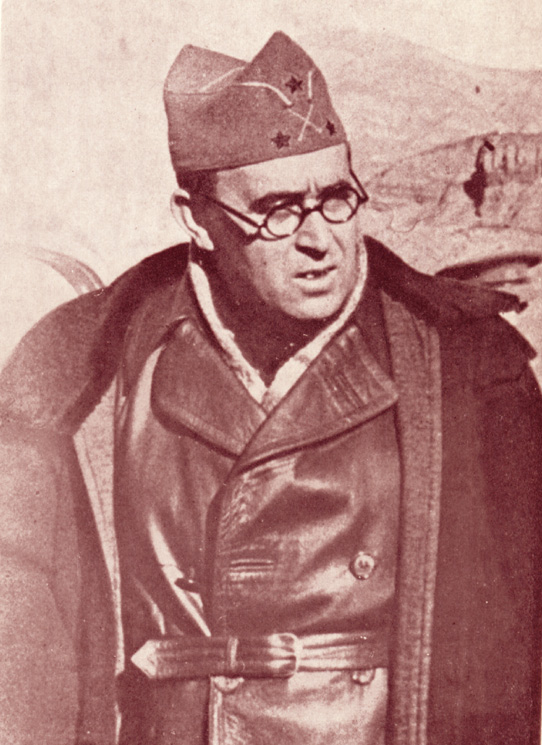
- Born: 8 October 1894; La Font de la Figuera, Spain
- Died: 15 June 1966 (aged 71); Madrid, Spain
- Burial place: San Justo cemetery, Madrid
- Military career
- Allegiance: Kingdom of Spain (1911–1931); Spanish Republic (1931–1939)
- Branch: Spanish Army; Spanish Republican Army
- Service years: 1911–1939
- Rank: General
- Conflicts: Rif War; Spanish Civil War: Siege of Madrid; Battle of Guadalajara; First Battle of the Corunna Road; Second Battle of the Corunna Road; Battle of Jarama; Battle of Ciudad Universitaria; Battle of Belchite; Battle of Brunete; Battle of Teruel; Battle of Ebro; Aragon Offensive; Levante Offensive; Catalonia Offensive
- Awards: Laureate Plate of Madrid

Vicente Rojo Lluch (8 October 1894 – 15 June 1966) was Chief of the General Staff of the Spanish Armed Forces during the Spanish Civil War. He is considered to have been one of the best commanders of the civil war.

== Early life ==
Rojo was born in La Font de la Figuera (Valencia) in 1894. He was the posthumous son of a military man who fought against the Carlists and in the campaigns of Cuba, from where he returned ill.

In 1911 Rojo entered the Infantry Academy at the Alcázar of Toledo, receiving his commission in 1914 with the rank of second lieutenant, fourth in a class of 390 cadets. After having been assigned to Barcelona, he went on to the Group of Regulars from Ceuta (the Regulares were Moroccan colonial troops with Spanish officers). He was later posted back to Barcelona and to La Seu d'Urgell.

In 1922, having risen to the rank of captain, he returned to the Infantry Academy in Toledo, where he occupied diverse educational and administrative positions. He was one of the editors of the curricula on the subjects of "Tactics", "Weaponry" and "Firepower" for the new section of the General Military Academy. In this period at the Academy, he collaborated on the foundation and direction of the Military Bibliographical Collection, along with captain Emilio Alamán.

In August 1932, he left the Academy to enter the Superior War School with the objective to make the course of the General Staff. During his time at the academy, a peculiar event took place in which he proposed to the cadets a tactical assumption that consisted of passing through the river Ebro to establish a route in the Reus-Granadella, an operation very similar to one a few years later, during the civil war, he would later put into practice in the famous Battle of the Ebro in the area between Mequinenza and Amposta. He was promoted to major on 25 February 1936.

== Spanish Civil War ==
When the Civil War started in July 1936, Rojo —a devout Catholic, and linked to the conservative Unión Militar Española— stayed loyal to the Republican government and was one of the military professionals who participated in the reorganization of the Spanish Republican Army.

In October 1936 he was promoted to lieutenant colonel and was designated head of the General Staff of the Forces of Defense commanded by General Jose Miaja, head of the Junta de Defensa de Madrid created to defend the capital at all costs after the transfer of the Republican government from Madrid to Valencia. In this capacity he prepared an effective defense plan for the city that prevented its fall. Afterwards, his fame as an organizer increased. As head of the Central Army HQ, he demonstrated outstanding performance in the planning of the main operations developed by the mentioned Army, in the battles of Jarama, Guadalajara, Brunete and Belchite.

On 24 March 1937 he was promoted to colonel, and after the formation of the Negrín government in May, was made chief of staff of the Armed Forces and chief of staff of the Army. From this new position, he was in charge of directing the expansion of the People's Army, and created the denominated Mobile Army, that served as the offensive advance force of the Republican Army.

On 22 September 1937 he was promoted to the rank of general. Throughout that year he planned the offensives of Huesca, Brunete, Belchite, Zaragoza and Teruel. He was awarded the highest Republican decoration, the "Placa Laureada de Madrid" on 11 January 1938 for his planning of the last mentioned operation.

The most ambitious operation he carried out throughout 1938 was the offensive of the Ebro, a plan that grew from the previously mentioned tactical assumption developed in the Superior War School, that gave rise to the long running battles of the Ebro that developed from 25 July to 16 November 1938. In these battles the Republic gambled its international prestige, its endurance and the possibility of being able to give a favorable turn to the course of the war. In December 1938 he planned an offensive in Andalusia and Extremadura in order to halt the Nationalist offensive against Catalonia, but the generals Matallana and Miaja rejected the plan and the offensive didn't start until January 1939 and failed.

== Exile ==
After the fall of Catalonia, in February 1939, he moved with the government to France, where on 12 February 1939 he was promoted to the rank of Lieutenant General, only the second one in the Republican army.

Prime Minister Juan Negrín sent Rojo several telegrams with instructions to return to Spain. Rojo refused to return, asserting that the war was already lost and that his current responsibility was to care for the refugee soldiers in France. He was joined in this decision by a number of other high-ranking Republican officers. According to Julián Zugazagoitia, a minister in Negrín's government, Rojo stated regarding his refusal, "The only reason for obeying the order to return is the duty of obedience but you surely realize that just because a superior officer orders us to jump out of a window we do not have to do so." Zugazagoitia later wondered whether Rojo's refusal to return could be explained by a passive complicity in the coup d'état being planned by Segismundo Casado, while the Italian communist Palmiro Togliatti viewed Rojo's actions as mere desertion. In his book ¡Alerta a los pueblos! published in 1939 after the end of the civil war, Rojo claimed that he had never received any orders to return.

After a brief stay in France, the Service of Emigration of Spanish Republicans (SERE) paid his passage to Buenos Aires. Between 1943 and 1956 he taught as a professor at the military school of Bolivia.

Rojo has been considered one of the most prestigious military officers of the Republic, and of the war as a whole. His figure was respected even by his Nationalist opponents. The most surprising homage is Francisco Franco's portrayal of him in the film Raza.

== Return to Spain and death ==
In February 1957 he returned to Spain, where most of his family already lived. This return was made possible through a series of negotiations which involved several Nationalist military officers in Madrid, Friar José Luís Almenar Betancourt, a Jesuit who was in contact with him during his stay in Bolivia, and the Bishop of Cochabamba, a former military chaplain who had served under Rojo.

Although he was not bothered in the beginning by the Francoist authorities, on 16 July 1957 the Special Court for the Repression of Masonry and Communism informed him that he would be prosecuted for the crime of military rebellion, in his position as ex-commander of the Army. This was the customary charge for professional military officers who had not joined the rebels in 1936. At his trial, Rojo was asked if he had ever considered joining the rebels. He replied that he had thought about doing so more than once for "sentimental reasons" but remained loyal to the Republic out of a sense of obligation.

He was sentenced to 30 years, but did not serve a single day as the sentence was suspended, and he was soon pardoned. Upon his return to Spain, Rojo was granted by the regime the pension corresponding to a Lieutenant General of the Spanish Army. A number of nationalist officers have publicly said that if Rojo had been allowed to conduct operations without the interference of Soviet officers, the outcome of the war might have been different.

Vicente Rojo died at his home in Madrid on 15 June 1966. Of the obituaries appearing in the Spanish press, only the one in El Alcázar—mouthpiece of the Francoist ex-combatants—and the one by noted Falangist writer Rafael García Serrano in the party press, amply eulogized his military achievements.

He wrote several books detailing his military experiences in the civil war, which were published in the following order: ¡Alerta a los pueblos! (1939), ¡España heroica! (1961) and Así fue la defensa de Madrid (1967).
