= Levante, Spain =

Eastern Iberian coastal region of Spain

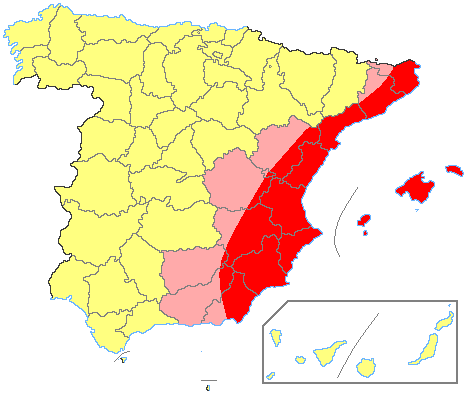
The Levante in Spain

The Levante (Spanish: [leˈβante]; Catalan: Llevant [ʎəˈβan, ʎəˈvant, ʎeˈβan, ʎeˈvant]; "Levant, East") is a name used to refer to the eastern region of the Iberian Peninsula, on the Spanish Mediterranean coast. It roughly corresponds to the former Sharq al-Andalus, but has no modern geopolitical definition. Rather, it broadly includes the autonomous communities of Valencia (provinces of Alicante, Castellón and Valencia), Murcia, Catalonia (Barcelona, Girona and Tarragona), the eastern part of Castile-La Mancha (Albacete and Cuenca), eastern Andalusia (Almería, Granada and Jaén), southern Aragon (Teruel) and the Balearic Islands.

However, in its normal usage, the Levante specifically refers to the Valencian Community, Murcia, Almería, the Balearics and the coast of Catalonia.

Among inhabitants of the Levante, the term is rarely used. Its literal meaning is "the east", and thus makes sense only from the perspective of those who live to the west of Valencia, Catalonia, or the Balearics. However, the Levante does lend its name to a popular regional beer, Estrella Levante, owned by S.A. Damm and produced in Murcia, as well as Levante UD, a Spanish football club in Valencia.

== See also ==
- Levante Offensive
- Levante UD
- Levant (wind), called Levante in Spanish
- Llevant
- Levant

== Bibliography ==
- Robinson, Jancis; Harding, Julia, eds. (2006). The Oxford companion to wine (3rd ed.). Oxford: Oxford University Press. ISBN 978-0-19-860990-2. "Levante, the collective name for four Mediterranean provinces of Spain forming two autonomous regions officially known as Comunitat Valenciana and Región de Murcia."
