= Zújar (river) =

River in Spain

Coordinates: 39°00′N 5°46′W

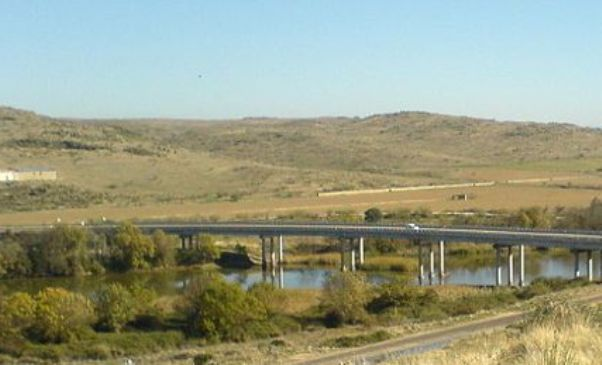
- Bridge of the EX-115 road over the Zújar

Location
- Country: Spain

Physical characteristics
- Source
  - location: Sierra Morena, Andalusia
  - elevation: 733 m (2,405 ft)
- Mouth
  - location: La Serena Dam, Extremadura
  - elevation: 255 m (837 ft)
- Length: 214 km (133 mi)
- Basin size: 8,508 km^{2} (3,285 sq mi)
- Discharge
  - average: 1.93 m^{3}/s (68 cu ft/s)

Basin features
- Progression: Guadiana→ Gulf of Cádiz

The Zújar is a 214 km long river in Spain. It the largest left hand tributary to the Guadiana.

== Course ==
Its source is at La Calaveruela hill in the Sierra Morena near Fuente Obejuna. It flows across Northwestern Córdoba Province and then through the Campiña Sur and La Serena comarcas of Extremadura. Finally it flows into the Guadiana at the La Serena Dam and Reservoir in Villanueva de la Serena.

Its main tributaries are Guadamatilla, Guadalmez, Esteras and Guadalemar, from its right margin; and the Guadalefra on its left margin.

== Vegetation ==
Riparian forests grow along the river. The surroundings are dominated by ash trees. Brambles and tamarisks are found on land, and four-leaf clovers and white waterlilies are found on the water.

== Protection ==
The Special Area of Conservation of the Zújar covers 107.5 kilometers of the river.

== See also ==
- List of rivers of Spain
