= Battle of Valsequillo =

Spanish Military Battle

- Part of The Spanish Civil War
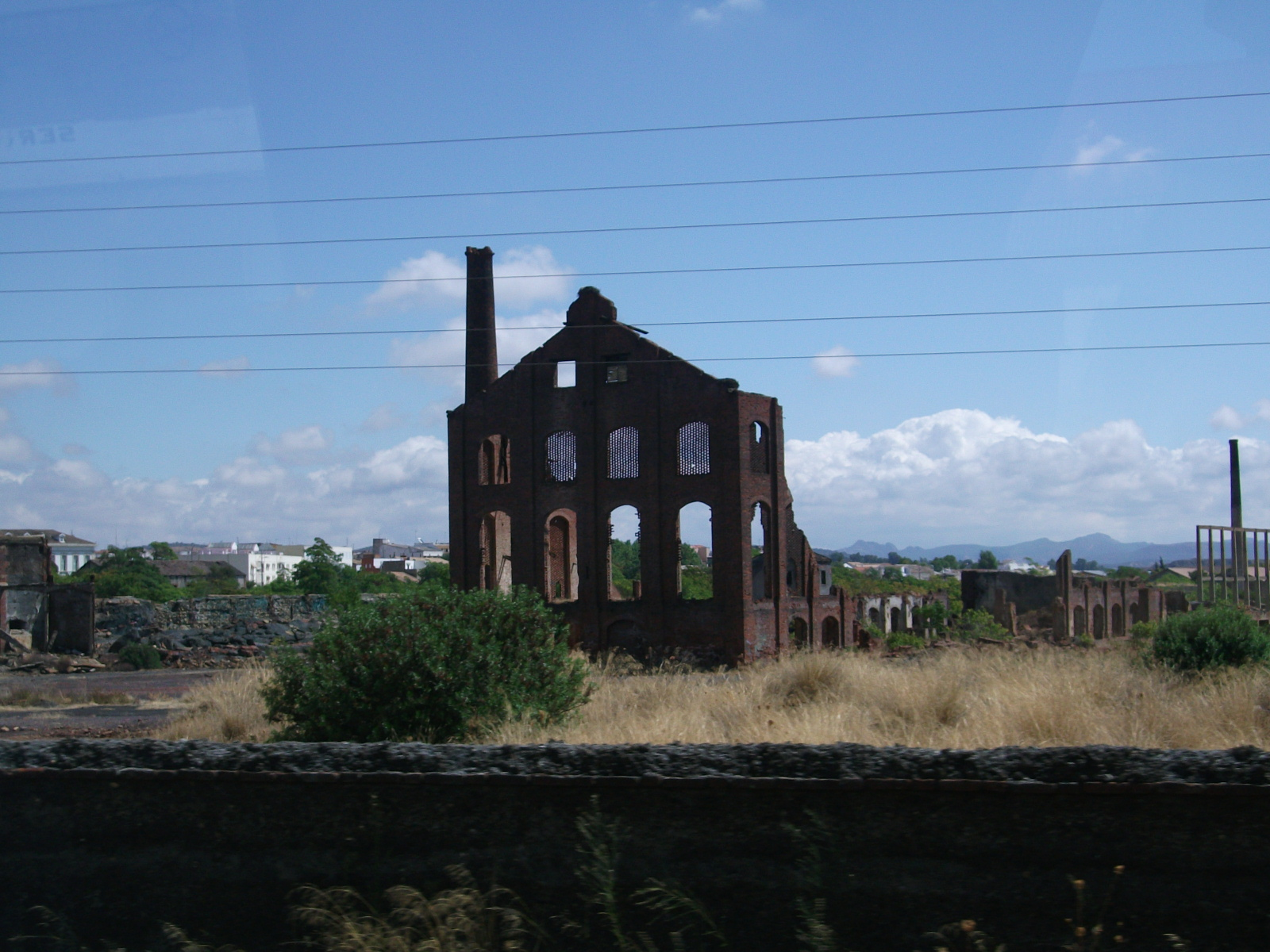
- Buildings of former mining operations in Peñarroya
Date	5 January – 4 February 1939
Location	Extremadura, Spain
Result	Nationalist victory

Belligerents
Spanish Republic	Nationalist Spain

Commanders and leaders
(Second Spanish Republic) Juan Ibarrola (Second Spanish Republic) Manuel Matallana	(Spain) Gonzalo Queipo de Llano

Strength
90,000 men 200 guns 40 tanks	80,000 men 100 guns

Casualties and losses
6,000	2,000

Map of Spain in November 1938

The Battle of Valsequillo, also known as Battle of Peñarroya, was a diversionary Republican offensive which took place in the Sierra Morena area in southern Extremadura and the north of Andalusia between 5 January and 4 February 1939 during the Spanish Civil War. The main goal of the offensive was to distract forces from the Nationalist offensive against Catalonia, but after having occupied 500 square kilometers the Republican advance was stopped and all the territorial gains were lost to a Nationalist counteroffensive.

== Background ==
After the defeat of the Battle of Ebro, the Republican Army was broken and would never recover. The Republicans had lost most of their armament and experienced units. At the beginning of December, the Nationalists concentrated an army of 300,000-340,000 men led by General Davila in order to conquer Catalonia. Then, Vicente Rojo, Commander in chief of the Republican army, decided to launch a diversionary offensive in the central zone in order to divert Nationalists forces from the Nationalist offensive against Catalonia.

=== Plan P ===
In 1937 Vicente Rojo had planned an offensive through Extremadura towards the Portuguese frontier in order to cut in a half the Nationalist held zone; the plan for this offense was code named Plan P. However, the Republican government rejected the plan. In December 1938, Rojo decided to launch the offensive anyway. One Republican army would attack through Extremadura towards Cordoba while one brigade would land at Motril, advance towards Málaga and start an uprising in Andalusia against the Nationalists. The offensive was intended to start on 8 December, but the amphibious assault at Motril was called off just as the troops were ready to leave and the Generals Miaja and Matallana rejected the plan. The Republican offensive on Extremadura did not start until 5 January, after the start of the Nationalist offensive against Catalonia.

== The battle ==
=== Opposing forces ===
The Republicans had assembled the Estremadura Army, to be led by the General Antonio Escobar Huertas. Among its constituent units were with the XXII Corps led by Colonel Juan Ibarrola, consisting of the 47th Division, 70th Division, and the 10th Divisions, the Agrupacion Toral led by the Major Nilamon Toral, consisting of the 6th, 28th and 52nd divisions. Additionally four mixed brigades of infantry and cavalry were attached to the army in a formation referred to as Column F. Despite its size, many of its troops lacked weapons and equipment.

Opposing the Republicans, the Nationalists had seven divisions (10th, 40th, 74th, 81st, 60th, 112th and 122nd divisions) led by General Queipo de Llano.

=== Republican Offensive ===
On 5 January, the XXII Corps began the offensive, breaking the Nationalist lines at Hinojosa del Duque and opening a breach of 8 km long in the Nationalist forces. On 6 January, the Republican forces broke the Nationalist's second line and occupied Fuente Obejuna and on 7 January they occupied Los Blazquez and Peraleda del Zaucejo. But the Republican advance halted before Peñarroya. The Republican offensive was halted by the Nationalists air attacks and the adverse weather conditions causing the Republican tanks to become bogged down in mud. At the time the Republican offensive was halted, it had taken 500 square kilometres of little strategic value.

=== Nationalist counteroffensive ===
On 17 January, the Nationalists began a counteroffensive, retaking Peraleda del Zaucejo on 22 January and Fuente Obejuna on 25 January. By 4 February, the Nationalists had regained all the territory conquered by the Republicans and General Escobar ordered the remaining Republican forces to withdraw.

== Aftermath ==
The offensive was a complete failure. The Republican forces occupied briefly a large territory, but the Nationalist offensive against Catalonia continued and on by February all Catalonia had been occupied by the Nationalists.

== See also ==
- List of Spanish Nationalist military equipment of the Spanish Civil War
- List of Spanish Republican military equipment of the Spanish Civil War
