= Montargull (Artesa de Segre) =

- Village
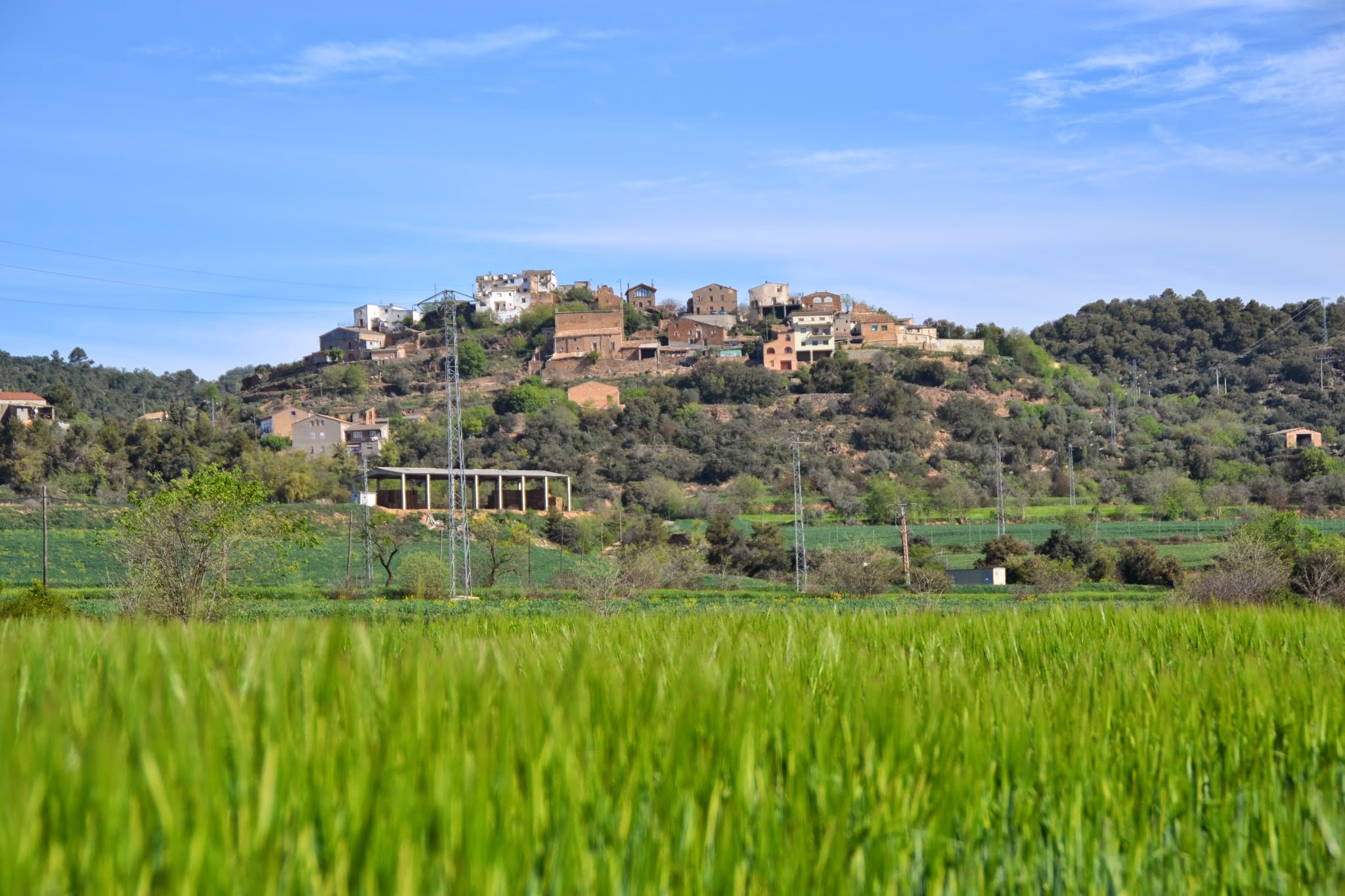
- The Montargull village as seen from the Montargull plain

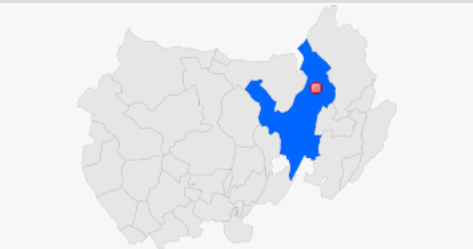
- Map of Artesa de Segre municipality within La Noguera county, Catalonia
- Country: (Spain)
- Autonomous community: Catalonia
- Province: Lleida
- Comarca: Noguera
- Municipality: Artesa de Segre
- Incorporated: 1966

Area
  - Total: 10 km^{2} (3.9 sq mi)
- Elevation: 550 m (1,800 ft)

Population (2013)
  - Total: 43
- Demonym(s): Montargullenc, montargullenca (in Catalan)
- Time zone: Central European Time UTC+01:00
- ZIP code: 25738
- Patronal feast: September, the closest weekend to the "Mercè" (Virgin Mary, "Our Lady of Mercy") festival.

Montargull is a scattered village aggregated to the municipality of Artesa de Segre, at La Noguera county, in Catalonia, Spain. It is located at the highway that goes from Artesa de Segre to the Pallars Jussà county. It got its name due to its location on a hill marking the end of the Serra de Comiols, and the start of a plain known by the same name of the village. On this plain there are crops of wheat and barley, favored by a fairly arid mediterranean weather mildened by the proximity of the mountains. The climate is typical from the mid Segre, with orographic features similar to the Central Depression of Catalonia.

Its history is associated with the history of the Montmagastre barony. In the Middle Ages this barony is merged with the municipality of Anya and, during the 20th century, to the municipality of Artesa de Segre. According to the 2013 Census there were only 43 inhabitants, including the masias of the district. Several vacation homes can be found in the village. Some interesting buildings and landmarks can be found at the district, such as the Santa Maria de Montargull church, nowadays in ruins, prehistorical megaliths and medieval tombs. The building of the old school, closed during the 1960s as a consequence of a school concentration policy of the time, is also preserved. From the upper town a complete view of the Montargull plain can be enjoyed.

== Toponymy ==
The toponymy Montargull, is a hybrid word, with the agglutination of a first part, "mont", coming from the Latin word "mon, montis" which means mountain, and a second part about which there are several theories. A first theory claims that it comes from "argull", deriving from "Hercules" and therefore "mountain of Hercules". A second theory proposes that it corresponds to "ergull", that is "superb", and it would mean "superb mountain" A last theory proposes that "argull" comes from the Arabic خخروف, «arhúl», meaning sheep, and this would imply "sheep mountain", a world to call those places where herds in transhumance would find grazing on their trip to the Pyrenees.

== Geography ==
The village is located at a sector known as the Mid Segre, characterized by not too steep rocks and lands which are similar to the Central Depression. At the foot of the hill where the village is located there is a wide and welcoming valley, belonging to the erosion plains created by the Segre river and its affluents. This allows for a large variety of crops, and in older times there were orchard trips near to the rivers and creeks.

Montargull and the surrounding district have a climate similar to the Segrià, a Mediterranean climate tending to arid, partially mildened by the proximity of the mountains. Mean temperatures at December and January are between 5 °C (41 °F) and 7 °C (45 °F), while during July and August mean temperature is larger than 20 °C (68 °F). Precipitations amount to about 500 mm annually and 130 mm during summer.

The village is constructed over a hill located between the gorges of Montargull and Les Pletes. It marks the end of the Serra de Comiols mountain range and the beginning of the Montargull valley. It is located at the margin of the L-512 highway going from Artesa de Segre to Tremp, and through the Comiols pass. Montargull's district limits north with the Montamagastre and Comiols districts, east with Anya, south again with Montmagastre and west with Vall-llebrera. At the foot of the Montargull gorge the Montargull creek can be found, which later joins the Tòrrec creek and both drain to the Segre.

The original vegetation is formed mainly by oak trees, alternating with thickets of kermes oaks and black hawthorns. There are also thickets of restharrows and Gypsophila struthium. This primitive vegetation has been substituted since there is human presence by crops and by the planting of pine-trees. The main crops are wheat and barley. There are also pork and chicken farms. There is also partridges, wild rabbits and hares hunting.

== History ==
=== Prehistory and old age ===
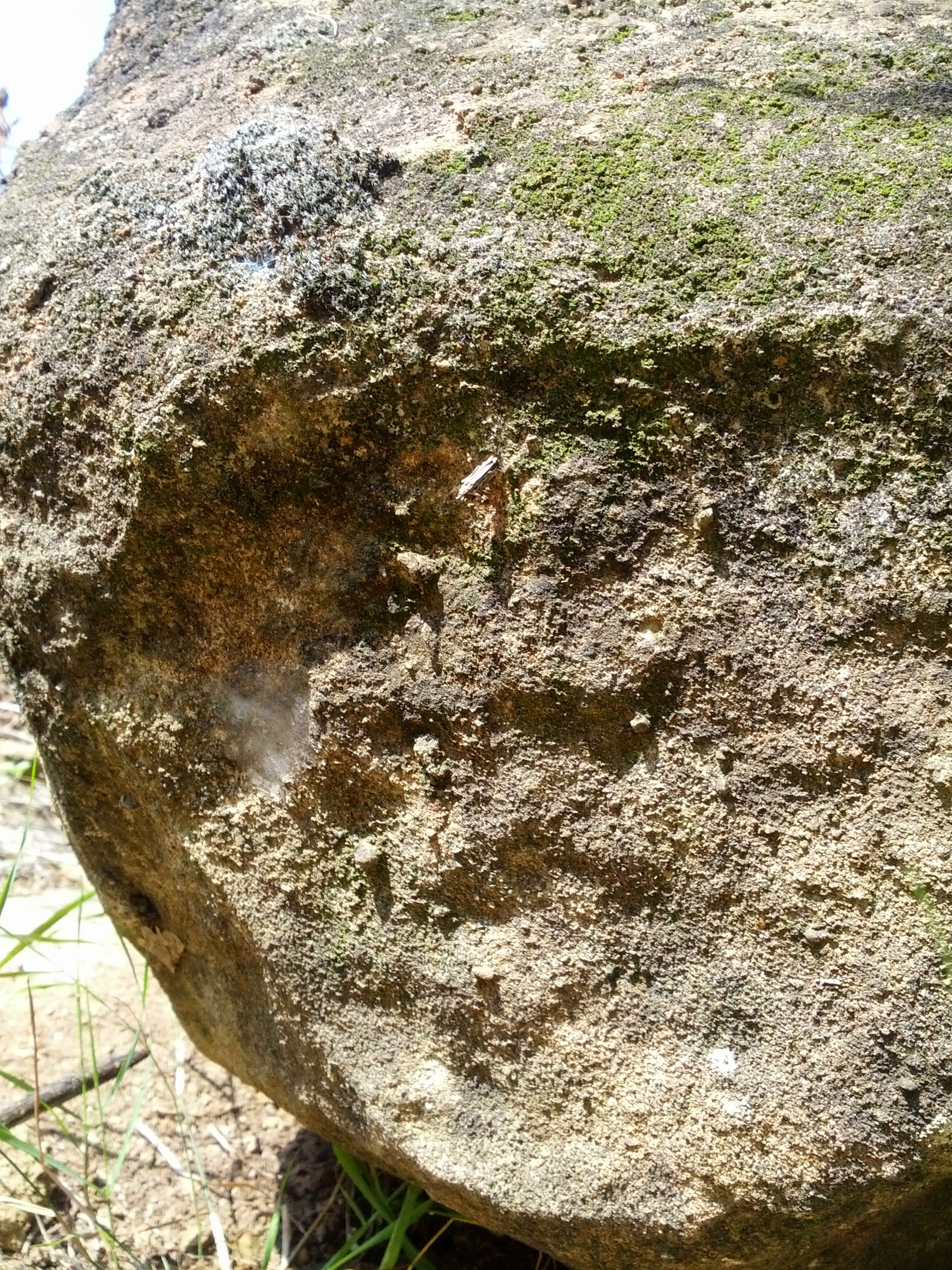
Carved signs at one of the stones of the megaliths at the Montargull plain

Despite the fact that there is no direct evidence at Montargull, it is most likely that there was disperse neolithic population. All around the Montsec it is very common to find stone axes, sinks and wedges, and fairly close to Montargull, the "Roureda de Vernet", a place was found where these tools were built, corresponding to the so-called neolithic technique (4500–2500 BCE).

There are also findings in the surroundings from the Bronze Age (2500–1100 BC), like for instance axes collected near Collderat and Tudela, together with ship-shaped mills, collected at the Artesa de Segre Museum collection. Corresponding to the Iberian period (sixth to second century bC), there is the archaeological site of Antona close to Artesa de Segre, as well as graves at several close locations. Right at Montargull two megalithic constructions can be found, and it is uncertain to which culture they belong, but everything seems to show that they should belong to a late prehistoric period.

From the Roman and Visigothic periods there are few vestiges. From the Romans there are several samples all around the district, and it is fairly common to find coins from this era next to Montmagastre.

=== Middle age ===
The whole county was at the border between the first Catalan counties and the Muslim domination of Catalonia. For instance in 1003 Wadih, a freeman general of Abd-al-Malik, takes control of the Montmagastre fortress (Mumagars) and settles Muslim people there. This domination seems to be short since apparently in 1010 a Catalan expedition departs from this castle towards Córdoba. Once the Muslims start to withdraw, the county starts to be resettled, for instance by Arnau Mir de Tost, who starts the colonization of the lands near to Artesa de Segre in the middle of the eleventh century. In his will he signs various agreements mentioning villages and fortresses around Montargull, such as Montmagastre, Alentorn, Mirandol Vall-llebrera, Grialó, Comiols and Artesa de Segre.

Possibly the first reference in history on Montargull is the confirmation of the possessions of the monastery of Sant Miguel of Montmagastre, by means of a bull signed by Pope Alexander II at Montpellier (Languedoc) in 1162. Between these possessions there was the parish of Montargull. From this moment on and until the end of the Middle Ages the parish remains under the governance of Sant Pere of Ager. There are more references about the village at the end of the Middle Ages, together with other villages, concerning the collection of taxes (delme or onzens), a tax that was started to be collected after the Catalan Courts celebrated at Barcelona in 1365. These taxes were collected to finance the war against Castille. In the proceedings for 1373 for these taxes Montargull is mentioned.

A demographic estimate for the low Middle Ages can be obtained from the hearth taxes that were successively run. Montargull is not mentioned separately from other villages of the county, but the aggregate information can give an idea of the evolution of the population in Montargull. During the 1359–1414 period, for instance, in Anya and Montargull there were 26 fires. During the 1515 hearth tax 60 fires were reported for the whole Anya county, from which 30 belong to the Montmagastre barony, where Montargull was included. As a reference, the total number of fires counted in Artesa de Segre did not arrive to 60.

Some medieval tombs can be found close to the Les Plates ranch, a masia within the district of Montmagastre. It is a funerary monument with medieval slabs.

=== Modern age ===
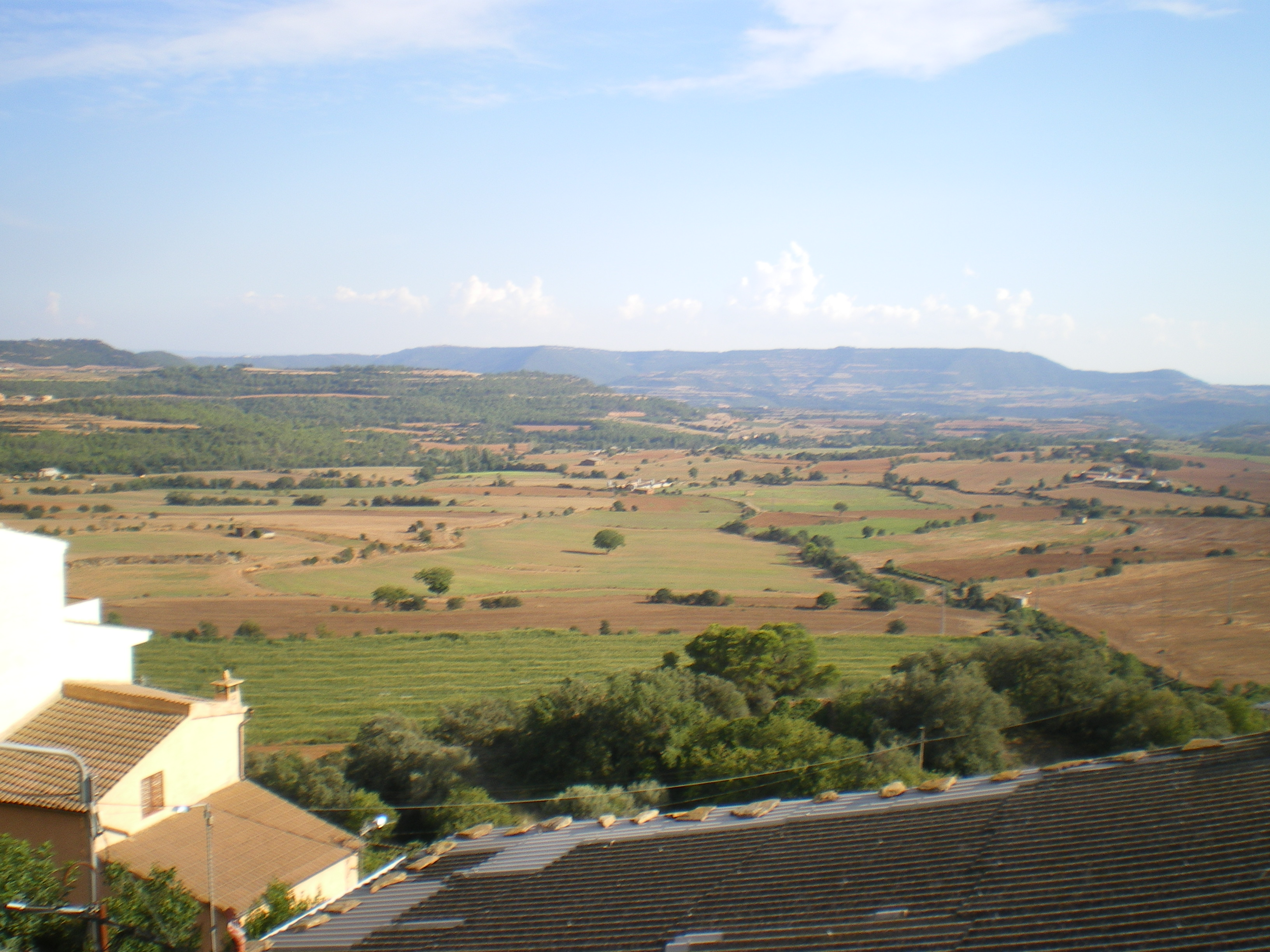
View of the Montargull valley from the square in front of the old school (Plaça de l'estudi)

During the sixteenth century, the parish of Sant Mary of Montargull, as well as the whole seniority of Artesa de Segre, gets under the governance of the Santa Maria de Montserrat Abbey. It is possible that during this period the current building of the old church, nowadays in ruins, was built, since it has a style from the Renaissance or Barroco period.

Coinciding with the Nueva Planta decrees, there is a Royal Cadastre created in 1716, indicating for Anya and Montargull 35 inhabitants. After the War of the Spanish Succession all the villages from the county remained under the jurisdiction of the Corregimiento of Cervera, and Montargull remained under the jurisdiction of the Count of Santa Coloma. By 1785, the seniority of Montargull belonged to Antònia de Gualteró i Queral. There is no demographic data between 1716 and 1785, but the existing data show that the Mid Segre region did not increase its population significantly, in contrast with the Lleida region in general. For instance for Anya population changes from 35 to 22 inhabitants, and for Artesa de Segre from 80 to 100.

=== Contemporaneous age ===
==== Economics and population ====
From the beginning of the twentieth century cereal agriculture started to get spread in the Montargull valley, creating a lot of cereal plantations in substitution of the olive trees that were at the valley before. The Diccionario de Madoz, a very comprehensive atlas prepared during the nineteenth century that surveyed every village in Spain, says that at the middle of the nineteenth century there were 15 houses and the church, with 4 neighbours and 25 people living in the village. The total population reported for the whole district is of 75, with 14 electors and 5 delegates, and 6 recruited soldiers (18 to 24 old boys). There are several rural houses (masia) reported: Cal Vedrunya, Cal Massana, Call Llinàs, Cal Malòs and Cal Janot. The crops mentioned are barley, oats, potatoes, wine and oil. Cattle is also mentioned, with cows, porks and sheep. The only industry mentioned is an olive oil mill, and from here there could come a refrain "Montargull té molt orgull, per l'oli que s'hi cull" ("Montargull has a lot of pride, due to the oil that is collected). According to the Madoz dictionary, another important industry was wood burning for the production of coal, which was prepared both at Montargull and Montmagastre. Coal was being exported to Lleida, Balaguer and Agramunt, and was being sold around the district. Total wealth is reported to be 13,935 reales (as a reference, notice that for Artesa de Segre the Madoz dictionary reports 121,170 reales.)

Another reference to trade in Montargull can be found in trade registers of 1799, at an accounting book maintained by the wool merchants Joan Ricart and his brother Cadascó, lo Sardanet (meaning coming from Cerdanya). Entries in pounds from Barcelona can be found for bacon, hemp seeds, beans, oil, wine and other goods.

Towards the end of the nineteenth century it is possible that the village had some houses in bad shape, as some people travelling along describe it. Also, at the beginning of the twentieth century 60 building and 192 inhabitants in fact (and 209 in law) were reported, according to the Geografia General de Catalunya of Francesc Carreras i Candi.

In 1833, during the First Carlist War, Montargull is attacked by guerrilla Carlist parties together with Anya and Baldomar.

==== Freeway to Pallars Jussà ====
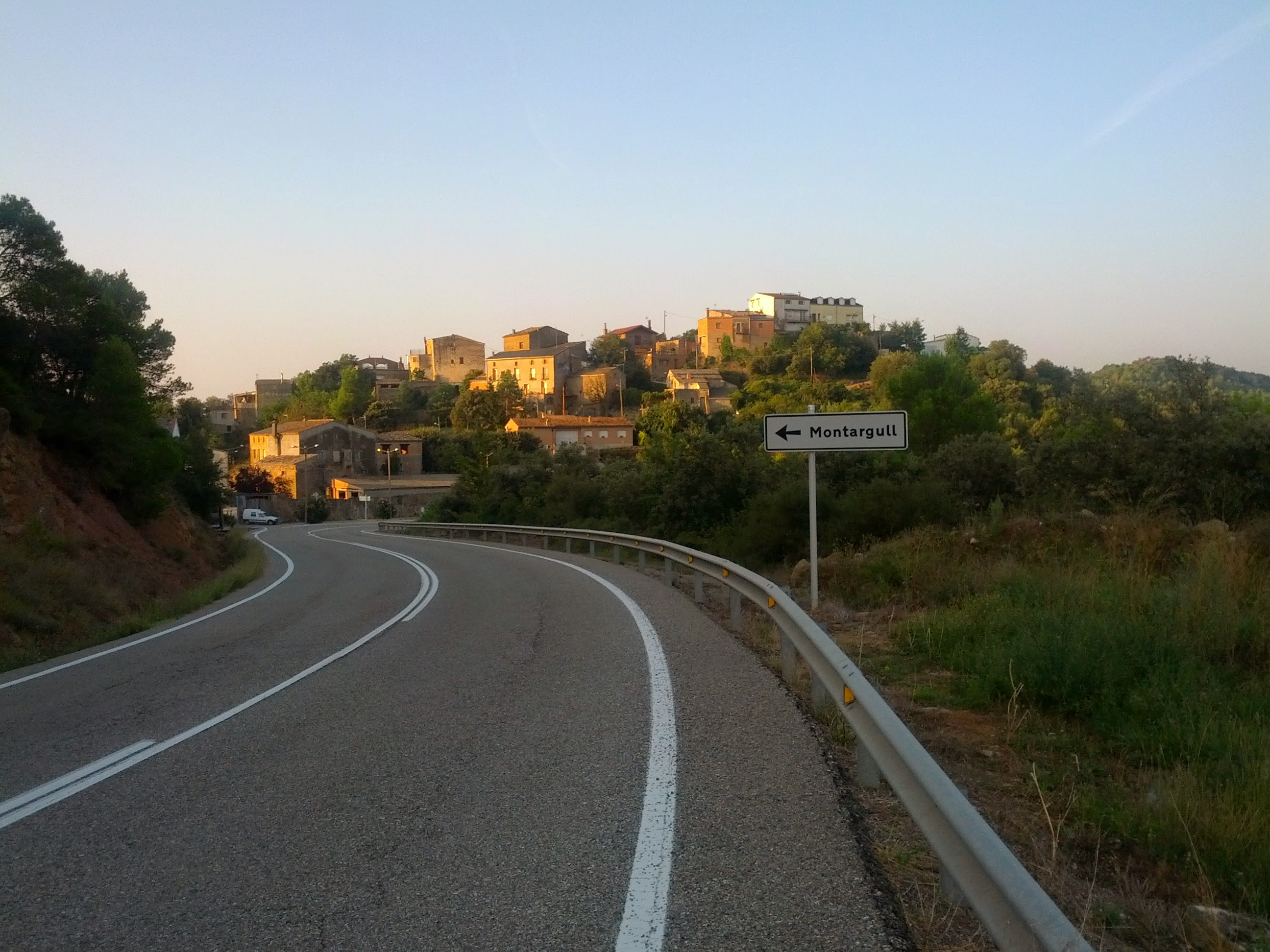
Entry to Montargull going downhill at the L-512 freeway from Folquer

Towards 1870 the freeway from Artesa de Segre to Tremp was opened. Before the construction of this freeway, communication between La Noguera and Pallars Jussà was very difficult, according to the description of several travellers. For instance the writer from Mallorca Marià Aguiló i Fuster describes a horse trip around the middle of the nineteenth century to collect folk traditions. During this trip he went downhill from Comiols to Artesa de Segre, passing through Folquer and Montargull.

The new freeway replaced a very old road going from Ponts to Isona, going along an old Roman road, as the main connection between La Noguera and Pallars Jussà. Transportation was done by means of stagecoaches, and sometimes they stopped at Montargull. The main transportation company was La Catalana, which later was acquired by the Alsina Graells company. At the beginning of the twentieth century to go from Barcelona to Montargull, first four hours were needed to arrive by train to Tarrega and from there 11 more hours in stagecoach to arrive to Montargull. Before it was reformed, the freeway had a lot of curves and it had to be travelled very slowly. As a reference, the stagecoach took 45 minutes for the six kilometres from Folquer until Montargull. The freeway would still be very difficult to travel and produced a lot of accidents, like for instance the one reported in September 1924 when a neighbour of Montargull dies when his coach tumbles at the 24th kilometer of the freeway between Artesa de Segre and Tremp.

==== The parish of Sant Mary of Montargull ====
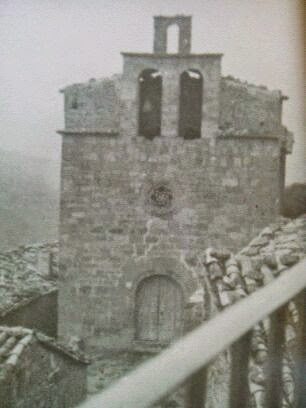
Sant Mary of Montargull in 1952.

At the end of the nineteenth century, the parish of Montargull was integrated into the Archpriest of Artesa de Segre, which in turn dependent from the Diocese of Lleida. The priest received 800 reals. During the twentieth century the parish of Sant Mary of Montargull would remain, together with the Archpriest of Artesa de Segre, under the jurisdiction of Seu d'Urgell.

==== The school of Montargull ====
The school of Montargull was working fully at least from the middle of the nineteenth century. It is registered that in 1866 there was a school for boys and it had an endowment of 160 escudos, that the teaching position was vacant, and that the teacher Josep Riart took the teacher post in 1867.

In 1907 the teacher Josep Berenguer Galán takes the post at the school, and in 1912 Arturo Talón Carme becomes the teacher, substituting Rafael Rubio who gets an assignment in Guadalajara. This same year Josep Riart Pascuet becomes the teacher. This teacher, who had been interim teacher for many years before taking the post, stays a long time at the school, and he participates in several activities related to the creation of the Escola Superior De Cultura (Upper School of Culture) with gender-mixed education at Artesa de Segre. In 1927 he is mentioned as collaborating in receiving school camps from Barcelona. After the establishment of the Second Spanish Republic, in 1932 the Montargull school was also of gender-mixed education.

=== Twentieth century ===
==== Spanish Civil War (1936–1939) ====
As the whole of Catalonia, Montargull remained under the control of the republicans from the beginning of the Spanish Civil War in July 1936 until almost the end of it at the beginning of 1939. In contrast with other places, at Montargull there was no retaliation against right wing people or the Church, except for hooking off the bells. There were, however, some expropriations in order to support the war front.

During the Spanish Civil War the bells of the church of Montmagastre were hooked off and broken. The sound of the bells of Montmagastre were appreciated at Montargull, since they could be heard perfectly. Following the orders of the authorities, under the threat of a war council, the bells of the church of Sant Mary were also hooked off and dragged tied by ropes to the freeway. Once the war was over, in order to substitute the old bells, an aviation bomb was used, and it remained in use until the collapse of the old church. The use of shell bombs was as church bells was common, and can still be seen at the church of Vernet (Artesa de Segre).

The war front arrives to the Montsec Range in April, 1938, and for some months there are war operations all around the district. Some of the troops would stay overnight at the village when they were moving to Ponts or other places nearby, and there are some reports that the village was quite depopulated at that time. Two of the brigades of the 32nd Division, number 137 and 141, and one brigade of the 26th Division known as the "Durruti Brigade" would develop operations around the Anya district, at that time an independent municipality. The commandment of those troops established an operation center at Cal Tonet of Montargull.

The final offensive on Catalonia started at the beginning of 1939. Montargull is occupied on January 2, 1939, by the 150th Division of the National Army. A report has been found of a soldier of the occupying army, Bonifacio Zamora, who wrote a couple of poems when he was at Montargull in January 1939. Right on January 2 the National Army advances until 9 km from Artesa de Segre. Vall-llebrera is occupied by the 61st Division of the same army, and this division advances along the Segre until arriving in front of Vilves. The next day, January 3, the 150th Division occupies Anya and crosses the river. From then on, and for approximately one month, there is very hard fighting around Artesa de Segre, until the final advance of the National Army towards Barcelona.

Montargull, and other villages and cities in the country, are also remembered by members of the Spanish Republican Army fleeing to France, for instance Aveŀlí Artís-Gener (Tísner), who was a member of the 60th Division of the 8th Body of the Republican Army, who describes the retreat from Cubells, going through the Boada hills, leaving behind Lluçars and Montargull, trying to get closer to the Ripollès country.

==== Postwar ====
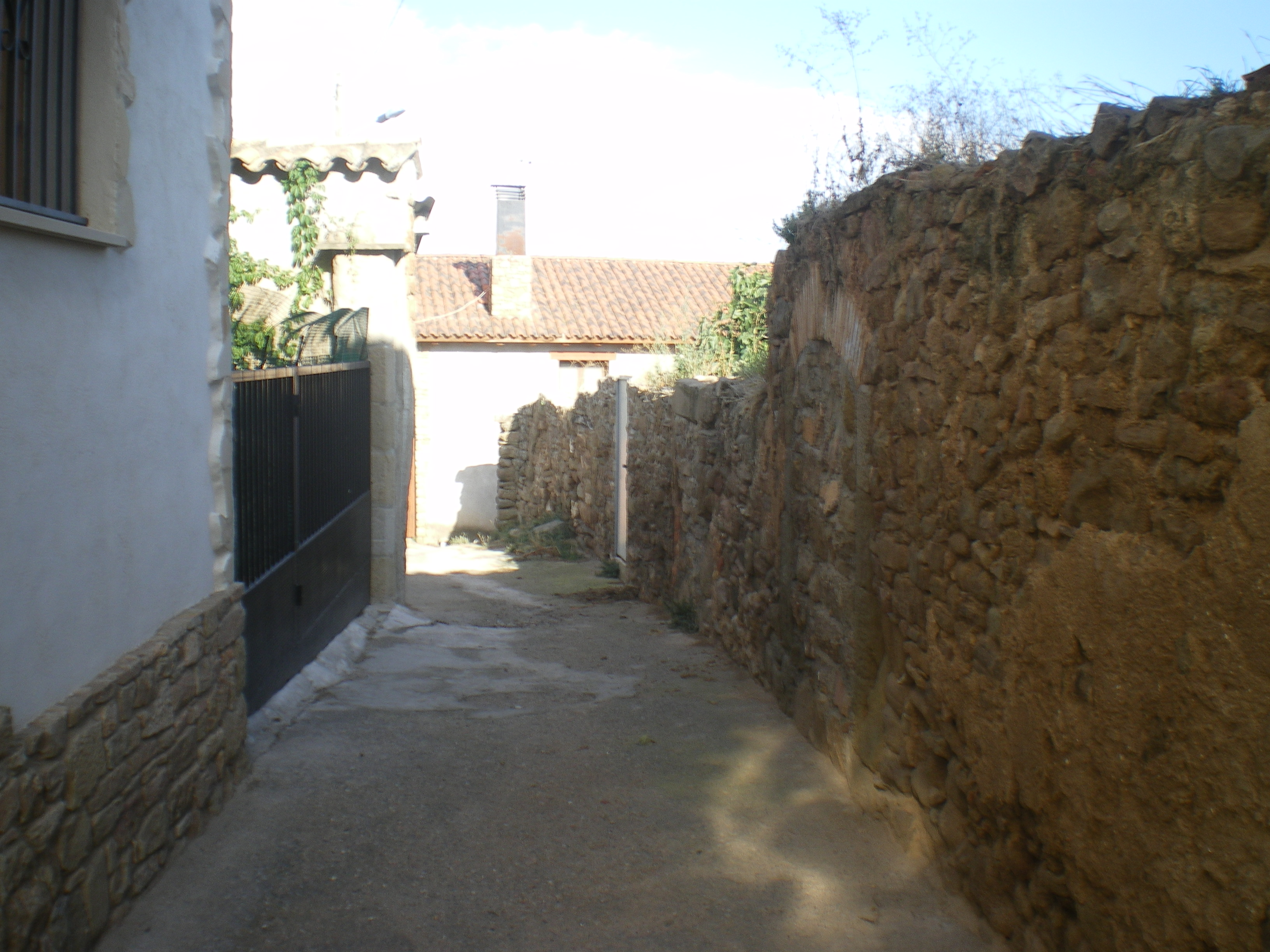
Carrer Major of Montargull

Once the war was over, several persons of Montargull were imprisoned after being betrayed by a single person. During the 40s the imprisoned people started returning to the village, as they benefited from term exemptions, but there were a couple of cases who remained in jail until the end of the decade.

During the 50s there were still a lot of people living in the village. At each house there were several generations of the same family, and there were a lot of children and young people. Electricity arrived in 1955, simultaneously to Anya and Vall-llebrera. Telephone service had been inaugurated by the Mancomunitat on May 8, 1921, when Artesa de Segre was connected with Vall-llebrera and Montargull.

Towards the end of the 50s the ceiling of the old Sant Mary of Montargull church collapsed, during the patron festival of Montargull. Due to a last-minute problem, the priest could not officiate and this was crucial to avoid some casualties at the collapse. The religious celebrations were held at the school from them on and until the new church was constructed at the end of the 70s.

Once the economic growth is recovered at the beginning of the '60s, after a lot of years of autarchy, Montargull starts experiencing a strong emigration and will end up almost completely depopulated. Furthermore, a lot of residents prefer to move to the larger cities in the county to get closer to the main services (health, education, and others). Starting already at the end of the Civil War a lot of families have moved from the upper part of the village to new houses constructed next to the freeway. Nowadays a lot of the old abandoned houses can still be seen in the former main street of the village, Carrer Major.

==== Present times ====
At the end of the 60s the school is closed following the governmental policy of creating county or concentration schools, approved on November 9, 1963. After democracy was restored this policy was reverted and the school could have been reopened, since there was the minimum number of children, but the parents preferred to have their children in a larger school in Artesa de Segre and so the school remained closed.

A the beginning of the 70s drinkable water arrived to Montargull, substituting several wells existing at some houses in the village. Apart from wells, several houses had water tankers to collect rain water, and there are still some of them surviving today. The water arrives to the village through a tube 10 km long, installed by the residents of Montargull themselves with their own hands, and connecting the Fontfreda fountain, located at the gorge of this same name.

The L-512 freeway is reformed during the 80s and acquires its current aspect, widening it and reducing the amount of curves to ease the access to Comiols and Pallars Jussà.

== Demography ==
Montargull has had significant population changes over the years, with a maximum at the beginning of the nineteenth century, and another peak at the second quarter of the twentieth century, and a decay due to heavy emigration starting in the 60s:

Population evolution (1857–2013)
1857	1888	1900	1910	1920	1930	1940	1950	1960	1970	1981	1986	1991	2000	2005	2010	2013
231	126	192	157	144	125	93	143	162	150	62	62	76	58	57	56	43

== Politics ==
On June 16, 1965, Montargull gets added to the Artesa de Segre municipality. Before that, it formed a municipal district together with Alentorn, Anya, Montmagastre, Vall-llebrera, Vall-llebrerola, Folquer and Comiols, with the city hall in Anya.

There is a neighbour who officiates as the municipal delegate at the village, and he is considered the major by the rest of neighbours. From these "majors" there are several chronicles such as the one at the beginning of the Spanish Civil War because he hosted another major dismissed by the Republican government, or the one after the war had finished, who due to resentments caused the imprisonment of several neighbours.

== Architectonic and artistic heritage ==
=== Megaliths of the Pla of Montargull ===
41°58′16.68″N 1°06′08.69″E

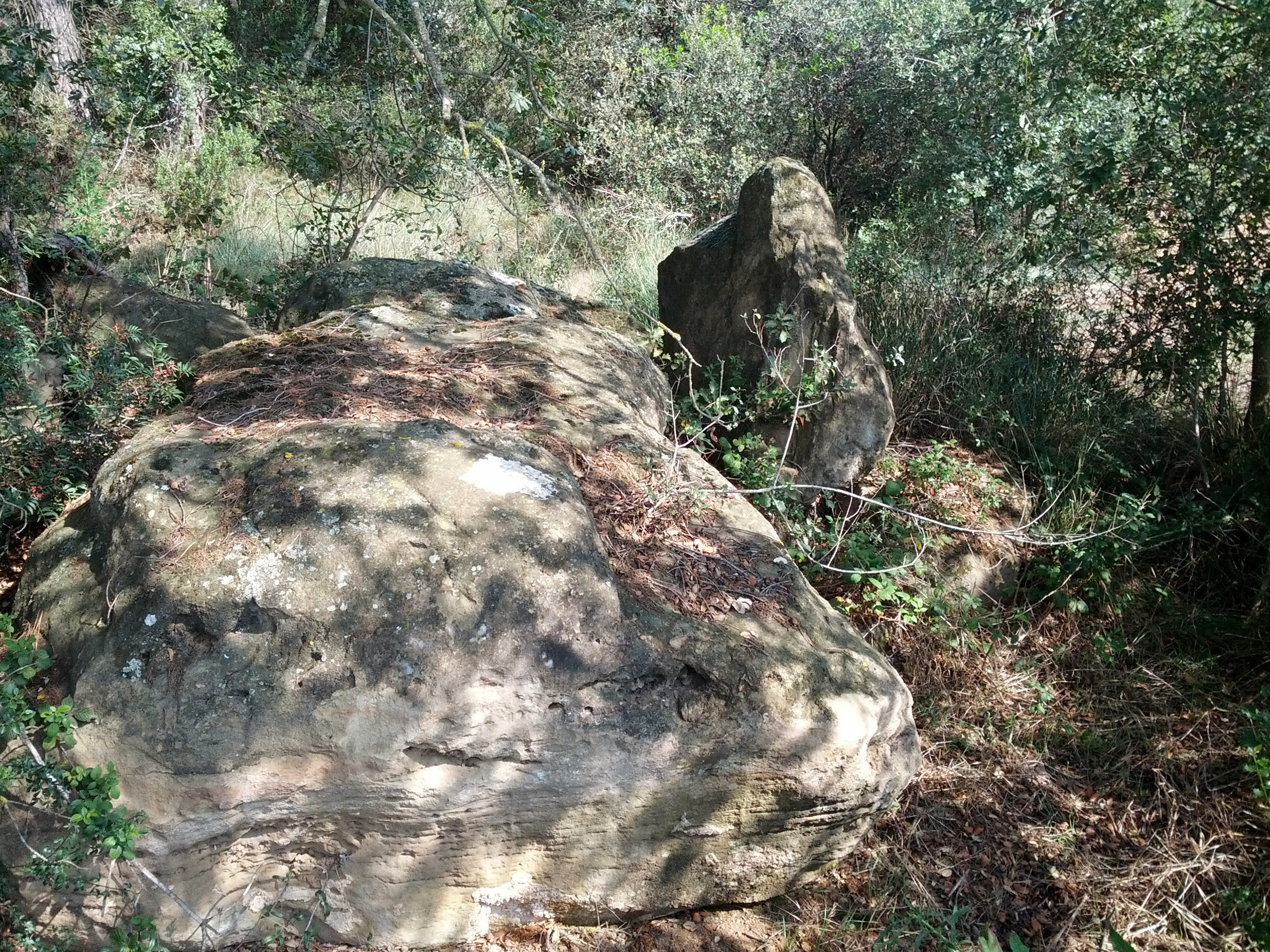
Megaliths of the Pla of Montargull

Two megalithic constructions can be found at the Montargul district probably corresponding to the recent prehistory. To arrive to them, an unpaved road behind the last houses in the village has to be taken and arrive to the cemetery. After about one km, and after passing in front of a farm on the left side of the road, the first deviation to the left has to be taken. Twenty meters on this road on the left side of the road, a field has to be crossed for about 50 meters. The megaliths can be found directly at the margin of the forest behind this field.

There are two megalithic constructions next to each other and they are quite hidden by vegetation. One of them has a quadrangular basis with different stone blocks planted in the ground. The interior has about 4 square meters. All stones are in their original place except one which is fallen. The second construction has also a quadrangular basis but the composing stones are smaller than in the first construction. One of the stones of this second set has a carved inscription. From the walls forming the closure of this structure only three can be seen. Based on the status of the whole construction and the easiness of access it can be inferred that it has suffered several plunders.

=== Medieval tombs of Les Pletes ===
41°59′16.01″N 1°06′30.23″E

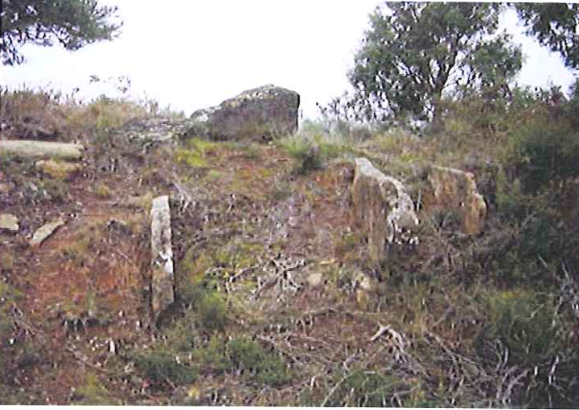
Medieval tombs of Les Pletes

It can be reached taking the L-512 freeway between Montargull and Folquer and approximately 1 km from Montargull on an exit to the right of the freeway which says "Masia Les Pletes". Once the entrance of the Masia has been reached, the tombs can be found on a road starting from this entrance at about 100 m. It is funerary monument from the Middle Ages. The necropolis is composed by several flat stones distributed as a rectangle.

=== Old church of Santa Maria de Montargull ===
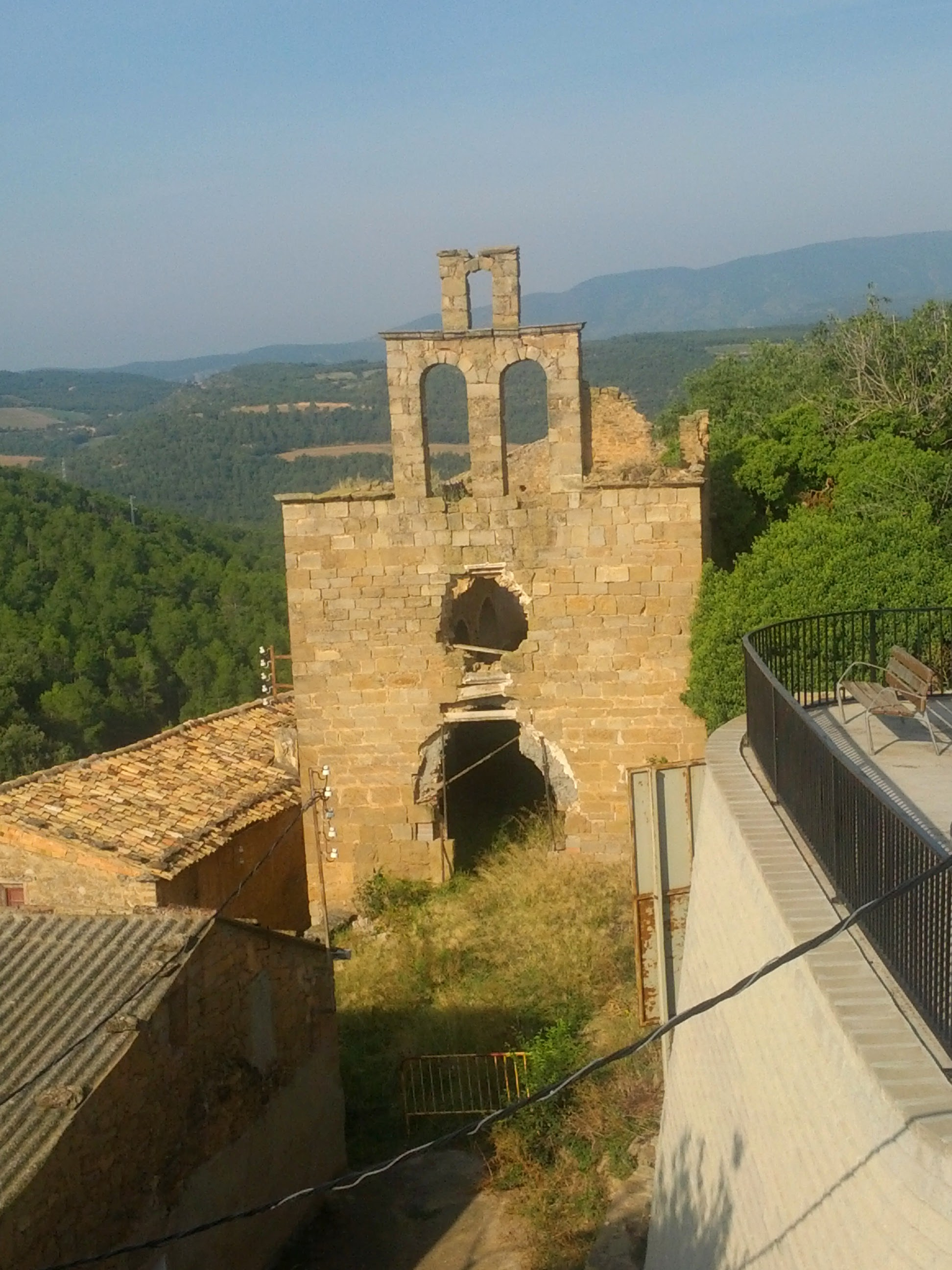
Church of Santa Maria de Montargull in 2014

The building of the old church of Santa Maria de Montargull was constructed during the Renaissance period, probably during the sixteenth century, under the dominion of the Montserrat Monastery, and was dedicated to Saint Mary. Nowadays it lost the ceiling and all the ornaments from the front wall have been plundered. Furthermore, both the entrance and interior are full of brambles and other vegetation.

=== New parochial church of Santa Maria de Montargull ===
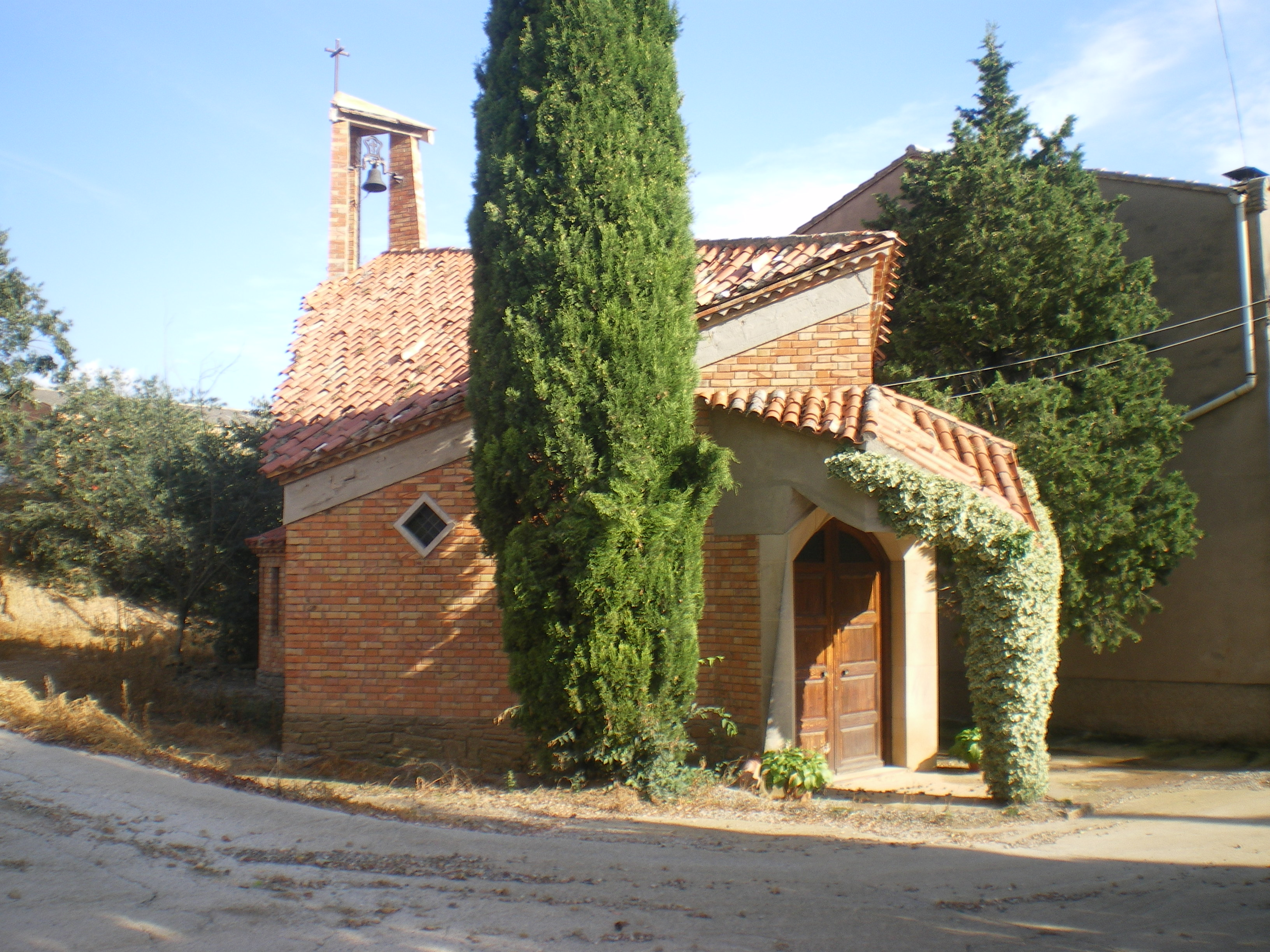
New church of Santa Maria de Montargull

The new parochial church was constructed in 1968. It is also dedicated to Saint Mary, and it follows the same style as the church of Artesa de Segre (both designed by the same architect, Isidre Puig i Boada). Folquer and Comiols depend from this parish. It is located next to the freeway at the first entrance to the village arriving from Artesa de Segre.

=== The masias from the Montargull Plain ===
The Montargull Plain is an extension at the end of the Comiols range, where several masias can be found at the margin of various crops. Nowadays also pork and chicken farms can be found. The masias existing today are: Cal Benjamín, Canterrers, Cal Gironet, Cal Janot, Cal Massana, Cal Mingo, Cal Miquel, Cal Sardanet, Cal Serra and Cal Xollat.

=== School of Montargull ===
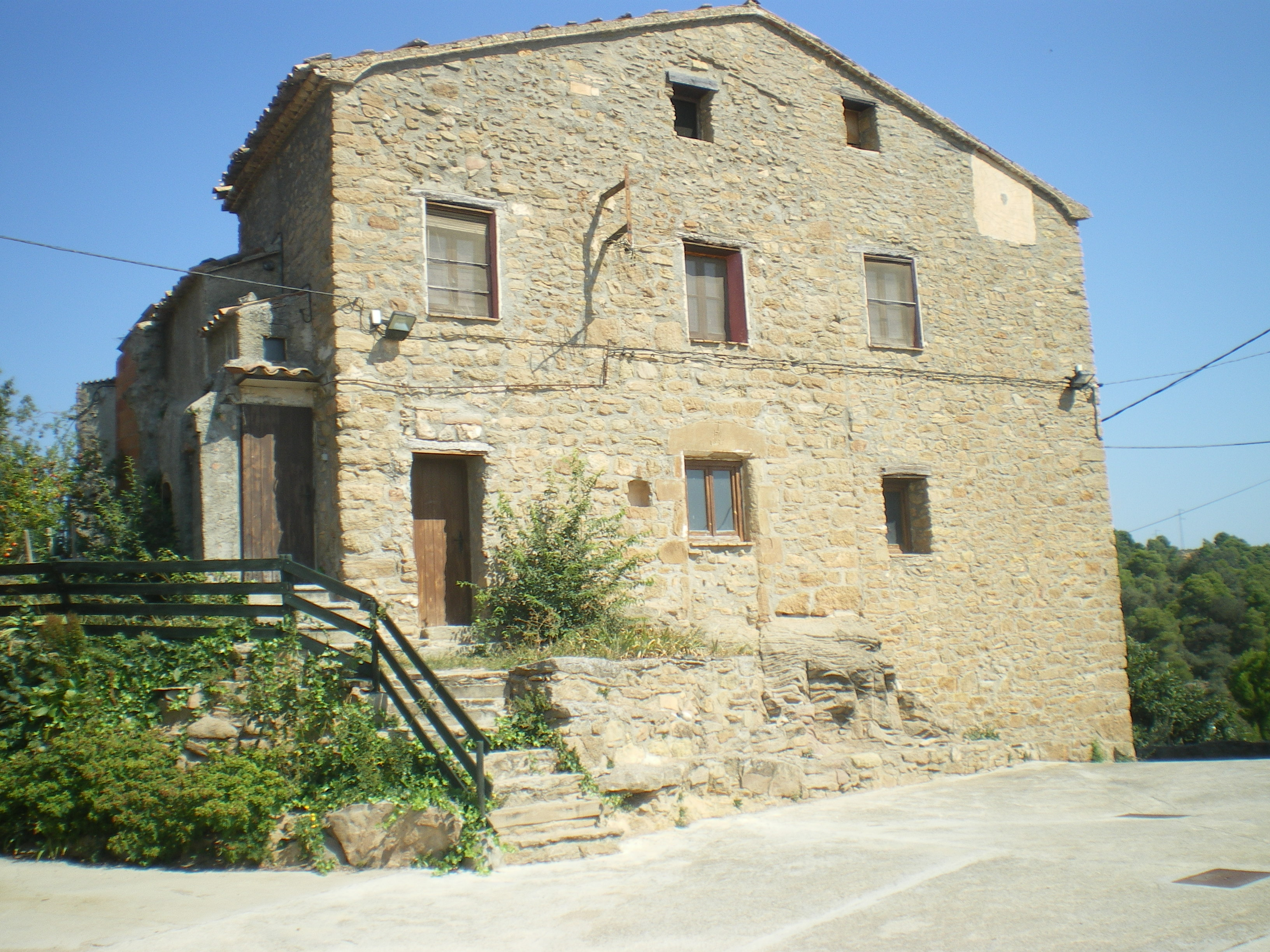
School of Montargull

The schoolf of Montgargull, known at the village by "l'estudi" (the study place), is located at a building with a carved stone in the front wall were "1635" can be read. It is a two-story building with stone walls. At the ground floor there is the classroom, where classes were held for children in primary school age. The first floor is where the teacher lived. The school was closed following the concentration policy promoted by Francoist Spain at the beginning of the 60s. Nowadays the building is used for social gatherings of the village.

The old school is located at Plaça de l'Estudi, a square with a complete view of the Montargull Plain. The square was reconstructed in 1997, but it collapsed after floods close to Christmas of the same year. The square was reconstructed again in 2005.

=== The cross of the Holy Mission of 1965 ===
41°58′12.63″N 1°05′40.90″E

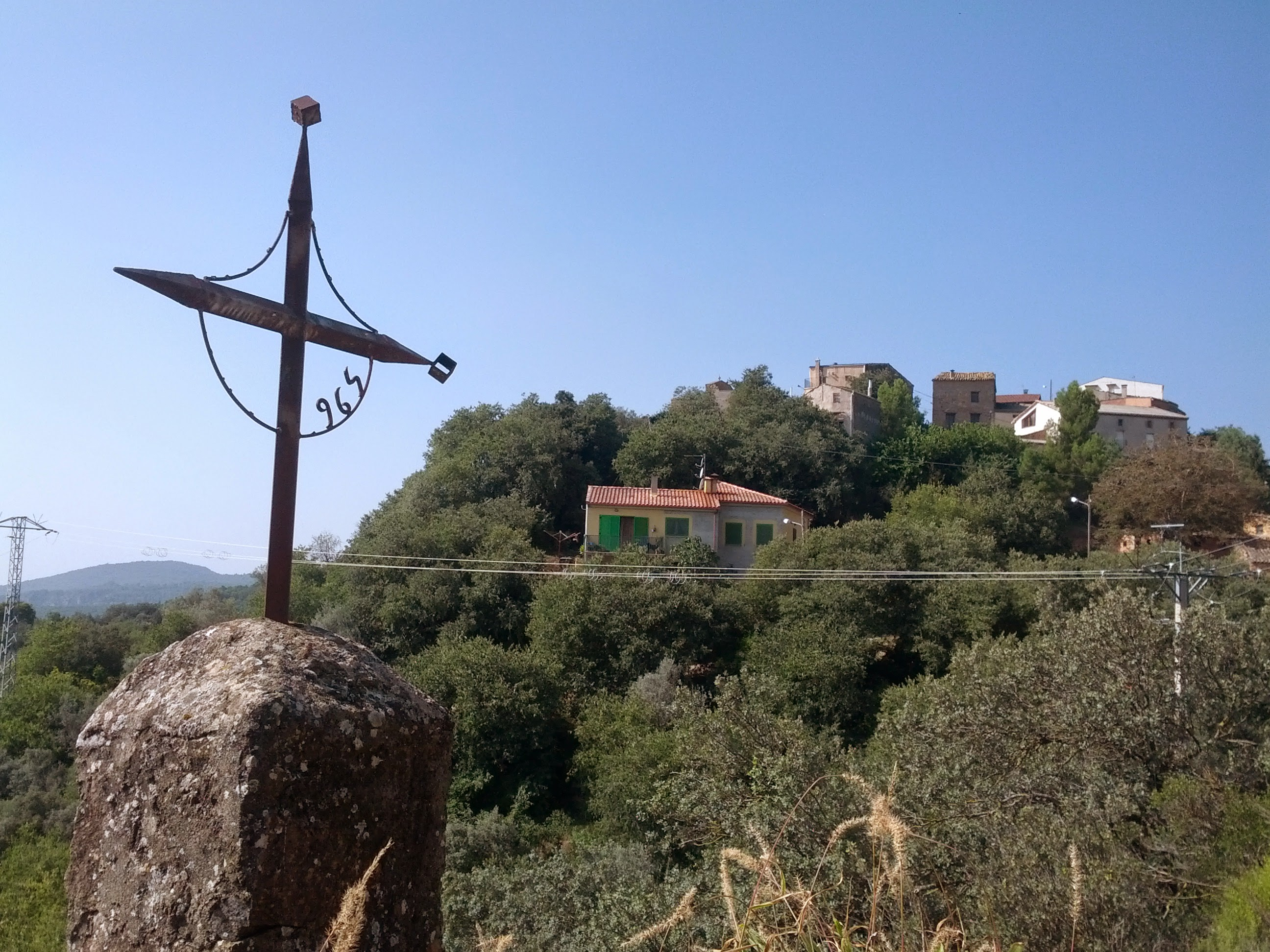
Cross of the Holy Mission of 1965 at Montargull

This cross can be found at the road starting at the back of the village, at the first turn after the entrance to the cemetery. It is a simple iron cross where "1965" can be read, without the "1" that is broken. Its construction can be attributed to the "Holy Missions" ("Santes Missions") celebrated after the Spanish Civil War. Several testimonies in the form of crosses and monuments can be found at different cities and villages across Catalonia. Some of these crosses have been catalogued as symbols of Francoist Spain. The main goal of the Holy Missions was to reinforce the Catholic faith, and they received the support of Francoist Spain, like for instance the holy missions celebrated in Artesa de Segre in 1964, conducted by Claretian priests. Several activities were performed led by missionaries, lasting between one and three days, including ways of the cross, messes and processions. As a reminder of the celebration, they would construct a cross at some relevant place of the village, like the one that can be found in Montargull.

== Culture ==
Nowadays the most important cultural celebration is the Patronal Feast (Festa Major) of Montargull, which is celebrated during the closest week to September 24, which is Our Lady of Mercy Festival day (Mercè). At the main altar of the Santa Maria de Montargull church the Assumption can be found, and in the old days the patronal celebration was on 15 August (Saint Mary's day). Since long ago the patronal celebration was changed because it coincided with the mowing and the beating of the crops. Nowadays, the patronal celebration is close to Our Lady of Mery festival day, in September.

Due to the reduction of the inhabitants of the village, a lot of celebrations and cultural activities were abandoned. For instance on the 9 May the Our Lady of the Rosary celebration was held, honouring Saint Gregory. At Holy Week a procession was held until the Vedrenya Sanctuary, located at the Montmagastre district.

One of the biggest cultural celebrations that were held was Carnival. During the 1950s, Montargull's Carnival was considered one of the main attractions in the district. Celebrations started on Sunday morning with the young people in the village decorating a cart pulled by oxen with bells that went to receive the Carnival King (Rei Carnestoltes). On Sunday there was also a ball to celebrate the start of the celebrations, which lasted three days. On Monday people would go hunting and there was a collection called La Plega, a collection though all the houses and masias in procession with an accordionist hired for the whole three days of the celebration. On Tuesday, with the results of the hunt and the collection, there was a popular lunch. This is the only tradition kept nowadays on Sunday. The celebration finished with a speed on the platform for the musicians.

== Notable citizens ==
=== Felip Comabella i Guimet ===
Felip Comabella i Guimet (Montargull, May 13, 1841 – Barcelona, May 9, 1901) was a very well-known pharmacist. The Comabella drugstore managed by himself, his son and his grandson until 1946, was one of the most famous modernist buildings in Catalonia.

=== Geroni Riart i Bernaus ===
Geroni Riart i Bernaus was born in 1844 at Montargull and emigrated to South-America where he married Gregoria Vera from Paraguay. Geroni was the son of Josep Riart and Maria Antònia Bernaus of Cal Massana, where the Riart family lived since at least 1750. His third son, Luis Alberto Riart, was provisional president of Paraguay from March 17, 1924, until August 15 of the same year. He was a lawyer, and acted as Minister of Commerce, two-time Minister of Interior, Minister of War and Chancellor of the Republic of Paraguay.

== Bibliography ==
- Ajuntament d'Artesa de Segre (March 2009). Pla d'Ordenació Urbanística Municipal, Ajuntament d'Artesa de Segre. Catàleg de béns a protegir [Municipal Urban Order Plan, Artesa de Segre Municipality. Catalog of goods to protect] (PDF) (in Catalan). Archived from the original (PDF) on 2014-09-14.
- Arjona i Sales, Joan; Plens i Giral, Mercè; Aige i Donés, Miquel; Mirada i Rufach, Jaume; Baró i Novau, Anna; Español i Sabaté, Antoni; Gené i Rosa, Josep; Giribet i Boneta, Ramon; Olives i Giménez, M. Pilar; Solé i Torres, Ramona (2003). Descobrim Artesa de Segre i rodalies (in Catalan). Generalitat de Catalunya, Departament d'Ensenyament, Centre de Recursos Pedagògics de la Noguera.
- Balanyà i Abadia, Pere (1993). "Vestigis de la dominació islàmica a la Conca de Barberà (I): La toponímica del municipi de Llorac" (PDF). Aplec de Treballs (in Catalan) (11): 203–220. ISSN 0211-9722.
- Bofarull i Terrades, Manuel (2002). Origen dels noms geogràfics de Catalunya: pobles, rius, muntanyes (in Catalan). Valls: Cossetània Edicions. ISBN 84-956-8497-7.
- Bramon Planas, Dolors (1998). Nous textos d'historiadors musulmans referents a la Catalunya medieval (continuació de l'obra de J. Mª Millàs i Vallicrosa) (pdf) (in Catalan). Universitat Autònoma de Barcelona.
- Cabré i Puig, Antoni (2003). Excursions escollides pel Prepirineu: caminant des de sol ixent cap a sol ponent (in Catalan). Valls: Cossetània. ISBN 84-96035-55-7.
- Canyelles, Ramon I. (August 2003). "Esglésies amb campana d'obús (Part 1)" (PDF). La Palanca (in Catalan) (253): 18–19.
- Canyelles, Ramon I. (January 2004a). "Esglésies amb campana d'obús. La Vedrenya (Part 6)" (PDF). La Palanca (in Catalan) (262): 17–21.
- Canyelles, Ramon I. (October 2004b). "Esglésies amb campana d'obús (Darrera part)" (PDF). La Palanca (in Catalan) (271): 19.
- Canyelles, Ramon I. (April 10, 2005). "El món religiós a Artesa de Segre en els segles XIX i XX" (PDF). Presented at the Conference XXXVI Jornada del Grup de Recerques de les Terres de Ponent (in Catalan). Agramunt.
- de Borja Moll i Casasnovas, Francesc (1959). Els llinatges catalans (in Catalan). ISBN 84-273-0425-0.
- Feu i Gelis, Jordi (2005). "L'escola rural al segle XX. Política educativa i escola rural durant el franquisme" (PDF). Educació i Història: Revista d'Història de l'Educació (in Catalan) (8): 63–77. ISSN 1134-0258.
- Generalitat de Catalunya (September 23, 2004). "Actuació núm.: 2004/355" (pdf). Diari Oficial de la Generalitat de Catalunya (in Catalan) (4225).
- Iglésies, Josep (1998). "El Fogatge de 1515" (PDF). Separata de: Butlletí de la Societat Catalana d'Estudis Històrics: Filial de l'Institut d'Estudis Catalans (in Catalan) (9). ISSN 0213-6791.
- Jové i Serra, Bartomeu (March 2011). "El jovent de Montargull, 1950" (PDF). La Palanca (in Catalan) (342): 46.
- Jové i Serra, Bartomeu (March 2014). "Carnaval a Montargull. Anys 1950-1960". La Palanca (in Catalan) (375): 46.
- Lladonosa i Pujol, Josep (1990). Història d'Artesa de Segre i la seva comarca. Ajuntament d'Artesa de Segre. ISBN 84-505-9449-9.
- Madoz, Pascual (1845). Diccionario geográfico-estadístico-histórico de España y sus posesiones de ultramar (pdf) (in Spanish). Vol. II (ALICANTI MAYOR- ARZUELA). Madrid. p. 791.
- Madoz, Pascual (1850). Diccionario geográfico-estadístico-histórico de España y sus posesiones de ultramar (pdf) (in Spanish). Vol. III (ARR- BAR). Madrid. p. 616.
- Madoz, Pascual (1848). Diccionario geográfico-estadístico-histórico de España y sus posesiones de ultramar (pdf) (in Spanish). Vol. XI (MADRID-MOSTOLES). Madrid. p. 791.
- Maluquer de Motes, Joan (1983). Notes de prehistòria catalana: una indústria lítica de la comarca de La Noguera (in Catalan). Museu del Montsec d'Artesa de Segre.
- Maluquer i Wahl, Joan J. (October 1982). "Retalls d'història: Un monument al soldat desconegut mort a la guerra civil (I), I. L'atac a la Peixera del 1939" (PDF). La Palanca (in Catalan) (10): 23.
- Massot i Muntaner, Josep (2002). Els viatges folklòrics de Marià Aguiló (PDF) (in Catalan). Reial Acadèmia de Bones Lletres de Barcelona. ISBN 84-8415-399-1.
- Mayordomo, Alejandro (2010). Estudios sobre la política educativa durante el franquismo (in Spanish). Universitat de València. p. 303. ISBN 978-84-370-3868-1.
- Moré i Fluvià, Francesc (1992). Pàgines viscudes. Memòries de la guerra (PDF) (in Catalan). Archived from the original (PDF) on October 26, 2014.
- Morelló i Baget, Jordi (1997). "Els impostos sobre la renda a Catalunya: redelmes, onzens i similars" (PDF). Anuario de Estudios Medievales (in Catalan). 27 (27, 2): 903–968. doi:10.3989/aem.1997.v27.i2.628. Archived from the original (PDF) on October 15, 2014.
- Rocafort i Sansó, Ceferí (1918). Francesc Carreras i Candi (ed.). Geografia General de Catalunya. Província de Lleida (in Catalan). Vol. III.
- Sánchez i Agustí, Ferran (September 2001). "Repressió de postguerra: la pàgina de Montargull" (PDF). La Palanca (in Catalan) (234): 28–29.
- Santirso Rodríguez, Manuel (1995). Revolución liberal y guerra civil en Catalunya (1833-1840) (pdf) (in Spanish). Publicacions de la Universitat Autònoma de Barcelona. ISBN 84-490-0263-X.
- Zamora, Bonifacio (1940). Belisonancias: Poesía del frente, 1936-1939 (in Spanish). Burgos: Imprenta de Sucesor de Fournier.
