= Segre =

Segre may refer to:

== People ==
- Segre (surname), people with the surname Segre or Segrè

== Places ==
- Segre (river), a river in Catalonia, Spain
  - Sègre (department), a former French department in Catalonia
  - Sègre-Ter, a former French department in Catalonia
  - Segre Olympic Park, a canoeing and kayaking facility in Catalonia, Spain
  - Costers del Segre, a wine region in Catalonia, Spain
  - Artesa de Segre, a municipality in Catalonia, Spain
    - Tudela de Segre, a locality in Artesa de Segre, Catalonia, Spain
  - Torres de Segre, a municipality in Catalonia, Spain
  - Pic del Segre, a mountain between France and Spain
  - Pic Petit de Segre, a mountain between France and Spain
- Segré-en-Anjou Bleu, a commune in Maine-et-Loire, France
  - Segré, a locality in Segré-en-Anjou Bleu, Maine-et-Loire, France
  - Arrondissement of Segré, in Maine-et-Loire, France
  - Canton of Segré-en-Anjou Bleu, in Maine-et-Loire, France
- Segré, Burkina Faso

== Historical events ==
- Battle of the Segre, a series of battles fought during the Spanish Civil War
- Battle of Segré, a battle fought during the Breton–Norman War

== Science and mathematics ==
- Segrè chart
- Segre class
- Segre classification
- Segre cubic
- Segre embedding
- Segre surface
- Segre's theorem
- Segrè–Silberberg effect
- Zeuthen–Segre invariant

== Other uses ==
- Diari Segre or Segre, a Spanish- and Catalan-language daily newspaper
- 29910 Segre, a minor planet
