= Montargull =

Montargull may refer to:

- Montargull (Artesa de Segre), village in the Artesa de Segre municipality, Catalonia
- Montargull (La Vansa i Fórnols), in the municipality of la Vansa i Fórnols, Catalonia
- Montargull (Llorac), small abandoned village in the municipality of Llorac, Catalonia
- Montargull (Avinyonet del Penedès), masia in the municipality of Avinyonet del Penedès, Catalonia
