= Seró =

- Locality
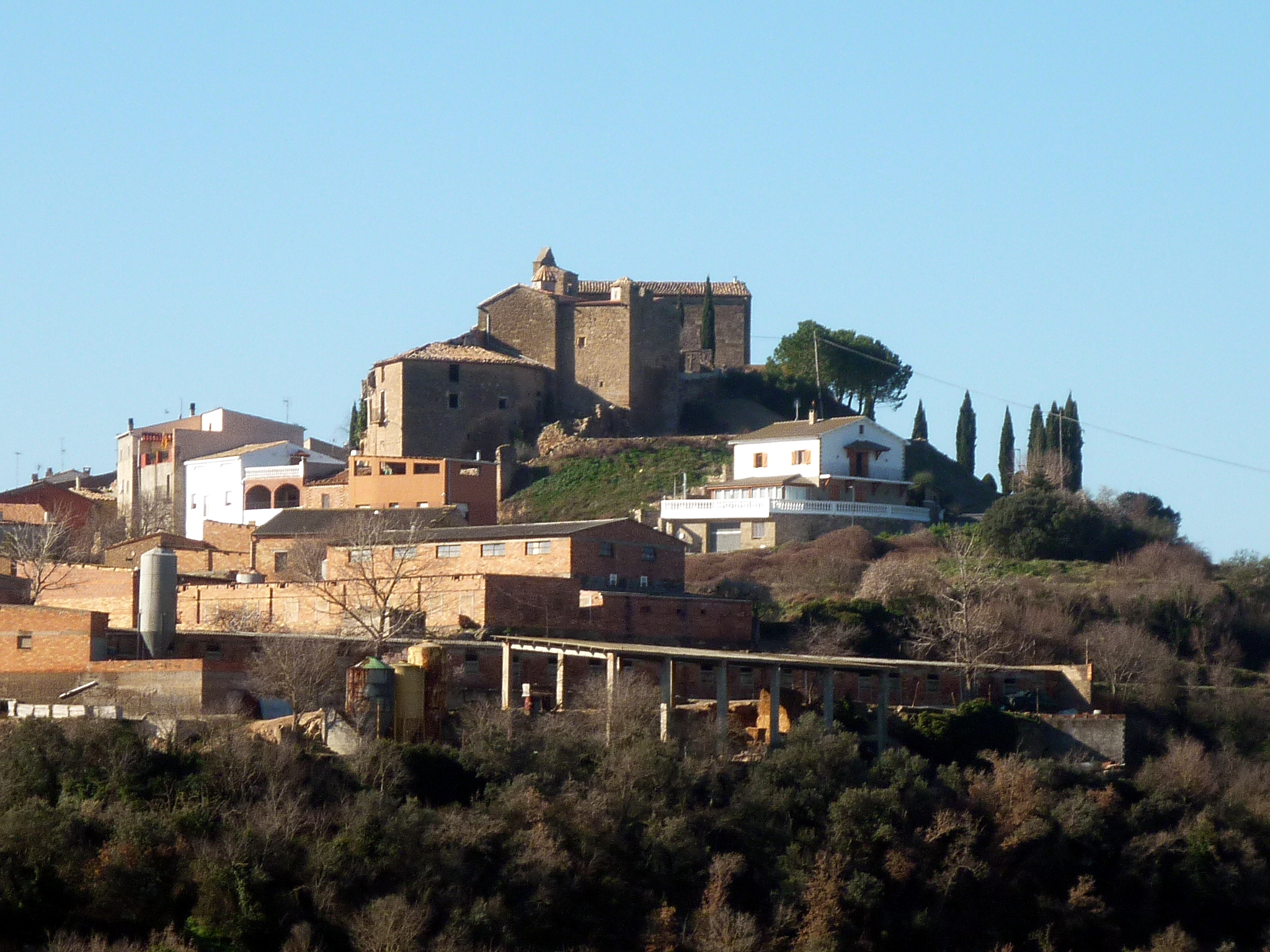

- Location within Province of Lleida Location within Catalonia Location within Spain
- Coordinates: 41°52′30″N 1°6′25″E
- Country: Spain
- Community: Catalonia
- Province: Lleida
- Municipality: Artesa de Segre
- Elevation: 434 m (1,424 ft)

Population
  - Total: 55

Seró is a hamlet located in the municipality of Artesa de Segre, in Province of Lleida province, Catalonia, Spain. As of 2020, it has a population of 55.

== Geography ==
Seró is located 65km east-northeast of Lleida.
