= Anya, Artesa de Segre =

Anya
- Locality
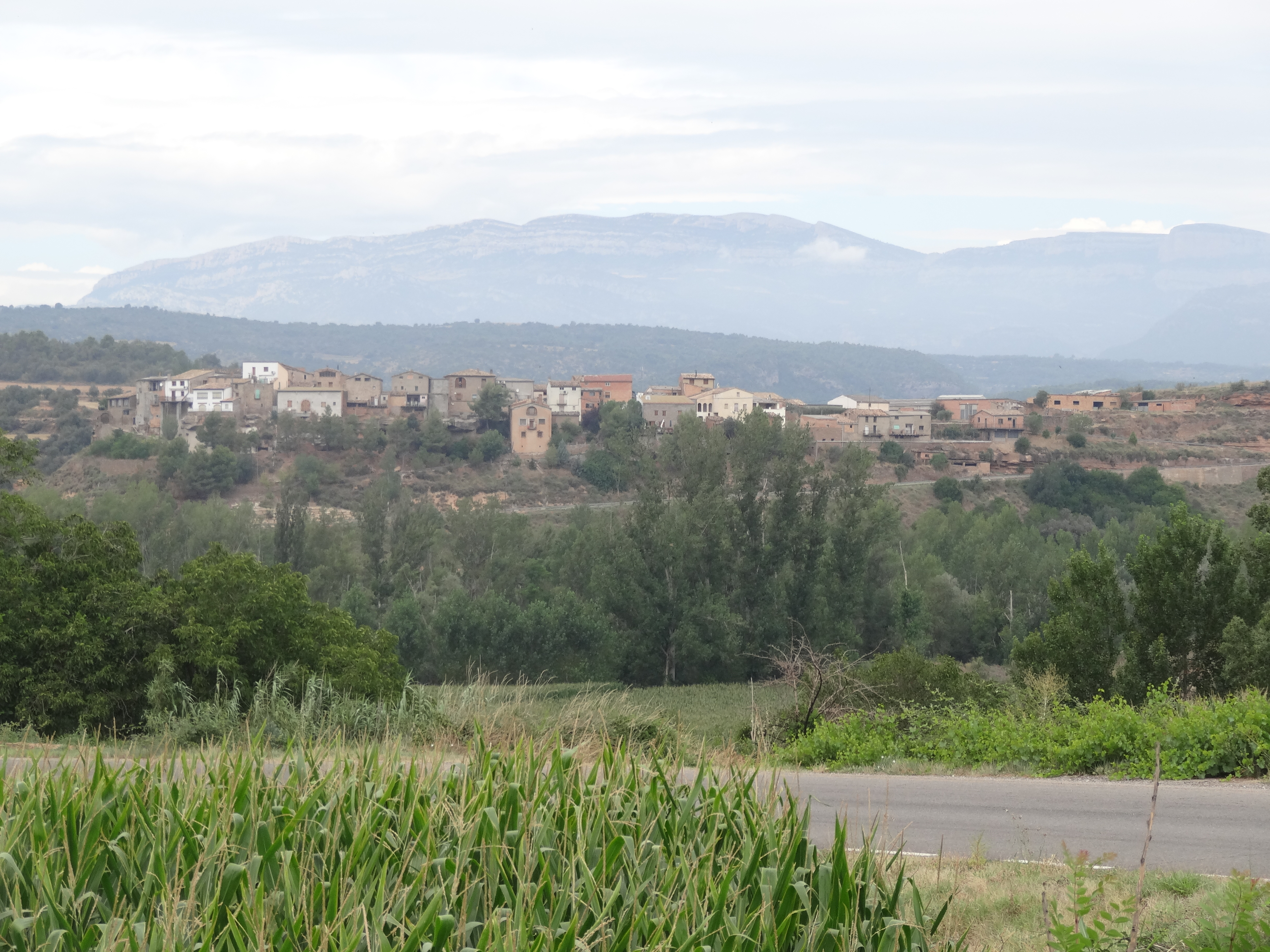

- Location within Province of Lleida Location within Catalonia Location within Spain
- Coordinates: 41°55′26″N 1°6′23″E
- Country: Spain
- Community: Catalonia
- Province: Lleida
- Municipality: Artesa de Segre
- Elevation: 359 m (1,178 ft)

Population
  - Total: 22

Anya is a locality located in the municipality of Artesa de Segre, in Province of Lleida province, Catalonia, Spain. As of 2020, it has a population of 22.

== Geography ==
Anya is located 67 km northeast of Lleida.
