= Vall-Llebrerola =

- Locality
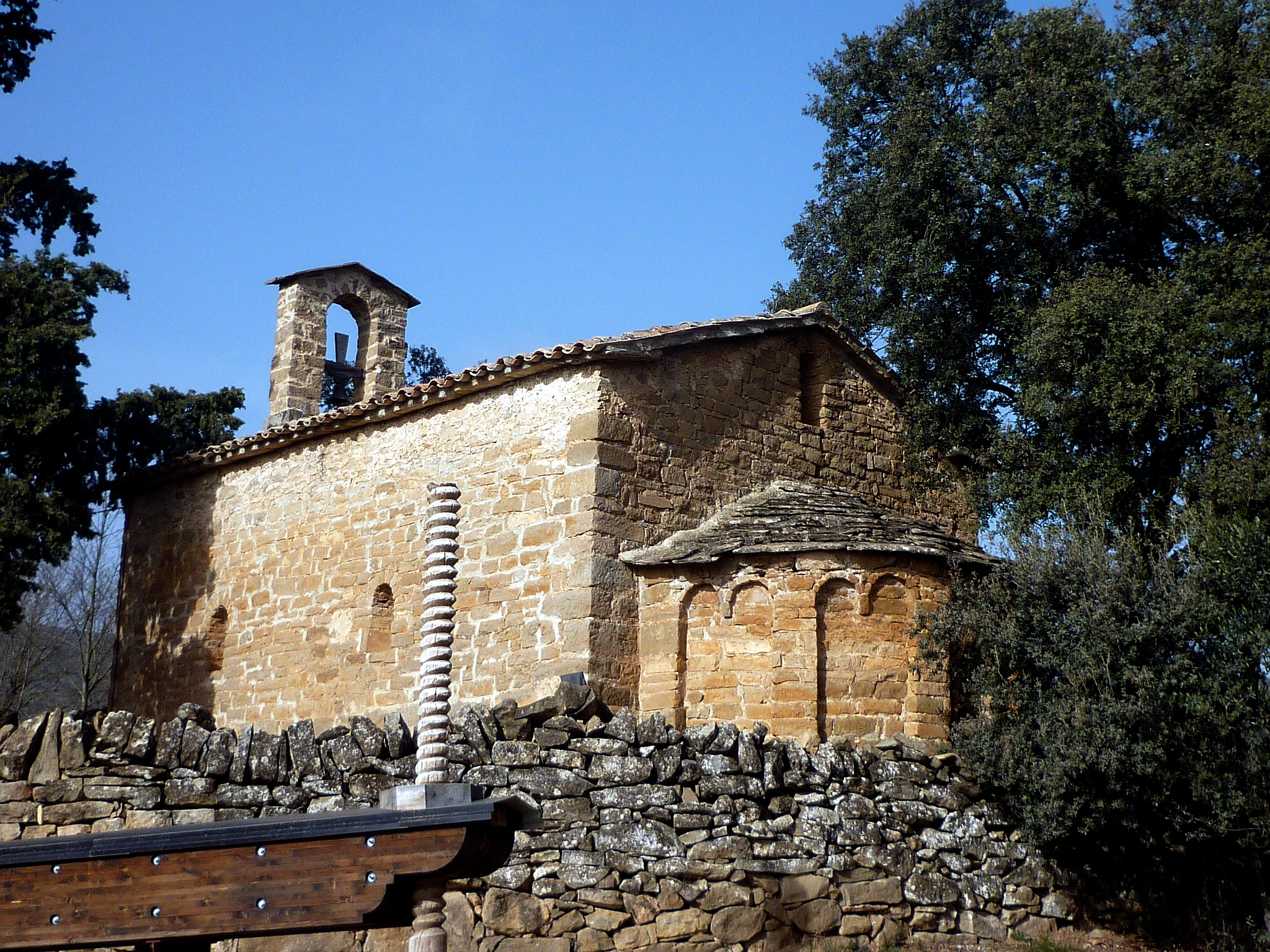

- Location within Province of Lleida Location within Catalonia Location within Spain
- Coordinates: 41°56′31″N 1°5′13″E
- Country: Spain
- Community: Catalonia
- Province: Lleida
- Municipality: Artesa de Segre

Population
  - Total: 8

Vall-Llebrerola is a hamlet located in the municipality of Artesa de Segre, in Province of Lleida province, Catalonia, Spain. As of 2020, it has a population of 8.

== Geography ==
Vall-Llebrerola is located 66km northeast of Lleida.
