= Colònia la Fàbrica =

- Locality
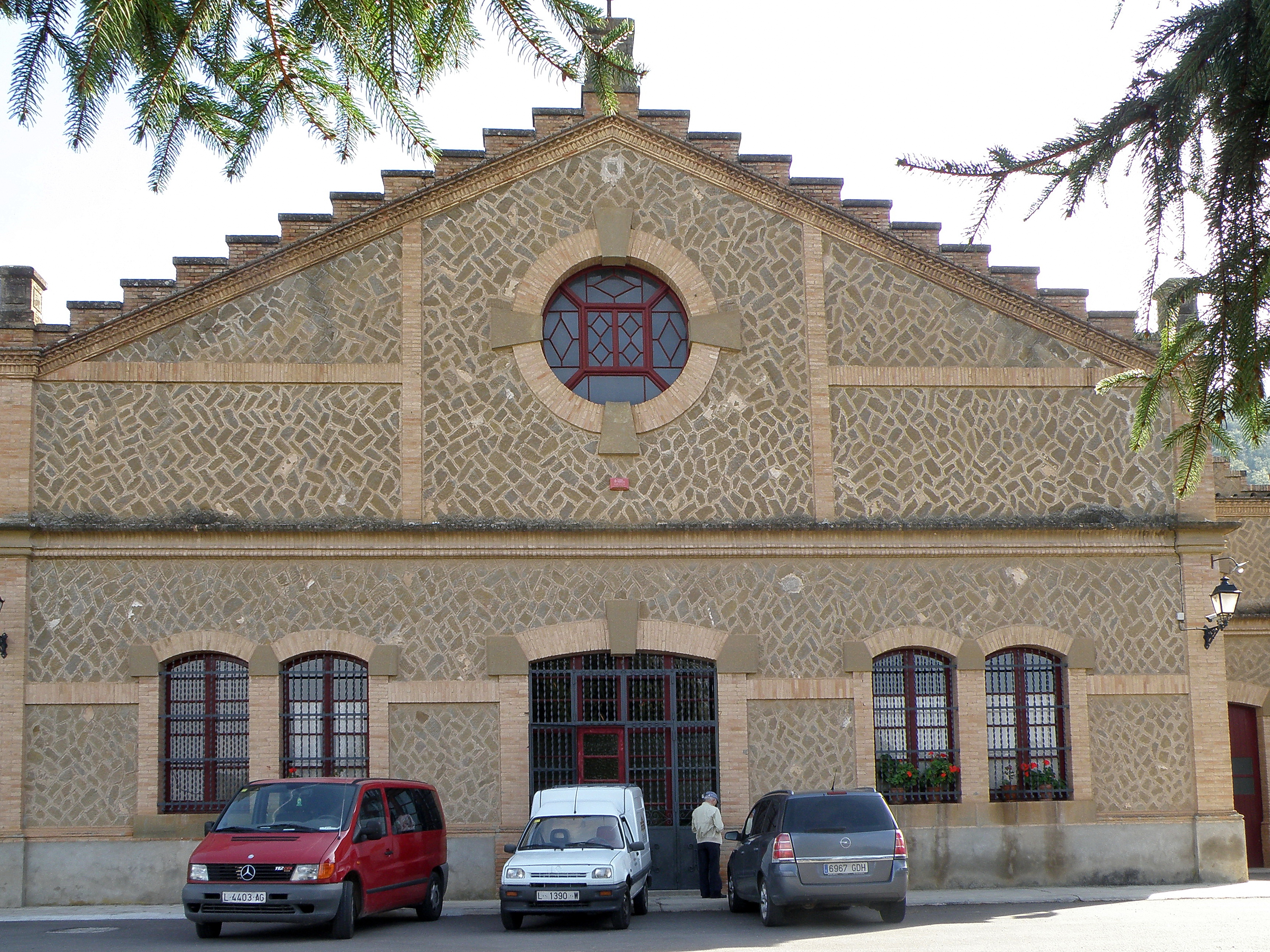

- Location within Province of Lleida Location within Catalonia Location within Spain
- Coordinates: 41°54′36″N 1°4′52″E
- Country: Spain
- Community: Catalonia
- Province: Lleida
- Municipality: Artesa de Segre

Population
  - Total: 58

Colònia la Fàbrica is a locality located in the municipality of Artesa de Segre, in Province of Lleida province, Catalonia, Spain. As of 2020, it has a population of 58.

== Geography ==
Colònia la Fàbrica is located 65km northeast of Lleida.
