= La Vedrenya =

- Locality
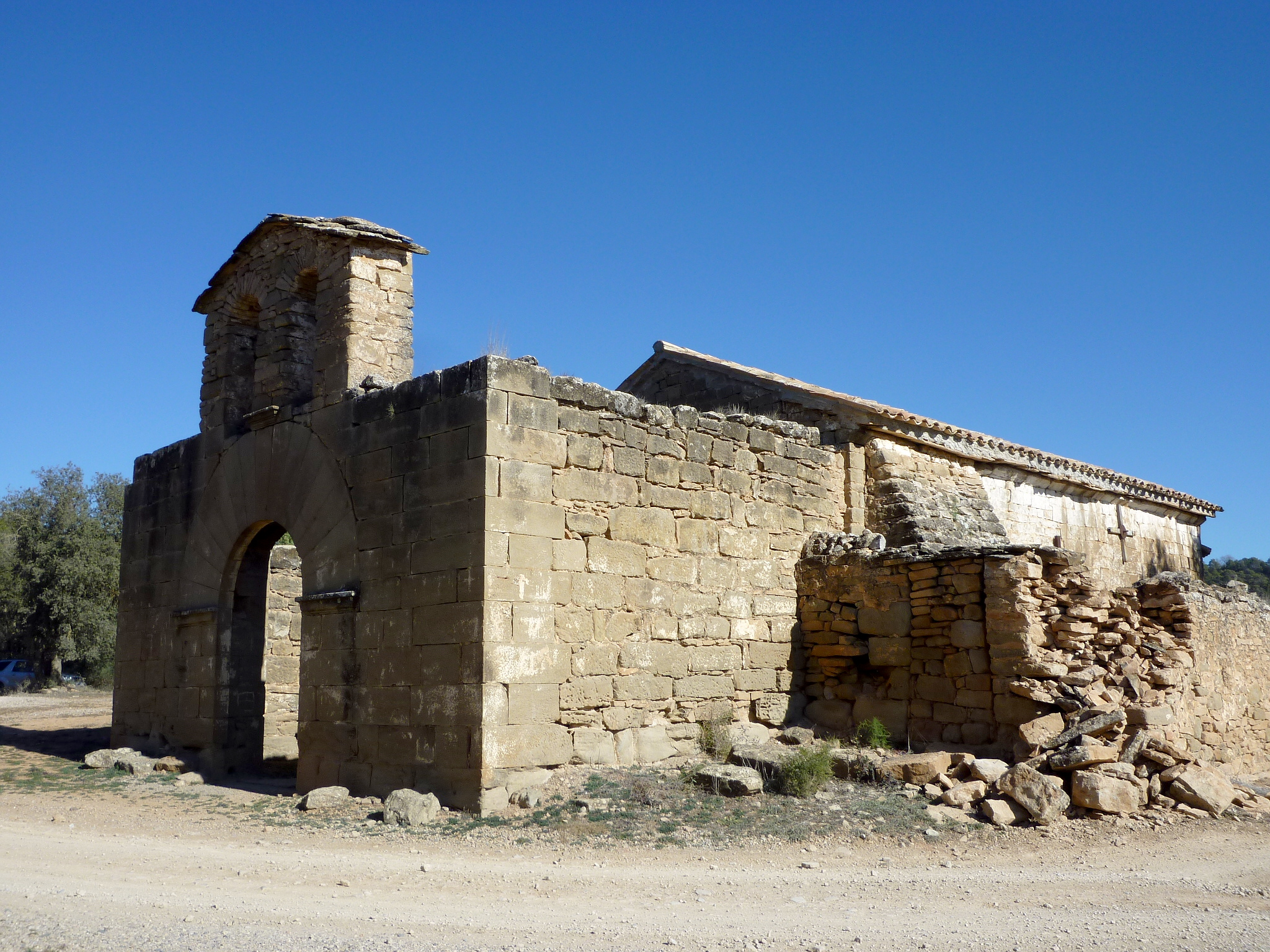

- Location within Province of Lleida Location within Catalonia Location within Spain
- Coordinates: 41°57′34″N 1°6′33″E
- Country: Spain
- Community: Catalonia
- Province: Lleida
- Municipality: Artesa de Segre
- Elevation: 482 m (1,581 ft)

Population
  - Total: 8

La Vedrenya is a hamlet located in the municipality of Artesa de Segre, in Province of Lleida province, Catalonia, Spain. As of 2020, it has a population of 8.

== Geography ==
La Vedrenya is located 70km northeast of Lleida.
