= Colldelrat =

- Locality
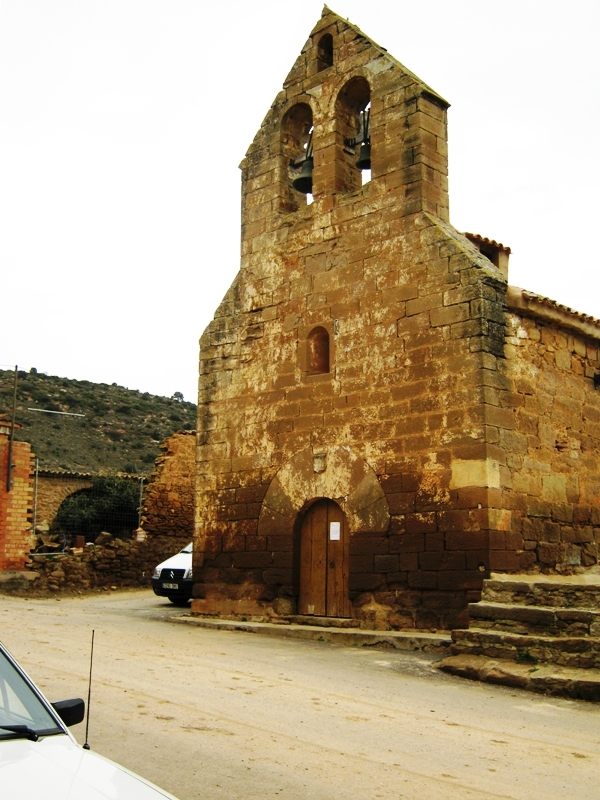

- Location within Province of Lleida Location within Catalonia Location within Spain
- Coordinates: 41°53′58″N 1°5′31″E
- Country: Spain
- Community: Catalonia
- Province: Lleida
- Municipality: Artesa de Segre
- Elevation: 497 m (1,631 ft)

Population
  - Total: 26

Colldelrat is a locality located in the municipality of Artesa de Segre, in Province of Lleida province, Catalonia, Spain. As of 2020, it has a population of 26.

== Geography ==
Colldelrat is located 65km northeast of Lleida.
