= Vall-Llebrera =

- Locality
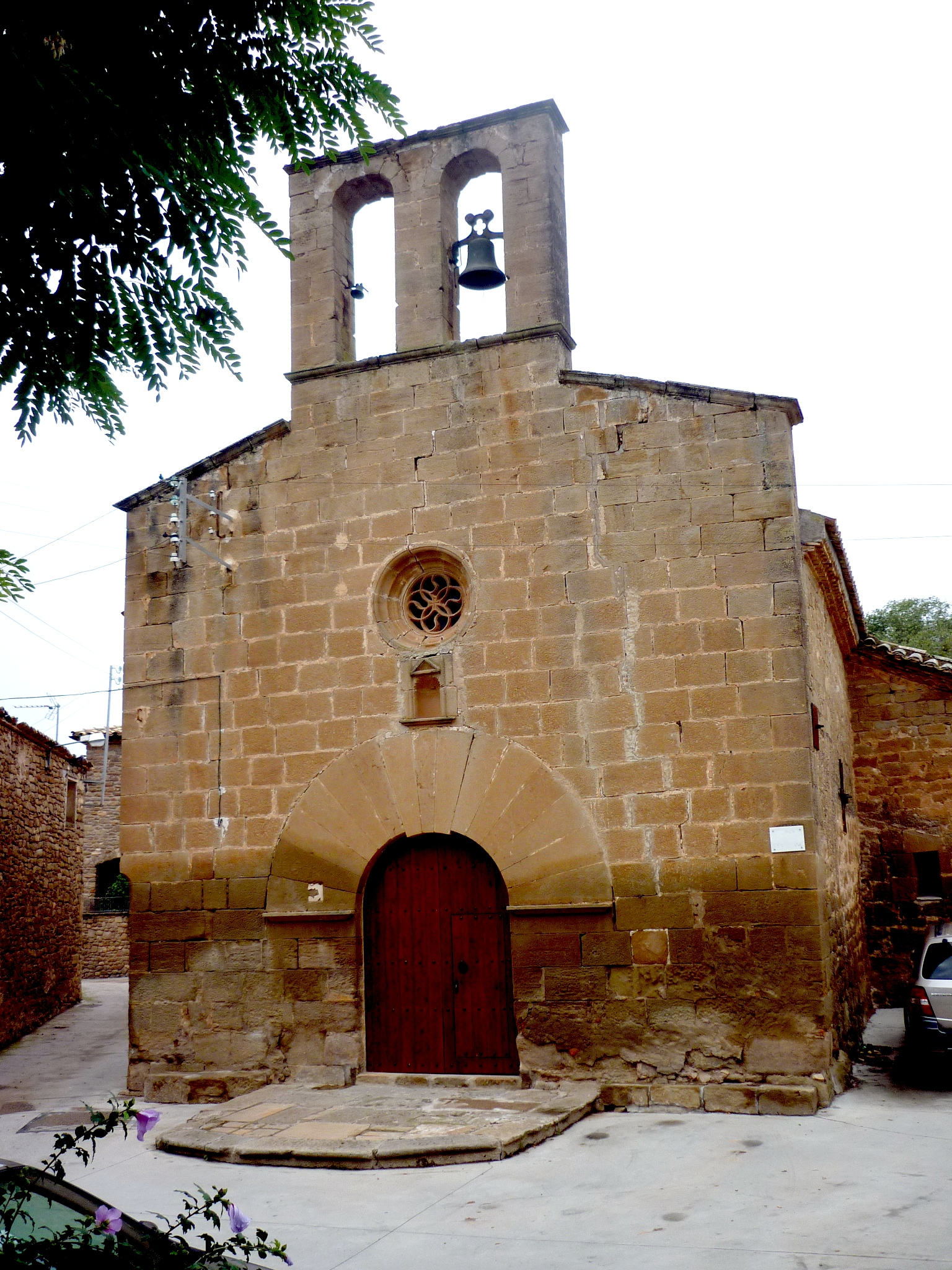

- Location within Province of Lleida Location within Catalonia Location within Spain
- Coordinates: 41°56′5″N 1°4′56″E
- Country: Spain
- Community: Catalonia
- Province: Lleida
- Municipality: Artesa de Segre
- Elevation: 368 m (1,207 ft)

Population
  - Total: 16

Vall-Llebrera is a locality located in the municipality of Artesa de Segre, in Province of Lleida province, Catalonia, Spain. As of 2020, it has a population of 16.

== Geography ==
Vall-Llebrera is located 66 km (41 mi) northeast of Lleida.
