= Sant Marc de Batlliu =

- Locality
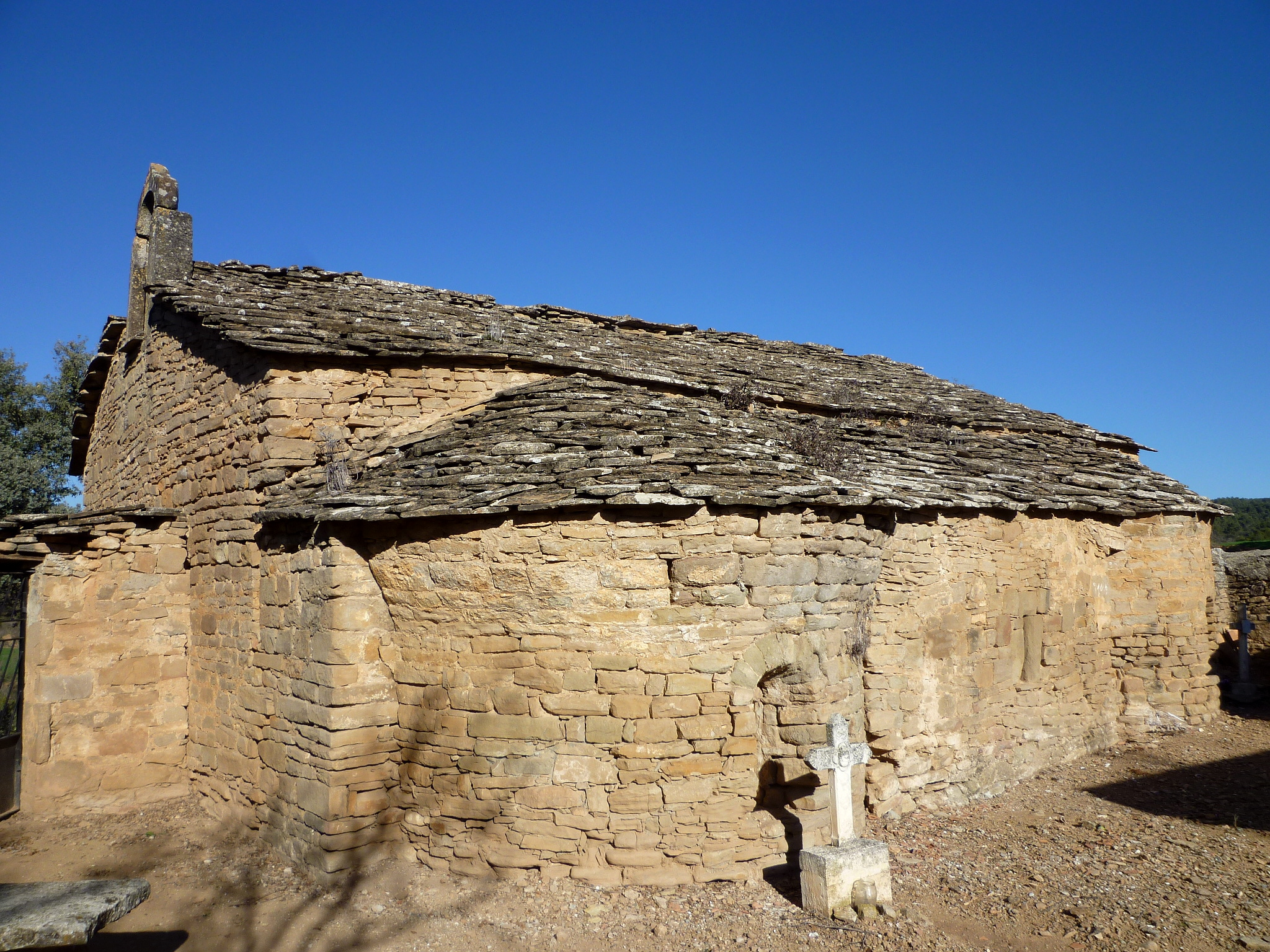

- Location within Province of Lleida Location within Catalonia Location within Spain
- Coordinates: 41°53′43″N 1°2′31″E
- Country: Spain
- Community: Catalonia
- Province: Lleida
- Municipality: Artesa de Segre

Population
  - Total: 9

Sant Marc de Batlliu is a locality located in the municipality of Artesa de Segre, in Province of Lleida province, Catalonia, Spain. As of 2020, it has a population of 9.

== Geography ==
Sant Marc de Batlliu is located 60km northeast of Lleida.
