= Collfred =

- Locality
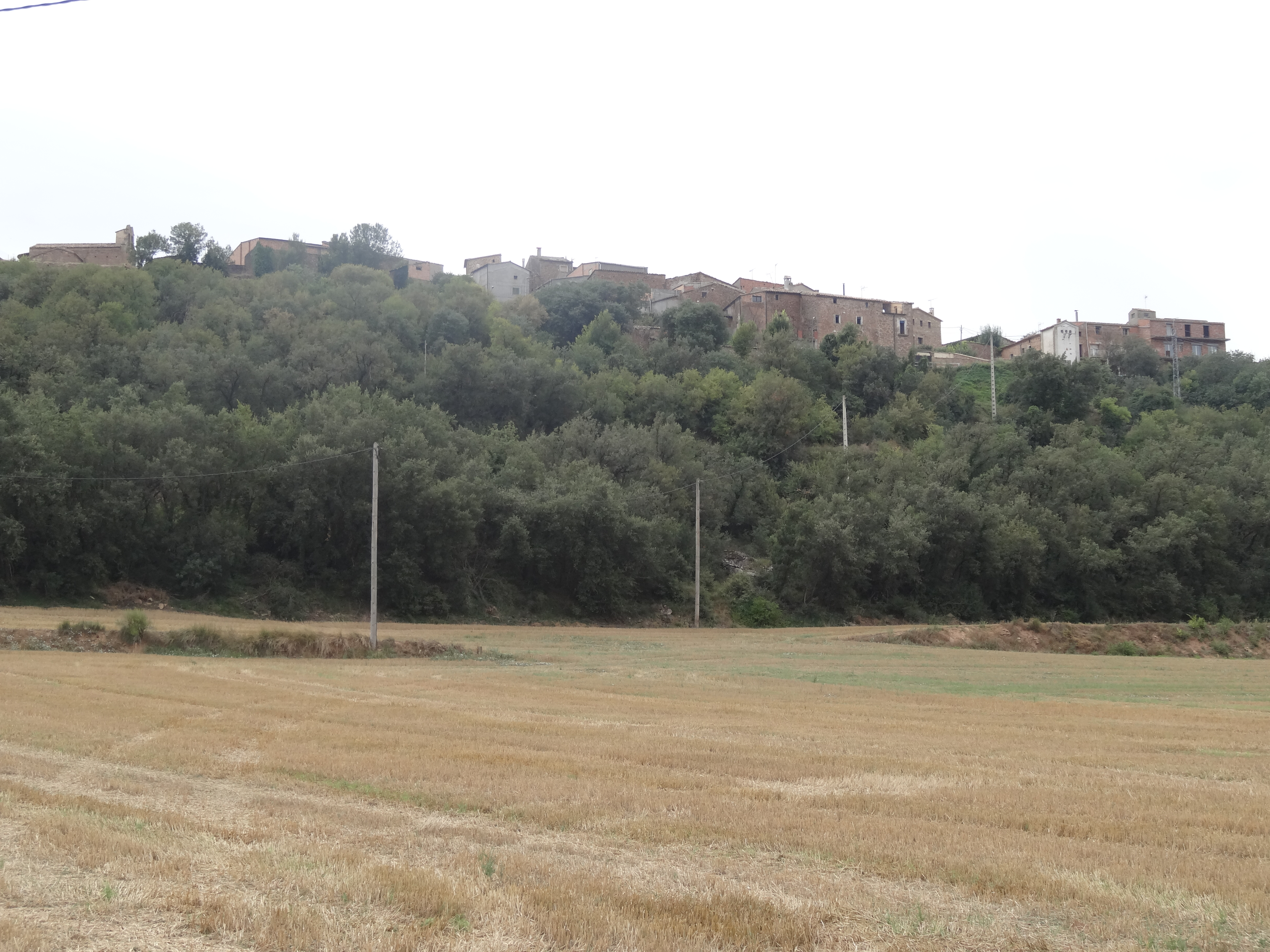

- Location within Province of Lleida Location within Catalonia Location within Spain
- Coordinates: 41°54′57″N 1°6′46″E
- Country: Spain
- Community: Catalonia
- Province: Lleida
- Municipality: Artesa de Segre
- Elevation: 395 m (1,296 ft)

Population
  - Total: 17

Collfred is a locality located in the municipality of Artesa de Segre, in Province of Lleida province, Catalonia, Spain. As of 2020, it has a population of 17.

== Geography ==
Collfred is located 67km northeast of Lleida.
