= La Clua =

- Locality
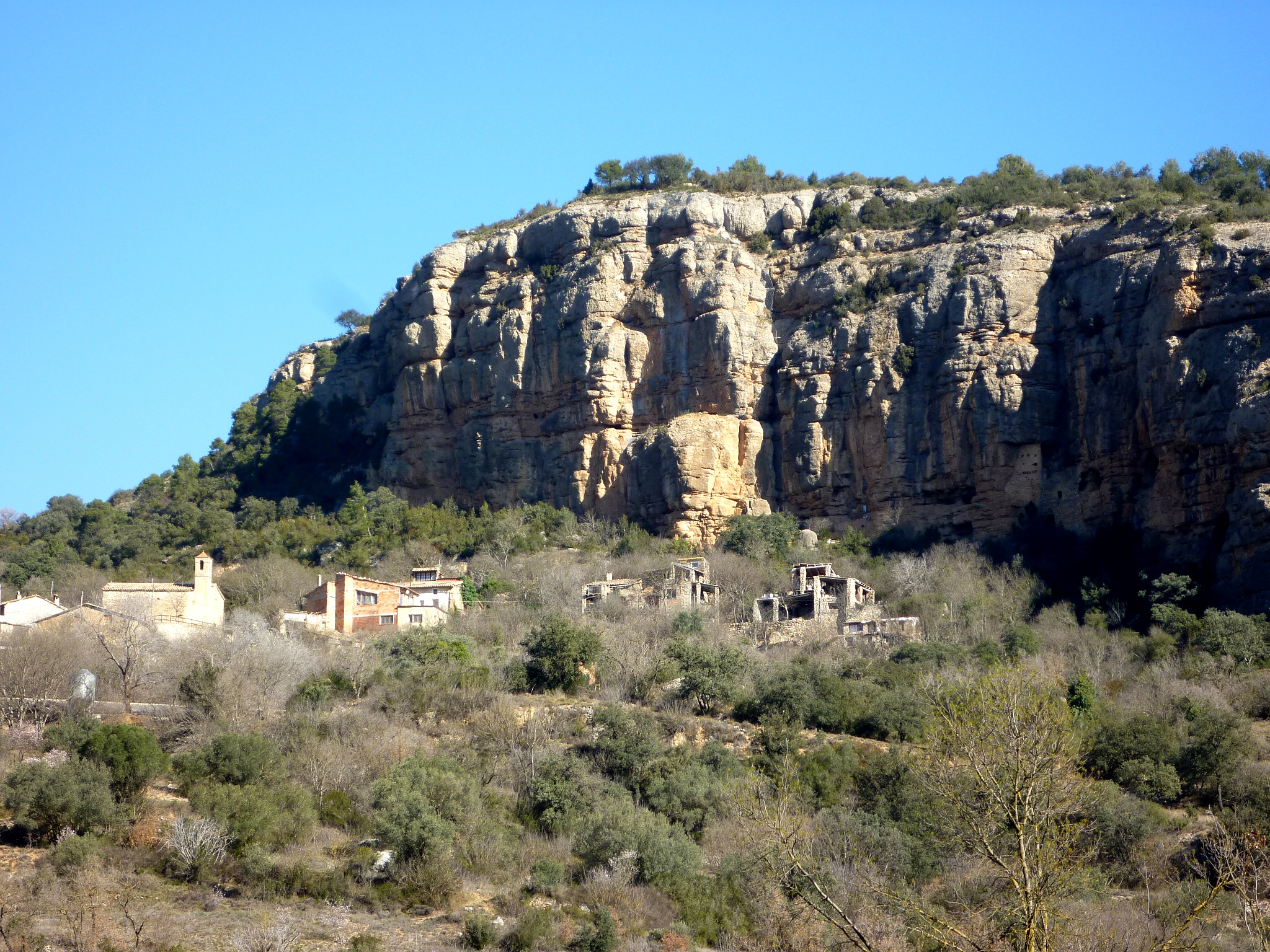

- Location within Province of Lleida Location within Catalonia Location within Spain
- Coordinates: 41°56′51″N 1°0′58″E
- Country: Spain
- Community: Catalonia
- Province: Lleida
- Municipality: Artesa de Segre
- Elevation: 543 m (1,781 ft)

Population
  - Total: 17

La Clua is a locality located in the municipality of Artesa de Segre, in Province of Lleida province, Catalonia, Spain. As of 2020, it has a population of 17.

== Geography ==
La Clua is located 69km northeast of Lleida.
