= Alentorn =

- Locality
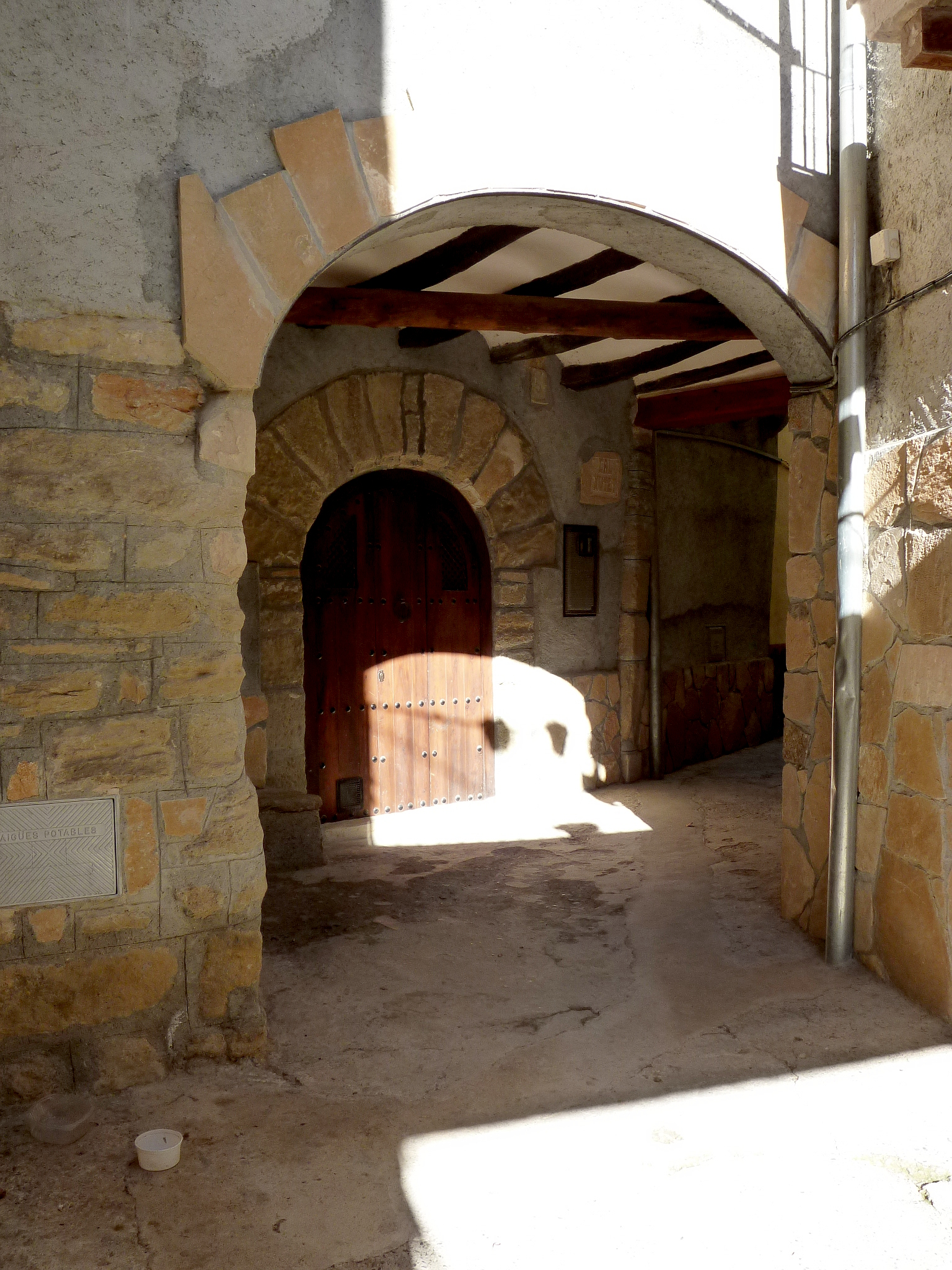

- Location within Province of Lleida Location within Catalonia Location within Spain
- Coordinates: 41°55′33″N 1°3′41″E
- Country: Spain
- Community: Catalonia
- Province: Lleida
- Municipality: Artesa de Segre
- Elevation: 394 m (1,293 ft)

Population
  - Total: 123

Alentorn is a locality located in the municipality of Artesa de Segre, in Province of Lleida province, Catalonia, Spain. As of 2020, it has a population of 123.

== Geography ==
Alentorn is located 65km northeast of Lleida.
