= Comiols =

- Locality
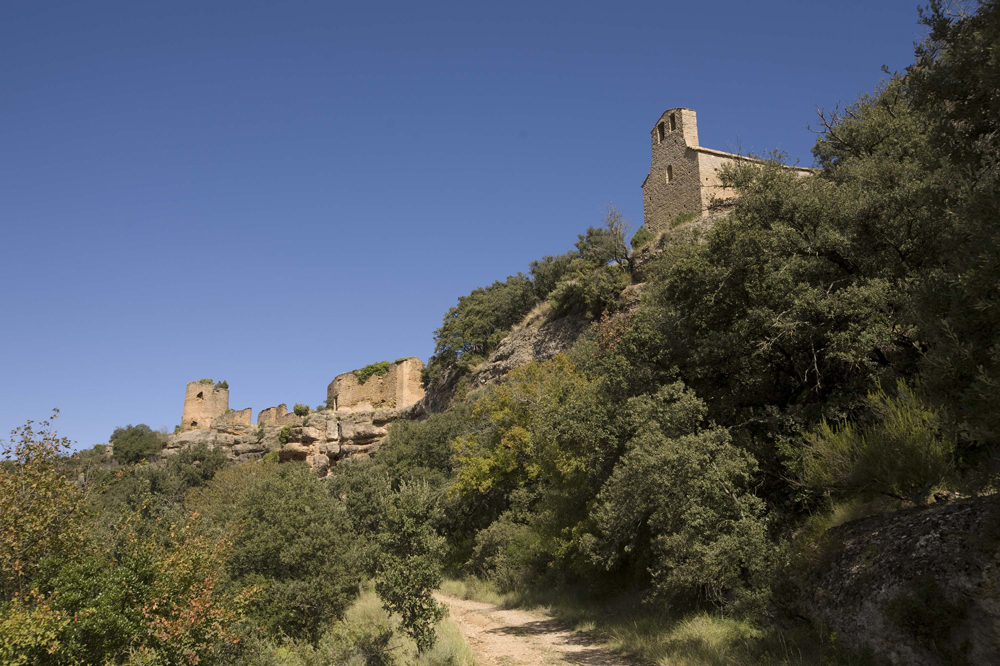

- Location within Province of Lleida Location within Catalonia Location within Spain
- Coordinates: 42°1′31″N 1°6′5″E
- Country: Spain
- Community: Catalonia
- Province: Lleida
- Municipality: Artesa de Segre
- Elevation: 944 m (3,097 ft)

Population
  - Total: 7

Comiols is a hamlet located in the municipality of Artesa de Segre, in Province of Lleida province, Catalonia, Spain. As of 2020, it has a population of 7.

== Geography ==
Comiols is located 84km northeast of Lleida.
