= Folquer =

- Locality
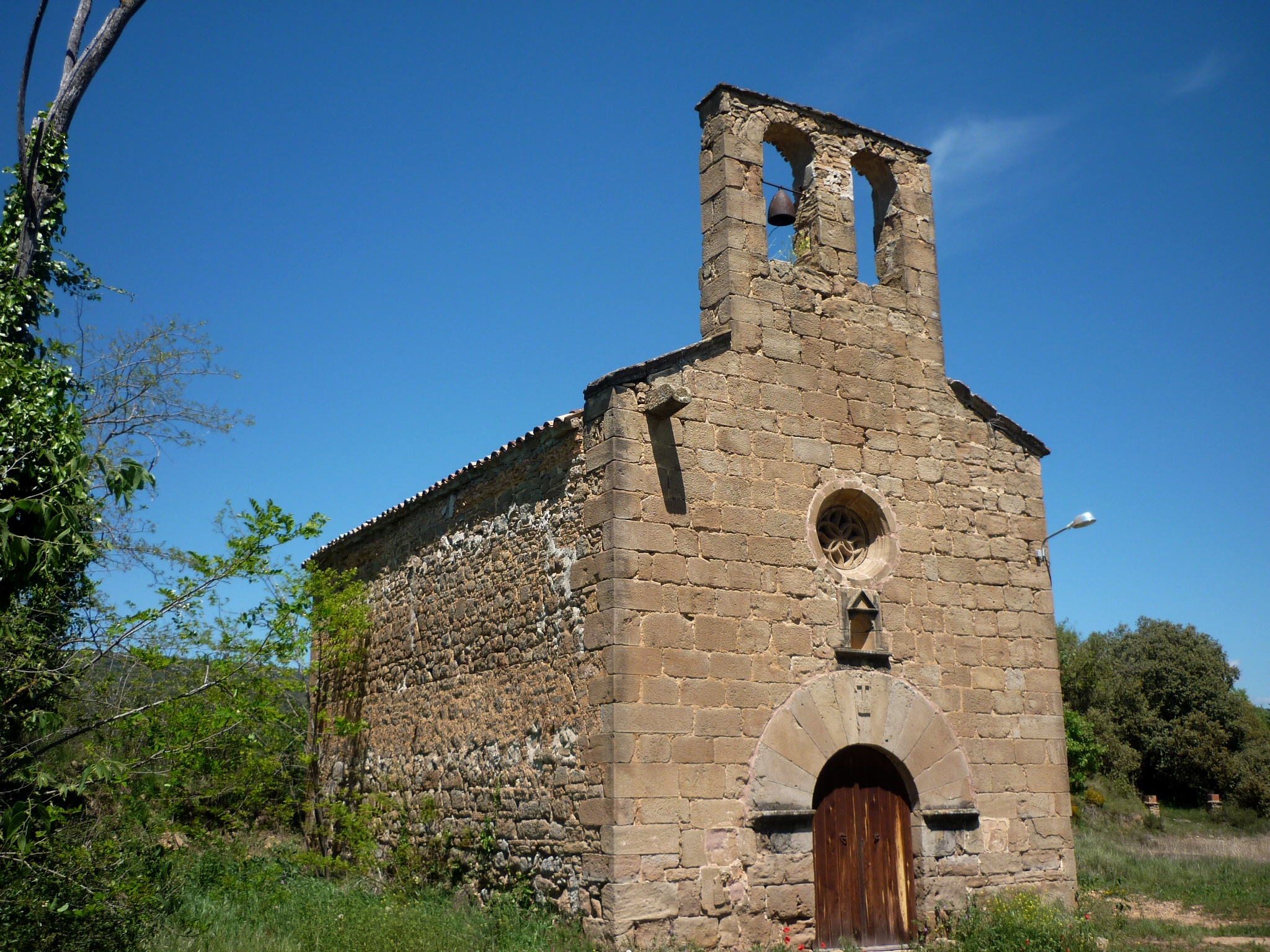

- Location within Province of Lleida Location within Catalonia Location within Spain
- Coordinates: 42°0′53″N 1°6′50″E
- Country: Spain
- Community: Catalonia
- Province: Lleida
- Municipality: Artesa de Segre
- Elevation: 735 m (2,411 ft)

Population
  - Total: 5

Folquer is a hamlet located in the municipality of Artesa de Segre, in Province of Lleida province, Catalonia, Spain. As of 2020, it has a population of 5.

== Geography ==
Folquer is located 76km northeast of Lleida.
