= Vilves =

- Locality
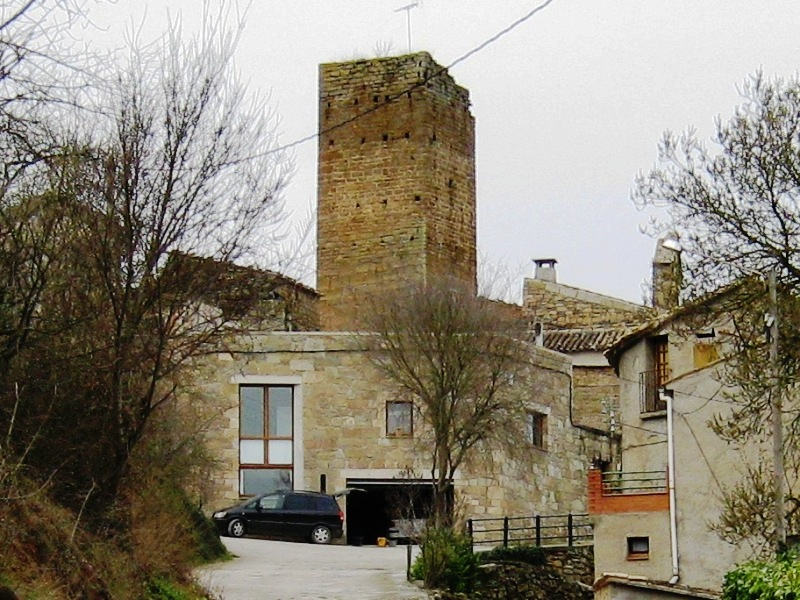

- Location within Province of Lleida Location within Catalonia Location within Spain
- Coordinates: 41°55′4″N 1°4′56″E
- Country: Spain
- Community: Catalonia
- Province: Lleida
- Municipality: Artesa de Segre
- Elevation: 344 m (1,129 ft)

Population
  - Total: 25

Vilves is a locality located in the municipality of Artesa de Segre, in Province of Lleida province, Catalonia, Spain. As of 2020, it has a population of 25.

== Geography ==
Vilves is located 64km northeast of Lleida.
