= Pic Petit de Segre =

Mountain in Catalonia, France, and Spain

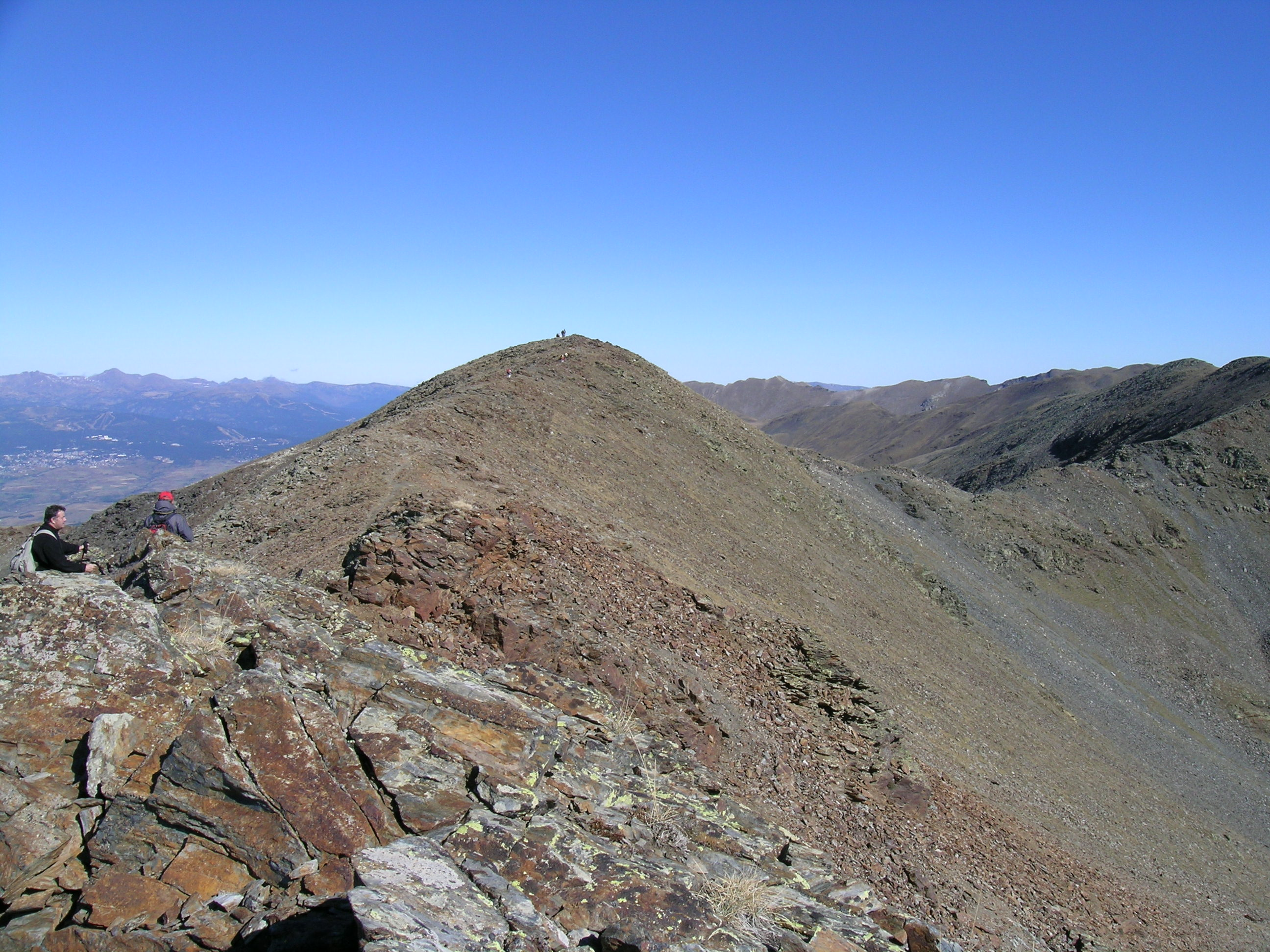

Highest point
- Elevation: 2,810.5 m (9,221 ft)
- Coordinates: 42°23′38.82″N 2°6′53.28″E

Geography
- Location within Pyrenees
- Location: Queralbs (Ripollès); Llo (French Cerdagne)
- Parent range: Pyrenees

Climbing
- First ascent: Unknown
- Easiest route: From Vall de Núria

Pic Petit de Segre or Puigmal Petit del Segre is a mountain of Catalonia, France and Spain. Located in the Pyrenees, it has an elevation of 2,810 metres above sea level.

== See also ==
- Pic del Segre
- Mountains of Catalonia
