= Vernet (Artesa de Segre) =

- Locality
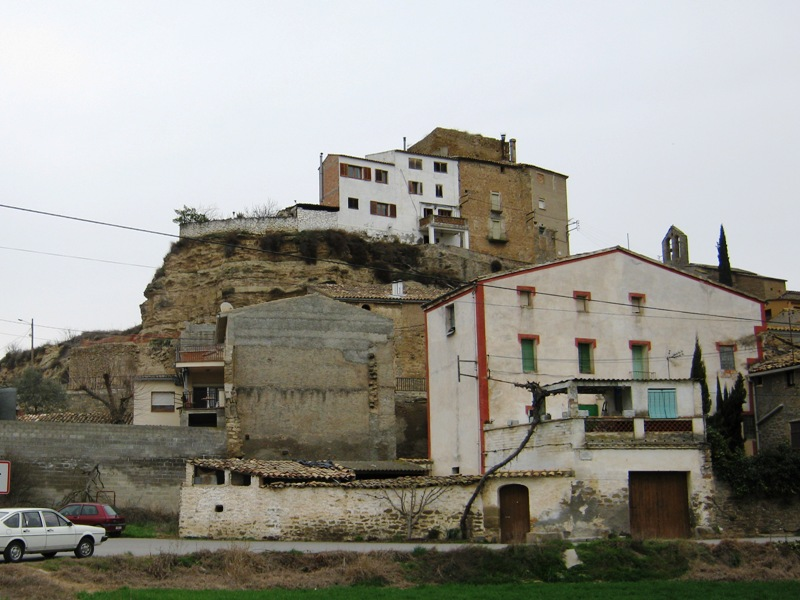

- Location within Province of Lleida Location within Catalonia Location within Spain
- Coordinates: 41°54′17″N 1°2′28″E
- Country: Spain
- Community: Catalonia
- Province: Lleida
- Municipality: Artesa de Segre
- Elevation: 319 m (1,047 ft)

Population
  - Total: 22

Vernet is a locality located in the municipality of Artesa de Segre, in Province of Lleida province, Catalonia, Spain. As of 2020, it has a population of 22.

== Geography ==
Vernet is located 61 km northeast of Lleida.
