= Pic del Segre =

- Puigmal del Segre
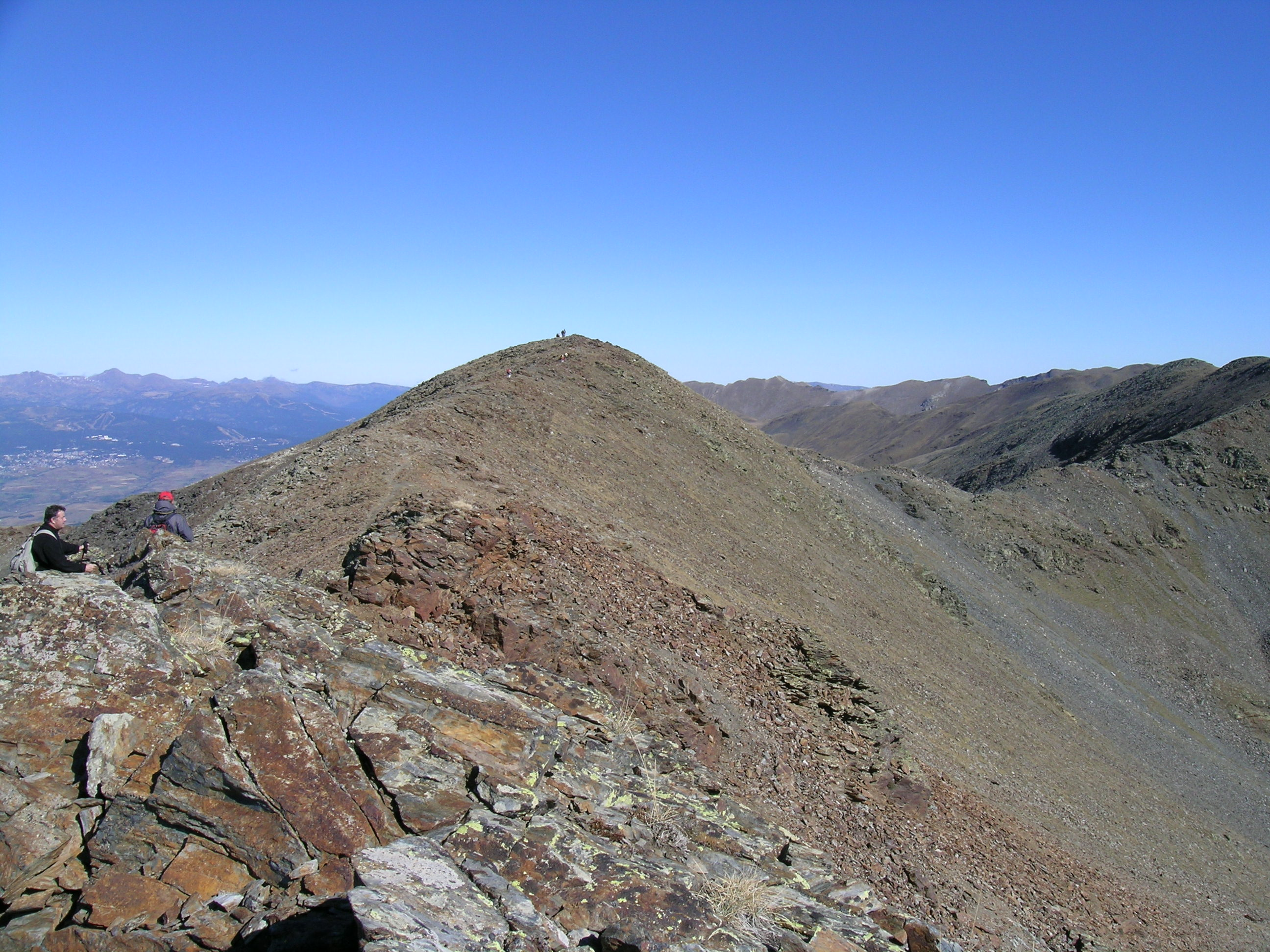

Highest point
- Elevation: 2,843 m (9,327 ft)
- Listing: Mountains of Catalonia
- Coordinates: 42°23′49.35″N 2°07′16.7″E

Geography
- Location within Pyrenees
- Location: Queralbs, Ripollès, Catalonia, Spain; Llo, Pyrénées-Orientales, France
- Parent range: Pyrenees

Climbing
- First ascent: Unknown
- Easiest route: From Vall de Núria

Pic del Segre or Puigmal del Segre is a mountain of France and Spain. Located in the Pyrenees, close to Vall de Núria it has an elevation of 2,843 metres (9,327 ft) above sea level. The Segre River has its source by this peak.

== See also ==
- Pic Petit de Segre
