= Segre (surname) =

Segre, Segrè or Segré is a Jewish-Italian surname, possibly tracing back to Sephardi communities from the area of the Segre River, Spain, or to the French town of Segré; it is concentrated in the areas of Turin, Milan and Rome. Notable people with the surname include:

- Andrea Segre (born 1976), Italian film director
- Beniamino Segre (1903–1977), Italian mathematician
- Bruno Segre (1918–2024), Italian lawyer, journalist, politician and partisan
- Cesare Segre (1928–2014), Italian philologist, semiotician and literary critic
- Corrado Segre (1863–1924), Italian mathematician
- Dino Segre (1893–1975), known as Pitigrilli, Italian journalist and novelist
- Emilio Segrè (1905–1989), Italian-American chemist, physicist and Nobel laureate
- Giacomo Segre (1839–1894), Italian military officer
- Gino Segrè (born 1938), Italian-American physicist and academic
- Guido Segre (1881–1945), Jewish Italian entrepreneur and member of the Fascist Party
- Jacob Segrè, American distance runner
- Jacopo Segre (born 1997), Italian footballer
- Julie Segre, American geneticist
- Liliana Segre (born 1930), Italian Holocaust survivor and senator for life
- Luigi Segre (1919–1963), Italian automobile designer
- Paul Segre, American business executive
- Sion Segre Amar (1910–2003), Italian Holocaust survivor and writer
