= Artesa de Segre =

- Municipality
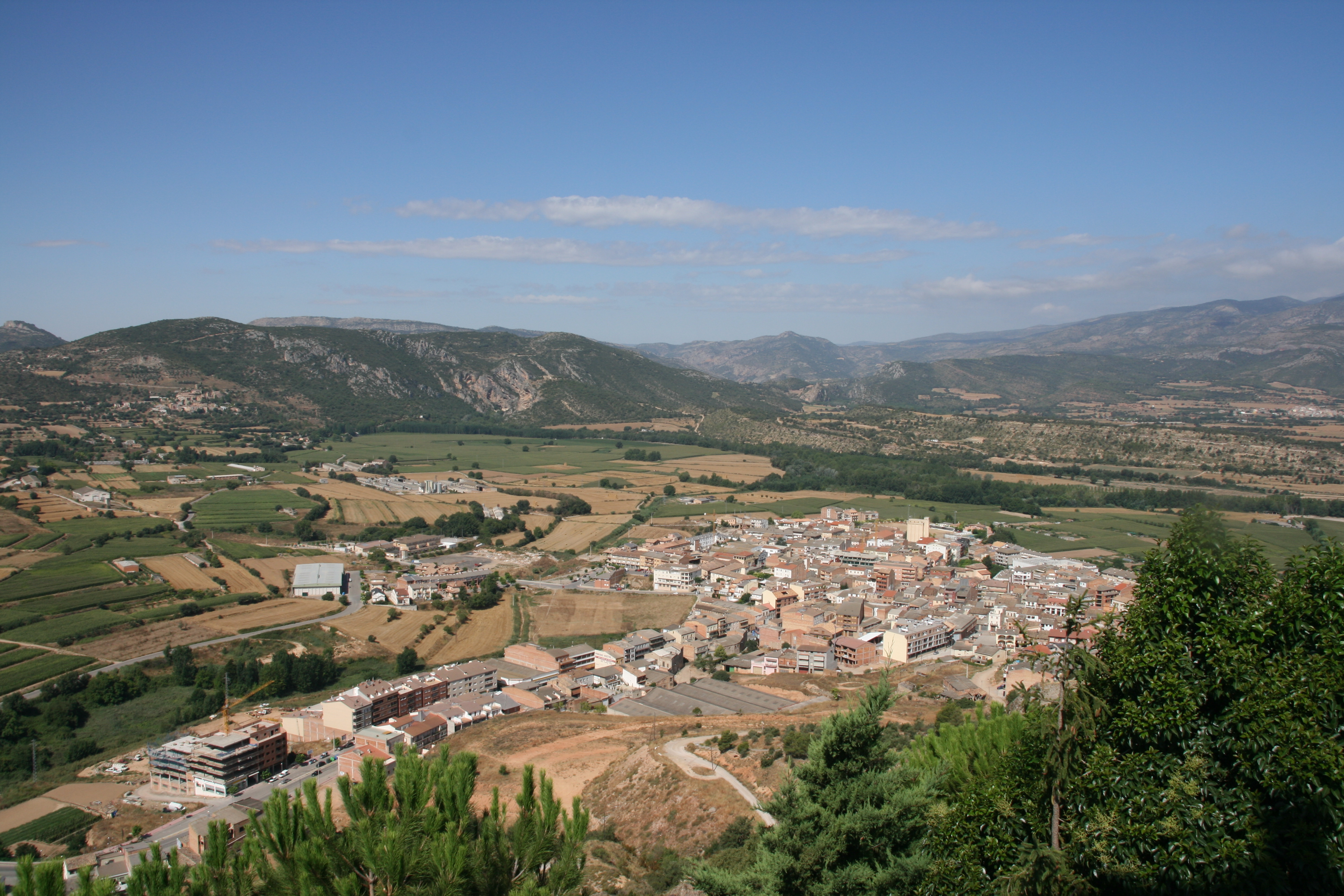
- Artesa de Segre

- Location in Catalonia
- Coordinates: 41°53′50″N 1°02′56″E
- Country: Spain
- Community: Catalonia
- Province: Lleida
- Comarca: Noguera

Government
  - Mayor: Mingo Sabanés Porta (2015)

Area
  - Total: 175.9 km^{2} (67.9 sq mi)
- Elevation: 394 m (1,293 ft)

Population (2025-01-01)
  - Total: 3,559
  - Density: 20.23/km^{2} (52.40/sq mi)
- Demonym(s): Artesenc, artesenca
- Website: www.ccnoguera.cat/artesadesegre

Artesa de Segre (Catalan pronunciation: [aɾˈteza ðe ˈseɣɾe]) is a municipality in the comarca of the Noguera in Catalonia, Spain. It is situated in the valley of the Segre river, between Ponts and Balaguer. The municipal territory extends as far as the confluence of the Segre with the Boix. The Urgell canal runs through the municipality to the south of the Segre. The municipality is served by the C-1313 road between Balaguer and Ponts, and is linked to Agramunt by the L-302 road.

It has a population of 3,559 (register office, 2025).

== Demography ==
| 1900 | 1930 | 1950 | 1970 | 1986 | 2007 |
|---|---|---|---|---|---|
| 4712 | 4901 | 4600 | 3541 | 3250 | 3737 |

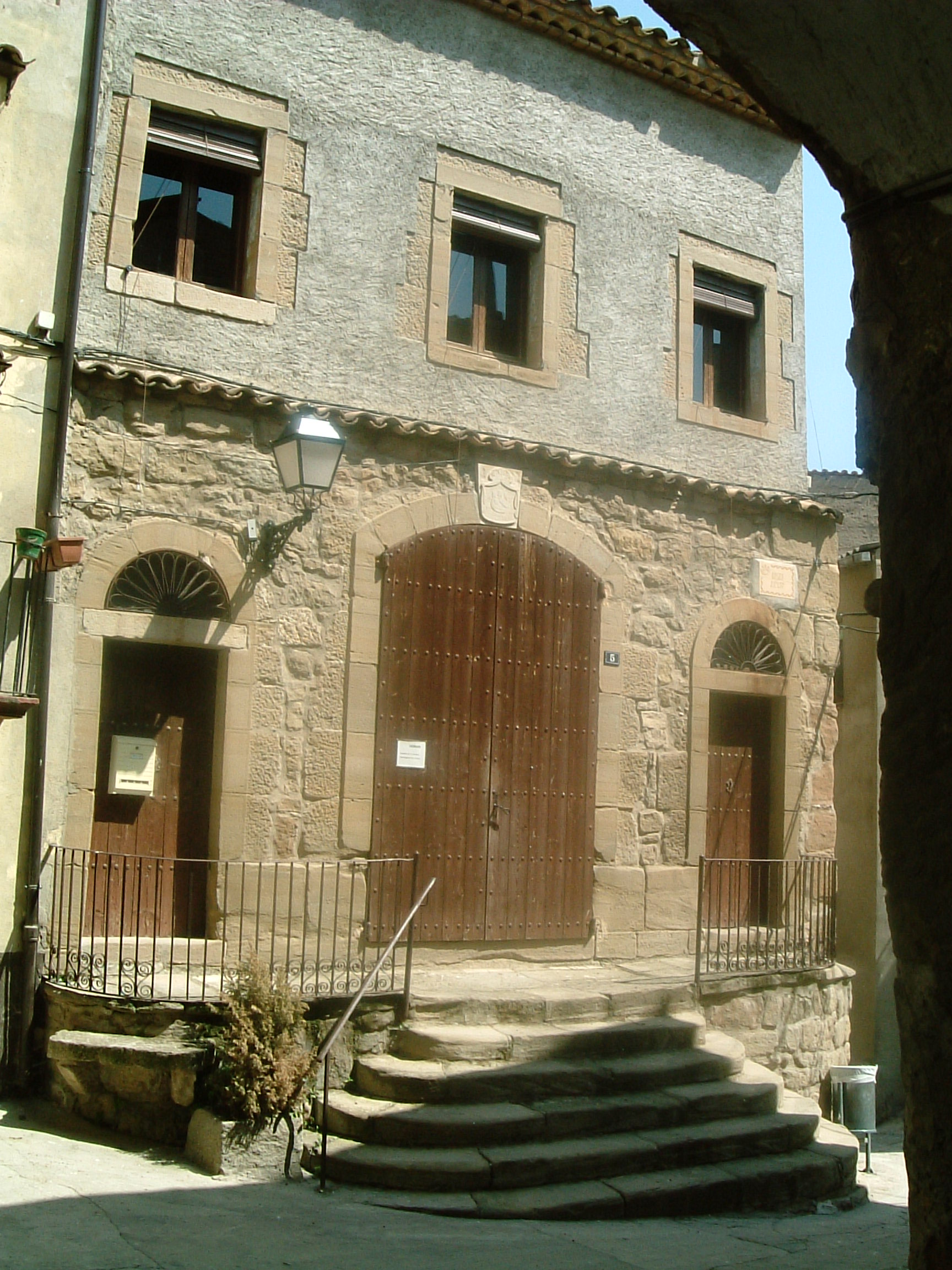
Artesa de Segre Museum

== Subdivisions ==
The municipality of Artesa de Segre include nineteen outlying villages: populations are given as of 2005.

- Alentorn (143)
- Anya (32)
- Baldomar (127)
- La Clua (19)
- Colldelrat (33)
- Collfred (29)
- Colònia la Fàbrica
- Comiols (7)
- Folquer (4)
- Montargull (57)
- Montmagastre (22)
- El Pont d'Alentorn (31)
- Sant Marc del Batlliu (20)
- Seró (93)
- Tudela de Segre (108)
- La Vall d'Ariet
- Vall-Llebrera(35)
- Vall-Llebrerola
- La Vedrenya (15)
- Vernet (42)
- Vilves (58)
