= Tudela de Segre =

- Locality
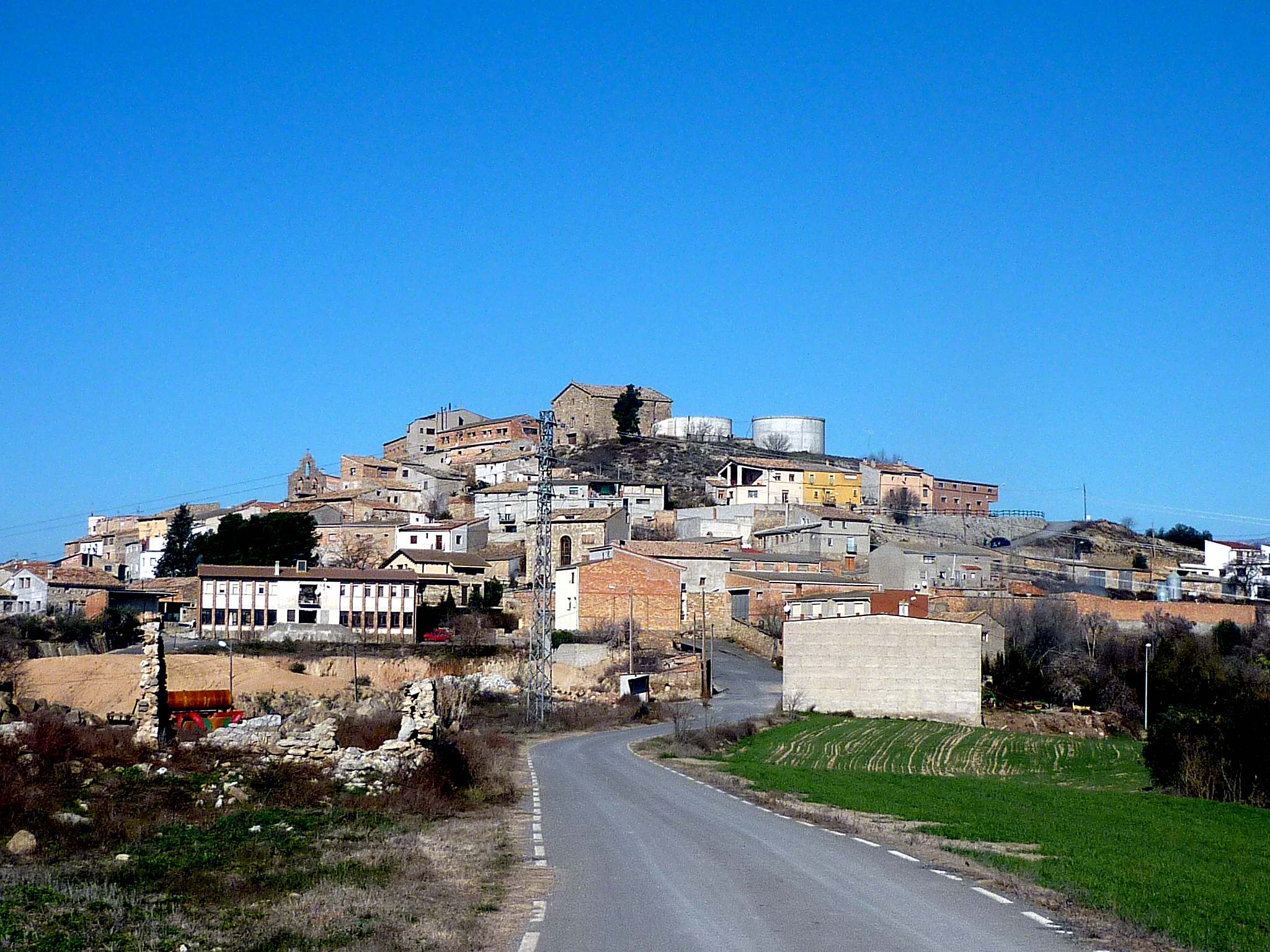

- Location within Province of Lleida Location within Catalonia Location within Spain
- Coordinates: 41°52′16″N 1°5′3″E
- Country: Spain
- Community: Catalonia
- Province: Lleida
- Municipality: Artesa de Segre
- Elevation: 451 m (1,480 ft)

Population
  - Total: 67

Tudela de Segre is a locality located in the municipality of Artesa de Segre, in Province of Lleida province, Catalonia, Spain. As of 2020, it has a population of 67.

== Geography ==
Tudela de Segre is located 63km east-northeast of Lleida.
