= 5th Division (Spain) =

- 5.ª División
- Active: 31 December 1936–27 March 1939
- Country: Spanish Republic
- Allegiance: (Second Spanish Republic) Republican faction
- Branch: Spanish Republican Army
- Type: Infantry
- Size: Division
- Garrison/HQ: El Pardo
- Engagements: Spanish Civil War: Siege of Madrid; Levante Offensive

Commanders
- Notable commanders: Juan Perea Capulino

The 5th Division was one of the divisions of the People's Army of the Republic that were organized during the Spanish Civil War on the basis of the Mixed Brigades. It was deployed on the Madrid and Levante fronts.

== History ==
The unit was created on 31 December 1936, within the Madrid Army Corps. It covered the second sector of the Madrid front, from the El Pardo wall to the Manzanares river. It had its headquarters in the Palace of El Pardo. The division was made up of the 5th, 38th and 39th mixed brigades, with 8,166 troops and nine pieces of artillery.

The 5th Division played an important role during the Third Battle of the Corunna Road, defending the accesses to Madrid, the San Fernando Bridge and the El Pardo mountain. Later the unit became part of the II Army Corps, and later in the VI Army Corps, remaining at the Madrid front.

In the spring of 1938, José Miaja sent it to the Levante front to reinforce the republican forces that were resisting the nationalist offensive. The 5th Division, located between the 25th and 39th, maintained its defensive positions and managed to avoid the defeat of the republican units deployed in the Maestrazgo area. The unit maintained the resistance in this area for several weeks, suffering severe wear and tear. Subsequently, the 5th Division went to the XIX Army Corps, standing out in the resistance against the nationalist Army Corps de Navarra in Campillo.

During the rest of the war, it did not take part in relevant military operations.

== Command ==
Commanders

- Juan Perea Capulino (Dec. 1936 - April 1937);
- Miguel Palacios Martínez (April 1937 - April 1938);
- José Penido Iglesias (April 1938 - Feb. 1939).

Commissars

- Tomás Sanz Asensio, of the CNT;

Chiefs of Staff

- Joaquín Martí Sánchez;
- Francisco Garrido Romero;
- Paulino García Puente;
- Juan Miguel Mari;

== Organization ==
Date	Attached Army Corps	Integrated Mixed Brigades	Battle front
December 1936	Madrid Army Corps	5th, 38th and 39th	Center
March 1937	II Army Corps	21st, 38th and 39th	Center
7 April 1937	VI Army Corps	39th and 48th	Center
December 1937	VI Army Corps	39th, 48th and 112th	Center
12 May 1938	XIII Army Corps	28th, 39th, 16th and 97th	Levante
9 June 1938	XIX Army Corps	2nd, 28th and 97th	Levante
18 June 1938	XIX Army Corps	2nd, 28th and 39th	Levante

== Bibliography ==
- Alpert, Michael (2013). The Republican Army in the Spanish Civil War, 1936-1939. Cambridge University Press. ISBN 9781107028739.
- Álvarez, Santiago (1989). Los comisarios políticos en el Ejército Popular de la República (in Spanish). Ediciós do Castro.
- Engel, Carlos (1999). Historia de las Brigadas Mixtas del Ejército Popular de la República (in Spanish). Madrid, Almena. 84-922644-7-0.
- Juan Navarro, Ramón (2010). Resistir es vencer. El frente de Viver en la Guerra Civil española (in Spanish). Lulu.com. ISBN 978-1-4466-9664-4.
- Martínez Bande, José Manuel (1977). La ofensiva sobre Valencia (in Spanish). Madrid: Editorial San Martín.
- Martínez Bande, José Manuel (1981). La batalla de Pozoblanco y el cierre de la bolsa de Mérida (in Spanish). Editorial San Martín.
- VV.AA. (1990). Historia general de España y América XVII. La segunda república y la guerra civil (in Spanish). Madrid: Ediciones Rialp.
- Zaragoza, Cristóbal (1983). Ejército Popular y Militares de la República, 1936-1939 (in Spanish). Barcelona: Ed. Planeta.
