= 150th Division =

In military terms, 150th Division or 150th Infantry Division may refer to:

- 150th Division (1st Formation) (People's Republic of China)
- 150th Division (2nd Formation) (People's Republic of China)
- 150th Division (3rd Formation) (People's Republic of China)
- 150th Division (Imperial Japanese Army)
- 150th Guards Motor Rifle Division, Russia
- 150th Motor Rifle Division, Soviet Union, later the 150th Training Motor Rifle Division
- 150th Rifle Division, Soviet Union

== See also ==
- List of military divisions by number
- 150th Brigade (disambiguation)
- 150th Regiment (disambiguation)
- 150th Air Refueling Squadron
- 150th (disambiguation)
