= 150th =

150th is the ordinal form of the number 150. 150th or One hundred and fiftieth may also refer to:

- A fraction, 1/150, equal to one of 150 equal parts
- Ferrari 150º Italia, a Formula One racing car

== Geography ==
- 150th meridian east, a line of longitude
- 150th meridian west, a line of longitude

== Military ==
- 150th Brigade (disambiguation)
- 150th Division (disambiguation)
- 150th Regiment (disambiguation)

== See also ==
- May 30, 150th day of the year in a standard year
