= Juan Perea Capulino =

Spanish military personnel (1890–1967)

Juan Perea Capulino (1890–1967) was a prominent Spanish soldier, who participated in the Spanish Civil War on the Republican side. Originally a private, he became a General and commanded the Eastern Army in the final phase of the war, an action for which he is most remembered.

== Biography ==
Born in Santa Cruz de Tenerife, he joined the army at 16 as a private. At the age of 27 he became a lieutenant. He fought during the Rif War in Morocco, where he spent 15 years. Seriously injured, he requested to be transferred to the continent. He participated in the failed 1926 Sanjuanada plot to overthrow the dictator Miguel Primo de Rivera and was sentenced to six years in prison in Montjuïc Castle. Released in 1932, he retired from the army with the rank of captain.

After the Spanish coup of July 1936, he returned to service to defend the Second Spanish Republic. His first action took place in the Sierra de Guadarrama. In September, he fought at Lozoya where the losses on both sides were very high. He was promoted to Commander on 6 August 1936.

On 6 December 1936, he supported the troops of José María Galán in the Pozuelo de Alarcón sector. He did not participate in the Second Battle of the Corunna Road (13-19 December) because the XI International Brigade supported all attacks at Boadilla del Monte. On 31 December, he was appointed leader of the 5th Division, which defended the road to La Coruña, north of Madrid. The 5th Division took part in the Third Battle of the Corunna Road (2–16 January 1937), containing the enemy troops advancing towards Madrid, with heavy losses. In April 1936 he commanded the IV Corps until October 1937.

On 23 October 1937 he participated in the Battle of Teruel. He was promoted to the rank of Lieutenant Colonel for his brilliant performance at the head of the XXI Corps in the midst of the Republican disaster in Aragon.

On 30 March 1938 he left the leadership of the XXI Corps, to replace Sebastián Pozas Perea at the head of the Eastern Army, which was completely disorganized and in full disarray. He could not avoid losing Lérida in early April, but he put an end to the Nationalist offensive towards the Noguera Pallaresa river.

When the Nationalist Offensive against Catalonia was unleashed in December 1938, the units of his Army of the East showed great cohesion, but they finally had to give up their positions and undertake the withdrawal towards the north. On 15 January 1939, he was promoted to Colonel, and crossed the French border at the beginning of February with the remains of his troops and thousands of fleeing civilians.

After the end of the civil war he went into exile in Mexico in 1942, where he participated in anti-Franco organizations, trying to keep the spirit of the Republic alive. Promoted to General, he died of a heart attack in 1967, when he was in Algeria.

== Sources ==
- THOMAS, Hugh, Historia de la Guerra Civil Española. Círculo de Lectores, Barcelona, 1976. ISBN 84-226-0874-X.
- Salas Larrazábal, Ramón (2006). Historia del Ejército Popular de la República. Madrid: La Esfera de los Libros. 84-9734-465-0.
- Perea Capulino, Juan (2007). Los culpables. Barcelona: Flor del Viento. 84-96495-16-7.
- El Punt Avui Un general proper a la CNT dirigint l'exèrcit de l'est
- Rutas con historia
- Sbhac: Coronel Juan Perea Capulino
