= 150th Brigade =

150th Brigade may refer to:

== British India ==
- 150th Indian Infantry Brigade

== Germany ==
- Panzer Brigade 150

== Spain ==
- CL International Brigade
- 150th Mixed Brigade

== Ukraine ==
- 150th Mechanized Brigade

== United Kingdom ==
- 150th (York and Durham) Brigade
- 150th Infantry Brigade (United Kingdom)

== See also ==
- 150th Division (disambiguation)
- 150th Regiment (disambiguation)
