= 214th Brigade =

214th Brigade may refer to:

- 214th Mixed Brigade, Spain
- 214th Brigade (United Kingdom)
- 214th Infantry Brigade (United Kingdom)
- 214th Fires Brigade, United States Army field artillery brigade

== See also ==
- 214th Division (disambiguation)
- 214th Regiment (disambiguation)
