= 147th Mixed Brigade =

- 147.ª Brigada Mixta
- Active: May 1937 – March 1939
- Country: Spanish Republic
- Allegiance: Republican faction
- Branch: Spanish Republican Army
- Size: Brigade
- Engagements: Spanish Civil War

The 147th Mixed Brigade was a unit of the Spanish Republican Army that participated in the Spanish Civil War, deployed on the Andalusia front.

== History ==
The unit was created on May 1, 1937, from troops from the old Maroto Column and recruits from the reserves. The first commander of the 147th MB was Francisco Maroto del Ojo, former commander of the Maroto column. Subsequently, the unit was assigned to the 23rd Division. For most of the war, the brigade did not intervene in relevant military operations. On March 20, 1938, it intervened in a small attack that sought to regain lost positions near Higuera de Calatrava, although the attempt failed. A few months later, on November 19, one of its battalions stormed a nationalist position. The 147th MB disappeared with the end of the war, in March 1939.

== Command ==
Commanders

- Francisco Maroto del Ojo;
- Mariano Elipe Rabadán;
- José Zarco Martínez;

Commissars

- Antonio Vázquez Vázquez

== See also ==
- Maroto Column
- Mixed Brigades

== Bibliography ==
- Alpert, Michael (1989). El ejército republicano en la guerra civil (in Spanish). Siglo XXI Editores.
- Álvarez, Santiago (1989). Los comisarios políticos en el Ejército Popular de la República (in Spanish). Ediciós do Castro.
- Engel, Carlos (2005). Historia de las Brigadas Mixtas del Ejército Popular de la República (in Spanish). Madrid: Almena. ISBN 84-922644-7-0.
- Ramírez Navarro, Antonio (2018). Aunque nos espere el dolor y la muerte. Historia del movimiento libertario en Almería (in Spanish). Editorial Universitaria de Almería.
- Sody de Rivas, Angel (2009). Antonio Rosado y el anarcosindicalismo andaluz. Morón de la Frontera (1868-1978) (in Spanish). Ediciones Carena. ISBN 978-84-88944-80-1.
