= 183rd Mixed Brigade =

- 183.ª Brigada Mixta
- Active: February 1937 – October 1937
- Country: Spanish Republic
- Allegiance: Republican faction
- Branch: Spanish Republican Army
- Type: Infantry
- Size: Brigade
- Engagements: Spanish Civil War: Biscay Campaign; Asturias Offensive

The 183rd Mixed Brigade - originally created as the 3rd Asturian Brigade - was one of the mixed brigades created by the Spanish Republican Army for the defense of the Second Spanish Republic.

== History ==
The unit was created at the beginning of February 1937 in Grullos, from the CNT nº3 battalion, being assigned to the 1st Asturian Division. The command of the Brigade fell to Víctor Álvarez González, who received military advice from Pedro Martínez Coll.

On April 27, the brigade set out with the 213th, 216th and 230th battalions to the Vizcaya front, now under the command of the Joaquín Burgos Riestra. Upon its arrival in Vizcaya, it was added to the 2nd Basque Division, placing two of its battalions in Amorebieta and another in Miravalles. During the fighting of the Battle of Bilbao, on June 13 the unit was practically destroyed in the vicinity of the so-called "Belt of Death" —the last of the defensive lines that protected Bilbao. Its remains, however, managed to withdraw and later return to Asturias.

On August 6, the unit renamed the "183rd Mixed Brigade", within the 57th Division of the 16th Army Corps, giving command of it to José Penido Iglesias. After the start of the Asturias Offensive the 183rd MB was sent to Colombres, with the mission of defending the coastal highway, being added to Division "A" (provisional). On September 5, the Republicans lost control of Llanes, so the brigade was withdrawn from the front, towards Mieres, to join Division "C". Penido Iglesias was dismissed and replaced by Ángel López Bonachela.

Towards October 5, the unit was covering the front of the mountain passes, on the heights of "El Pedrusco", "El Castillo", "Altocena" and "Busdrugo", but an advance of the nationalist forces of Antonio Aranda led them to the Campo del Caso, causing the isolation of the republican forces; all the brigade troops were taken prisoner, and the unit disappeared.

Recreation

The numbering of the old 183rd MB was adopted by a new brigade that was created on April 30, 1938, within the 49th Division of the 20th Army Corps —which, in turn, constituted the general reserve of the Central Region Army Group (GERC). The 183rd Mixed Brigade remained at the Madrid front for the rest of the war, without intervening in any major military operation.

== Command ==
Commanders

- Víctor Álvarez González;
- Joaquín Burgos Riestra;
- José Penido Iglesias;
- Ángel López Bonachela;

== See also ==
- Mixed Brigades
- CNT nº3

== Bibliography ==
- Álvarez, Ramón (1995). Rebelión militar y revolucioń en Asturias. Un protagonista libertario (in Spanish). Trea.
- Engel, Carlos (1999). Historia de las Brigadas Mixtas del Ejército Popular de la República (in Spanish). Madrid: Almena. ISBN 84-922644-7-0.
