= Battle of the Corunna Road =

Battle of the Corunna Road may refer to:

- Second Battle of the Corunna Road, 1936-7
- Third Battle of the Corunna Road, 1937

== See also ==
- Battle of Corunna, 1809
