= 89th Mixed Brigade =

- 89.ª Brigada Mixta
- Active: March 1937 - March 1939
- Country: Spanish Republic
- Allegiance: Republican faction
- Branch: Spanish Republican Army
- Type: Infantry
- Size: Brigade
- Part of: 20th Division
- Engagements: Spanish Civil War

The 89th Mixed Brigade was one of the Mixed Brigades created by the Spanish Republican Army for the defense of the Second Spanish Republic during the Spanish Civil War. It was present on the Andalusia Front.

== History ==
At the end of March 1937, the 89th mixed brigade was formed on the Córdoba Front. It was composed of: the 1st and 2nd battalions - from the old Maroto Column - and the 3rd and 4th battalions - which came from the «Cultural Militias of Jaén» column. José Villagrán Ganzinotto was appointed as commander of the brigade, which was soon placed in the 20th Division of 9th Army Corps which had its headquarters in Andújar.

During the war, the Chiefs of Staff were the militia captains Ostalet and Manuel Marín Guerrero, while the political commissar was Alfonso Fernández Torres, from the CNT. In February 1939, José María Aguirre Lobo held command of the brigade, while the Chief of Staff was Guillermo Vázquez Rodríguez.

== See also ==
- Maroto Column
- Mixed Brigade
