= Mixed brigade =

Mixed Brigades Brigadas Mixtas
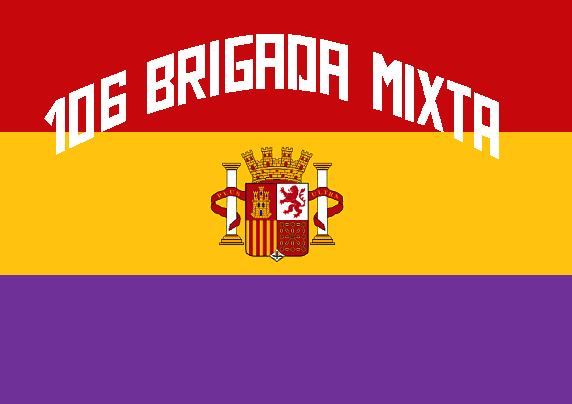
- Standard of the 106 Mixed Brigade of the Popular Army of the Spanish Republic
- Active: 1936–1939
- Country: Spanish Republic
- Branch: Spanish Republican Armed Forces
- Type: Infantry brigade
- Role: Home Defence
- Part of: Spanish Republican Army divisions
- Engagements: Spanish Civil War

Commanders
- Notable commanders: Enrique Líster; José María Galán

Mixed brigade (Spanish: brigada mixta) was a basic tactical military unit of the Republican army during the Spanish Civil War. It was initially designed as "pocket division", an innovative maneuverable combined-arms formation. Because of high saturation with specialized troops and services it would have resembled a division, but in terms of manpower it would have been much smaller and amount to some 3,700 men.

Shortages of career officers and NCOs plus inability to provide arms and equipment needed rendered the original mixed brigade pattern unworkable. The Republican general staff kept redrafting the scheme with decreasing proportion of non-infantry sub-units, though even these arrangements proved impossible to implement. Most of the 188 mixed brigades raised during the war were closer to the infantry regiment blueprint.

Assumptions about the nature of the warfare which gave rise to the mixed brigade concept were largely correct. However, the Republic could not have afforded such highly-specialized and well-equipped units. Attempts to implement the scheme put extra strain on the Republican recruitment and logistics system; as a result, the mixed brigade scheme was counterproductive and worked to the detriment of the Republican military capacity.

== Origins ==
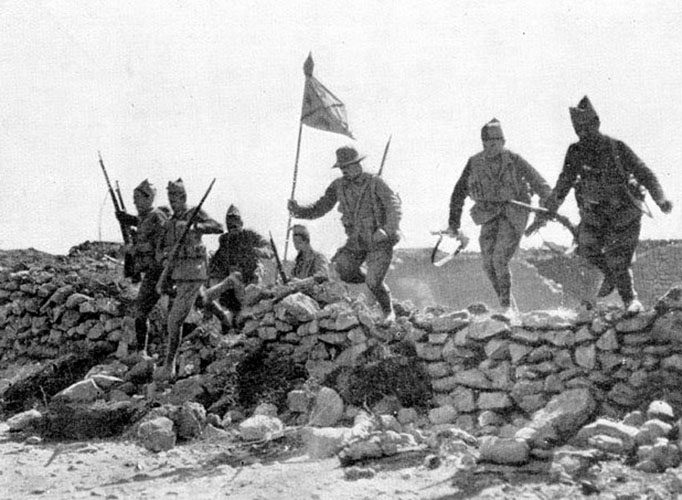
Spanish soldiers during the Rif War

Origins of the mixed brigade concept are not clear and in historiography there are various theories which point to its beginnings. One is related to debates within the Spanish general staff of the 1920s; banking on experiences of the Rif War, some officers suggested formation of relatively small, flexible combined-arms units. In the early 1930s and influenced by Swiss attempts, two Brigadas Mixtas were ordered to be formed as Spanish mountain troops. During further discussions of the mid-1930s the idea that the Spanish army should include a large number of autonomous units smaller than división organica was gradually taking root.

A somewhat competitive theory claims that the concept was merely an acknowledgement of warfare reality during first weeks of the Civil War. During July, August and September 1936 most fighting took place between improvised, relatively small, lightly armed and highly maneuverable groups, usually referred to as "columns". The Republican general staff reportedly concluded that they should turn this makeshift model into a systematic and structured scheme and units raised in this way should emphasize mobility and flexibility rather than manpower. One more theory credits Soviet military advisers, present in Spain since early October 1936, for coining the concept; one version of this theory holds that the Soviets merely encouraged the Republican general staff to implement the idea which had already been in circulation for some time.

== Underlying concept: "pocket division" ==
BM organigram

The basic assumption which triggered emergence of the mixed brigade concept was that the war in Spain would be about flexibility rather than manpower. Such a vision elicited the idea that the key army unit should be able to operate independently, without support of other specialized units typically assigned to larger military formations (e.g. unlike a typical infantry regiment, which requires support of other divisional services to achieve military objectives). This in turn produced a conclusion that the key army unit should be a highly maneuverable, combined-arms formation.

The resulting vision was "a cross between a reinforced regiment and a very small division", a "little great unit", "division en miniatura" or a "pocket division": a unit which in terms of manpower would be much smaller than a division, but which would reproduce some of divisional features by means of large proportion of specialized and support sub-units. This vision was eventually embodied in a scheme of a "mixed brigade"; the term "mixed" was to indicate its combined-arms composition, making it different from a typical infantry unit of comparable size. Mixed brigades were supposed to operate independently and to be grouped into a larger formation only for the purpose of waging a particular campaign or battle, but not as its permanent components.

== Theoretical composition ==
The original scheme as worked out in 1936 envisioned that a mixed brigade would be made of 3,700 soldiers. Internal composition was to be as follows:

- brigade staff
- 4 infantry battalions. Each battalion was to consist of 4 infantry companies, 1 machine-gun company and 1 platoon of mortars. In comparison the regular army division, named "división orgánica", was composed of 2 brigades, each brigade composed of 2 regiments, each regiment composed of 3 battalions
- 1 field artillery group. It was to be composed of 4 batteries of medium artillery (usually 75 mm guns) and 1 battery of heavy artillery (usually 105 mm guns). In comparison the regular army division was to consist of 1 regiment of light artillery and 1 regiment of heavy howitzers
- 1 cavalry squadron (in alternative versions replaced with motorized infantry). In comparison the regular army division was also to include 1 squadron, on wartime footing enlarged to 1 cavalry regiment
- 1 pioneer company. The regular army division was to incorporate 1 battalion of pioneers
- 1 motorized reconnaissance squadron
- 1 communication and logistics group. It was to consist of dedicated communication (including radio transmission), intendancy and supply-logistics sub-units
- other support sub-units, including a sanitary and medical detachment

In terms of manpower the mixed brigade as originally envisioned was in-between a regular army infantry regiment and a regular brigade. In terms of firepower it would have been stronger than a brigade. In most European armies of the late 1930s (which unlike the Spanish army did not feature brigades as fixed divisional units) it would have been comparable to a very strong regiment. In terms of modus operandi and because of its general autonomy a mixed brigade was somewhat resemblant of a division.

== Implementation problems ==
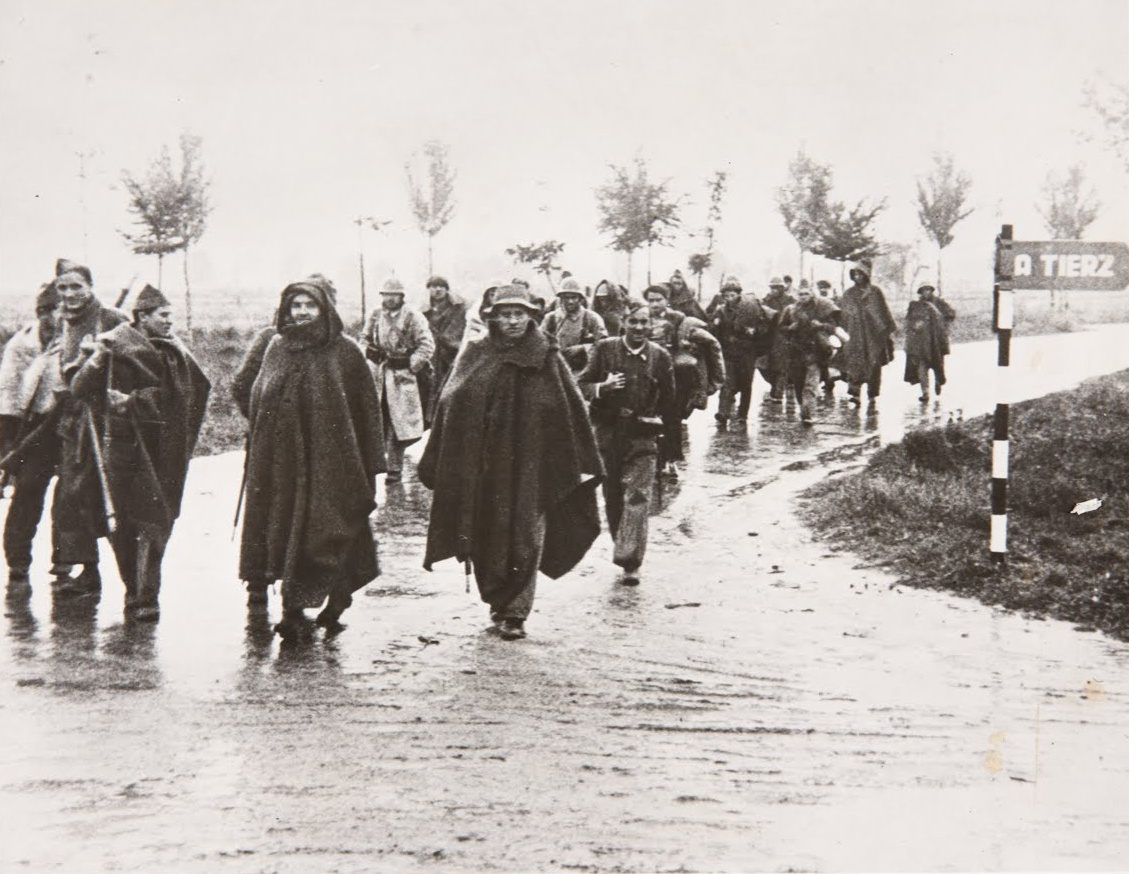
Republican infantry

Not a single unit has ever been raised in line with the original plan, all units named brigadas mixtas differed significantly and then very significantly from the scheme, and the entire original concept remained largely on paper. Initially the reason were pressing wartime necessities; the Nationalist army was approaching Madrid and half-formed units were thrown into battle before they reached the structure envisioned. Later it turned out that the Republic was unable to provide all weapons and equipment needed, and that shortage of NCOs and officers made it impossible to ensure their sufficient number even for traditional army units. Finally, in later stages of the war the increasingly dramatic military situation forced Republican high command to raise troops in non-systematic, makeshift manner.

Because of problems with raising mixed brigades in line with the original plan, the Republican general staff was continuously re-drafting their structure; the change was generally about reducing the weight of non-infantry components and enlarging infantry battalions (eventually from 633 to 828 men). The result was decreasing firepower and increasing manpower of the entire unit; final versions of the brigada mixta scheme envisioned its strength as some 4,200 people, though less than a half would serve in frontline combat sub-units. However, neither these revised plans have been implemented and brigada mixta theoretical schemes as developed in 1937-1938 remained a blueprint intended, but never fully put into practice.

== Practice ==
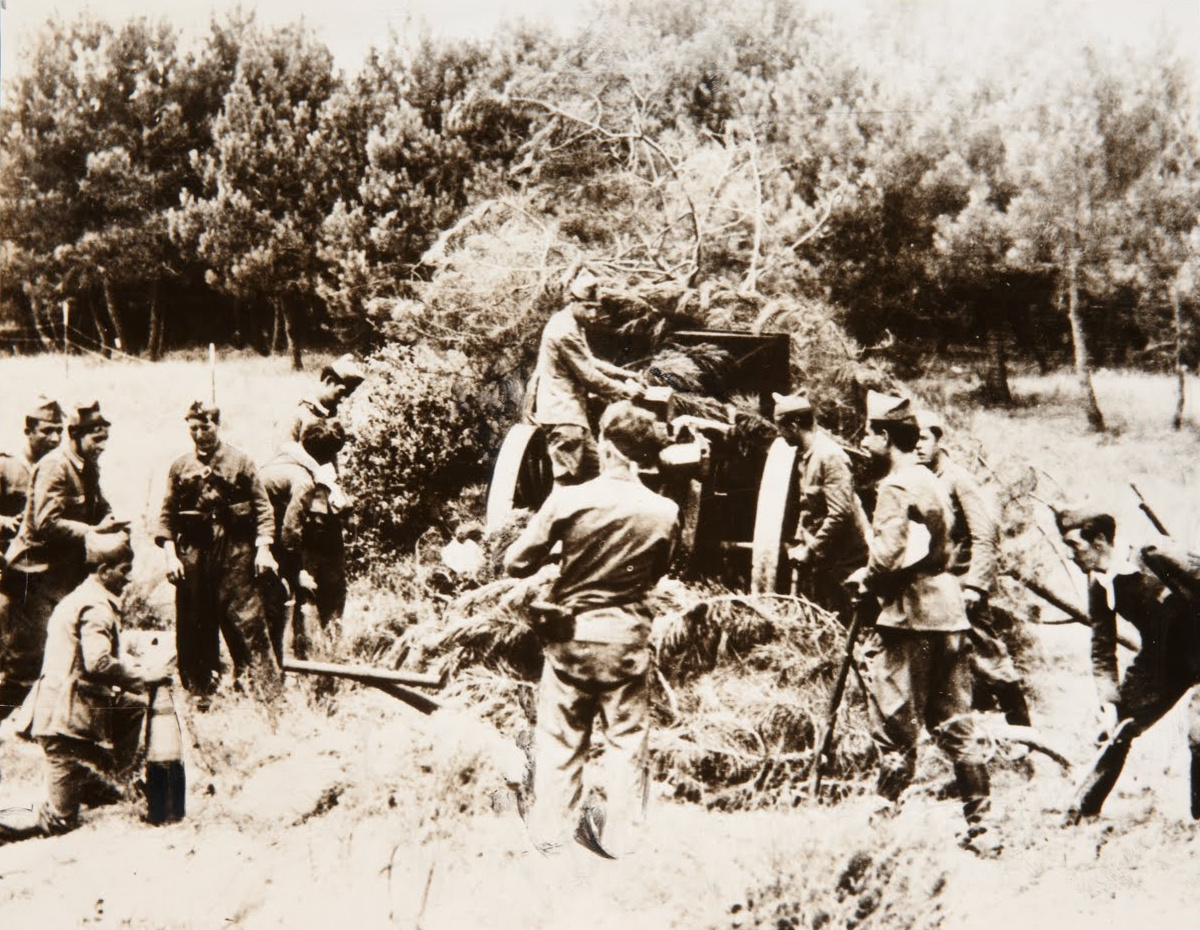
Republican artillery

The concept of mixed brigades was discussed during sittings of the Republican government in late September 1936; the first known military document which refers to raising of these units is dated 18 October 1936 and the first 6 units were created shortly. By December 1936 there were 15 brigades deployed, and by the spring of 1937 there were 40 units operational. Those formed in central Spain were numbered 1-50, those raised in the Levante and Andalusia were numbered 51-82, whose those built in the North were numbered until 189. The last brigade formed was numbered 246 and was created in December 1938, though the number of units actually raised which entered combat was around 190. Most of the build-up process was controlled by the military. Manpower was provided by distributing pre-war regiments among the brigades, by incorporating earlier militia units active on the front, and then by regular draft (though there were also volunteers).

Units raised as mixed brigades resembled rather a traditional infantry regiment. Their strength was some 3,500 men, though the number of rifles available was below 2,000; in practice an average unit counted some 1,600-1,800 rifles. In all 188 units created there were only 49 career officers acting either as commanders or chiefs of staff. Non-infantry sub-units were increasingly smaller; as general staff experts noted artillery was too dispersed, to gain critical mass guns and howitzers were shifted to divisional units. Deployment of mixed brigades differed significantly from the original plan; instead of operating as autonomous units, they were grouped by 3 into divisions and remained their fixed components. However, the concept of brigada mixta resulted in some change of divisional tactics. Though in terms of manpower (some 14,000 people) comparable to a Nationalist division, the Republican division was more loosely organized and its sub-components retained much greater autonomy.

== Evaluation ==
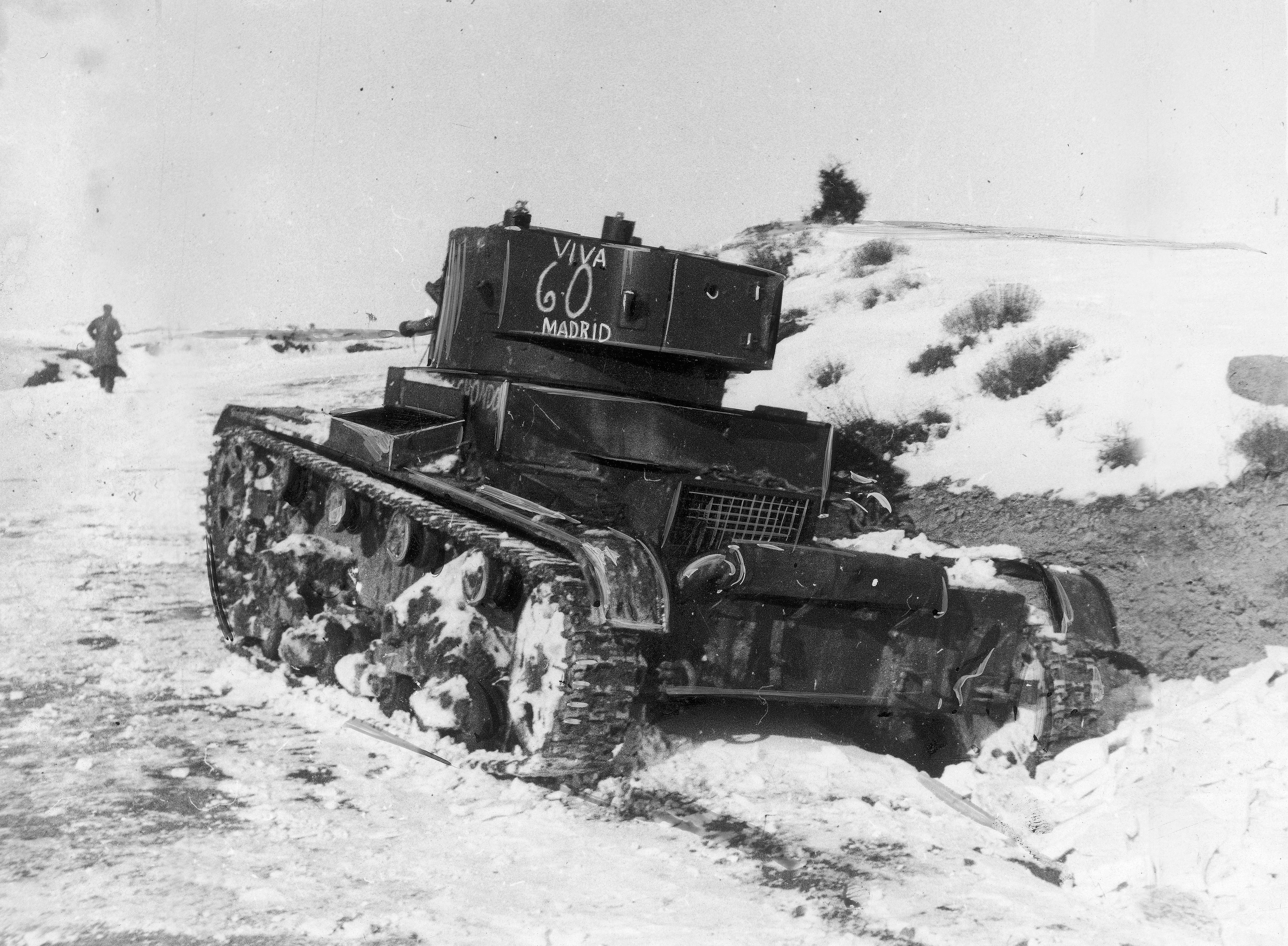
Republican armor

Scholars note that the underlying assumptions which gave rise to the mixed brigade concept were basically correct, and that the nature of warfare during the Spanish Civil War indeed favored mobility, flexibility and autonomy over structure, manpower and hierarchical organization. They also note that the innovative idea of creating combined-arms units below the divisional level was later successfully implemented during World War Two in form of the improvised German Kampfgruppen. However, they also noted that the mixed brigade scheme was one that the Republic could not have afforded, and that attempts to implement it produced more harm than good.

The key point raised is that mixed brigades required even more specialists, NCOs, and career officers than pre-war brigades; as the Republic faced dramatic shortages of skilled military men, enforcing the scheme made matters even worse. Another point is that the Republic was unable to provide sufficient equipment and arms, and as a result non-infantry sub-units remained to a large extent an under-armed and under-equipped fiction. Splitting up the artillery gravely reduced firepower. Finally, it is noted that the mixed brigade pattern was a "waste of men", as an unusually high proportion of soldiers were assigned to non-combat roles. One military historian claims that "thanks to the decision to adopt the mixed brigade as its basic unit, the People's Army was crippled as a fighting force almost from its very inception".

Favorable comments are related not that much to the mixed brigade itself, but rather to its role within larger military units. It is noted that divisions formed from mixed brigades were more flexible, and that loose organisation of such divisions allowed greater efficiency when manoeuvre and relatively open front determined the nature of military operations. However, otherwise the mixed-brigade-based organisation might have contributed to chaos.

== Mixed Brigades ==
The Mixed Brigades of the International Brigades are in Roman numerals.

=== 1st to 100th ===
Number	Establishment date	Disbandment date	Observations
1st	10 October 1936	9 February 1939	From the Fifth Regiment.
2nd	13 October 1936	February 1939	Included railroad workers.
3rd	October 1936	March 1939 (?)	Carabineros unit.
4th	November 1936	March 1939	
5th	October 1936	28 March 1939	Carabineros unit.
6th	October 1936	March 1939	
7th	27 March 1937	27 March 1939	
8th	27 March 1937	27 March 1939	Carabineros unit. Formerly "Brigada M".
9th	23 January 1937	9 February 1939	Initially known as 1st Brigada Mixta Bis.
10th	21 December 1936	9 February 1939	Initially known as 1st Brigada móvil choque.
XI	22 February 1936	February 1939	
XII	1 November 1936	9 February 1939	
XIII	1 December 1936	February 1939	Former "Columna Temple y Rebeldía".
XIV	1 December 1936	25 September 1938	
XIV Bis	27 November 1937	23 February 1938	XIV offshoot organized by Jules Dumont.
XV	31 January 1937	February 1939	Lincoln Battalion part of this brigade.
16th	December 1936	March 1939	
17th	December 1936	28 March 1939	
18th	November 1936	28 March 1939	
19th	December 8936	31 January 1939	
20th	November 1936	March 1939	
21st	December 1936	17 January 1939	
22nd	November 1936	March 1939	Former "Columna Peire".
23rd	October 1936	January 1939	
24th	December 1936	January 1939	
25th	November 1936	March 1939	
26th	October 1936	28 March 1939	
27th	December 1936	28 March 1939	
28th	October 1936	March 1939	
29th	October 1936	28 March 1939	Former "Columna Cuevas".
30th	31 December 1936	March 1939	
31st	2 January 1937	February 1939	
32nd	31 December 1936	March 1939	Former "Columna Mangada".
33rd	6 January 1937	4 February 1939	
34th	1 January 1937	27 March 1939	Former "Columna Robledo".
35th	1 January 1937	March 1939	
36th	1 January 1937	March 1939	Took part in the so-called "Usera Tunnel Scam".
37th	31 December 1936	February 1939	
38th	31 December 1936	February 1939	Former "Columna Perea".
39th	26 November 1936	March 1939	Former "Columna Palacios".
40th	26 November 1936	27 March 1939	Former "Columna Ortega".
41st	26 November 1936	March 1939	
42nd	1 January 1937	March 1939	Included the Elche Battalion.
43rd	26 November 1936	27 March 1939	Former "Columna Escobar".
44th	31 December 1936	27 March 1939	
45th	31 December 1936	27 March 1939	Former "Columna Burillo".
46th	31 December 1936	March 1939	
47th	31 December 1936	March 1939	
48th	28 March 1937	March 1939	
49th	February 1937	February 1939	terminated after the bombing of Xàtiva.
50th	February 1937	March 1939	
51st	14 March 1937	March 1939	
52nd	January 1937	March 1939	
53rd	January 1937	March 1939	
54th	March 1937	March 1939	
55th	1 March 1937	March 1939	
56th	January 1937	February 1939	
57th	1 January 1937	March 1939	
58th	January 1937	March 1939	
59th	January 1937	9 February 1937	Former "Columna Rosal".
60th	January 1937	4 February 1939	Former "Columna Rosal".
61st	January 1937	March 1939	Former "Columna Rosal".
62nd	December 1936	January 1939 (?)	
63rd	December 1936	March 1939	
64th	December 1936	March 1939	
65th	December 1936	March 1939	Carabineros unit.
66th	December 1936	March 1939	
67th	February 1937	March 1939	
68th	January 1937	February 1939	
69th	December 1936	March 1939	
70th	15 January 1937	March 1939	Former "Columna España Libre".
71st	January 1937	27 March 1939	
72nd	January 1937	February 1939	Re-established after surviving the Battle of Bielsa.
73rd	March 1937	March 1939	
74th	January 1937	27 March 1939	
75th	February 1937	March 1939	
76th	April 1937	March 1939	
77th	February 1937	March 1939	
78th	February 1937	March 1939	
79th	February 1937	March 1939	
80th	February 1937	March 1939	
81st	March 1937	March 1939	Former "Columna Iberia" and "Columna Torres-Benedito".
82nd	March 1937	March 1939	Former "Columna Hierro" and "Primera Columna confederal".
83rd	March 1937	March 1939	Former "Columna Hierro".
84th	March 1937	January 1938	Former "Columna Hierro" and "Columna Temple y Rebeldía". Terminated after the "Mora de Rubielos events". Re-established on 19 April 1938; Took part in the Battle of the Ebro. Disappeared during the Catalonia Campaign.
85th	March 1937	March 1939	Carabineros unit.
86th	March 1937	28 March 1939	Originally Brigada móvil Puertollano in December 1936. Reorganized as International Brigade.
87th	March 1937	March 1939	Carabineros unit.
88th	March 1937	27 March 1939	Former "Columna Andalucía-Extremadura".
89th	March 1937	March 1939	
90th	May 1937	March 1939	
91st	March 1937	March 1939	Destroyed in the Battle of Mérida pocket (1938); Later re-established.
92nd	March 1937	March 1939	Originally known as 75th Brigada Mixta.
93rd	January 1937	February 1939 (?)	Originally known as 53rd Brigada Mixta.
94th	March 1937	9 February 1939	Originally established upon the former "Columna Iberia". Terminated in September 1937 after the Battle of Brunete. Reason: ineptitude during combat. Re-established with Infantería de Marina forces.
95th	June 1937	9 February 1939	Originally established with Anarchist militias. Terminated following the Battle of Brunete. Reason: ineptitude during combat. Re-established with Infantería de Marina forces.
96th	June 1937	March 1939	
97th	June 1937	March 1939 (?)	
98th	1 June 1937	March 1939	
99th	12 June 1937	March 1939	
100th	June 1937	9 February 1939	Shock troops of the 11th Division.

=== 101st to 200th ===
Number	Establishment date	Disbandment date	Observations
101st	May 1937	9 February 1939	Shock troops of the 46th Division.
102nd	March 1937	9 February 1939	Formed from the remainders of the "72nd Mixed Brigade".
103rd	March 1937	March 1939	
104th	March 1937	February 1939	
105th	March 1937	March 1939	
106th	March 1937	March 1939	
107th	March 1937	March 1939	
108th	March 1937	March 1939	
109th	Spring 1937	March 1939	Annihilated in the Battle of Mérida pocket (1938).
110th	March 1937	March 1937	
111th	17 March 1937	27 March 1939	
112th	April 1937	28 March 1939	
113th	March 1937	27 March 1939	
114th	March 1937	26 March 1939	
115th	March 1937	March 1939	
116th	28 April 1937	March 1939	Former "Columna Sur-Ebro".
117th	28 April 1937	January 1939	Former "Columna Sur-Ebro". Fell apart in Catalonia.
118th	28 April 1937	March 1939	Former "Columna Sur-Ebro".
119th	28 April 1937	February 1939	Former "Columna Durruti".
120th	28 April 1937	January 1939	Former "Columna Durruti".
121st	28 April 1937	January 1939	Former "Columna Durruti".
122nd	28 April 1937	January 1939	Disbanded after the Battle of the Ebro.
123rd	28 April 1937	January 1939	Disbanded after the Battle of the Ebro.
124th	28 April 1937	January 1939	Disbanded after the Battle of the Ebro.
125th	28 April 1937	March 1939	Former "Columna Ascaso" and "Columna Los Aguiluchos de la FAI".
126th	28 April 1937	March 1939	Former "Columna Ascaso".
127th	28 April 1937	27 March 1939	Former "Columna Ascaso" and "Columna Roja y Negra".
128th	28 April 1937	October 1937	Disbanded and re-established more than once.
CXXIX	8 February 1938	28 March 1939	It lost its International Battalions in October 1938.
130th	28 April 1937	9 February 1939	Re-established after escaping the Bielsa pocket.
131st	28 April 1937	9 February 1939	
132nd	11 June 1937	28 March 1939	Former "Columna Macià-Companys".
133rd	May 1937	January 1939	
134th	May 1937	26 January 1939	
135th	May 1937	February 1939	
136th	1 May 1937	February 1939	
137th	1 May 1937	February 1939	
138th	1 May 1937	March 1939	
139th	1 May 1937	February 1939	
140th	1 May 1937	February 1939	
141st	May 1937	February 1939	
142nd	May 1937	12 February 1939	
143rd	May 1937	16 January 1939	Annihilated in Gaià
144th	May 1937	January 1939	
145th	May 1937	January 1939	
146th	May 1937	23 January 1939	
147th	1 May 1937	March 1939	Former "Columna Maroto".
148th	9 May 1937	March 1939	
149th	May 1937	February 1939	
150th	11 June 1937	March 1939	
CL	27 May 1937	4 August 1937	Disbanded after the debacle at Brunete.
151st	June 1937	January 1939	Formed with Infantería de Marina troops.
152nd	June 1937	March 1939	Carabineros unit.
153rd	June 1937	26 January 1939	Former "Columna Terra i Llibertat".
154th	January 1938	March 1939	Former 1st Basque Brigade; re-established as guerrilla unit.
155th	January 1938	March 1939	Former 2nd Basque Brigade; re-established as guerrilla unit.
156th	January 1938	March 1939	Former 3rd Basque Brigade; re-established as guerrilla unit.
157th	January 1938	March 1939	Former 4th Basque Brigade; re-established as guerrilla unit.
158th	January 1938	March 1939	Former 5th Basque Brigade; re-established as guerrilla unit.
159th	January 1938	March 1939	Former 6th Basque Brigade; re-established as guerrilla unit.
160th	January 1938	March 1939	Former 7th Basque Brigade; re-established as guerrilla unit.
161st	January 1938	March 1939	Former 8th Basque Brigade; re-established as guerrilla unit.
162nd	January 1938	March 1939	Former 9th Basque Brigade; re-established as guerrilla unit.
163rd	January 1938	March 1939	Former 13th Basque Brigade; re-established as guerrilla unit.
164th	January 1938	March 1939	Former 11th Basque Brigade; re-established as guerrilla unit.
165th	January 1938	March 1939	Former 12th Basque Brigade; re-established as guerrilla unit.
166th	6 August 1937	October 1937	Former 1st Santander Brigade.
167th	6 August 1937	21 August 1937	Former 2nd Santander Brigade.
168th	6 August 1937	21 August 1937	Former 3rd Santander Brigade.
169th	6 August 1937	September 1937	Former 8th Santander Brigade.
170th	6 August 1937	21 August 1937	Former 4th Santander Brigade.
171st	6 August 1937	21 August 1937	Former 5th Santander Brigade.
172nd	6 August 1937	21 August 1937	Former 6th Santander Brigade.
173rd	6 August 1937	25 August 1937	Former 7th Santander Brigade.
174th	30 April 1938	January 1939 (?)	Former 9th Santander Brigade.
175th	30 April 1938	March 1939	Former 10th Santander Brigade.
176th	30 April 1938	February 1939	Former 11th Santander Brigade.
177th	30 April 1938	January 1939 (?)	Former 12th Santander Brigade.
177th	30 April 1938	2 January 1939 (?)	Former 14th Santander Brigade.
179th	19 April 1938	February 1939	Carabineros unit.
180th	30 April 1938	March 1939	Former 16th Asturian Brigade.
181st	30 April 1938	March 1939	
182nd	30 April 1938	March 1939	Fate unknown
183rd	30 April 1938	March 1939	Former 3rd Asturian Brigade.
184th	6 August 1937	21 October 1937	Former 10th Asturian Brigade.
185th	6 August 1937	September 1937	Former 15th Asturian Brigade.
186th	6 August 1937	October 1937	Former 13th Asturian Brigade.
187th	6 August 1937	October 1937	Former 14th Asturian Brigade.
188th	6 August 1937	October 1937	Former 17th Asturian Brigade.
189th	30 April 1938	March 1939	Former 1st Asturian Brigade.
190th	30 April 1938	March 1939	Former 2nd Asturian Brigade.
191st	30 April 1938	March 1939	Formed from remainders of the 4th Basque Brigade and the 8th Santander Brigade.
192nd	30 April 1938	March 1939	Former 5th Asturian Brigade.
193rd	30 April 1938	March 1939	Former 6th Asturian Brigade.
194th	22 May 1938	March 1939	Former 4th Asturian Brigade.
195th	22 May 1938	March 1939	Former 7th Asturian Brigade.
196th	22 May 1938	January 1939	Fell apart in Catalonia.
197th	22 May 1938	March 1939	
198th	30 April 1938	January 1939	Fell apart in Catalonia along with the 196th and 199th
199th	30 April 1938	January 1939	Fell apart in Catalonia along with the 196th and 198th
200th	May 1938	28 March 1939	Ordered to retreat from the front in January 1939.

=== 201st to 246th ===
Number	Establishment date	Disbandment date	Observations
201st	30 April 1938	28 March 1939	
202nd	30 April 1938	29 March 1939	
203rd	May 1938	March 1939	
204th	30 April 1938	March 1939	
205th	May 1938	March 1939	
206th	May 1938	March 1939	
207th	May 1938	March 1939	
208th	April 1938	March 1939	
209th	August 1937	March 1939	
210th	August 1937	March 1939	
211th	August 1937	March 1939	Carabineros unit.
212th	28 August 1937	March 1939	
213th	24 August 1937	January 1939 (?)	
214th	24 August 1937	March 1939	
215th	24 August 1937	March 1939	
216th	24 August 1937	March 1939	
217th	24 August 1937	March 1939	
218th	24 August 1937	March 1939	
219th	24 August 1937	26 March 1939	
220th	24 August 1937	26 March 1939	
221st	24 August 1937	March 1939	Fate unknown
222nd	Summer 1937	March 1939	Carabineros unit. Fate unknown
223rd	Summer 1937	March 1939	Engaged in coastal defence.
224th	Summer 1937	January 1939 (?)	Restructured in spring 1938.
225th	Summer 1937	March 1939	Coastal defence
226th	Summer 1937	9 February 1939	part of the 42nd Division
227th	22 April 1938	9 February 1939	
228th	December 1938	January 1939	Carabineros unit.
229th	December 1938	January 1939 (?)	
230th	February 1938	Data lacking	Guerrilla unit.
231st	February 1938	Data lacking	Guerrilla unit.
232nd	February 1938	Data lacking	Guerrilla unit.
233rd	February 1938	Data lacking	Guerrilla unit.
234th	February 1938	Data lacking	Guerrilla unit.
235th	February 1938	Data lacking	Guerrilla unit.
236th	February 1938	Data lacking	Guerrilla unit.
237th	February 1938	Data lacking	Guerrilla unit.
238th	February 1938	Data lacking	Guerrilla unit.
239th	February 1938	Data lacking	Guerrilla unit.
240th	February 1938	Data lacking	Guerrilla unit.
241st	December 1938	Unknown	Did not see combat action before disbandment.
242nd	December 1938	February 1939	
243rd	December 1938	Unknown	Did not see combat action before disbandment.
244th	December 1938	Unknown	Did not see combat action before disbandment.
245th	December 1938	February 1939	
246th	January 1939	Unknown	Could not be fully established before the Eastern Region Army Group fell apart.

== See also ==
- Spanish Republican Armed Forces
- Fifth Regiment
- Military organization
- International Brigades
- Si me quieres escribir
- Brigade combat team: Modern military unit based on the concept of a combined-arms brigade formation

== Bibliography ==
- Alpert, Michael (2013); The Republican Army in the Spanish Civil War, 1936-1939, Cambridge University Press. ISBN 978-1107028739
- Carlos Engel Masoliver (1999). Historia de las Brigadas Mixtas del Ejército Popular de la República. Madrid: Almena. ISBN 978-8-492-26447-6.
- Helen Graham (2003). The Spanish Republic at War 1936-1939. Cambridge University Press. ISBN 978-0521459327.
- Salas Larrazábal, Ramón (2006); Historia del Ejército Popular de la República. La Esfera de los Libros S.L. ISBN 84-9734-465-0
