= 20th Division (Spain) =

- Active: April 3, 1937–1939
- Country: Spain
- Allegiance: (Second Spanish Republic) Republican faction
- Branch: Spanish Republican Army
- Type: Infantry
- Size: Division
- Garrison/HQ: Andújar
- Engagements: Spanish Civil War

The 20th Division was one of the divisions of the People's Army of the Republic that were organized during the Spanish Civil War on the basis of the Mixed Brigades. Situated on the Andalusian front, the division played a minor role.

== History ==
The unit was created on April 3, 1937, within the Southern Army.

It was made up of the 52nd (in Hinojosa del Duque), 89th (Torredonjimeno) and 92nd (Andújar) mixed brigades. The 20th Division, which had its headquarters in Andújar, came under the command of Carlos García Vallejo. Subsequently, command of the unit fell to Urbano Orad de la Torre.

As of June 1937, the division was incorporated into the newly created IX Army Corps.

Throughout the war it did not take part in relevant military operations.

== Command ==
Commanders

- Carlos García Vallejo;
- Urbano Orad de la Torre;

Commissars

- Andrés Cuchillo Rodríguez, of the PSOE;

Chiefs of Staff

- Miguel González Rubio;

== Organization ==
Date	Attached Army Corps	Integrated Mixed Brigades	Battle front
April 1937	-	52nd, 89th, 92nd	Andalusia
April 1938	IX Army Corps	89th, 106th, 148th	Andalusia

== Bibliography ==
- Alpert, Michael (1989). El ejército republicano en la guerra civil (in Spanish). Siglo XXI Editores.
- Álvarez, Santiago (1989). Los comisarios políticos en el Ejército Popular de la República (in Spanish). Ediciós do Castro.
- Álvarez Rey, Leandro; Lemus López, Encarnación (1998). Historia de Andalucía Contemporánea (in Spanish). Universidad de Huelva.
- Engel, Carlos (1999). Historia de las Brigadas Mixtas del Ejército Popular de la República (in Spanish). Madrid: Almena. ISBN 84-922644-7-0.
- Moreno Gómez, Francisco (1985). "La Guerra civil en Córdoba (1936-1939)" (in Spanish). Córdoba: Alpuerto.
- Martínez Bande, José Manuel (1981). La batalla de Pozoblanco y el cierre de la bolsa de Mérida (in Spanish). Madrid: Editorial San Martín.
- Zaragoza, Cristóbal (1983). Ejército Popular y Militares de la República, 1936-1939 (in Spanish). Barcelona: Ed. Planeta.
