= 39th Mixed Brigade =

- 39.ª Brigada Mixta
- Active: November 1936 – March 1939
- Country: Spanish Republic
- Allegiance: Republican faction
- Branch: Spanish Republican Army
- Type: Infantry
- Size: Brigade
- Engagements: Spanish Civil War: Siege of Madrid; Battle of Guadalajara; Levante Offensive

The 39th Mixed Brigade was a unit of the Spanish Republican Army that took part in the Spanish Civil War. Throughout the war the brigade was present on the Madrid, Guadalajara and Levante fronts.

== History ==
The unit was created on November 26, 1936, at the Madrid front, from the "Ferrer", "Toledo", "Sigüenza", "7th Confederate Militias", "Orobón Fernández" and "Juvenil Libertario" battalions of the Palacios Column. (Note: The denomination of battalions was more nominal than real, since the sum of all of them gave 1,719 troops.) Miguel Palacios Martínez was appointed as commander of the 39th Mixed Brigade, with the anarcho-syndicalist Julián Adrados Almazán as political commissar.

On December 31, the brigade was assigned to the 5th Division. At that time the unit covered the northwestern sector of the Casa de Campo, on the right wing of the Madrid front — following the Madrid railway line - to the road from Húmera to Aravaca. The 39th MB received reinforcements from the Durruti Column, the brigade being yielded by the "Juvenil Libertario" and "Orobón Femández" battalions. Later, troops from the "El Socialista" and "Casa del Pueblo" battalions, and the 8th and 14th confederal battalions, were incorporated, greatly diminished in numbers. During the following months the unit remained at the Madrid front, without taking part in relevant military actions. In April 1937, it took part in the attacks against the nationalist positions on the Madrid front, suffering significant casualties, having to be relieved of the front line on April 19. During the rest of 1937, Mariano Román Urquiri and Álvaro Gil del Moral passed through command of the brigade.

On March 31, 1938, the brigade was sent to the Guadalajara front, where it took part in battles around the positions of Cerro Blanco and Cerro Rojo, suffering 500 casualties. After the end of these operations, José Penido Iglesias assumed command of the unit.

On April 24, the 39th MB was sent as reinforcements to the Segorbe sector, then marching to the front line in the vicinity of Allepuz, where it joined the 14th Division of the 21st Army Corps. On April 27, it failed in its attempt to retake Jorcas, although it was able to resist in the vicinity of Allepuz until May 15, being relieved of the front on the May 24. The brigade was transferred to Mora de Rubielos, where it was added again to 5th Division; the militia major Penido assumed command of the division, being replaced as commander of the brigade by Ciriaco Gil Gil. In this new sector the 39th MB assumed the mission of reestablishing defensive lines, until the end of the fighting around July 26. On November 21, command of the brigade passed to Florentino Fernández Campillo.

The unit dissolved itself coinciding with the end of the war, in March 1939.

== Command ==
Commanders

- Miguel Palacios Martínez;
- Mariano Román Urquiri;
- Álvaro Gil del Moral;
- Julio Rodríguez Fernández;
- José Penido Iglesias;
- Ciriaco Gil Gil

Commissars

- Julián Adrados Almazán

Chiefs of Staff

- Nicolás Wolpiasky;
- Joaquín Gisbert Alonso;
- Rafael Martín Gago;

== See also ==
- Mixed Brigades
- Palacios Column

== Bibliography ==
- Álvarez, Santiago (1989). Los comisarios políticos en el Ejército Popular de la República (in Spanish). Ediciós do Castro.
- Engel, Carlos (1999). Historia de las Brigadas Mixtas del Ejército Popular de la República (in Spanish). Madrid: Almena. ISBN 84-922644-7-0.
- Martínez Bande, José Manuel (1981). La batalla de Pozoblanco y el cierre de la bolsa de Mérida (in Spanish). Madrid: Editorial San Martín.
- Téllez, Antonio (1992). Sabaté. Guerrilla urbana en España (1945-1960) (in Spanish). Barcelona: Editorial Virus.
- Zaragoza, Cristóbal (1983). Ejército Popular y Militares de la República, 1936-1939 (in Spanish). Barcelona: Ed. Planeta.
