= 223rd Brigade =

223rd Brigade may refer to:

- 223rd Mixed Brigade (Spain)
- 223rd Brigade (United Kingdom)
- 223rd Brigade, Royal Field Artillery, United Kingdom

== See also ==
- 223rd Regiment (disambiguation)
- 223rd (disambiguation)
