= Bombing of Xàtiva =

- Part of the Spanish Civil War
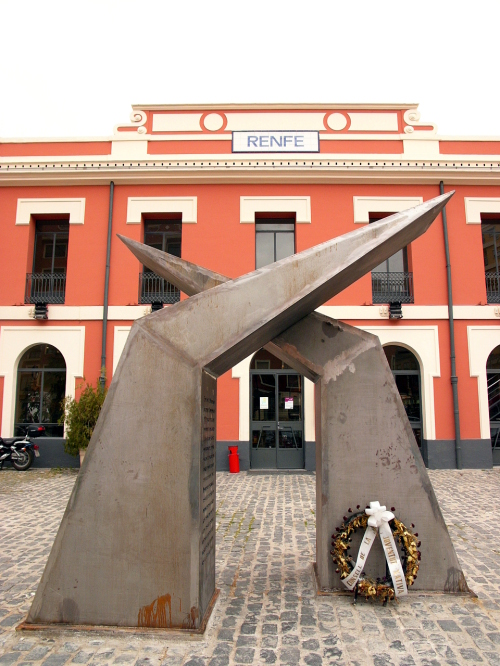
- Memorial to the dead at Xàtiva Railway Station. Named "Aixopluc", it was inaugurated on 18 February 2007.
Date	12 February 1939
Location	Xàtiva, Valencia, Spain
Result	Destruction of the 49th Mixed Brigade

Belligerents
Nationalist Spain; Kingdom of Italy	Spanish Republic

Units involved
Aviazione Legionaria	49th Mixed Brigade

Strength
Five Savoia-Marchetti SM.79	1 Mixed Brigade

Casualties and losses
None	129 killed 200+ injured

The bombing of Xàtiva was an aerial bombing of the railway station of Xàtiva, Valencia Province, during the last phase of the Spanish Civil War. It was carried out on 12 February 1939 at the behest of Francisco Franco's nationalist government by the Aviazione Legionaria of its Fascist Italian allies.

== History ==
Carried out in the last days of the Civil War, the bombing hit a train which had entered Xàtiva Railway Station in the morning. 129 people died, of whom 109 perished instantly, and over 200 were wounded.

The train was carrying military personnel of the Spanish Republican Army belonging to the 49th Mixed Brigade, which was being transferred to another location. At the time of the bombing the train was surrounded by a throng of civilians who hoped to greet relatives and friends among the soldiers. Most of those who perished were members of the 49th Mixed Brigade.

The bombing was carried out around 10:30 am by five Savoia-Marchetti SM.79 bombers of the Aviazione Legionaria based in Palma de Mallorca. They dropped twenty 250 kg (550 lb) bombs from a height of 4,200 m (13,800 ft) over the railway station. Although the fatalities were mostly soldiers, some of the victims were civilians, including three children and 14 women. There were so many dead and wounded among the members of the 49th Mixed Brigade, that the Republican high command desisted from reconstituting it, distributing the survivors among other military units.

== See also ==
- Aviazione Legionaria
