= 246th Mixed Brigade =

Spanish mixed brigade

246th Mixed Brigade 246.ª Brigada Mixta
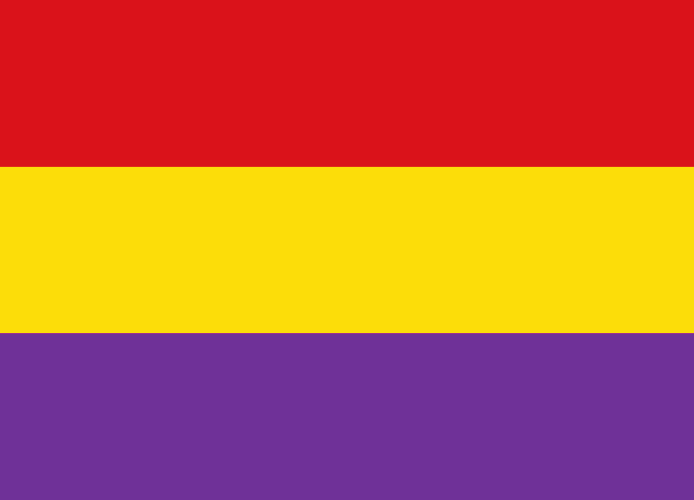
- Military flag of the Popular Army
- Active: January 1939–February 1939
- Country: Spain
- Branch: Spanish Republican Army
- Type: Mixed Brigade
- Role: Home Defence
- Size: Four battalions (projected): The 981, 982, 983 and 984
- Part of: Eastern Region Army Group (GERO); Not assigned to a division
- Garrison/HQ: Calella
- Engagements: Spanish Civil War

Commanders
- Notable commanders: Unknown

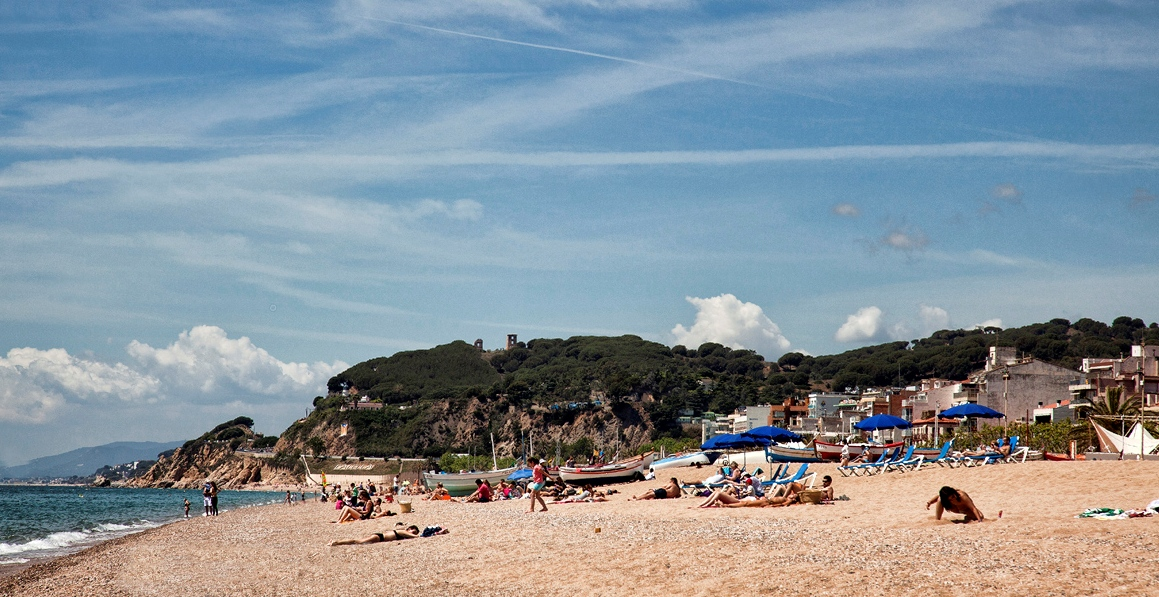
View of Calella where the 246th MB was in the process of being established.

The 246th Mixed Brigade (Spanish: 246.ª Brigada Mixta), was a mixed brigade of the Spanish Republican Army in the Spanish Civil War.

Projected in the winter in Catalonia shortly before the end of the war, it was not assigned to any division and it would be the last mixed brigade to be formed.

== History ==
The decision to establish the 246th Mixed Brigade was taken in January 1939 amidst the chaos of the rebel faction's devastating Catalonia Offensive and the massive retreat of the Spanish Republican military and civilian columns towards the French border. As far as information is available, the brigade was in the process of being structured in Calella —also known as Calella de la Costa— a shoreline town in the Maresme north of Barcelona, but the names of the commanding officers in charge of the instruction of the recruits are unknown.

In the face of the swift and steady advance of the Francoist armies in the heart of Catalonia, the constitution of this eleventh-hour brigade was next to impossible. It is not known whether it became operational and it thus probably existed only on paper.

== See also ==
- 77th Division
- Catalonia Offensive
- Mixed Brigades
