= José Penido Iglesias =

Galician anarcho-syndicalist

José Penido Iglesias (born 1894 or 1895) was a Galician anarcho-syndicalist and military commander during the Spanish Civil War.

== Biography ==
Born in Santiago de Compostela, in 1894 or 1895, in his youth he studied medicine. He emigrated to America, where he lived for some time and became involved in trade unionism. Upon his return to Spain, he joined the Republican Left party, later joining the National Confederation of Labor (CNT).

In July 1936, after the outbreak of the Spanish Civil War, he escaped to Gijón. He took command of an anarchist battalion composed mainly of Galicians, known as the Galicia battalion. In August 1937, he received the command of the 183rd Mixed Brigade, fighting during the Asturias Offensive. After the fall of the Northern Front, he returned to the central Republican area, where he held command of the 39th Mixed Brigade and of the 5th Division, with which he intervened in the Levante Offensive.

Captured by the Francoists, he was sent to a concentration camp. He spent some time in jail, leaving prison in 1943.

During the immediate postwar years he was one of those responsible for the reconstruction of the anarcho-syndicalist movement in the north, forming part of the clandestine Regional Committee of the CNT of Asturias, León and Palencia – constituted in 1942. Some time later he was elected foreign delegate of the CNT of the interior, moving to France and settling in Toulouse. This would avoid him being arrested during an important police raid against the CNT, which occurred in 1947.

In France he continued to defend the theses of the CNT's possibilist tendency, wrote for the newspapers Acción (1946) and Exilio (Aynes, 1946) and participated in the plenary held in Toulouse in December 1947 in which he defended the motion on relations with the socialist UGT. The following year he described himself as an "anarcho-monarchist", a supporter of the restoration, and with Miguel Vazquez y Chamorro he formed a regional committee of Galicia which published the newspaper Solidaridad in Toulouse from 1948 to 1950.

He later emigrated to Venezuela where in 1956 he presided over the Galician Center and in the early sixties was a member of the management of the Galician Brotherhood of Venezuela. He returned to Spain in 1964 and settled in Madrid in 1966.

== Bibliography ==
- Alexander, Robert J. (1999). The Anarchists in the Spanish Civil War. Vol. I. Janus Publishing Company Lim. ISBN 978-1-85756-412-9.
- Álvarez, Ramón (1995). Rebelión militar y revolucioń en Asturias. Un protagonista libertario (in Spanish). Trea.
- Engel, Carlos (1999). Historia de las Brigadas Mixtas del Ejército Popular de la República (in Spanish). Madrid: Almena. 84-922644-7-0.
- Herrerín López, Ángel (2004). La CNT durante el franquismo: clandestinidad y exilio (1939-1975) (in Spanish). Siglo XXI de España. ISBN 9788432311529.
- Martínez Bande, José Manuel (1977). La ofensiva sobre Valencia (in Spanish). Madrid: Editorial San Martín.
- Vega García, Rubén; Serrano Ortega, Begoña (1998). Clandestinidad, represión y lucha política: el movimiento obrero en Gijón bajo el franquismo (1937-1962) (in Spanish). Ayuntamiento de Gijón.
