= 59th Division (Spain) =

- 59.ª División
- Active: February–October 1937
- Country: Asturias
- Allegiance: (Second Spanish Republic) Republican faction
- Branch: Spanish Republican Army
- Type: Infantry
- Size: Division
- Engagements: Spanish Civil War: Asturias Offensive

Commanders
- Notable commanders: Carlos Abad López; Víctor Álvarez González

The 59th Division - originally called the 1st Asturian Division - was one of the divisions of the Spanish Republican Army that were organized during the Spanish Civil War on the basis of the Mixed Brigades.

== History ==
The division was originally created in February 1937, as the 1st Asturian Division. It was incorporated into the III Asturian Army Corps. On August 6, the unit was restructured into the 189th, 190th and 191st mixed brigades and renamed the "59th Division". It became attached to the XVII Army Corps.

It did not intervene in the Battle of Santander, so it was practically intact at the beginning of the Asturias Offensive. By then the 59th Division covered the front that ran from the sea to the mountains, in the Oviedo sector. During the Asturias campaign it did not have a relevant role, remaining in its positions without intervening in relevant military operations. At the end of October 1937 it managed to retire to Gijón, where it dissolved itself.

== Command ==
- Carlos Abad López (from February 1937);
- Eduardo Carón Alcázar (from March 1937);
- Víctor Álvarez González (from May 1937);
- Ramón Garshaball López (from August 1937);

== Bibliography ==
- Engel, Carlos (1999). Historia de las Brigadas Mixtas del Ejército Popular de la República (in Spanish). Madrid: Almena. ISBN 84-922644-7-0.
- Martínez Bande, José Manuel (1972). El final del frente norte (in Spanish). Madrid: Ed. San Martín.
- Zaragoza, Cristóbal (1983). Ejército Popular y Militares de la República, 1936-1939 (in Spanish). Barcelona: Ed. Planeta.
