= 17th Mixed Brigade =

- 17.ª Brigada Mixta
- Active: 1936–1939
- Country: Spain
- Allegiance: (Second Spanish Republic) Republican faction
- Branch: Spanish Republican Army
- Type: Infantry
- Role: Home Defence
- Size: Mixed brigade
- Engagements: Spanish Civil War: Battle of Madrid; Battle of Jarama

Map of Spain in November 1938. In pink, the two regions under Republican control.

The 17th Mixed Brigade (Spanish: 17.ª Brigada Mixta) was a unit of the Spanish Republican Army that took part in the Spanish Civil War. It was deployed in central Spain for the majority of the conflict.

== History ==
The unit was created at the end of 1936 in Villarrobledo with Lieutenant Colonel of Infantry Germán Madroñero López as its commander and Manuel Simarro Quiles of the PSOE as its political commissar. In mid-January 1937, the 17th Mixed Brigade was sent to the front lines, being deployed in the municipality of Ocaña to participate in a planned offensive on Brunete that, in the end, never took place.

On 7 February, it was added to the Burillo group and, in the middle of the Battle of Jarama, was assigned to the defense of the Puente de Titulcia bridge; shortly thereafter, it was assigned to the Chorda group and was entrusted with the defense of the Puente de Pindoque bridge. The Francoist forces took and secured the bridge. Consequently, the 17th Mixed Brigade was tasked with relieving the 23rd Mixed Brigade in stopping the enemy advances. On 12 February, the 17th Mixed Brigade attacked the Cuesta de la Reina sector. Two days later, it had reached the Vértice Pingarrón. On 15 February, it was assigned to Division B of General Gal, taking part in the brutal fighting involved in the taking of the Pingarrón. Madroñero was replaced by Infantry Commander Hilario Cid Manzano.

At the end of the Battle of Jarama, the unit was assigned to the 13th Division in Madrid. The 17th Mixed Brigade, now in its barracks in Morata de Tajuña, remained under the command of Lieutenant Coronel Julián del Castillo Sánchez, veteran of the Cuban War of Independence. At the end of 1937, Militia Major Carlos Fabra Marín assumed command of the brigade. He was soon replaced by Militia Major Gregorio Herro del Olmo. The brigade did not take part in another major military operation for the remainder of the war.

The 17th Mixed Brigade edited a publication, Madrid.

== Leaders ==
Commanders

- Lieutenant Colonel of Infantry Germán Madroñero López;
- Infantry Commander Hilario Cid Manzano;
- Lieutenant Colonel Julián del Castillo Sánchez;
- Militia Major Carlos Fabra Marín;
- Militia Major Gregorio Herrero del Olmo;
- Militia Major Manuel López Cabanas;

Political commissars

- Manuel Simarro Quiles of PSOE;
- Ángel Maynar Cebrián of PSOE;
- Pedro Tordesillas Sanz;

== See also ==
- Mixed Brigades

== Bibliography ==
- El Ejército Republicano en la Guerra Civil. By Michael Alpert. Siglo XXI de España, Madrid: Siglo XXI de España, 1989. ISBN 978-84-323-0682-2
- Historia de las Brigadas mixtas del Ejército popular de la República, 1936–1939. By Carlos Engel Masoliver. Madrid, 1999. ISBN 84-96170-19-5.
- La batalla del Jarama. By Javier de Miguel. Madrid: Esfera de los libros, 2007.
- Historia de la Guerra Civil Española. By Hugh Thomas. Barcelona: Círculo de Lectores, 1976. ISBN 84-226-0874-X
- Historia del Ejército Popular de la República. By Ramón Salas Larrazábal. La Esfera de los Libros, S.L., 2006. ISBN 84-9734-465-0
