= 8th Mixed Brigade =

8th Mixed Brigade 8.ª Brigada Mixta
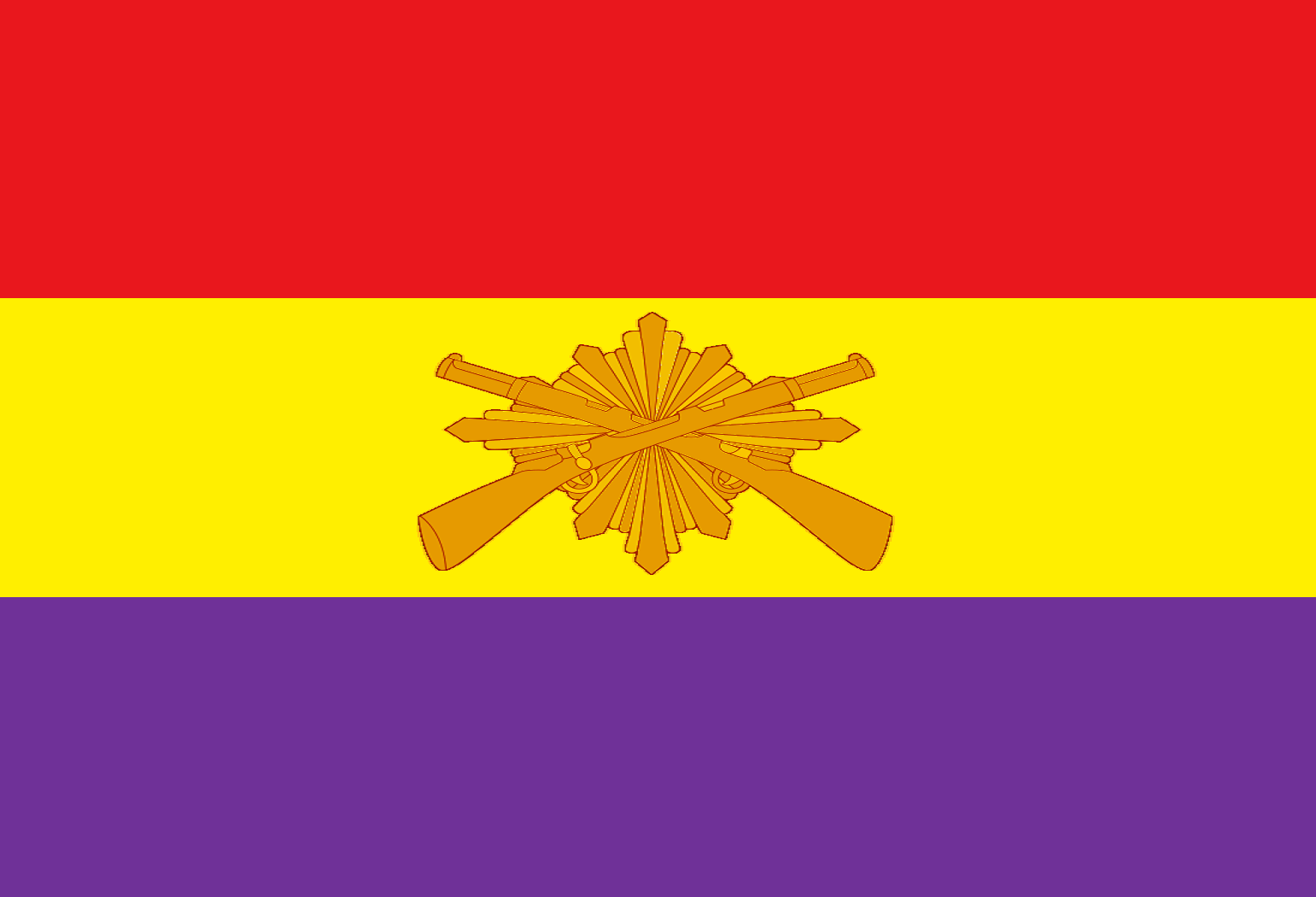
- Standard of the Carabineros Corps
- Active: March 1937– March 1939
- Country: Spain
- Branch: Spanish Republican Army
- Type: Mixed Brigade
- Role: Home Defence
- Size: Four battalions: The 29, 30, 31 and 32
- Part of: 18th Division; Central Army (1937 - 1939)
- Garrison/HQ: Madrid
- Engagements: Spanish Civil War: Siege of Madrid

Commanders
- Notable commanders: Enrique del Castillo Bravo. Emeterio Jarillo Orgaz; José Casted Sena

The 8th Mixed Brigade (Spanish: 8.ª Brigada Mixta) was a mixed brigade of the Spanish Republican Army in the Spanish Civil War. It was formed at the beginning of the Defence of Madrid in early spring 1937 with battalions of the Carabineros corps and it remained in Madrid all along the war. Its first commander was Carabineros Lt. Colonel Enrique del Castillo Bravo who was succeeded by Carabineros Commanders Emeterio Jarillo Orgaz and José Casted Sena.

This unit should not be confused with the 8th Santander Brigade or 8th Mixed Brigade of the Santander Army Corps (Cuerpo del Ejército de Santander) led by Militia Major Juan Egea Jiménez, which later became the 169th Mixed Brigade.

== History ==
A predecessor unit was established in March 1937 at the Madrid Front as "Brigada M". It was organized with the 4th, 15th and 16th Carabineros battalions. During the instruction period the unit was under the command of Carabineros Lt. Colonel Enrique del Castillo Bravo. At the onset of the Civil War del Castillo was Engineer Captain at the Nr 1 Railway Regiment (Regimiento de Ferrocarriles nº 1) at Leganés and was transferred to the Carabineros Corps. Later the command of the unit was handed over to Carabineros Commander Emeterio Jarillo Orgaz, who at the time of the coup of July 1936 was Lieutenant at the 6th Command of the corps in Alicante Province. The Chief of Staff was Major Ruiz del Toro and the Comissar Demetrio Martín Martínez.

One month after its establishment the Brigada M was renamed 8th Mixed Brigade (8.ª Brigada Mixta) and was placed under the 18th Division of the III Army Corps of the Central Army. Towards the end of 1937 Jarillo was replaced by Carabineros Commander José Casted Sena, who had been as well at the 6th Command of the Carabineros corps in Alicante, but as captain.

The unit remained in the same division and at the same sector of the Madrid Front for the remaining two years of the war. It specialized in trench warfare and remained in its post until 27 March 1939 when the Madrid defense crumbled. Militia Captain Juan Borrás Garcerán was named Chief of Staff a few days before the surrender of the Republic that marked the end of the war.

== See also ==
- Mixed Brigades
- Carabineros

== Bibliography ==
- Alpert, Michael. The Republican Army in the Spanish Civil War, 1936–1939, Cambridge University Press. 2013. ISBN 978-1107028739
- Engel, Carlos. Historia de las Brigadas Mixtas del E. P. de la República, Almena. Madrid. 1999. ISBN 84-922644-7-0
- Salas Larrazábal, Ramón. Historia del Ejército Popular de la República, La Esfera de los Libros, Madrid. 2006. ISBN 84-9734-465-0
