= 223rd Mixed Brigade (Spain) =

223rd Mixed Brigade 223.ª Brigada Mixta
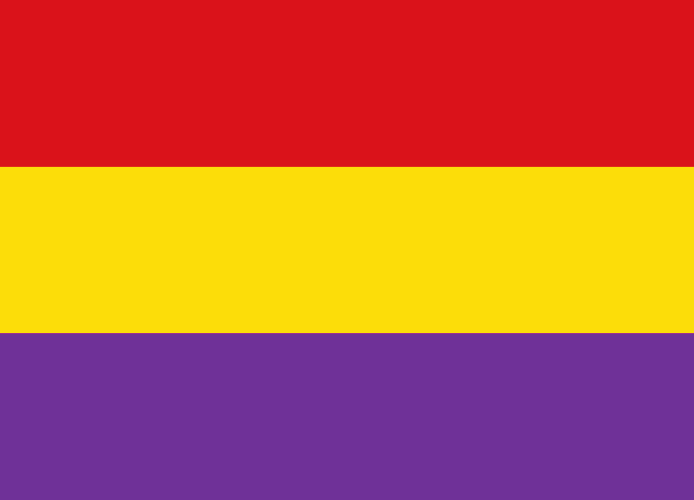
- Military flag of the Popular Army
- Active: 1937–1939
- Country: Spain
- Branch: Spanish Republican Army
- Type: Mixed Brigade
- Role: Home Defence
- Size: Four battalions: The 889, 890, 891 and 892
- Part of: Coastal Defence (1937); 64th Division (1937 - 1938); 10th Division (1938 - 1939); Coastal Defence (1939)
- Garrison/HQ: Cartagena
- Engagements: Spanish Civil War

Commanders
- Notable commanders: Ramón Garsaball López

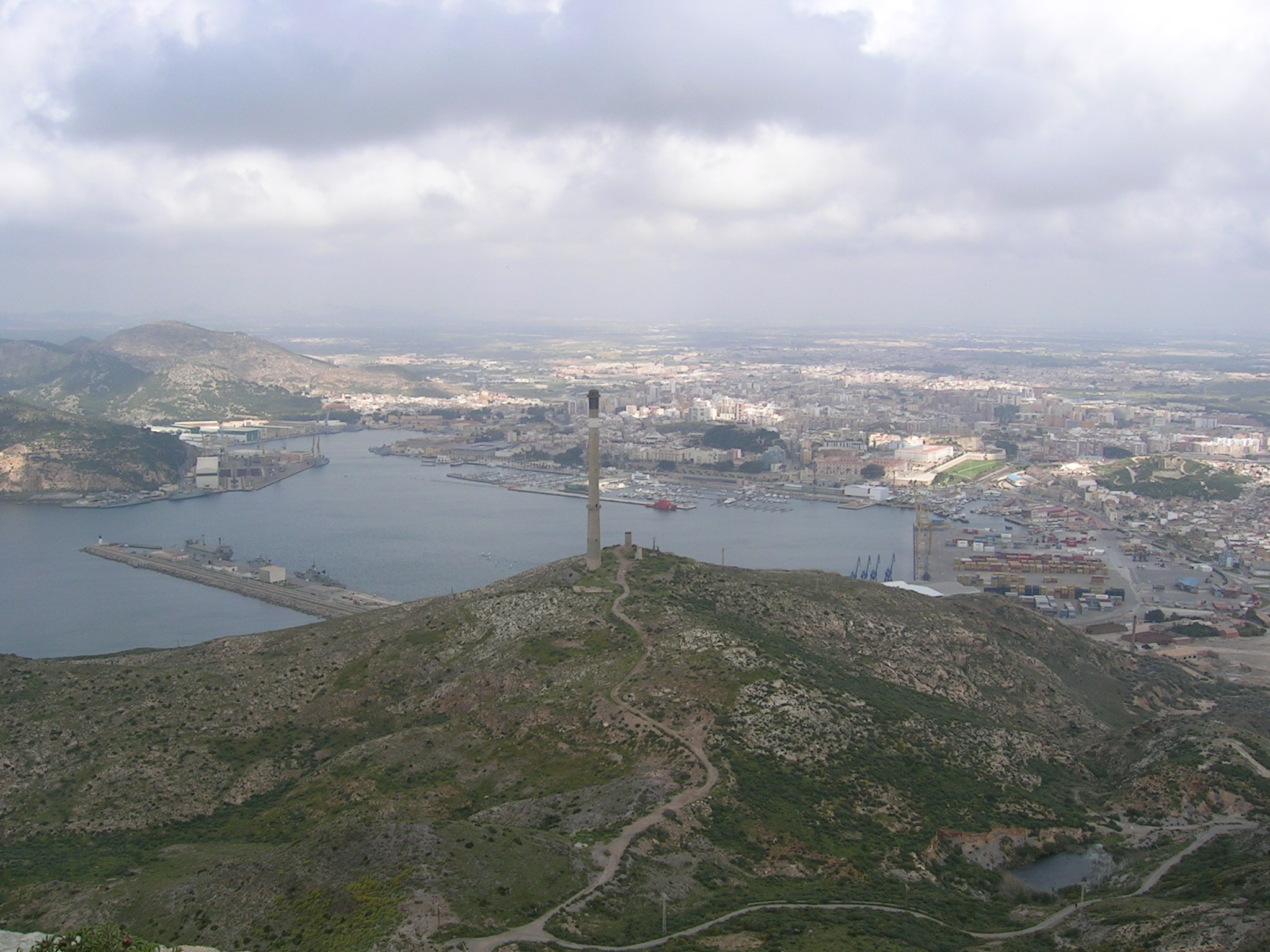
View of Cartagena where the 223rd MB was based.

The 223rd Mixed Brigade (Spanish: 223.ª Brigada Mixta), was a mixed brigade of the Spanish Republican Army in the Spanish Civil War. It was formed in the summer of 1937 from Coastal Defence units and had four battalions, the 889, 890, 891 and 892. This unit lasted until the end of the war.

== History ==
The 223rd Mixed Brigade was established in August 1937 in Cartagena with Coastal Defence (Defensa de Costas) battalions as a military reserve unit for the Andalusian Army (Ejército de Andalucía). The command of the unit was initially entrusted to the commander of the Regimiento de Infanteria Sevilla 34, an infantry unit of the Spanish Republican Army based in Cartagena, but this regiment was disbanded as a result of the reorganization of the Republican Armed Forces and its troops were integrated into newly established mixed brigades, following which the command of the 223rd Mixed Brigade went to Militia Major Ramón Garsaball López who would be its leader until only a month before the surrender of the Republican Military.

=== First phase: Cartagena and the Eastern Front ===
Although in April 1938 the 223rd Mixed Brigade was placed under the 64th Division of the XIX Army Corps of the Eastern Army (Ejército de Levante), the unit was still garrisoned in Cartagena. In July the same year the brigade was found out by the Military Investigation Service (SIM) in Cartagena to have been infiltrated by fifth column elements, following which it was sent to the Eastern Front line where there were numerous desertions among the hidden fifth-columnists that had caused the punishment of the brigade.

In the front the brigade was placed under the 10th Division of the XXI Army Corps, also belonging to the Eastern Army. The 223rd Mixed Brigade first fought in the Defensive Belt of Valencia (Cinturón Defensivo de Valencia), becoming later part of the Eastern Army reserve. Between 7 and 10 November the unit took part in the failed assault to dislodge the rebels from Nules and Castellón.

=== Extremaduran Front and end of the brigade ===
The 223rd Mixed Brigade was then transferred to the Battle of Valsequillo, where on 7 January it attacked the Cerro Mulva and the Sierra de los Santos in protracted combats that lasted about week. In February it returned to its garrison in Cartagena where it took again the Coastal Defence duty. In March 1939, during Segismundo Casado's coup against Prime Minister Juan Negrín the 223rd Mixed Brigade stood against the coup, following which its commander was deposed and Militia Major Ángel Muñoz took the command. Shortly thereafter the Republican Armed Forces surrendered and the unit was disbanded.

== See also ==
- Cartagena Uprising
- Mixed Brigades
