= Francisco Maroto del Ojo =

Spanish anarcho-syndicalist (1906–1940)

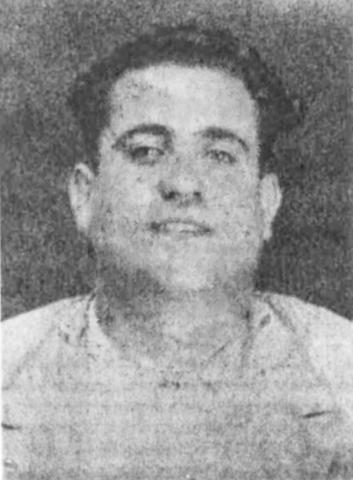
- Born: 15 March 1906; Granada, Andalusia
- Died: 12 July 1940 (aged 34); Alicante, Spain
- Military career
- Allegiance: CNT
- Service: Confederal militias (1936–1937); Spanish Republican Army (1937–1939)
- Service years: 1936–1939
- Commands: Maroto Column; 147th Mixed Brigade
- Conflicts: Spanish Civil War

Francisco Maroto del Ojo (15 March 1906, in Granada – 12 July 1940, in Alicante) was an Andalusian anarchist who was a prominent member of the National Confederation of Labor (Spanish: Confederación Nacional del Trabajo, CNT).

== Biography ==
=== Youth ===
He was born in the Granada neighborhood of Albaicín in 1906.

From an early age he dedicated himself to cabinetmaking, taking an active role as leader of the lumber union. After joining the National Confederation of Labor (CNT) he was an organizer of the CNT in the province of Granada, taking part in rallies in places like Granada, Madrid or Motril. Due to his activity he was detained on several occasions. One of his best-known arrests was due to the burning of the newspaper Ideal —which had supported the attempted coup by Sanjurjo. In 1935 he left the Granadan capital and moved to Alicante.

=== Civil War ===
At the outbreak of the Spanish Civil War in Alicante he founded the Maroto Column, initially composed of 270 anarcho-syndicalist militiamen. At the command of this column, he moved to the Granada front (Note: The column left Alicante on 6 August 1936 and arrived at Guadix, where it established its headquarters.) and came to operate in the area of Guadix. There he took charge of other anarchist militias and was able to recruit more volunteers until reaching 1,000 officers. Although he intervened in the attack against Güéjar Sierra, he was never able to take the city of Granada —the objective of his column.

Anarcho-syndicalist propaganda came to classify him as the "Andalusian Durruti".

Maroto came to openly oppose the militarization of the anarchist units deployed in Almería and Granada. At the beginning of 1937 he starred in a serious incident with the civil governor of Almería, Gabriel Morón. Finding himself in the capital of Almeria (Note: Some sources indicate that Maroto del Ojo left the front without superior authorization, while others indicate that he went to Almería commissioned by the military commander of the Guadix subsector - Colonel Arellano - to manage the acquisition of weapons.) he participated in an anarchist rally at the Cervantes theater and he gave a speech that was very critical of the authorities. (Note: He harshly criticized the Republican military for the recent Fall of Malaga, but also the civil governor Gabriel Morón for not having offered enough help to the Malagasy refugees and for having given the order to disarm the anarchist militiamen who arrived in the capital of Almería from Malaga.) Subsequently, he went to the headquarters of the civil government, accompanied by an armed guard, and had a violent confrontation with the governor in his office. After the intervention of the sailors of the battleship Jaime I, Maroto was arrested and the conflict stopped. The anarchist leader spent several months in prison and was prosecuted by the Permanent Tribunal of the Andalusian Army, which sentenced him to death; Finally, he was pardoned and released in May 1938.

In the spring of 1937 he was handed the command of the newly created 147th Mixed Brigade, a unit composed of elements from his old column. However, he only held this position for a short time.

=== Postwar and execution ===
At the end of the war he managed to move to Alicante (despite being wounded), where he remained hidden for a few months. He was arrested in January 1940, being taken into the custody of the nationalist authorities. Suffering numerous beatings —which left him semi-unconscious— he was shot on 12 July 1940 in Alicante.

== Bibliography ==
- Engel, Carlos (2005). Historia de las Brigadas Mixtas del Ejército Popular de la República (in Spanish). Madrid: Almena. ISBN 84-922644-7-0.
- Gabarda, Vicent (2007). Els afusellaments al País Valencià (1938-1956) (in Catalan). Publicaciones de la Universidad de Valencia.
- Gil Bracero, Rafael (1998). Revolucionarios sin revolución. Marxistas y anarcosindicalistas en guerra: Granada-Baza, 1936-1939 (in Spanish). Universidad de Granada.
- Quirosa-Cheyrouze, Rafael (1986). Política y guerra civil en Almería (in Spanish). Cajal.
- Ramírez Navarro, Antonio (2018). Aunque nos espere el dolor y la muerte. Historia del movimiento libertario en Almería (in Spanish). Editorial Universitaria de Almería.
- Ramos, Vicente (1972). La guerra civil (1936-1939) en la provincia de Alicante (in Spanish). Biblioteca Alicantina.
- Sody de Rivas, Ángel (2009). Antonio Rosado y el anarcosindicalismo andaluz. Morón de la Frontera (1868-1978) (in Spanish). Ediciones Carena. ISBN 978-84-88944-80-1.
- Amorós, Miguel (2011). Maroto, el héroe, una biografía del anarquismo andaluz (in Spanish). Virus editorial. ISBN 978-84-92559312.
