= 49th Mixed Brigade =

49th Mixed Brigade 49.ª Brigada Mixta
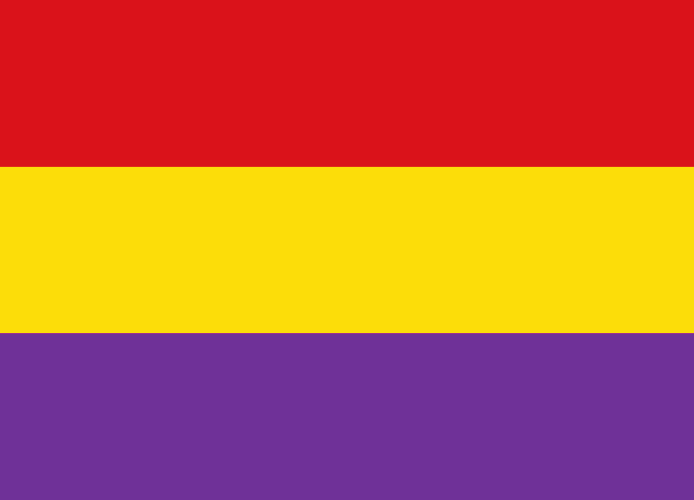
- Military flag of the Popular Army
- Active: February 1937 – 12 February 1939
- Country: Spain
- Branch: Spanish Republican Army
- Type: Mixed Brigade
- Role: Home Defence
- Size: Four battalions: The 193, 194, 195 and 196
- Part of: 12th Division (1937); A Division (1937); 47th Division (1937 - 1939)
- Garrison/HQ: Guadalajara, Spain
- Engagements: Spanish Civil War: Battle of Guadalajara; Battle of Brunete; Battle of Teruel; Battle of Alfambra; Levante Offensive; Bombing of Xàtiva

Commanders
- Notable commanders: Ángel de la Macorra Carratalá; Fulgencio González Gómez; Emeterio Rodríguez Sanabria; Amado Granell; Fernando Gil Ferragut

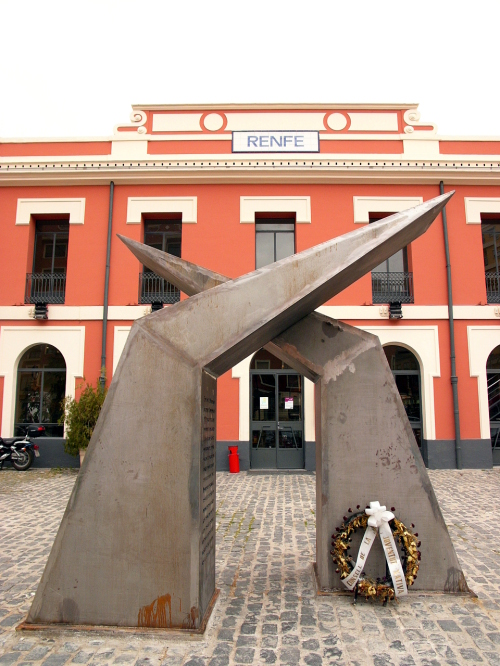
Memorial to the dead at Xàtiva Railway Station, where most of those who perished were members of the 49th Mixed Brigade.

The 49th Mixed Brigade (Spanish: 49.ª Brigada Mixta), was a mixed brigade of the Spanish Republican Army in the Spanish Civil War. It was formed in February 1937 at the Guadalajara Front.

This ill-fated military unit suffered heavy casualties over and over again during its involvement in different conflicts of the Civil War. It was finally terminated after the bombing of Xàtiva in February 1939.

== History ==
=== First phase ===
The 49th Mixed Brigade was formed in Guadalajara with four battalions, the "Pablo Iglesias Battalion", the "Triunfo Battalion" and the "Guadalajara nº 1" and "Guadalajara nº 2" Battalions, which became the 193, 194, 195 and 196 battalions respectively. The commander was Infantry Lt. Colonel Ángel de la Macorra Carratalá, a retired commander living in Madrid at the beginning of the conflict. The new unit was placed under the XII Division of the IV Army Corps of the Central Army.

On 9 March 1937 the 49th Mixed Brigade had its baptism of fire at the Guadalajara Front, where it became part of the Republican forces that fought the Fascist Italian Corpo Truppe Volontarie. Anti-Fascist Italian Major Arturo Zanoni took the command of the unit relieving de la Macorra for a brief period of time. He was then replaced by Infantry Commander Fulgencio González Gómez who had been captain at the 15th Almansa Regiment (Regimiento Almansa nº 15) in Tarragona. The commissar was Francisco Antón Sanz. After the Battle of Guadalajara the unit was sent to the Extremadura front on 14 May. Thereafter it joined the Cuenca Autonomous Group (Agrupación Autónoma de Cuenca) and went to the Huesca Front, returning to Madrid shortly after the failed offensive.

=== Battle of Brunete ===
On 8 July the 49th Mixed Brigade became part of the vanguard at the Battle of Brunete and after three days the brigade was placed under the A Division (División A) of the V Army Corps of the Central Army. Its mission was to advance from Portillera de las Rozas until the Vértice Cristo along the Majadahonda-Boadilla del Monte road until reaching the Vértice Manilla behind Romanillos. On 12 July the brigade crossed to the right flank and after two days it was made part of the Durán Division. During the night of the 24 to 25 July it relieved the 10th Mixed Brigade at the Perales River. Towards the final phase of the fight at Brunete it was placed under the V Army Corps and at the end of the battle it became part of the XLVII Division of the XVIII Army Corps.

=== Last phase and end of the unit ===
The following commander of the unit would be Militia Major Emeterio Rodríguez Sanabria. Under his command the 49th Mixed Brigade took part in the Battle of Teruel and later in the Battle of Alfambra, where its ranks were heavily depleted while trying to conquer 961 Hill (Cota 961) on 7 and 10 January. Only in the first day it suffered 213 casualties. On 3 April the unit found itself at the breaking point of the front which was submitted to vehement attacks by the forces of rebel general Antonio Aranda and it had to withdraw from the first line after being badly shattered. On 30 May the 49th Mixed Brigade was again very hard hit fighting the rebel Levante Offensive in the Ares del Maestrat-La Jana sector. Towards the beginning of July the much depleted unit was defending Castellón under the command of Infantry Major Amado Granell, but on the 15 it was definitively withdrawn for its reorganization. Following the Levante battles Militia Major Fernando Gil Ferragut became the new leader of the unit and the brigade was transferred to the less active southern front of the Levantine Army.

On 12 February 1939, when the train transporting the 49th Mixed Brigade was stopped at Xàtiva, a group of Italian Aviazione Legionaria bombers attacked the train station, leaving 129 dead and over 200 wounded. Many of the soldiers in the military train, as well as families and onlookers who were at the station to say farewell became victims of the bombing. There were so many dead among the members of the 49th Mixed Brigade, that the Republican high command desisted from reconstituting it, distributing the survivors among other military units.

== See also ==
- Mixed Brigades
- White Terror (Spain)
