= 88th Mixed Brigade =

- 88.ª Brigada Mixta
- Active: March 1937 – March 1939
- Country: Spanish Republic
- Allegiance: Republican faction
- Branch: Spanish Republican Army
- Type: Infantry
- Size: Brigade
- Engagements: Spanish Civil War

The 88th Mixed Brigade was a unit of the Spanish Republican Army created during the Spanish Civil War. During most of the war it was deployed on the Córdoba and Extremadura fronts.

== History ==
The unit was created in March 1937, based on the anarchist battalions fighting in the Córdoba offensive, as well as the former Andalusia-Extremadura Column. The command of the unit was entrusted to Juan Fernández Pérez. The 88th MB became part of the 19th Division of the 8th Corps Army and was assigned to the Peñarroya-Pueblonuevo sector, where it intervened in offensive operations between March 27 and April 13. In August, the artillery commander Francisco Blanco Pedraza took over command of the unit. A few months later, in December, Blanco handed over command of the mixed brigade to militia major Francisco Rodríguez Muñoz, and the unit was incorporated into the 38th Division, with his command post in Hinojosa del Duque.

In the spring of 1938, it participated in a small offensive in the Azuaga-Granja de Torrehermosa sector, but the attack ended in failure. A few months later, it took part in operations related to the Battle of Merida pocket. At the end of the fighting, the 88th Mixed Brigades moved to cover the defensive line of the Zújar River. (Note: At the end of 1938 it was added to the "F" column commanded by Bartolomé Fernández Sánchez.) On March 27, 1939, with the decomposition of the front and the Republican Army, the brigade dissolved itself.

In the last months of the war, the anarchist Antonio Raya was political commissar of the brigade. After the end of the war, Raya became an important leader of the Spanish Maquis in Andalusia, organizing rural and urban guerrillas that acted in the provinces of Málaga, Córdoba and Granada.

== Command ==
Commanders

- Juan Fernández Pérez;
- Francisco Blanco Pedraza;
- Francisco Rodríguez Muñoz

Commissars

- José Pérez Pareja;
- Antonio Raya

== See also ==
- Andalusia-Extremadura Column
- Mixed Brigades

== Bibliography ==
- Alpert, Michael (1989). El Ejército Republicano en la Guerra Civil (in Spanish). Madrid: Siglo XXI de España. ISBN 84-3230-682-7.
- Bermúdez, Antonio (1992). República y guerra civil: Manzanares (1931-1939) (in Spanish). Diputación Prov. de Ciudad Real.
- Engel, Carlos (1999). Historia de las Brigadas Mixtas del Ejército Popular de la República (in Spanish). Madrid: Almena. ISBN 84-922644-7-0.
- Juliá Díaz, Santos (2000). Violencia política en la España del Siglo XX (in Spanish). Taurus.
- Moreno Gómez, Francisco (1985). La Guerra civil en Córdoba (1936-1939) (in Spanish). Córdoba: Alpuerto.
- Salas Larrazábal, Ramón (2000). Historia del Ejército Popular de la República (in Spanish). La Esfera de los Libros S.L. ISBN 84-9734-465-0.
