= Víctor Álvarez González =

Asturian anarcho-syndicalist

Víctor Álvarez González (Gijón, born 1901) was an Asturian anarcho-syndicalist.

== Biography ==
A native of the Asturian city Gijón, he joined the local arm of the National Confederation of Labor (CNT).

After the outbreak of the Spanish Civil War he joined the Confederal militias, commanding a CNT battalion in Asturias. A supporter of militarization, later joined the structure of the new Spanish Republican Army, coming to command the 3rd Asturian Brigade and the 1st Asturian Division. After the fall of the Northern Front, he returned to the central-southern Republican area, where he commanded the 22nd and 25th divisions, operating on the Andalusia, Levante and Extremadura fronts.

== Bibliography ==
- Alexander, Robert J. (1999). The Anarchists in the Spanish Civil War. Vol. I. Janus Publishing Company Lim. ISBN 978-1-85756-412-9.
- Engel, Carlos (1999). Historia de las Brigadas Mixtas del Ejército Popular de la República (in Spanish). Madrid: Almena. ISBN 84-922644-7-0.
- Maldonado, José María (2007). El frente de Aragón. La Guerra Civil en Aragón (1936-1938) (in Spanish). Mira Editores.
- Zaragoza, Cristóbal (1983). Ejército Popular y Militares de la República, 1936-1939 (in Spanish). Barcelona: Ed. Planeta.
