= 2nd Mixed Brigade =

2nd Mixed Brigade Segunda Brigada Mixta
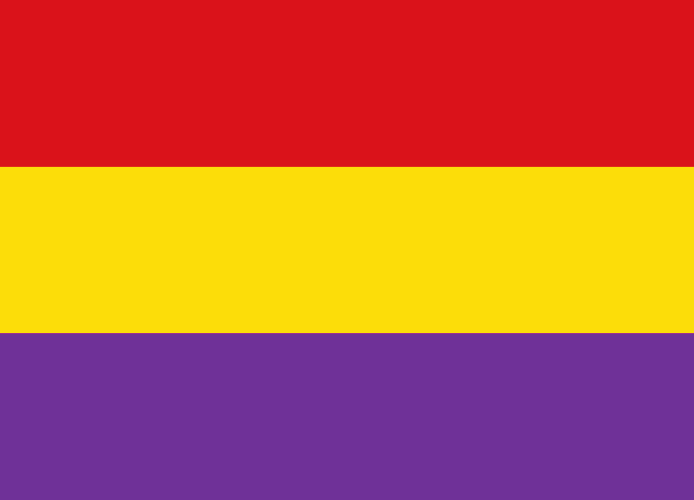
- Military flag of the Popular Army
- Active: 1936–1939
- Country: Spain
- Branch: Spanish Republican Army
- Type: Mixed Brigade
- Role: Home Defence
- Size: Four battalions: The 5th, 6th, 7th and 8th
- Part of: 7th Division (1936 - 1937); 10th Division (1937 - 1938); 64th Division (1938 - 1939)
- Garrison/HQ: Madrid
- Engagements: Spanish Civil War

Commanders
- Notable commanders: Jesús Martínez de Aragón

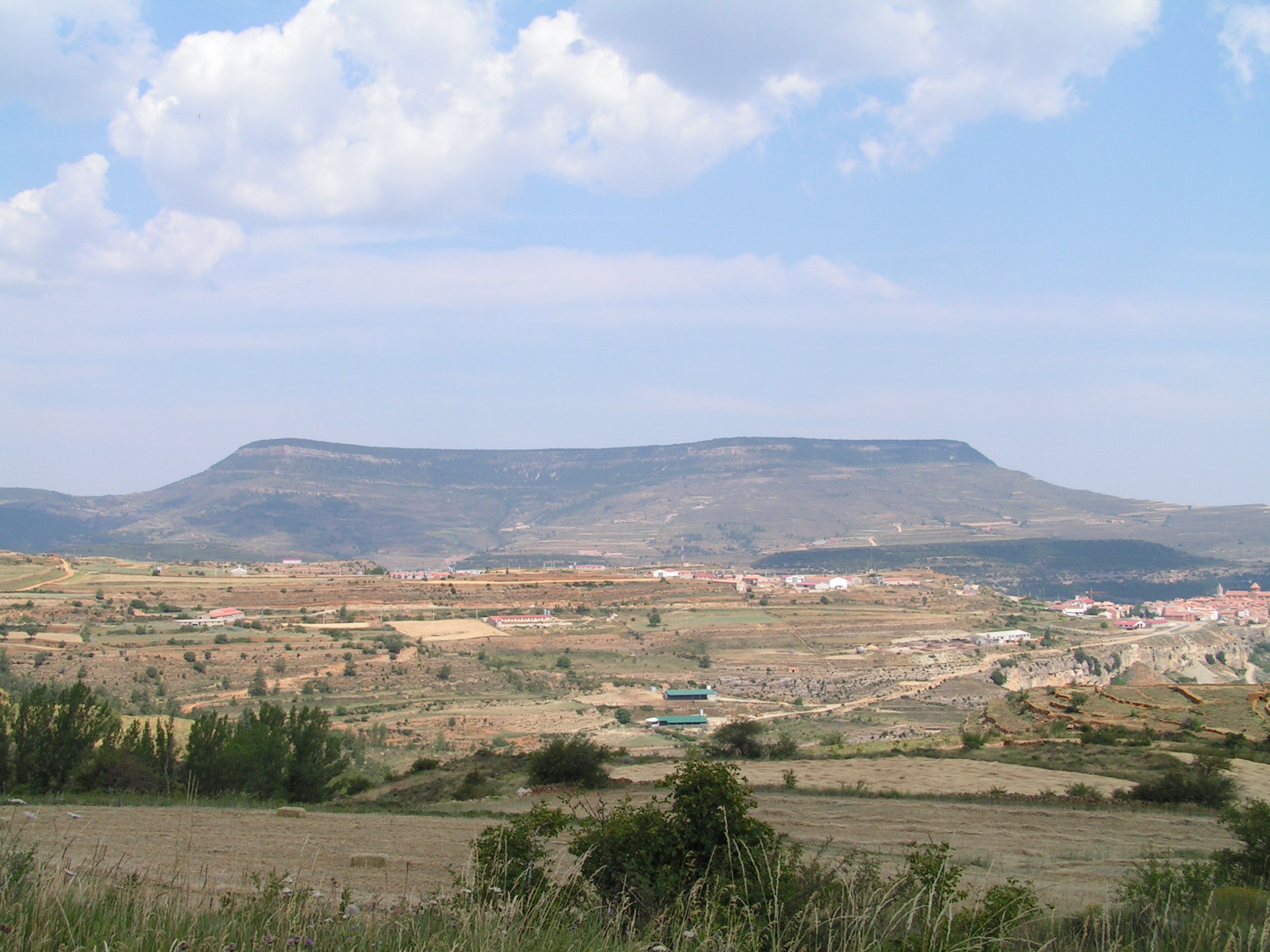
View of the Cantavieja sector, a mountainous area where the 2nd MB suffered such heavy casualties that it had to retreat in order to be rebuilt.

The Second Mixed Brigade (Spanish: 2ª Brigada Mixta), was a mixed brigade of the Spanish Republican Army in the Spanish Civil War. It was formed in October 1936 as a result of the reorganization of the Spanish Republican Armed forces.

The mouthpiece of the 2nd Mixed Brigade were the "Nuevo Horizonte" and "Victoria" newspapers.

== History ==
The Second Mixed Brigade was established on 13 October 1936 in Ciudad Real with Extremaduran militias and railroad workers as well as standard troops that had been previously garrisoned in Madrid. It was placed under the 7th Division of the II Army Corps. The command of the unit was entrusted to Major Jesús Martínez de Aragón and its commissar was Felipe Gómez Hernando.

=== Defence of Madrid ===
On 15 November the Second Mixed Brigade set out by railway towards Madrid. It arrived at Huerta in two separate groups and continued on foot until reaching the area between Ocaña and Noblejas onward to the first line of fire. On 17 November it was sent by General Miaja as a reserve unit at the front of the Ciudad Universitaria where it had to face the feared Regulares African troops. Made up of a machine-gun company and three infantry companies, the 2 mixed brigade covered repeatedly the vanguard of the sector between the southern wall of the Casa de Campo and the Puerta del Ángel. In the Ciudad Universitaria battle the 2nd mixed brigade suffered so many losses that it had to be withdrawn in March 1937 in order to be regrouped.

After the regrouping it became part of the 10th Division of the I Army Corps. From 9 to 14 April the brigade was sent to an attack against the Cerro Garabitas that did not achieve any positive result but caused multiple casualties, among them the death of its commander Jesús Martínez de Aragón. He was replaced by Militia Major José Gallego Pérez, formerly of the Military Engineering Corps, who led one of the battalions. Owing to the many losses the brigade had to be reassembled again.

The 2nd Mixed Brigade took part in the Battle of Brunete, where on 7 July it secured Villanueva del Pardillo, maneuvering between the Aulencia and Guadarrama Rivers. The following day it took part in the storming of the Villafranca Castle, after which it went to relieve troops of the 31st Division in the Villanueva de la Cañada sector. Following the scant success of the unit at the Battle of Brunete Commander José Gallego was replaced by Militia Major Ignacio Esnaola Iraola and the 2nd Brigade returned to the frontline of the Defence of Madrid in the Monte Panarra sector where it remained, almost without interruption until spring 1938.

=== Eastern Front ===
The Francoist Aragon Offensive had devastating effects on the Spanish Republican military for the rebel armies eastward thrust reached the coastal town of Vinaròs and broke the Spanish Republican territory in two. Following these events the 2nd Mixed Brigade was sent to the Eastern Front (Frente de Levante).

Its aim was to cut across the Maestrazgo ranges in order to try to hinder the progress of General Aranda's troops. By 22 April it covered the sector Vilafranca-Cantavieja-La Iglesuela del Cid, where its troops were decimated by the rebels. Following the heavy loss of lives the 2nd Mixed Brigade had suffered in the harsh mountain area, it was unfit for battle action and was sent to a defensive position in the Eastern Front until the end of the year in order to be rebuilt.

=== Extremaduran Front and end of the brigade ===
In the first half of January 1939 the somewhat rebuilt brigade was integrated in the 64th Division of the XVII Army Corps and was sent west to the Sierra Morena in the Hinojosa del Duque-Valsequillo sector of the Extremaduran front line. The unit's renewed command structure consisted of Militia Major Carlos Cornejo as commander, Infantry Captain Joaquín Segado Sánchez as Chief of Staff and Antonio Jiménez Soler, a member of the Communist Party of Spain (PCE) as commissar. Its mission was to obstruct the enemy encirclement of the loyalist troops who were trapped in the Valsequillo pocket.

Once in the combat area the 2nd Mixed Brigade attacked the rebel armies in Sierra Trapera and in Mocitas-Mataborrachas in the border area between Extremadura and NW Andalusia. In the height of the battle it was sent towards the inner area of the pocket in order to cover the withdrawal of the trapped Republican units. In these combat actions the Second Mixed Brigade had to bear so many losses that its size had to be reduced to two battalions for the second time in its history. Subsequently the brigade was gathered in Santa Eufemia, Andalusia, in order to recover and eventually to be re-established, but by then it was the last month of the war and its final fate is unknown, although it seems that it returned to the Eastern Front.

== Commanders ==
- Commanders in Chief
  - Jesús Martínez de Aragón
  - José Gallego Pérez
  - Ignacio Esnaola Iraola
  - Carlos Cornejo
- Commissars
  - Felipe Gómez Hernando
  - Antonio Jiménez Soler

== See also ==
- Mixed Brigades
