= Allepuz =

- Municipality
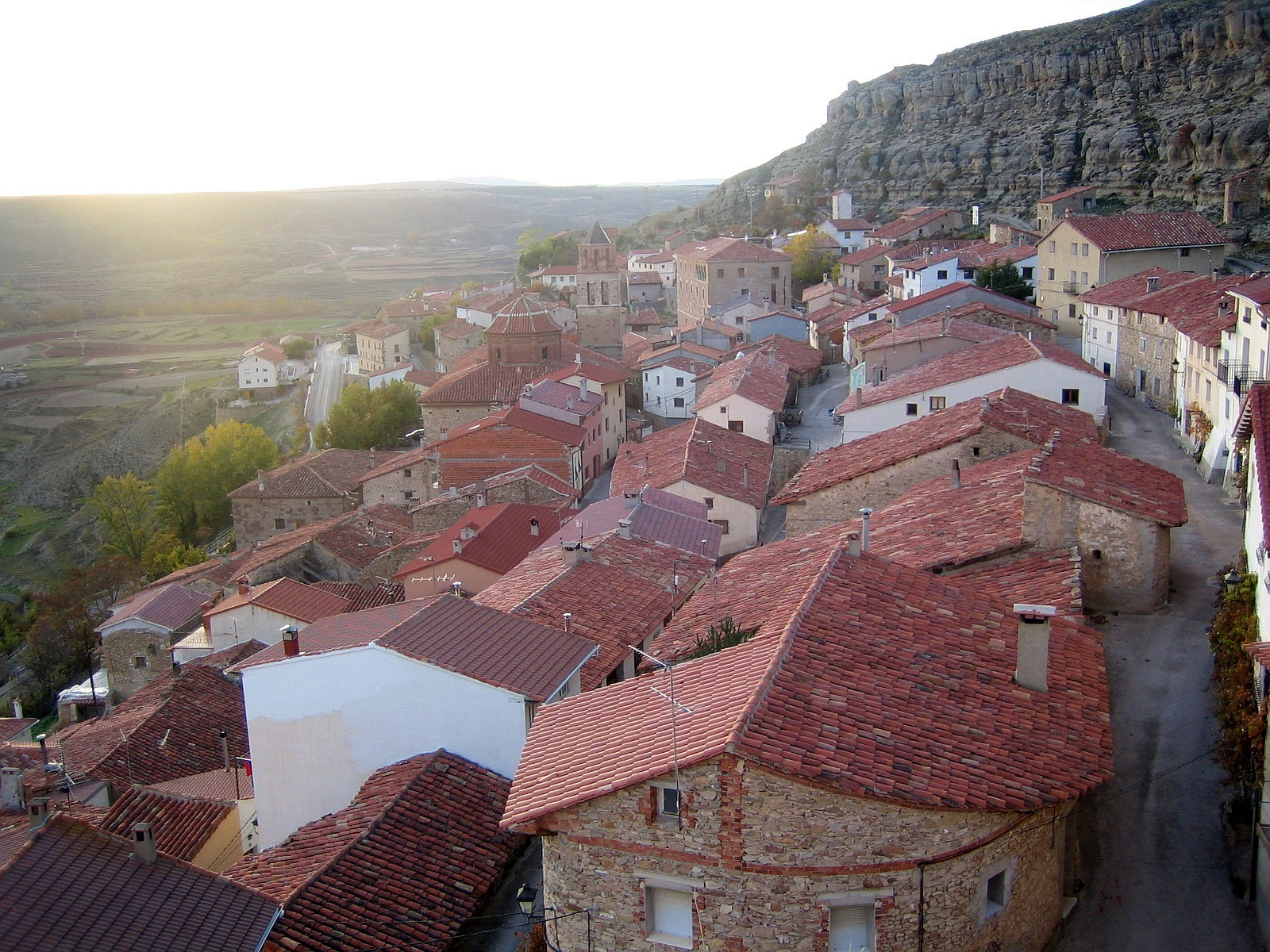

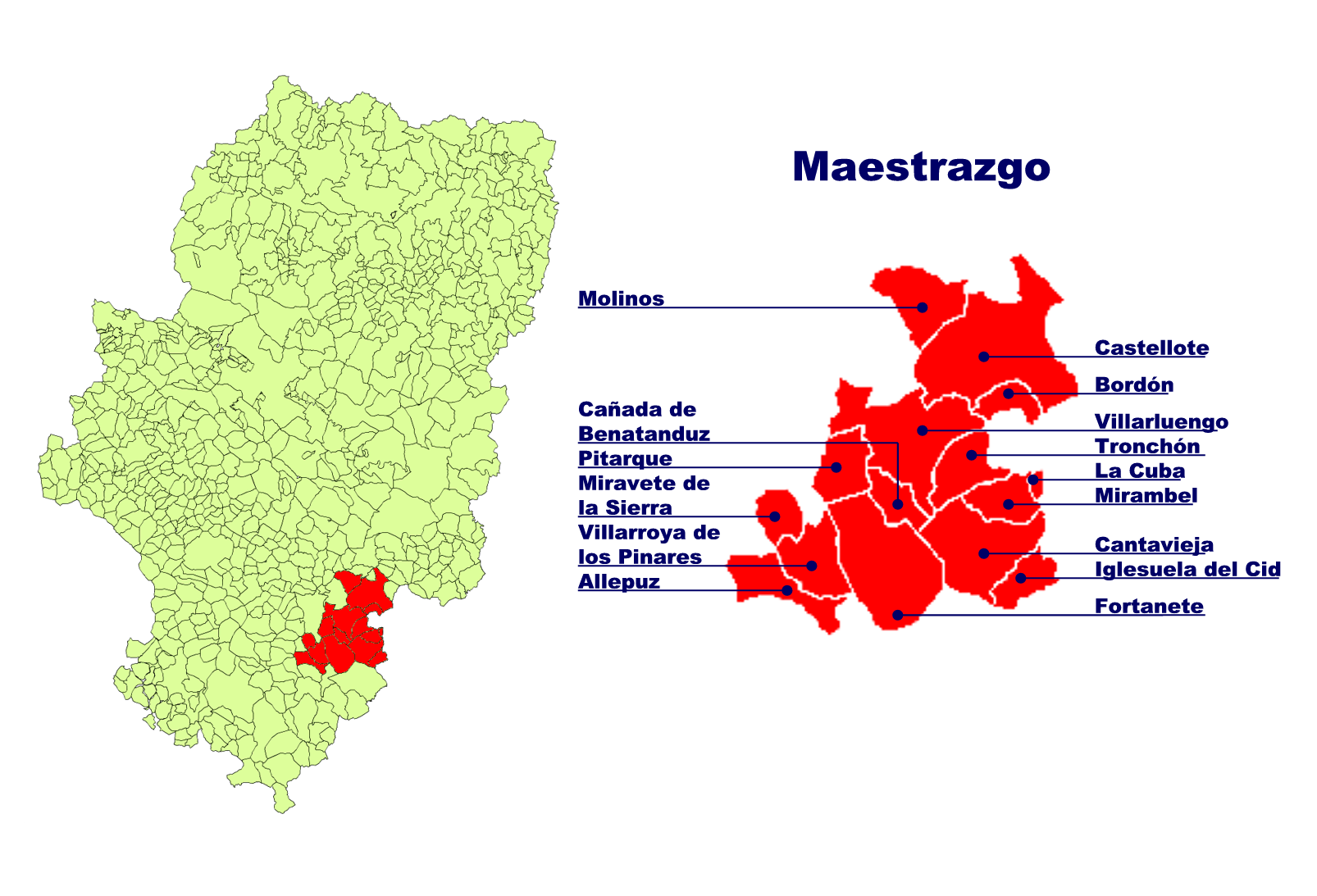

- Location in Spain Allepuz (Spain)
- Coordinates: 40°29′N 0°44′W
- Country: Spain
- Autonomous community: Aragón
- Province: Teruel
- Comarca: Maestrazgo
- Judicial district: Teruel

Government
  - Alcalde: Joaquín Manuel Villarroya Moya (2007)

Area
  - Total: 67.26 km^{2} (25.97 sq mi)
- Elevation: 1,424 m (4,672 ft)

Population (2025-01-01)
  - Total: 123
  - Density: 1.83/km^{2} (4.74/sq mi)
- Time zone: UTC+1 (CET)
  - Summer (DST): UTC+2 (CEST)
- Postal code: 44145

Allepuz is a municipality located in the province of Teruel, Aragon, Spain. According to the 2004 census (INE), the municipality has a population of 145 inhabitants.

== See also ==
- List of municipalities in Teruel
