= 150th Division (3rd Formation) (People's Republic of China) =

150th Army Division (1967–85)
- Active: 1967.11 - 1985.9
- Country: People's Republic of China
- Branch: People's Liberation Army
- Type: Division
- Role: Infantry
- Part of: 50th Army Corps
- Garrison/HQ: Jiangyou, Sichuan province
- Engagements: Sino-Vietnamese War

The 150th Army Division (Chinese: 陆军第150师)(3rd Formation) was formed in November 1967, from 1st, 5th, 10th and 12th Independent Regiments of the Independent Infantry Battalion and Independent Antiaircraft Battalion of Chengdu Military Region.

The division maintained as a Catalogue B unit from 1967 up to the period its disbandment.

In February, the division took part in the Sino-Vietnamese War. Before the war began, the division expanded from 6000 personnel (peacetime Cat B division) to 11000. At the blink of war, the division was composed of:

- 448th Infantry Regiment;
- 449th Infantry Regiment;
- 450th Infantry Regiment;
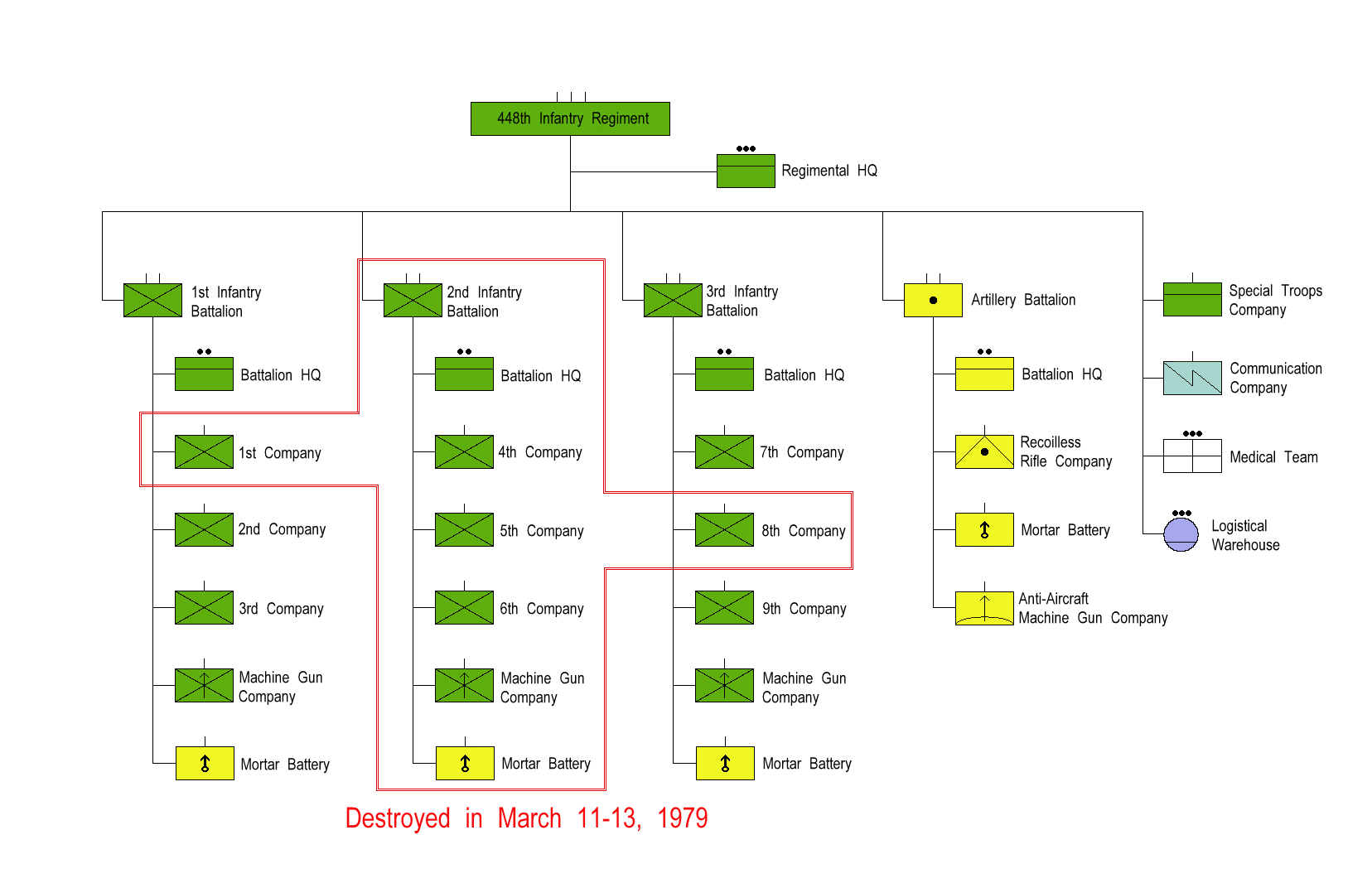
  448th Infantry Regiment of 150th Army Division, 50th Army Corps, People's Liberation Army, During the Sino-Vietnamese War, February–March 1979.Units in the red rectangle were destroyed by PAVN forces in March 11–13, 1979.
- Artillery Regiment.

The division took part in the Battle of Cao Bang.

On March 11, 1979, when retreating from Ban young region to China, the division's 448th Infantry Regiment, commanded by Li Shaowen(Chinese: 李绍文), ran into an ambush set by 851st Regiment, PAVN 346th Division. The regimental HQ soon lost contact with all its units, and the whole regiment was in panic.

By March 13, 1979, the 2nd Battalion of 448th Regiment was surrounded and overrun. To make things worse, 1st Company, 1st Battalion and 8th Company, 3rd Battalion, sent by the regimental HQ to relieve them, were also surrounded. By March 14, all surrounded PLA units were either surrendered or destroyed. The only survivor from the 2nd battalion finally reached the border of China on March 31.

During the engagement, 7 PLA companies & batteries (1st, 4th, 5th, 6th, 8th Rifle Companies, Machine-gun Company and Mortar-Artillery Battery of the 2nd Battalion) were annihilated. 448th Regiment suffered 542 "missing," soon after, it was cleared that 209 of which, were captured or surrendered; and the other of which belonged to the KIA. This engagement is considered as the biggest failure during war, by China.

The division was disbanded in September 1985, along with the Army Corps.

The division's codename was Military Unit 56018.
