= Higuera de Calatrava =

Coordinates: 37°48′N 4°10′W

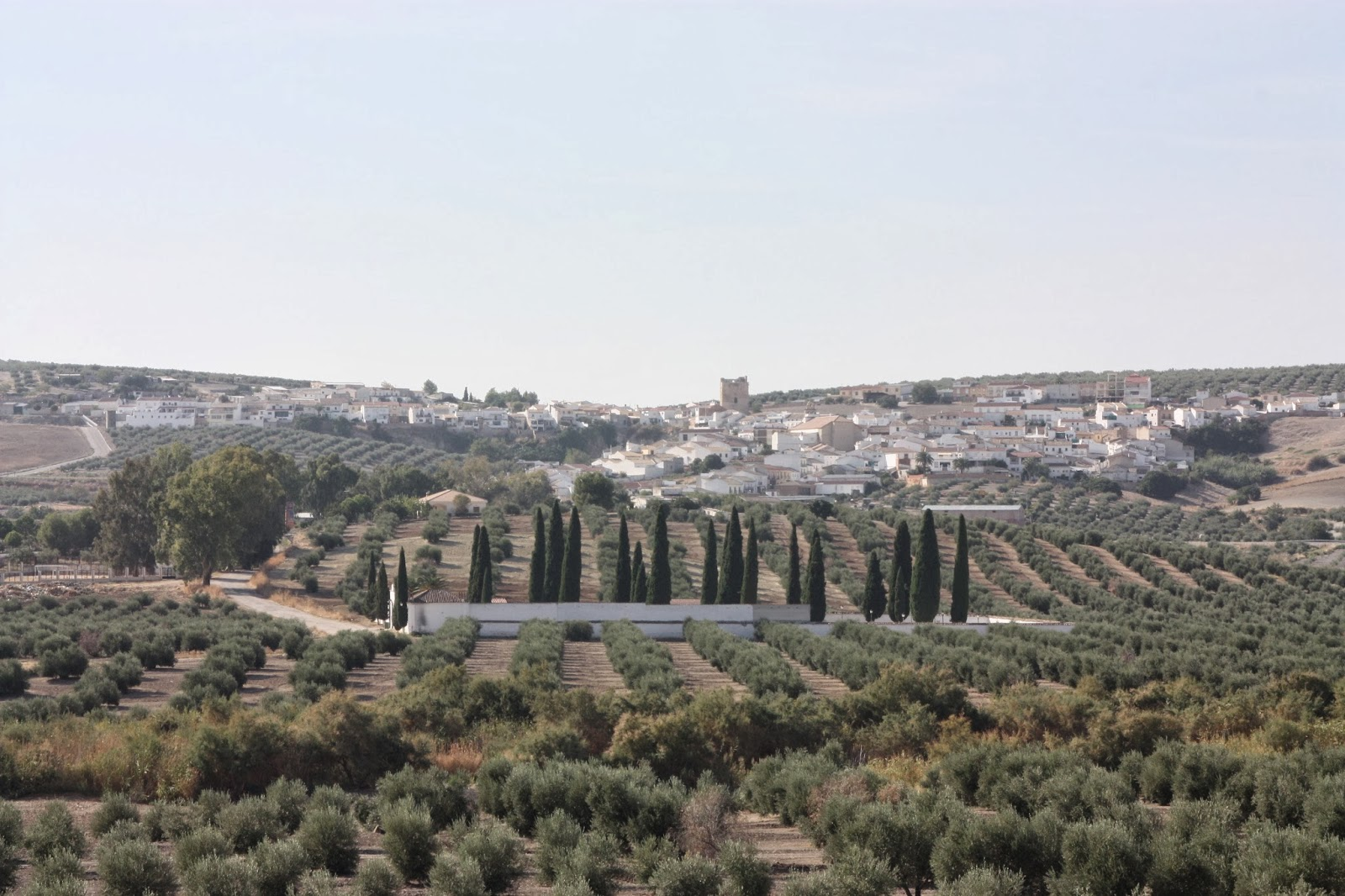
- Panoramic view of Higuera de Calatrava

- Flag Coat of arms

- Location in the Province of Jaén Higuera de Calatrava (Andalusia) Higuera de Calatrava (Spain)
- Country: Spain
- Autonomous community: Andalusia
- Province: Jaén

Area
  - Total: 39.3 km^{2} (15.2 sq mi)
- Elevation: 374 m (1,227 ft)

Population (2025-01-01)
  - Total: 590
  - Density: 15/km^{2} (39/sq mi)
- Time zone: UTC+1 (CET)
  - Summer (DST): UTC+2 (CEST)
- Website: http://www.higueradecalatrava.es/

Higuera de Calatrava is a municipality in the province of Jaén, Spain.

== See also ==
- List of municipalities in Jaén
