= XIX Army Corps (Spain) =

- XIX Cuerpo de Ejército
- Active: August 2, 1937–March 1939
- Country: Spanish Republic
- Allegiance: (Second Spanish Republic) Republican faction
- Branch: Spanish Republican Army
- Size: Corps
- Garrison/HQ: Libros
- Engagements: Spanish Civil War: Battle of Teruel; Levante Offensive

Commanders
- Notable commanders: Joaquín Vidal Munárriz

The XIX Army Corps was a military formation of the People's Army of the Republic that fought during the Spanish Civil War. Located on the Teruel Front, it took part in the Teruel and Levante campaigns.

== History ==
The unit was created on August 2, 1937, using some forces from the XIII Army Corps as a base. Both formations were assigned to the Levantine Army on August 19, 1937, (Note: In fact, the Levantine Army had been created on August 19, 1937 from the XIII and XIX Army Corps.) covering various sectors of the Teruel front. The General Staff of the XIII Army Corps was located in Torrebaja, a town in Valencian Rincón de Ademuz located south of Teruel. Its first commander was Manuel Eixea Vilar, succeeded on November 15, 1937, by Joaquín Vidal Munárriz. Meanwhile Aurelio Matilla Jimeno acted as chief of staff.

Some of its units took part in the Battle of Teruel. Later, in the spring and summer of 1938, it had a prominent participation during the Levante campaign, cooperating with the XIII, XVI, XVII, XX and XXII Army Corps to stop the Francoist offensive on Valencia. (Note: During the Levante campaign, the XIX Army Corps maintained its positions south of Teruel.) It did not intervene in relevant operations for the remainder of the conflict.

== Command ==
Commanders

- Manuel Eixea Vilar;
- Joaquín Vidal Munárriz;

Commissars

- Carlos Sanz Asensio, of the CNT;

Chiefs of Staff

- Aurelio Matilla Jimeno;
- José Guarner Vivancos;
- Ricardo Vivas García;
- Aurelio Matilla Jimeno; (Note: On January 7, 1938, he left the headquarters of the General Staff, which he returned to on February 19, 1938..)

== Organization ==
| Date | Attached Army | Built-in divisions | Battlefront |
|---|---|---|---|
| November-December 1937 | Levantine Army | 40th, 41st, 64th | Teruel |
| April 30, 1938 | Levantine Army | 40th, 64th, 66th | Levante |
| June 9, 1938 | Levantine Army | 5th, 48th, 64th | Levante |
| June 18, 1938 | Levantine Army | 5th, 64th, 201st MB | Levante |
| July 4, 1938 | Levantine Army | 64th, 66th | Levante |

== Bibliography ==
- Alpert, Michael (2013). The Republican Army in the Spanish Civil War, 1936-1939. Cambridge University Press.
- Engel, Carlos (1999). Historia de las Brigadas mixtas del Ejército Popular de la República (in Spanish). Madrid: Almena. ISBN 84-922644-7-0.
- Maldonado, José M.ª (2007). El frente de Aragón. La Guerra Civil en Aragón (1936–1938) (in Spanish). Mira Editores. ISBN 978-84-8465-237-3.
- Martínez Bande, José Manuel (1973). La Gran ofensiva sobre Zaragoza (in Spanish). Madrid: Editorial San Martín.
- Martínez Bande, José Manuel (1977). La ofensiva sobre Valencia (in Spanish). Madrid: Editorial San Martín.
- Salas Larrazábal, Ramón (2006). Historia del Ejército Popular de la República (in Spanish). La Esfera de los Libros. ISBN 84-9734-465-0.
- Sánchez Garzón, Alfredo (February 2018). "Don Joaquín Vidal Munárriz, un coronel republicano en Torrebaja (y II)". Desde el Rincón de Ademuz (in Spanish).
- Zaragoza, Cristóbal (1983). Ejército Popular y Militares de la República, 1936-1939 (in Spanish). Barcelona: Ed. Planeta.
