= 150th Illinois Infantry Regiment =

150th Regiment Illinois Volunteer Infantry
- Illinois state flag
- Active: February 14, 1865, to January 16, 1866
- Country: United States
- Allegiance: Union
- Branch: Infantry

The 150th Regiment Illinois Volunteer Infantry was an infantry regiment that served in the Union Army during the American Civil War.

== Service ==
The 150th Illinois Infantry was organized at Camp Butler, Illinois, and mustered into Federal service on February 14, 1865, for a one-year enlistment. The 150th served in garrisons in Tennessee and Georgia.

== Total strength and casualties ==
The regiment suffered 58 enlisted men who died of disease for a total of 58 fatalities.

== Commanders ==
- Colonel George W. Keener - mustered out with the regiment.

== See also ==
- List of Illinois Civil War Units
- Illinois in the American Civil War
