= 150th Mixed Brigade =

- 150.ª Brigada Mixta
- Active: June 1937–March 1939
- Country: Spain
- Allegiance: (Second Spanish Republic) Republican faction
- Branch: Spanish Republican Army
- Type: Infantry
- Size: Brigade
- Engagements: Spanish Civil War: Siege of Madrid

The 150th Mixed Brigade was a unit of the Spanish Republican Army created during the Spanish Civil War. Located in front of Madrid, it did not play a relevant role throughout the war.

== History ==
The unit was created on 11 June 1937 in Madrid with battalions from the 7th, 43rd, 67th and 75th mixed brigades, initially receiving reinforcements from Mixed Brigade «A». It received its definitive numbering after the Battle of Brunete, which had previously been used by an International Brigade.

The initial commander of the brigade was the infantry commander Ángel Roig Jorquera, who shortly after was replaced by the militia major Eduardo Zamora Conde. The head of the General Staff fell to the militia captain Miguel Soto Añibarro, while Francisco Ortuño was the political commissioner. During the war the brigade was assigned to the 13th and 18th divisions, remaining situated on the quiet front of Madrid. At the beginning of February 1939 it was garrisoning the road from Pozuelo to Torres and the road from Campo Real to Torres, in the Corpa sector, located in front of the nationalist 13th Division.

== Command ==
Commanders

- Infantry Commander Ángel Roig Jorquera;
- Militia major Eduardo Zamora Conde;
- Militia major Vicente Ibars Ronda;

Commissars

- Óscar Sánchez Gil, of the PS/CNT;

== Bibliography ==
- Álvarez, Santiago (1989). Los comisarios políticos en el Ejército Popular de la República (in Spanish). Ediciós do Castro.
- Engel, Carlos (1999). Historia de las brigadas mixtas del Ejército Popular de la República (in Spanish). Almena Ediciones.
