= 150th Division (1st Formation) (People's Republic of China) =

150th Division (1949)
- Active: 1949.1 - 1949.8
- Country: People's Republic of China
- Branch: People's Liberation Army
- Type: Division
- Role: Infantry
- Part of: 50th Corps
- Engagements: Chinese Civil War

The 150th Division(Chinese: 第150师)(1st Formation) was created in January 1949 under the Regulation of the Redesignations of All Organizations and Units of the Army, issued by Central Military Commission on November 1, 1948, basing on the 52nd Temporary Division, 60th Corps of Republic of China Army defected in Changchun.

The division was a part of 50th Corps.

In August 1949 the division was disbanded and absorbed by 148th and 149th Divisions from the same Corps.
