= 150th Regiment =

150th Regiment may refer to:

- 150th Aviation Regiment (United States)
- 150th Cavalry Regiment, United States
- 150th Field Artillery Regiment, United States
- 150th Fighter-Bomber Aviation Regiment, Yugoslav Air Force
- 150th Infantry Regiment (France)
- 150th (The Loyals) Light Anti-Aircraft Regiment, Royal Artillery
- 150th (South Nottinghamshire Hussars) Regiment, Royal Horse Artillery
- 150 Regiment RLC, United Kingdom Territorial Army

== American Civil War regiments ==
- 150th Illinois Infantry Regiment
- 150th Indiana Infantry Regiment
- 150th New York Infantry Regiment
- 150th Ohio Infantry Regiment
- 150th Pennsylvania Infantry Regiment
