= 43rd Mixed Brigade =

- 43.ª Brigada Mixta
- Active: 31 December 1936–March 1939
- Country: Spain
- Allegiance: (Second Spanish Republic) Republican faction
- Branch: Spanish Republican Army
- Type: Infantry
- Size: Brigade
- Engagements: Spanish Civil War

Commanders
- Notable commanders: Juan Arce Mayora

The 43rd Mixed Brigade was a unit of the Spanish Republican Army that took part in the Spanish Civil War. During the war it came to operate on the Madrid, Levante and Extremadura fronts.

== History ==
The unit was created on 26 November 1936 from the forces commanded by Lieutenant Colonel Juan Arce Mayora on the Madrid front, in addition to troops from the Escobar Column — which was composed of members of the old Land and Freedom Column and by civil guards from the 19th Tercio of Barcelona. Later, militia forces were added from the Toledo sector. Initially, the unit was called mixed brigade "A".

On 31 December 1936, the 43rd Mixed Brigade was added to the 6th Division of the Madrid Army Corps. For more than a year the unit remained located on the Madrid front, without taking part in relevant military operations. In mid-1938, before the nationalist offensive it was sent to the Levante front where it was incorporated into the 52nd Division and operated in the Catarroja sector. In August, the brigade was sent to the Extremadura front, being placed in reserve at Hinojosa del Duque. (Note: At the end of 1938 it was added to the "F" column commanded by the militia major Bartolomé Fernández Sánchez. According to Francisco Moreno Gómez the brigade took part in the Battle of Valsequillo, in January 1939, advancing towards Monterrubio de la Serena.) It remained situated on this front until the end of the war. The unit ceased to exist at the end of March 1939.

During its existence, the 43rd Mixed Brigade published a newspaper called "Frente de Extremadura".

== Controls ==
- Lieutenant Colonel Juan Arce Mayora;
- Militia major Victoriano González Marcos;
- Militia major Antolín Serrano García;
- Militia major Miguel Torrús Palomo;

Commissioners

- Rafael Sobrado Cossío;
- Alberto Barral López;

Chiefs of Staff

- Commander of the General Staff Federico de la Iglesia Navarro;
- Militia captain José Vallejo González;

== Bibliography ==
- Alpert, Michael (1989). El Ejército republicano en la guerra civil (in Spanish). Siglo XXI Editores.
- Álvarez, Santiago (1989). Los comisarios políticos en el Ejército Popular de la República (in Spanish). Ediciós do Castro.
- Aróstegui, Julio (1988). Historia y memoria de la Guerra Civil. Encuentro en Castilla y León: Salamanca, 24-27 de septiembre de 1986 (in Spanish). Junta de Castilla y León.
- Engel, Carlos (1999). Historia de las Brigadas Mixtas del Ejército Popular de la República (in Spanish). Madrid: Almena. 84-922644-7-0.
- Moreno Gómez, Francisco (1985). La Guerra civil en Córdoba (1936-1939) (in Spanish). Córdoba: Alpuerto.
- Ramos-Gascón, Antonio (1978). El Romancero del Ejército Popular (in Spanish). Editorial Nuestra Cultura.
