= Maroto Column =

Anarchist militia column during the Spanish Civil War

- Columna Maroto
- Active: 6 August 1936–February 1937
- Country: Spain
- Allegiance: Confederación Nacional del Trabajo
- Branch: Confederal militias
- Type: Militia column
- Size: 270 (August 1936)
- Garrison/HQ: Guadix, Granada
- Colours: Red; Black
- Engagements: Spanish Civil War: Granada front; Battle of Málaga

Commanders
- Commander: Francisco Maroto

The Maroto Column (Spanish: Columna Maroto) was a column of the confederal militias that fought in the Spanish Civil War. Established in Alicante under the command of Francisco Maroto, it attempted to march on Nationalist-held Granada, but was halted in the Sierra Nevada. Following the Nationalist victory in the Battle of Málaga, the Column accepted its own militarisation and reconstituted itself as the 147th Mixed Brigade.

== Granada front ==
Following the outbreak of the Spanish Civil War, the Maroto Column was established in Alicante, on 6 August 1936. It was initially made up of 270 militiamen. It was named after its commander, the Andalusian anarchist Francisco Maroto. From Alicante, the Maroto Column marched towards Granada and dug in at Baza, in the north of the province. They went on to fight against the Nationalists in the Sierra Nevada.

The Column got as far at the town of Güéjar Sierra, but never made it to the city of Granada itself, as they had too little ammunition to engage in battle for the city. The Column brought food and clothing to the villages of Güéjar Sierra, where they also established a trade union of the Confederación Nacional del Trabajo (CNT). The Column subsequently established its headquarters in Guadix. There, the Column published its own newspaper, Hombres Libres. It also opened its field hospital to the public.

== Militarisation ==
Following a series of Republican military defeats, in October 1936, the government issued a decree ordering the militarisation of the confederal militias. The Maroto Column staunchly opposed militarisation, declaring the civil war and the revolution to be "inseparabable". Holding their position on this was made more difficult in February 1937, when the Nationalists won the Battle of Málaga; the city's defenders, low on ammunition and without government support, were forced to flee the city.

To discuss the proposed militarisation, the Maroto Column called a plenum of militia columns. The Column itself was unable to attend, as it was busy fighting against the Nationalist offensive on Málaga. After a lengthy internal debate and under pressure from the CNT, the Maroto Column eventually agreed to the militarisation. Toribio Martinez Cabrera, the chief of staff of the Spanish Republican Army, authorised the Maroto Column to establish a brigade composed exclusively of members from its own unit. The Column was subsequently integrated into the 147th Mixed Brigade, which Maroto took command of.

Later that month, the former Maroto Column organised a political demonstration against the Republican civil governor of Granada province, protesting against alleged "abuses" against anarchists. The demonstration culminated with Maroto leading armed militiamen on horseback into the governor's residence, which provoked the Assault Guards to arrest him. Maroto was sentenced to execution by a military tribunal in Almería, but his sentence was commuted in January 1938, following protests by the Libertarian Youth.

== Bibliography ==
- Bolloten, Burnett (1991). The Spanish Civil War: Revolution and Counterrevolution. University of North Carolina Press. ISBN 978-0-8078-1906-7.
- Brown, Henry (2023). ""¡Vivan las tribus!": persecution, resistance and anarchist agency in the Popular Army during the Spanish Civil War (1936-9)". Journal of Iberian and Latin American Studies. 29 (3): 357–379. doi:10.1080/14701847.2023.2282836.
- Brown, Henry (2024). "The Anarchist in Uniform: The Militarisation of Anarchist Culture during the Spanish Civil War (1936–1939)". Contemporary European History. 33 (1): 305–322. doi:10.1017/S0960777322000285.
- Evans, Danny (2018). Revolution and the State: Anarchism in the Spanish Civil War, 1936–1939. Routledge. ISBN 978-1-138-06314-3.
- Granada, CNT (July 2012). "Adela García Murillo". KSL: Bulletin of the Kate Sharpley Library (70–71). Translated by Sharkey, Paul. ISSN 1475-0309.
- Paz, Abel (2011). The Story of the Iron Column: Militant Anarchism in the Spanish Civil War. AK Press. ISBN 978-1-84935-064-8.
- Ramírez Navarro, Antonio (2018). Aunque nos espere el dolor y la muerte. Historia del movimiento libertario en Almería (in Spanish). University of Almería. ISBN 9788417261320. OCLC 1083797930.
- Ramos, Vicente (1972). La guerra civil (1936-1939) en la provincia de Alicante (in Spanish). Biblioteca Alicantina. ISBN 9788430055050. OCLC 807286629.
