= 214th Mixed Brigade =

- 214.ª Brigada Mixta
- Active: August 1937–March 1939
- Country: Spain
- Allegiance: (Second Spanish Republic) Republican faction
- Branch: Spanish Republican Army
- Type: Infantry
- Size: Brigade
- Part of: 66th Division
- Engagements: Spanish Civil War

Commanders
- Notable commanders: Rafael Trigueros; Francisco del Castillo

The 214th Mixed Brigade was a unit of the People's Army of the Republic created during the Spanish Civil War.

== History ==
It was created on 24 August 1937 in the area of La Solana, under the command of the infantry commander Rafael Trigueros, although the training period didn't end until November. It was integrated into the 66th Division. In turn, the command of the brigade passed to the militia major Francisco del Castillo Sáenz de Tejada.

At the beginning of January 1938, it was sent to the Aragon front to participate in the Battle of Teruel. Once it fell, the 214th Mixed Brigade joined with the rest of the 66th Division in the Francisco Galán Grouping, which had the mission of defending the recently conquered city. It took part in an attack on the position of "El Muletón" and shortly after it was sent to the Alfambra sector. There it was surprised in its positions by the Battle of Alfambra, having to withdraw. It no longer took part in relevant military actions, maintaining its positions in the Rincón de Ademuz area.

During the rest of the war, it did not take part in relevant military actions again.

== Command ==
Commanders-in-chief

- Infantry Commander Rafael Trigueros;
- Militia major Francisco del Castillo;
- Militia major Manuel García Fernández

Commissars

- Joaquín Rodríguez Castro;
- Rafael García Muñoz, of the CNT;

== Bibliography ==
- Alpert, Michael (1989). El ejército republicano en la guerra civil (in Spanish). Siglo XXI Editores.
- Álvarez, Santiago (1989). Los comisarios políticos en el Ejército Popular de la República (in Spanish). Ediciós do Castro.
- Casas de la Vega, Rafael (1976). Alfambra. La reconquista de Teruel (in Spanish). L. de Caralt.
- Engel, Carlos (1999). Historia de las Brigadas Mixtas del Ejército Popular de la República (in Spanish). Madrid: Almena. ISBN 84-922644-7-0.
- Maldonado, José M.ª (2007). El frente de Aragón. La Guerra Civil en Aragón (1936–1938) (in Spanish). Mira Editores. ISBN 978-84-8465-237-3.
