= Third Battle of the Corunna Road =

Spanish Civil War battle

The Third Battle of the Corunna Road took place during the Spanish Civil War in January 1937, as a further attempt following the Second Battle of the Corunna Road by the Nationalist forces to cut the Republican link between Madrid and the Sierra de Guadarrama and so intensify the siege of Madrid. The Nationalist managed to take a large section of the road itself, but failed to take the open countryside which would have enabled them to encircle Madrid.
