= 141st Mixed Brigade =

- 141.ª Brigada Mixta
- Active: May 1937–February 1939
- Country: Spain
- Allegiance: (Second Spanish Republic) Republican faction
- Branch: Spanish Republican Army
- Type: Infantry
- Size: Brigade
- Engagements: Spanish Civil War: Huesca Offensive; Zaragoza Offensive; Aragon Offensive; Battle of the Segre; Battle of the Ebro; Catalonia Offensive; Battle of Belchite

Commanders
- Notable commanders: Eduardo Barceló Llacuri

The 141st Mixed Brigade was a unit of the Spanish Republican Army during the Spanish Civil War. It participated in the Battle of Belchite, Aragon Offensive, Battle of the Segre and the Catalonia Offensive.

== History ==
The 141st Mixed Brigade was created in May 1937 as a reserve of the Eastern Army and integrated into the 32nd Division of the X Army Corps. It was mainly made up of anarchist militiamen. Although its first commander was Sebastián Zamora Medina, shortly afterwards the command of the unit passed to Eduardo Barceló Llacuri.

After completing their training, the brigade was sent to the Huesca front. For the Zaragoza Offensive it stationed itself in Castellnou as a reserve and, on September 27, entered combat to support the XII International Brigade in the Villamayor sector. Later, Barceló was prosecuted for the shooting of a militia unit of the POUM, as was his successor, Bosch Montes. During the withdrawal from Aragón the brigade covered the Quinto sector and was overwhelmed by nationalist troops who attacked at this point, concentrating their remains in Montgay. Later the brigade took part in the fighting at the bridgehead of Balaguer, before moving to the Artesa de Segre sector. During the Battle of the Ebro, one of the unit's battalions participated in the combat.

On January 14, 1939, while the Catalonia Offensive was taking place, the brigade was positioned in a defensive line trying to defend Cervera, although it was lost the next day. It withdrew to Calaf and later to the Manresa-Vic area to continue the general withdrawal towards the French border.

== Command ==
Commanders

- Francisco del Castillo Sáenz de Tejada;
- Sebastián Zamora Medina;
- Eduardo Barceló Llacuri;
- Emilio Bosch Montes;

Commissars

- Justino Villaverde Ramos, of the CNT;

Chief of Staff

- Hernández Oñate;

== Bibliography ==
- Álvarez, Santiago (1989). Los comisarios políticos en el Ejército Popular de la República (in Spanish). Ediciós do Castro.
- Engel, Carlos (2005). Historia de las Brigadas Mixtas del Ejército Popular de la República (in Spanish). Madrid: Almena. ISBN 84-922644-7-0.
