= Eastern Region Army Group =

Eastern Region Army Group Grupo de Ejércitos de la Región Oriental (GERO)
- Military flag of the Popular Army
- Active: 2 June 1938 – 9 February 1939
- Country: Spain
- Branch: Spanish Republican Army
- Type: Army group
- Role: Home Defence
- Garrison/HQ: Igualada
- Engagements: Spanish Civil War: Battle of the Ebro; Battle of the Segre; Catalonia Offensive

Commanders
- Notable commanders: Juan Hernández Saravia; Enrique Jurado Barrio

Map of Spain in November 1938. In pink the two regions under Republican control.

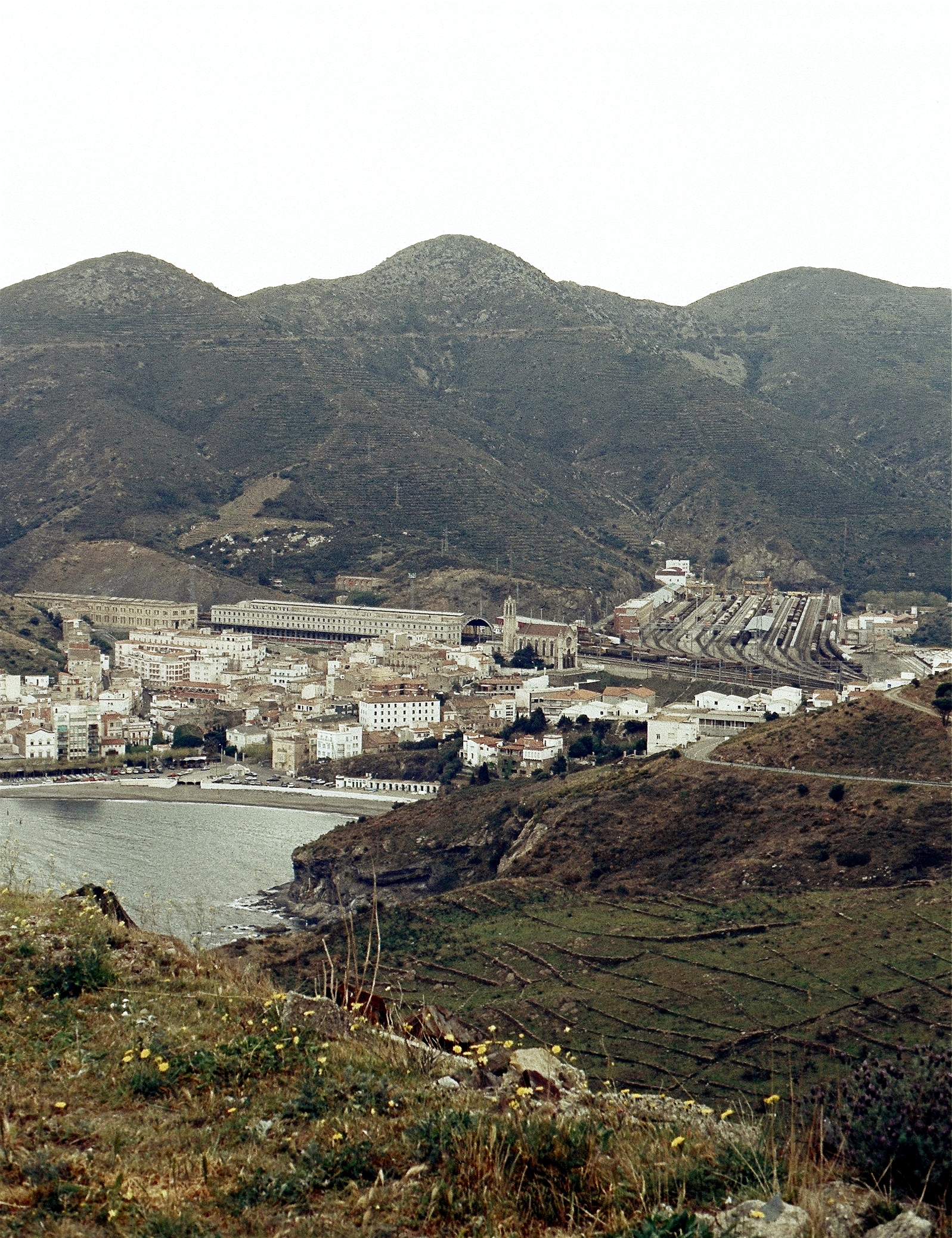
View of Portbou, one of the main border posts that were overwhelmed by defeated Spanish Republican troops and civilian refugees in early February 1939

The Eastern Region Army Group, Spanish: Grupo de Ejércitos de la Región Oriental (GERO), was a military formation of the Spanish Republican Army during the last phase of the Spanish Civil War. It was established in June 1938 as a response to the splitting in two of the territory under the sovereignty of the Spanish Republic after the Central Region Army Group (GERC), under the command of General Miaja, had been set up in the central-southern region of Spain.

This army group of the Spanish Republican military lasted until the Fall of Catalonia on 9 February 1939.

== History ==
=== The Republican territory split in two ===
Catalonia had become an isolated enclave following the rebel Aragon Offensive in the spring of 1938. Since the loyalist armies of the former Aragon Front were in a state of disarray after the Republican debacle, the President of the Spanish government Juan Negrín requested the Chief of Staff commander of the Republican Army, Vicente Rojo, to reorganize the Republican forces.

Owing to the loyalist territory having been split in two by the rebels, General Rojo saw the need of establishing two army groups in order to coordinate the specific defence requirements of each zone. Thus after the establishment of the GERO, a new Eastern Army was organized in the Catalan territory, in charge of the defensive line of the Segre River. Meanwhile, in the southern sector the Ebro Army was established, which would have as its goal to eventually reunite the northeastern Republican area with the larger zone further to the southwest. The commander of both armies was a prestigious military figure, General Juan Hernández Saravia, who had been the former commander of the Southern and the Levantine Army.

Right from the moment of its inception the Eastern army group saw action at the Segre Front where there were constant battles along a long defensive line of Republican positions and fortifications. During most of 1938 there would be numerous attacks, counterattacks and skirmishes from both sides along the Segre River. A great number of manpower and material was sent to the Eastern Army in that front, which was a crucial line for halting the devastating advances of the Francoist armies and to keep crucial hydroelectric dams from falling into the hands of the enemy. Eventually the Spanish Republic was able to hold unto that line until the beginning of January 1939 when it became impossible to keep holding the resistance in the Segre against the overwhelming pressure of the rebels.

To complement the battles in western Catalonia the high command quarters of the Republican Armed Forces, led by General Vicente Rojo, were planning a large-scale operation with the aim to reconnect the two isolated enclaves in which the Spanish Republic had been recently divided. Thus on 25 July 1938 Republican troops crossed the Ebro River successfully beginning the Battle of the Ebro. After establishing some bridgeheads, loyalist forces advanced against the rebel-held towns of Gandesa and Vilalba dels Arcs, where after weeks of intense combats the Republican counteroffensive lost steam. Although the Republican operation failed, the Ebro Army dug in within a protracted defensive battle that lasted four months. There were heavy casualties on both sides, but especially on the Republican side, which lost irreplaceable military units and most of its former high morale.

=== Catalonia Offensive ===
During the Battle of the Ebro the rebel military had inflicted severe losses to the Republican Armed Forces in Catalonia. At that critical time the GERO still had about 300,000 troops, 360 pieces of artillery and about 200 tanks and armoured vehicles. Also, the General Staff of the Republican Military had kept the commanding structure of the Eastern Region Army Group intact, still under the command of General Juan Hernández Saravia. However, after the numerous casualties —including the many invaluable battle-hardened veterans— , most of the troops of the army group were inexperienced recruits and, owing to the heavy material losses endured, the loyalist troops saw a marked reduction in their ability to operate. To compound matters, the Catalan sector was a bad strategic location bound by Francoist territory on the Spanish side, the Mediterranean Sea on the other, and, even if in the north it still held the French border, non-interventionist France was unreliable at best, when not overtly hostile to the Spanish Republic.

When the Francoist Catalonia Offensive was launched on 23 December 1938, the high command in Barcelona did not fathom that it was a large-scale attack. Thus the rebel faction troops were able to open many gaps in the Eastern Army front, causing some Republican units to flee in panic. In order to try to mend things, the elite V Army Corps led by Enrique Líster was sent to the Main Line of Resistance, but even after an intense series of combats Lister was only able to contain the massive penetration of the enemy armies for a period of twelve days at the confluence of the Ebro and the Segre Rivers. An increase of the river flow at the Ebro sector temporarily barred the feared Moroccan troops of General Juan Yagüe from crossing the river.

The Francoist attack subsided somewhat until 3 January 1939, when a Fascist Italian tank column forced a retreat of Republican troops in the Segre sector. That same day General Yagüe's Moroccan divisions successfully crossed the Ebro and established a number of bridgeheads. As a consequence of these simultaneous victories towards mid-January it became evident for the Republican armies that they were unable to halt the sheer avalanche of rebel troops that pressured their resistance lines. Putting off any idea of a counter-offensive, or even resistance, all Spanish Republican units began to withdraw towards the north. By then there was great confusion within Republican ranks and Hernández Saravia informed President Manuel Azaña that his troops had only 17,000 guns. Actually, although ill-equipped, the number of guns that the Republican troops had was far higher, but this arbitrary comment is an illustration of the administrative chaos that preceded the Fall of Catalonia.

=== The Fall of Barcelona and the end of the GERO ===
Following the Fall of Barcelona on 27 January, Juan Hernández Saravia was relieved of his duties as leader of the Eastern Region Army Group, allegedly for his "defeatism" (derrotismo), but the real motives went far deeper. General Hernández Saravia had fallen from grace because his views had often conflicted with those of the Chief of the General Staff of the Central Region, Vicente Rojo, and the President of the Council of Ministers, Juan Negrín. Hernández Saravia had tried to replace Juan Modesto, the head of the Ebro Army, whom he saw as self-important and not up to the mark and hand over the command to Juan Perea, the more competent commander of the Eastern Army, but Modesto was protected by the highest leaders of the doomed Spanish Republic.

In an eleventh-hour decision the command of the Eastern Region Army Group was transferred to Enrique Jurado Barrio, but he was not able to organize a line of defence while the whole Northeastern section of the Republican Army was unfit for battle and in the middle of a hasty retreat. Cold, ill-equipped and hungry both the troops and the average citizens were exhausted and had stopped listening to the official propaganda telling that a victory against Fascism was at hand; fear was the pervading mood and what most hoped was not to be treated too badly by the advancing Francoists during the purge of the conquered territory. Since Barcelona was already in rebel hands the most that Jurado Barrio could do was to try to limit the chaos of the desperate withdrawal of the long civilian and military columns towards the border and to evacuate the demoralized Republican troops in a manner as orderly as possible.

By 5 February most of the military units of the Spanish Republic had crossed the border into France, where all Spanish Republicans were arrested by the authorities and sent to French concentration camps. On 10 February, when the Francoist forces reached the frontier posts, the Eastern Region Army Group was already history.

== Structure ==
The Eastern Region Army Group included the armies that were defending Catalonia that were still loyal to the Spanish Republic led by General Juan Hernández Saravia. It was composed by the following armies:

- Eastern Army, Ejército del Este.
- Ebro Army, Ejército del Ebro. Built upon the Agrupación Autónoma del Ebro that had gathered all the Republican units that had become isolated north of the Ebro River. It would fight the Battle of the Ebro

=== Order of battle ===
==== July 1938 ====
Army Corps	Divisions	Sectors
Eastern Army
X Army Corps	30th, 31st, 34th	Balaguer-Segre
XI Army Corps	26th, 32nd & 55th	Noguera Pallaresa
XVIII Army Corps	27th, 60th & 72nd	General Reserve
Ebro Army
V Army Corps	11th, 46th, 45th	Lower Ebro
XII Army Corps	16th, 44th & 56th	General Reserve
XV Army Corps	3rd, 35th & 42nd	Lower Ebro
GERO Strategic Reserve
XXIV Army Corps	43rd & 62nd	General Reserve

==== December 1938 ====
Army Corps	Divisions	Sectors
Eastern Army
X Army Corps	30th, 31st, 34th	Balaguer-Segre
XI Army Corps	26th, 32nd & 55th	Noguera Pallaresa
XVIII Army Corps	27th, 60th & 72nd	General Reserve
Ebro Army
V Army Corps	11th, 46th, 45th	Lower Ebro
XII Army Corps	16th, 44th & 56th	General Reserve
XV Army Corps	3rd, 35th & 42nd	Lower Ebro
XXIV Army Corps	43rd & 62nd	General Reserve

=== Command ===
Commander in chief

- General of the artillery brigade Juan Hernández Saravia (1938-1939).
- Brigadier General Enrique Jurado Barrio (1939).

Commissar

- Ángel González-Gil Roldán, of the CNT.

Chiefs of Staff

- Lieutenant Colonel of the General Staff Aurelio Matilla Jimeno.
  - 2nd Chief of Staff: Lieutenant Colonel José Coello de Portugal Maisonnave.

General Commander of Artillery

- Lieutenant colonel of artillery Carlos Botet Vehí.

General Commander of Engineers

- Lieutenant Colonel of engineers Fernández Llerena.

Quartermaster

- Lieutenant colonel of administration Fernando Sabio Dutoit.

Transportation

- Lieutenant colonel of artillery Julio Álvarez Cerón.

Transmissions

- Lieutenant Colonel of engineers Rafael Rodríguez Seijas.

Anti-Aircraft Defense

- Lieutenant colonel of artillery José Álvarez Cerón.

== See also ==
- Spanish Civil War, 1938–39
- Final offensive of the Spanish Civil War
- Group of Central Region Armies Grupo de Ejércitos de la Región Central (GERC)

== Bibliography ==
- Michael Alpert (1989); El Ejército Republicano en la Guerra Civil, Siglo XXI de España, Madrid.ISBN 978-84-323-0682-2
- Engel, Carlos (1999). Historia de las Brigadas Mixtas del ejército popular de la República : 1936-1939 (2. rev ed.). Madrid: Almena. ISBN 84-96170-19-5.
- Helen Graham (2003). The Spanish Republic at War 1936-1939. Cambridge University Press. ISBN 978-0521459327.
- Ramón Salas Larrazábal (2006); Historia del Ejército Popular de la República. La Esfera de los Libros S.L. ISBN 84-9734-465-0
- Thomas, Hugh (1976). Historia de la Guerra Civil Española. Barcelona: Círculo de Lectores. ISBN 84-226-0874-X.
