= 140th Mixed Brigade =

- 140.ª Brigada Mixta
- Active: May 1937–February 1939
- Country: Spain
- Allegiance: (Second Spanish Republic) Republican faction
- Branch: Spanish Republican Army
- Type: Infantry
- Size: Brigade
- Engagements: Spanish Civil War: Aragon Offensive; Battle of Lleida; Battle of the Ebro; Catalonia Offensive

Commanders
- Notable commanders: Eusebio Sanz

The 140th Mixed Brigade was a unit of the Spanish Republican Army created during the Spanish Civil War. Throughout the war it operated on the fronts of Aragon, Segre, Ebro and Catalonia.

== History ==
The unit was created in May 1937, originally as a reserve force of the Eastern Army, although later it was integrated into the 32nd Division of the XI Army Corps. It was under the command of Humberto Gil Cabrera, with Manuel Tió Vila as chief of staff and with Luis Deltell Bernal as commissar. Once the brigade finished its training phase, the command passed to Rodolfo Bosch Pearson, but he ended up being replaced by Eusebio Sanz after Bosch was prosecuted for the execution of some militiamen from the POUM. Subsequently, the 140th Mixed Brigade was assigned to the 33rd Division in order to take part in the Battle of Brunete, although in the end the brigade remained located in Tarragona without taking part in the Brunete operations.

In March 1938, after the start of the Aragon Offensive, it was assigned to the 24th Division and sent as reinforcement to the threatened sector; However, on March 11, the brigade withdrew from Pina until it reached Fraga, on March 26. Some elements of the 140th Mixed Brigade participated in the defense of Lleida, but after the fall of the city they crossed the river and withdrew towards Llardecans. It was subjected to a reorganization, being added to the 44th Division.

On September 13, the 140th Mixed Brigade was sent to the Ebro front, as a reinforcement of the Republican forces in this sector. On September 19, it relieved the 227th Mixed Brigade in the area northwest of La Pobla de Massaluca, the position in which it remained until October 6 – when it was replaced by the XIII International Brigade. Unlike other Republican units, in this period the 140th Mixed Brigade did not participate in heavy fighting. Three days later, on October 9, it had to return to the battle front in the area of Venta de Camposines. On October 15, it had to withstand a strong enemy onslaught, although it maintained its positions at the cost of some casualties — notably the death of the chief of the 560th battalion, Vicente Sagarduy. On November 8, during the last nationalist counteroffensive, the 140th Mixed Brigade was encircled by its company of machine guns and by a company of the 559th Battalion, which resulted in serious casualties. Three days later, due to the withdrawal of the 226th Mixed Brigade, it suffered a new enemy encirclement that caused heavy losses to the unit; severely broken, on November 13, it crossed the Ebro through the Flix area.

Once again attached to the 44th Division, it was assigned to the Serós bridgehead sector. However, after the start of the Catalonia Offensive the brigade had to withdraw. By January 13, 1939, it was defending the Sierra de Prades, but after the fall of Tarragona it withdrew towards the French border.

== Command ==
Commanders

- Humberto Gil Cabrera;
- Rodolfo Bosch Pearson;
- Eusebio Sanz;
- José Peirats Almela;

Commissars

- Luis Deltell Bernal, of the PSUC;
- Ángel Marcos Salas, of the CNT;

== Bibliography ==
- Alpert, Michael (1989). El ejército republicano en la guerra civil (in Spanish). Siglo XXI Editores.
- Álvarez, Santiago (1989). Los comisarios políticos en el Ejército Popular de la República (in Spanish). Ediciós do Castro.
- Cabrera Castillo, Francisco (2002). Del Ebro a Gandesa. La batalla del Ebro, julio-noviembre 1938 (in Spanish). Almena.
- Engel, Carlos (1999). Historia de las Brigadas Mixtas del Ejército Popular de la República (in Spanish). Madrid: Almena. ISBN 84-922644-7-0.
- Zaragoza, Cristóbal (1983). Ejército Popular y Militares de la República, 1936-1939 (in Spanish). Barcelona: Ed. Planeta.
