= XI Army Corps (Spain) =

- XI Cuerpo de Ejército (Bando republicano)
- Active: June 1937–February 1939
- Country: Spanish Republic
- Allegiance: Spanish Republic Republican faction
- Branch: Spanish Republican Army
- Type: Infantry
- Size: Army Corps
- Garrison/HQ: Sariñena
- Engagements: Spanish Civil War: Zaragoza Offensive; Battle of Belchite; Aragon Offensive; Battle of the Segre; Catalonia Offensive

The XI Army Corps was a military formation belonging to the Spanish Republican Army that fought during the Spanish Civil War. During the war it was deployed on the fronts of Aragon, Segre and Catalonia.

== History ==
The unit was created in June 1937, within the Eastern Army. It was made up of the divisions 26th, 27th and 32nd, having its headquarters in Sariñena. It covered the front line that ran from the south of Huesca —in union with the X Army Corps – to the Ebro river – where, in turn, it united with the XII Army Corps. During the following months some of its forces intervened in the Zaragoza and Belchite offensives, which, however, did not bear the desired results.

In the spring of 1938, during the Aragon campaign, the forces of the XI Army Corps were unable to cope with the pressure of the nationalist units. By early April, the remnants of the army corps had established their positions along the defensive line of the Segre river. During the following months it did not take part in relevant military operations, reorganizing its battered forces after the withdrawal in Aragon. After the beginning of the Catalonia campaign, they maintained resistance in their defensive positions, some units managing to offer strong opposition —as was the case with the 26th Division. Despite this, the enemy pressure did not subside and at the beginning of 1939 the XI Army Corps was forced to withdraw towards the French border along with the rest of the Eastern Army.

== Command ==
Commanders

- Alfonso Reyes González-Cárdenas; (Note: Previously, Alfonso Reyes had served as chief of the Spanish Republican Air Force at the Aragon front.)
- Antonio Gil Otero;
- Bartolomé Muntané Cirici;
- Francisco Galán Rodríguez;
- Manuel Márquez Sánchez de Movellán;

Commissars

- Juan Manuel Molina Mateo, of the CNT;
- Julián Muñoz Lizcano, of the PSOE;

Chiefs of Staff

- Ricardo Clavería Iglesias;
- Mariano Fernández Berbiela;
- Antonio Muñoz Lizcano;

== Order of Battle ==
| Date | Attached Army | Integrated divisions | Battlefront |
|---|---|---|---|
| June 1937 | Eastern Army | 26th, 27th and 32nd | Aragon |
| October 1937 | Eastern Army | 26th, 32nd, 44th and 45th | Aragon |
| December 1937 | Eastern Army | 26th and 32nd | Aragon |
| April 19, 1938 | Eastern Army | 26th, 30th and 32nd | Segre |
| September 3, 1938 | Eastern Army | 26th and 34th | Segre |
| December 1938 | Eastern Army | 26th, 30th and 32nd | Segre |
| January 2, 1939 | Eastern Army | 30th and 31st | Segre |

== Bibliography ==
- Álvarez, Santiago (1989). Los comisarios políticos en el Ejército Popular de la República (in Spanish). Ediciós do Castro.
- Alpert, Michael (2013). The Republican Army in the Spanish Civil War, 1936–1939. Cambridge University Press.
- Engel, Carlos (1999). Historia de las Brigadas Mixtas del Ejército Popular de la República (in Spanish). Madrid: Almena. ISBN 84-922644-7-0.
- Maldonado, José María (2007). El frente de Aragón. La Guerra Civil en Aragón (1936-1938) (in Spanish). Mira Ediciones. ISBN 978-84-8465-237-3.
- Martínez Bande, José Manuel (1973). La Gran ofensiva sobre Zaragoza (in Spanish). Madrid: Editorial San Martín.
- Martínez Bande, José Manuel (1975). La llegada al mar (in Spanish). Madrid: San Martín. ISBN 84-7140-115-0.
- Martínez Bande, José Manuel (1979). La Campaña de Cataluña (in Spanish). Madrid: San Martín.
- Thomas, Hugh (1976). Historia de la Guerra Civil Española (in Spanish). Barcelona: Círculo de Lectores. ISBN 84-226-0874-X.
