= X Army Corps (Spain) =

- X Cuerpo de Ejército
- Active: June 1937–February 1939
- Country: Spain
- Allegiance: (Second Spanish Republic) Republican faction
- Branch: Spanish Republican Army
- Type: Infantry
- Size: Army Corps
- Part of: Eastern Army
- Garrison/HQ: Barbastro
- Engagements: Spanish Civil War: Huesca Offensive; Zaragoza Offensive; Battle of Sabiñánigo; Aragon Offensive; Battle of the Segre; Balaguer Offensive; Catalonia Offensive

Commanders
- Notable commanders: Gregorio Jover Cortés

The X Army Corps was a military formation belonging to the Spanish Republican Army that fought during the Spanish Civil War. During the war it was deployed on the fronts of Aragon, Segre and Catalonia.

== History ==
The unit was created in June 1937, within the Eastern Army. It covered the front line that ran from the French border to the Sierra de Alcubierre, with its headquarters in Barbastro. During the following months some of its forces intervened in the offensives of Huesca (June), Zaragoza (August) and Biescas (September-October), which, however, did not bear the desired results: both Huesca and Jaca remained in the hands of the nationalist forces.

In the spring of 1938, during the Aragon Campaign, the X Army Corps performed poorly. From the first moment its forces fell back from the enemy push, particularly the 31st Division, whose withdrawal —Which eventually became a rout— left the southern flank of the 43rd Division unprotected. (Note: The 43rd Division had to withdraw and was surrounded in what was known as the Bielsa pocket.) At the beginning of April the X Army Corps, after a long retreat, they maintained their positions on the defensive line of the Segre River. Some elements of its 34th Division intervened in the Balaguer Offensive at the end of May. At the beginning of the Catalonia Campaign, the X Army Corps continued to cover the Segre line. Its troops offered resistance to the nationalist assault, although at the beginning of 1939 the formation was forced to withdraw towards the French border along with the rest of the Eastern Army.

== Command ==
Commanders

- José González Morales;
- Juan Perea Capulino;
- Miguel Gallo Martínez;
- Rafael Trigueros Sánchez-Rojas;
- Gregorio Jover Cortés;

Commissars

- Julián Borderas Pallaruelo, of the PSOE;
- Gregorio Villacampa Gracia, of the CNT;
- Juan Manuel Molina, of the CNT;

Chiefs of Staff

- Joaquín Alonso García;
- Pascual Miñana de la Concepción;
- Magín Doménech Pujol; (Note: He had previously served as Chief of Staff of the 34th Division.)
- Enrique López Pérez;

== Order of Battle ==
Date	Attached Army	Integrated divisions	Battlefront
June 1937	Eastern Army	28th, 29th and 43rd	Aragon
July 17, 1937	Eastern Army	28th, 31st and 43rd	Aragon
December 1937	Eastern Army	31st and 43rd	Aragon
May 1938	Eastern Army	24th and 34th	Segre
September 3, 1938	Eastern Army	31st and 55th	Segre
December 27, 1938	Eastern Army	31st, 32nd and 55th	Segre
January 2, 1939	Eastern Army	32nd, 34th and 55th	Segre

== Bibliography ==
- Álvarez, Santiago (1989). Los comisarios políticos en el Ejército Popular de la República (in Spanish). Ediciós do Castro.
- Alpert, Michael (2013). The Republican Army in the Spanish Civil War, 1936-1939. Cambridge University Press.
- de Paz Sánchez, Manuel (2004). Militares masones de España: diccionario biográfico del siglo XX (in Spanish). UNED Alzira-Valencia.
- Engel, Carlos (1999). Historia de las Brigadas Mixtas del Ejército Popular de la República (in Spanish). Madrid: Almena. ISBN 84-922644-7-0.
- Maldonado, José María (2007). El frente de Aragón. La Guerra Civil en Aragón (1936-1938) (in Spanish). Mira Ediciones. ISBN 978-84-8465-237-3.
- Martínez Bande, José Manuel (1975). La llegada al mar (in Spanish). Madrid: San Martín. ISBN 84-7140-115-0.
- Martínez Bande, José Manuel (1979). La Campaña de Cataluña (in Spanish). Madrid: San Martín.
- Ripol, Marc (2007). Las rutas del exilio (in Spanish). Barcelona: Alhena ediciones.
- Tuñón de Lara, Manuel (2000). La España del siglo XX (in Spanish). Vol. III. Madrid: Akal. ISBN 84-460-1105-0.
