= 26th Division (Spain) =

- 26ª División
- Flag of the 26th Division
- Active: 28 April 1937–10 February 1939
- Country: Spain
- Allegiance: Republican faction
- Branch: People's Army of Catalonia (1937); People's Army of the Republic (1937–1939)
- Type: Infantry division
- Role: Home defense
- Size: Three mixed brigades: 119th, 120th and 121st
- Part of: XI Army Corps
- Garrison/HQ: Bujaraloz (1937–1938); Artesa de Segre (1938–1939)
- Nickname: Durruti Division
- Engagements: Spanish Civil War: Siege of Madrid; Battle of Belchite; Battle of Teruel; Aragon Offensive; Battle of the Segre; Battle of the Ebro; Catalonia Offensive

Commanders
- Commander-in-chief: Ricardo Sanz
- Political commissar: Ricardo Rionda
- Chief of staff: Ramón Rodríguez Bosmediano

The 26th Division (Spanish: 26ª División) was a division of the Spanish Republican Army during the Spanish Civil War. It was formed in April 1937 in Aragon, from the militarised Durruti Column, during the reorganisation of the Spanish Republican Armed Forces. It fought in the Battle of Belchite, the Aragon Offensive and the Battle of the Segre. Finally, it was disbanded in February 1939 after the withdrawal and rush to the border that followed the rebel Catalonia Offensive.

== Siege of Madrid (November 1936 – April 1937) ==
After the death of Buenaventura Durruti during the battle of Ciudad Universitaria in November 1936, the leaders of the National Confederation of Labour (CNT) appointed Ricardo Sanz to take over command of the Durruti Column in Madrid. Before the outbreak of the Spanish Civil War, Sanz had been a construction worker and a member of the Nosotros anarchist group; during the first months of the war, he had worked as a militia organiser for the Central Committee of Anti-Fascist Militias of Catalonia. In Madrid, Sanz found the militiamen of the Column demoralised and many wanted to return to the Aragon front, but he and Federica Montseny managed to convince the majority of them to remain in Madrid and defend the city. After receiving reinforcements from Catalonia, they returned to the front lines in the Casa de Campo.

In December 1936, the Nationalists launched another offensive, attempting to capture El Pardo and outflank the Republican defenses. On 6 January, the Column was pinned down at Casa Quemada, with the units on either side of them having abandoned their posts. When lieutenant Joaquín Morlanes Jaulín called Sanz up for reinforcements, Sanz himself led a small group of men to the front and took up a post at a machine gun nest. He explained that their reservist unit had refused to go to the front and instead held an assembly to decide what to do, so he went himself. Morlanes Jaulín convinced him that, as commander of the unit, he ought to be organising a defensive line that the Column could fall back to. He did so and the Nationalists were subsequently defeated at the secondary line he had established. In anarchist historiography, the Republican victory in the battle of Madrid is often attributed to the Durruti Column and Mera Column.

== Militarisation (April–May 1937) ==
While the Battle of Madrid was ongoing, in November 1936, the leadership of the CNT formed an agreement with the government of Francisco Largo Caballero on the militarisation of the anarchist militias, under the condition that they would remain under anarchist control. Under this process, the militia columns were reorganised into numbered divisions of the Spanish Republican Army, given military uniforms and ranks to distinguish officers from enlisted men, and required to salute. The Catalan militia columns in Aragon were reorganised into divisions of the People's Army of Catalonia, where unlike the Spanish Republican Army, they were permitted to keep their names; the Durruti Column in Aragon became the Durruti Division. Although previously an anti-militarist, Sanz's experiences during the battle of Madrid convinced him of the need for militarisation and converted him from a militia leader into a military officer. Once the Madrid front stabilised in April 1937, the Catalan government then ordered the Madrid part of the Durruti Column to return to the Aragon front, where it was reunited with the Durruti Division.

With the outbreak of the May Days of 1937, some units of the Division assembled in Barbastro and intended to march on Barcelona, but they stood down after hearing an appeal from Joan Garcia Oliver. In the wake of the uprising, the Spanish Republican government reestablished its authority in Catalonia and abolished the People's Army of Catalonia, replacing it with a new Army of the East. The Durruti Division was then reorganised into the 26th Division of the Spanish Republican Army. Sanz remained in command of the new division. The Division published an irregular newspaper, El Frente, which reported on the issues that were affecting it. According to military historian Michael Alpert, the 26th Division would be one of only a few Republican units with the necessary unit cohesion to act under self-discipline, while most others required a more strictly-imposed military discipline.

== Conflict with the Communists (May–September 1937) ==
Anarchist resistance to the militarisation process limited the number of anarchist promotions to officer ranks and prevented them from maintaining their influence within the new Republican Army, which over time fell increasingly under the control of the Communist Party of Spain (PCE). When Largo Caballero was ousted and the government was brought under the control of Juan Negrín and Indalecio Prieto, they dissolved the anarchists' military training facilities and handed control of most military units to the PCE. The PCE subsequently monopolised control of the specialised branches of the military and oversaw the rapid promotion of their members to senior officer ranks, which allowed them to take command over anarchist units. The Communist colonel Francisco Galán attempted to wrest control of the 26th Division from the CNT, transferring officers who had been trained by Sanz into communist divisions and disciplining its junior officers without Sanz's own sanction. Sanz responded by going to Galán's headquarters and threatening him with a pistol, demanding he cease his harassment of the 26th Division; according to Sanz, Galán never bothered them again afterwards. But Galán continued his efforts with other units, managing to dismiss the anarchist commanders of the 153rd Mixed Brigade.

On 11 August 1937, Negrín ordered the 11th Division to forcibly disband the Regional Defence Council of Aragon and break up many of the anarchist collectives in the region; According to Sanz, the 11th Division arrested the council's workers, attacked and robbed the collectives, and carried out a campaign of political repression against collectivists. The 26th Division and other anarchist units were kept on the front lines while it happened and news of it was suppressed before it reached them. When they heard what had happened, members of the 26th Division from Mas de las Matas attempted to leave the front to resist the communist attacks, but they were restrained by the division's commanders, who hoped for a diplomatic resolution. While this took place, Vicent Rojo began planning a diversionary offensive against Zaragoza to draw the Nationalists away from the War in the North. They planned to break through the nationalist lines at multiple points, with the 26th and 43rd Divisions being directed to attack Pina, cross the Ebro and cut the road between Quinto and Zaragoza. The offensive began on 24 August, and Quinto fell to the Republicans on 26 August. But before they could move on Zaragoza, Juan Modesto abruptly changed the plan and ordered an attack on the small town Belchite. They eventually took the town, despite heavy losses, but it gave time for the Nationalists to reinforce their lines, resulting in the failure of the offensive against Zaragoza.

== Battle of Teruel (December 1937 – February 1938) ==
Following the Nationalist victory in the north, the Republican general staff began to worry that another offensive against Madrid was being prepared. To counter this, in late 1937, the Republican general staff began planning another diversionary offensive against the Aragonese city of Teruel, which had been controlled by the Nationalists since the outbreak of the wawr. The Battle of Teruel began on 15 December 1937 and the Republican offensive was initially successful, surrounding the city and forcing the Nationalist garrison to surrender. But General Francisco Franco brought in reinforcements from the northern front and Madrid, which halted the Republican offensive and subsequently began a counteroffensive. The anarchist 25th, 26th and 28th Divisions led the resistance to the Nationalist counteroffensive.

According to Lieutenant Colonel Valentín González, the Communist commander Juan Modesto stripped the anarchist divisions of their artillery, which prevented them from holding out and eventually forced them to fall back. The Republicans finally withdrew from the city on 22 February 1938 Lieutenant Colonel Valentín González alleged that the Communist Party had deliberately sacrificed the anarchists during the withdrawal from the city, in order to discredit the anarchist movement and force the ousting of the socialist Indalecio Prieto as Minister of Defence. In his own analysis of the battle, the 26th Division's commander Ricardo Sanz said that insufficient materiel had been the principal cause for the Republican defeat; he proposed that, if they had received the sufficient resources, they could have continued their offensive and broken the Nationalist lines in Aragon.

== Aragon Offensive (March–April 1938) ==
Following the Republican defeat in Teruel, in March 1938, the Nationalists began their Aragon Offensive, which the anarchist divisions attempted to resist. The 26th Division, which had been on the Aragon front since the beginning of the war, noticed a build-up of Nationalist troops in Zaragoza and attempted to warn the Republican military command. To the south of the 26th Division, the XI International Brigade and the 44th Division were overwhelmed by the Nationalist advance, leaving the 26th Division to fill the gap and rally the remaining troops. Before long, the 26th Division was holding a 170 kilometre long front line; ten times the size of what was normally expected of a single division. The CNT responded by calling up volunteers from an older generation of reservists, who were enrolled directly into the 26th Division. 500 men from Calanda, a collectivised town of only 4,500 people, also volunteered to join the 26th Division and help resist the offensive.

Following breakthroughs to the north of their positions, and following days of fighting without relief, the 26th Division was facing a Nationalist encirclement. Sanz asked Generals Sebastián Pozas and Vicent Rojo for orders, but no explicit orders were given and the chain of command broke down. Without orders from his own commanders, Sanz himself decided to order a retreat. Soviet Marshal Rodion Malinovsky later claimed that the anarchists withdrew without resistance. As the 26th Division fell back, they appeared to receive reinforcements from the Carabineros, but the latter quickly turned around without engaging the enemy. The 26th Division fell back to the river Segre, where it established a new front line, flanked by the communists of Valentín González's 46th Division.

== Battle of the Segre (April–December 1938) ==
In the wake of the Aragon Offensive, the Catalan military units were divided into two field armies: the Communist-controlled Army of the Ebro and the predominantly anarchist Army of the East. According to Sanz, the Army of the Ebro received support from the Republican government and press, its officers were given large promotions, and it answered directly to prime minister Juan Negrín, ignoring orders from its own military superiors. In contrast, the Army of the East was largely ignored and its officers were passed over for promotion. The communists attempted to gain influence over the Army of the East, but its commander, Juan Perea, resisted any party political control.

On 31 March 1938, the trade unions of the CNT and General Union of Workers (UGT) initiated a civil mobilisation to construct fortifications for the defense of Catalonia. In July 1938, the Army of the Ebro initiated a counter-offensive, beginning the Battle of the Ebro. Following initial successes, the Republicans were beaten back and the Army of the East was brought in as reinforcements. The Army of the East, including the 26th Division, fought for days without relief; 75% of their men were killed or wounded and 95% of their materiel was lost. In September 1938, Ricardo Sanz was promoted to the rank of lieutenant colonel; he was one of only two anarchists to be promoted to this rank. As the situation in Catalonia deteriorated and supplies ran short, the anarchists of the 26th Division became agitated to see the Carabineros and Assault Guards remained relatively well fed and stayed far away from the front lines.

== Catalonia Offensive (December 1938 – February 1939) ==
When the Nationalists began their Catalonia Offensive, the 26th Division was the first unit to resist, holding the line and initially managing to repel the offensive. Vicent Rojo praised the 26th Division for its "magnificent resistance" against the Maestrazgo Army Corps at Tremp. The Nationalists then shifted their focus to attacking the part of the front held by the Army of the Ebro, which quickly collapsed, leading to a rapid Nationalist advance. No defence of the Catalan capital of Barcelona had been prepared, with Sanz arguing that the population believed they would be saved by some "miracle". The Army of the Ebro quickly fled the unfortified city towards the France-Spain border, while the Catalan government retreated to Figueres. In discussions about a last stand, the Iberian Anarchist Federation (FAI) discussed the possibility of a scorched-earth policy, but ultimately rejected it, worrying that it would leave those who stayed behind in poverty. On 25 January 1939, General José Asensio contacted the FAI to discuss resistance, but he was unable to gain sanction from the government and their incoming weapons shipments were derailed; no resistance to the city's capture materialised.

The 26th Division continued fighting for 16 days after the fall of Barcelona, substantially slowing the pace of the Nationalist advance, before they were finally relieved by the 31st Division. By this time, the military chain of command had collapsed and the government had fled to France. In the north of Catalonia, the 26th Division set up a final line of defense, allowing hundreds of thousands of refugees to escape over the border. On 10 February 1939, the commanders of the 10th Army Corps gave orders for its troops to withdraw to France and the 26th Division crossed over the border.

The survivors of the 26th Division were interned in Camp Vernet, which fell under Nazi control after the Battle of France in 1940. Sanz was deported to French North Africa by the Vichy government and returned to France after the Liberation of France. He remained in exile in France until the Spanish transition to democracy and returned to Spain in 1979. He wrote a memoir of his time in the 26th Division, Los que fuimos a Madrid (English: We who went to Madrid).

== Command structure ==
- Commander-in-chief
  - Ricardo Sanz
- Political commissar
  - Ricardo Rionda (CNT)
- Assistant commissar
  - Ángel Flores
- Chief of staff
  - Ramón Rodríguez Bosmediano

== See also ==
- La Nueve
- Argelers concentration camp

== Bibliography ==
- Alexander, Robert J. (1999). The Anarchists in the Spanish Civil War. London: Janus Publishing Company. ISBN 978-1-85756-400-6.
- Alpert, Michael (2013). The Republican Army in the Spanish Civil War, 1936–1939. Cambridge University Press. ISBN 978-1-107-02873-9.
- Beevor, Antony (2006) [1982]. The Battle for Spain: The Spanish Civil War 1936–1939. London: Weidenfeld & Nicolson. ISBN 0-2978-4832-1.
- Bolloten, Burnet (1991). The Spanish Civil War: Revolution and Counterrevolution. University of North Carolina Press. ISBN 0-8078-1906-9. LCCN 89-77911.
- Fraser, Ronald (1979). Blood of Spain: The Experience of Civil War, 1936-1939. Penguin Books. ISBN 0-7139-1085-2.
- Thomas, Hugh (2001) [1961]. The Spanish Civil War (4th ed.). New York: Modern Library. ISBN 0-375-75515-2.
