= 32nd Division (Spain) =

- 32.ª División
- Active: June 1937–February 1939
- Country: Spanish Republic
- Allegiance: Republican faction
- Branch: Spanish Republican Army
- Type: Infantry
- Size: Division
- Engagements: Spanish Civil War: Aragon Offensive; Battle of the Segre; Catalonia Offensive

Commanders
- Notable commanders: Manuel Gancedo Sáenz

The 32nd Division was one of the divisions of the Spanish Republican Army that were organized during the Spanish Civil War on the basis of the Mixed Brigades. It was deployed on the Aragon and Segre fronts.

== History ==
The unit was created on April 28, 1937, as a reserve division of the Eastern Army. Subsequently, the 32nd Division was integrated into the XI Army Corps, being placed in the rear. Command of the unit fell to Alfonso Arana Vivanco, who was replaced in July 1937 by Manuel Gancedo Sáenz.

During the Aragon Offensive, the 32nd Division was forced to withdraw, establishing its new defensive positions on the Segre front . On September 8, 1938, the forces of the unit relieved the 55th Division in the Agramunt-Artesa de Segre-Tornabous sector. After the start of the Catalonia Offensive the 32nd Division, faced with strong enemy pressure, was forced to withdraw. In the course of the fighting, it suffered a severe loss. In January 1939 it was briefly added to the X Army Corps, although during the rest of the campaign it did not play a relevant role and ended up withdrawing to the French border.

== Command ==
Commanders

- Alfonso Arana Vivanco;
- Manuel Gancedo Sáenz;

Commissars

- Cristóbal Albadetrecu, of the CNT;
- Francisco Señer Martín, of the CNT;
- Andrés Semitiel Rubio, of the PSOE;

Chiefs of Staff

- Emilio Bosch Montes;
- Felipe Félix Moreno Gómez;

== Order of battle ==
Date	Attached Army Corps	Integrated Mixed Brigades	Battle front
June 1937	Eastern Army Reserves	137th, 140th and 141st	Aragon
February 1938	XI Army Corps	137th, 141st and 142nd	Aragon
January 2, 1939	X Army Corps	137th and 142nd	Segre

== Bibliography ==
- Alpert, Michael (2013). The Republican Army in the Spanish Civil War, 1936–1939. Cambridge University Press.
- Álvarez, Santiago (1989). Los comisarios políticos en el Ejército Popular de la República (in Spanish). Ediciós do Castro.
- Engel, Carlos (1999). Historia de las Brigadas Mixtas del Ejército Popular de la República (in Spanish). Madrid: Almena. ISBN 84-922644-7-0.
- Maldonado, José M.ª (2007). El frente de Aragón. La Guerra Civil en Aragón (1936–1938) (in Spanish). Mira Editores. ISBN 978-84-8465-237-3.
- Salas Larrazábal, Ramón (2006). Historia del Ejército Popular de la República (in Spanish). La Esfera de los Libros. ISBN 84-9734-465-0.
- Zaragoza, Cristóbal (1983). Ejército Popular y Militares de la República, 1936-1939 (in Spanish). Barcelona: Ed. Planeta.
