= Eastern Army (Spain) =

- Ejército del Este
- Active: May 1937-February 1939
- Country: Spain
- Allegiance: (Spain) Spanish Republic
- Branch: Spanish Republican Army
- Size: Field army
- Engagements: Spanish Civil War

Commanders
- Notable commanders: Sebastián Pozas; Juan Perea Capulino

The Eastern Army (Spanish: Ejército del Este), also translated as the Army of the East, was a unit of the Spanish Republican Army that operated in the eastern part of Spain during the Spanish Civil War. Republican forces deployed on the Aragon front of the war initially came under the command structure of the unit. Later in the Civil War, the unit operated in Catalonia, defending the Republican defensive line along the Segre river.

== History ==
After the breakout of the 1936 civil war in Spain, the Catalan government looked to create its own army, independent of the organic structures of the Republican army which operated in the rest of the Republican territory. On 6 December 1936, the Catalan Ministry of Defence declared the creation of the People's Army of Catalonia. However, this army existed far more on paper than it did in reality, as the anarchist militias continued to have a great degree of autonomy, and in many cases did not become part of the new army. After the May Days battles in Barcelona, the Republican government recovered its competencies in the area of defence, and General Sebastián Pozas assumed command of military forces in Catalonia. The army of Catalonia was dissolved, and its units were integrated into the main Republican army. These units formed the newly created Ejército del Este, which went on to man the Aragon front. The previous militias were forcefully conscripted into the Republican army.

The decree that created the Eastern Army also establishes three new army corps — the 10th, 11th and 12th — into which the militias were integrated. The colonel Vicente Guarner Vivancos was named the Chief of Staff of the Eastern Army.

Over the course of the summer of 1937, the new army launched various offensives on the Aragon Front, with the primary objective of distracting enemy troops who had been attacking the Republican forces in Madrid and the Northern Front. In June, the unit launched the offensive for Huesca, which ended in failure. At the end of August it started an offensive of even greater calibre, this time directed against Zaragoza, which also ended in failure, although the main focus of Republican operations at the time was in Belchite. Following these failures, two new offensives were launched in Autumn: one more attempt against Zaragoza, and the Biescas Offensive, in the Huescan comarca of Alto Gállego.

In March 1938 Franco's army launched a strong offensive against the republican lines on the Aragon Front. In just a few weeks the Eastern Army was practically destroyed by the attacking "nacionales", additionally losing a great amount of territory. As a consequence, General Pozas was removed from his post, and in his place the colonel Juan Perea Capulino was installed.

During April 1938, the Segre River became the new defensive line for the Eastern Army. In May, the unit participated in the Balaguer Offensive, which among various objectives looked to test the capacity of the new forces that the unit had. However, the offensive did not end in the success that was hoped for, so the unit recentred itself around its defensive duties. Over the course of June, the army was integrated within the Eastern Region Army Group, under the leadership of Juan Hernández Saravia. Towards the end of 1938, during the first few days of the Catalonia Offensive, the Eastern Army maintained a bitter resistance against the advancing enemy. However, after suffering great losses, the forces began moving towards the North. The Eastern Army was later dissolved when, at the start of February 1939, its units crossed the French border.

== Order of Battle ==
December 1937

Army Corps	Divisions	Sectors
X Army Corps	31st & 43th	Pyrenees – Huesca
XI Army Corps	26th, 29th & 32nd	Zaragoza - Ebro
XII Army Corps	24th, 30th & 44th	Alfambra - Teruel

July 1938

Army Corps	Divisions	Sectors
X Army Corps	30th, 31st & 34th	Balaguer – Segre River
XI Army Corps	26th, 55th & 32nd	Noguera Pallaresa
XVIII Army Corps	27th, 60th & 72nd	Military reserve force

== Leadership and command ==
Commanders

- General Sebastián Pozas Perea (May 1937 - March 1938),
- Colonel Juan Perea Capulino (April 1938 - Feb. 1939).

Jefe de Estado Mayor (Chiefs of Staff)

- Lieutenant colonel Vicente Guarner Vivancos;
- Lieutenant colonel Javier Linares Aranzabe;
- Colonel Aniceto Carvajal Sobrino;

Political Commissars

- Crescenciano Bilbao, of the PSOE;
- Eduardo Castillo Blasco, of PSOE;
- José Ignacio Mantecón, of the Republican Left

Commander General of Engineers

- Colonel of engineers Ramón Martorell Otzet;

== See also ==
- Spanish Republican Army
- Battle of the Segre
- Aragon Front
