= Zaragoza Offensive =

Battle during Spanish Civil war

- Part of the Spanish Civil War
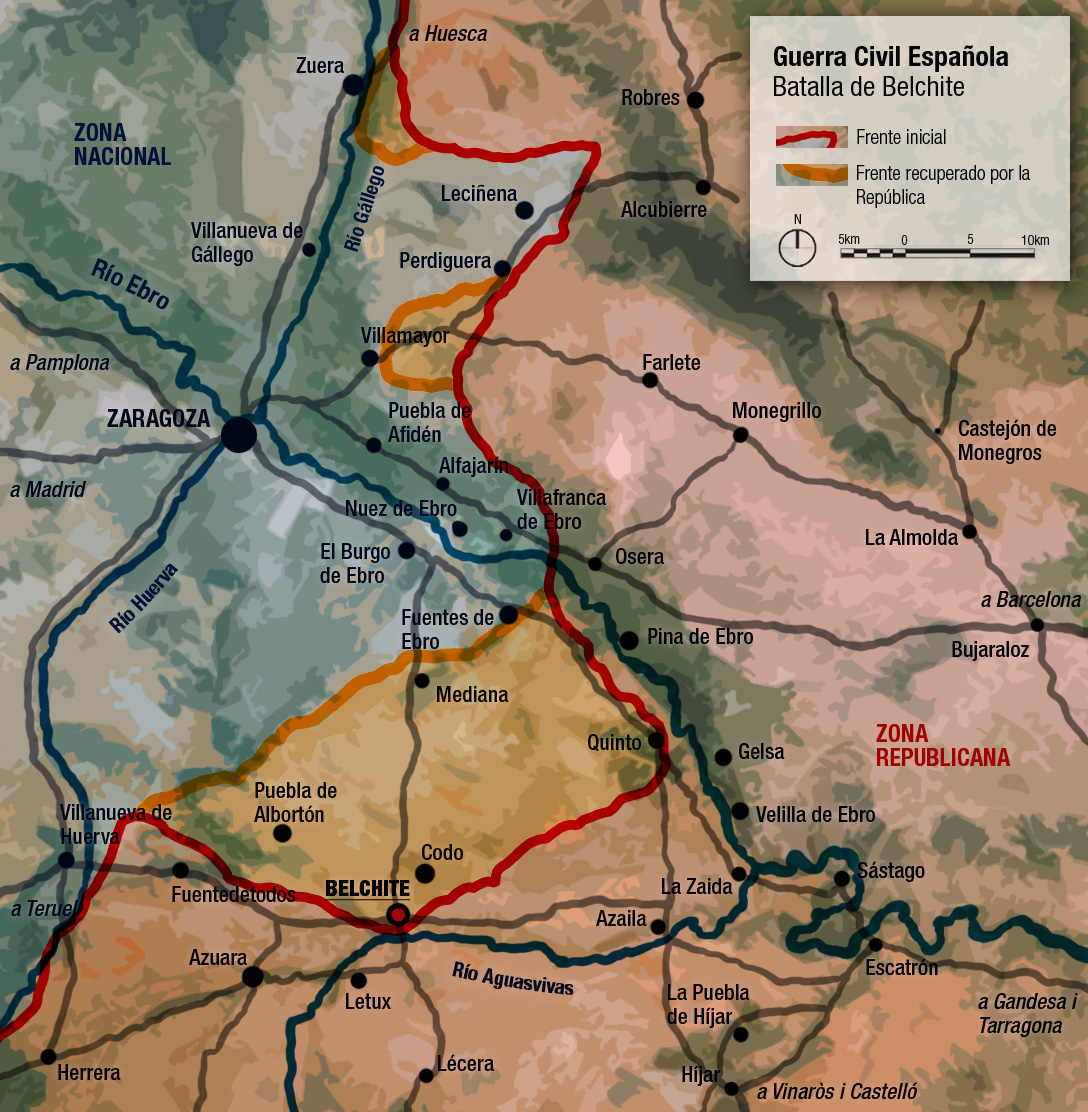
- Spanish map of the Battle of Belchite (2013)
Date	24 August 1937 – 7 September 1937
Location	near Zaragoza, Spain
Result	Nationalist victory

Belligerents
Spanish Republic	Nationalist Spain

Commanders and leaders
(Second Spanish Republic) Sebastian Pozas (Second Spanish Republic) Juan Modesto (Second Spanish Republic) Enrique Líster	(Francoist Spain) Eduardo Sáenz de Buruaga (Francoist Spain) Alfonso Trallero †

Strength
80,000 infantry 105 tanks 90 aircraft Beevor: six divisions 200 aircraft	50,000-100,000 infantry Beevor: three divisions reinforcements: two divisions

Casualties and losses
Unknown	Unknown

The Zaragoza Offensive took place during the Spanish Civil War in 1937. This battle involved the Spanish Republican Army. The main goal of the offensive was to occupy the city of Zaragoza. The main action of the offensive was the battle of Belchite.

== Background ==
In August 1937, the commander in chief of the Republican Army, Vicente Rojo, decided to launch an offensive in the Aragon front in order to take the regional capital, Saragossa. The main goal of the offensive was to stop the Nationalist offensive against Santander. Furthermore, Saragossa was the communications centre of the whole Aragon front.

== Opposing forces ==
In the Aragon front the Republican Army had deployed the Army of the East, led by the general Pozas and his chief of staff Antonio Cordon. This army had six divisions (Lister's 11th Division, 26th Division, 27th Division, Walter's 35th Division, 43rd Division; and Kleber's 45th Division). Furthermore, the Republicans had 200 aircraft and many T-26 and BT-5 tanks.

Opposing them, the Nationalists had three low-quality divisions (51st, 52nd and 105th divisions), and 15 aircraft (obsolete Heinkel He-46 light bombers and He-51 fighters).

== The offensive ==
The Republican plan was to break through at seven different points between Zuera and Belchite in order to divide any Nationalist counter-attack. The 27th Division would occupy Zuera, turn left and attack Zaragoza. Kléber's 45h Division would attack south-eastwards towards Saragossa and the 43rd Division would cross the Ebro and cut the highway from Quinto to Saragossa. But the main attack was concentrated up the south side of the Ebro Valley, with Modesto's V Corps (11th Division and 35th Division).

The Republican attack began on 24 August with no artillery bombardment in order to maintain the advantage of surprise. The 27th Division occupied Zuera, the 45th Division reached Villamajor de Gállego (six kilometres from Saragossa) and the 25th Division took Codó, despite fierce Nationalist resistance. Nevertheless, Lister's 11th Division failed to occupy Fuentes de Ebro and almost all its BT-5 tanks were destroyed.

=== Fuentes de Ebro ===
Lister had to take the fortified town of Fuentes de Ebro in order to open the road to Zaragoza. Forty-eight BT-5 tanks carrying Spanish troops would cross the Republican lines and attack the town from the front, supporting by the troops of the XV International Brigade. Nevertheless, the attack was ill-planned. The tanks were not suited to carrying troops, very little reconnaissance was carried out, there was virtually no artillery preparation and the tanks became bogged down in the mud. The attack failed and the republican army lost 19 of its 48 tanks and more than 300 men (according to Hugh Thomas 12 tanks destroyed out of 40) An American member of the International Brigades said:

Courage and heroism are plentiful in Spain and the Spanish people have no lack of it. What they need is tactics. And as for tactics, on 13 October, Regiment BT was bankrupt.

=== Belchite ===
On 26 August, the 25th Division took Quinto, but the delays in the Republicans' advance had given the Nationalists time to bring up reinforcements (Barron's 13th Division and Saenz de Buruaga's 150th Division and 80 aircraft from the Madrid front) and the attack on Zaragoza failed.

Modesto then decided to capture the small (3,800 inhabitants) and well fortified town of Belchite. The Republican army cut the water supply of the town and the heat was appalling, but the defence of the besieged forces was vigorous. The attack on Belchite started on 1 September and, after five days of heavy bombardment and bloody combat, the Republicans managed to occupy it. The offensive ended on 6 September.

== Aftermath ==
The offensive was a complete failure. The Nationalists did not stop their offensive against the Northern Republican held zone. The Republicans only advanced ten kilometres and took a handful of small towns. Furthermore, the Republican Army suffered heavy losses of armament and tanks. Indalecio Prieto said: "So many troops to take four or five pueblos does not satisfy the ministry of defence". The offensive failed because the republican forces lacked coordination, supplies and military intelligence. Furthermore, the Republican commanders wasted troops in order to reduce small resistance points.

== See also ==
- List of Spanish Republican military equipment of the Spanish Civil War
- List of Spanish Nationalist military equipment of the Spanish Civil War

== Bibliography ==
- Beevor, Antony (2006), The Battle for Spain: The Spanish Civil War, 1936-1939, Phoenix, ISBN 0-7538-2280-6
- Thomas, Hugh (2003). The Spanish Civil War. Penguin Books. ISBN 0141011610.
