= Battle of Sabiñánigo =

Spanish Civil War conflict

- Part of the Spanish Civil War
Date	22 September – 8 November 1937
Location	Sabiñánigo, Spain
Result	Republican victory
Territorial changes	Republican forces take Biescas but fail to take Sabiñánigo

Belligerents
Second Spanish Republic	Nationalist Spain

Commanders and leaders
Mariano Bueno	Unknown

Units involved
27th Division; 43rd Division	50th Division

Strength
14,000 men 16 artillery units	10,000 men

Casualties and losses
~2,500 killed	~3,500 killed

The Battle of Sabiñánigo took place during the Spanish Civil War near Alto Gállego and the town of Sabiñánigo in 1937 as part of the Aragon front.

As part of the Republican strategy, the 43rd and 27th divisions moved to the north, amounting to about 14,000 men and 16 pieces of artillery under the command of Mariano Bueno. They eventually faced about 10,000 Nationalist troops, based around the 1st Brigade of the 50th National Division. The attack started on 22 September and fighting continued until 8 November, with perhaps about 2,500 Republican casualties within the 42rd Division and 3,500 Nationalist casualties.

The Republican forces managed to take Biescas, but failed to take Sabiñánigo despite encircling it, or gain complete control of the territory before both sides were exhausted.
