= Battle of the Segre =

Coordinates: 41°37′0″N 1°0′1″E

- Part of the Spanish Civil War
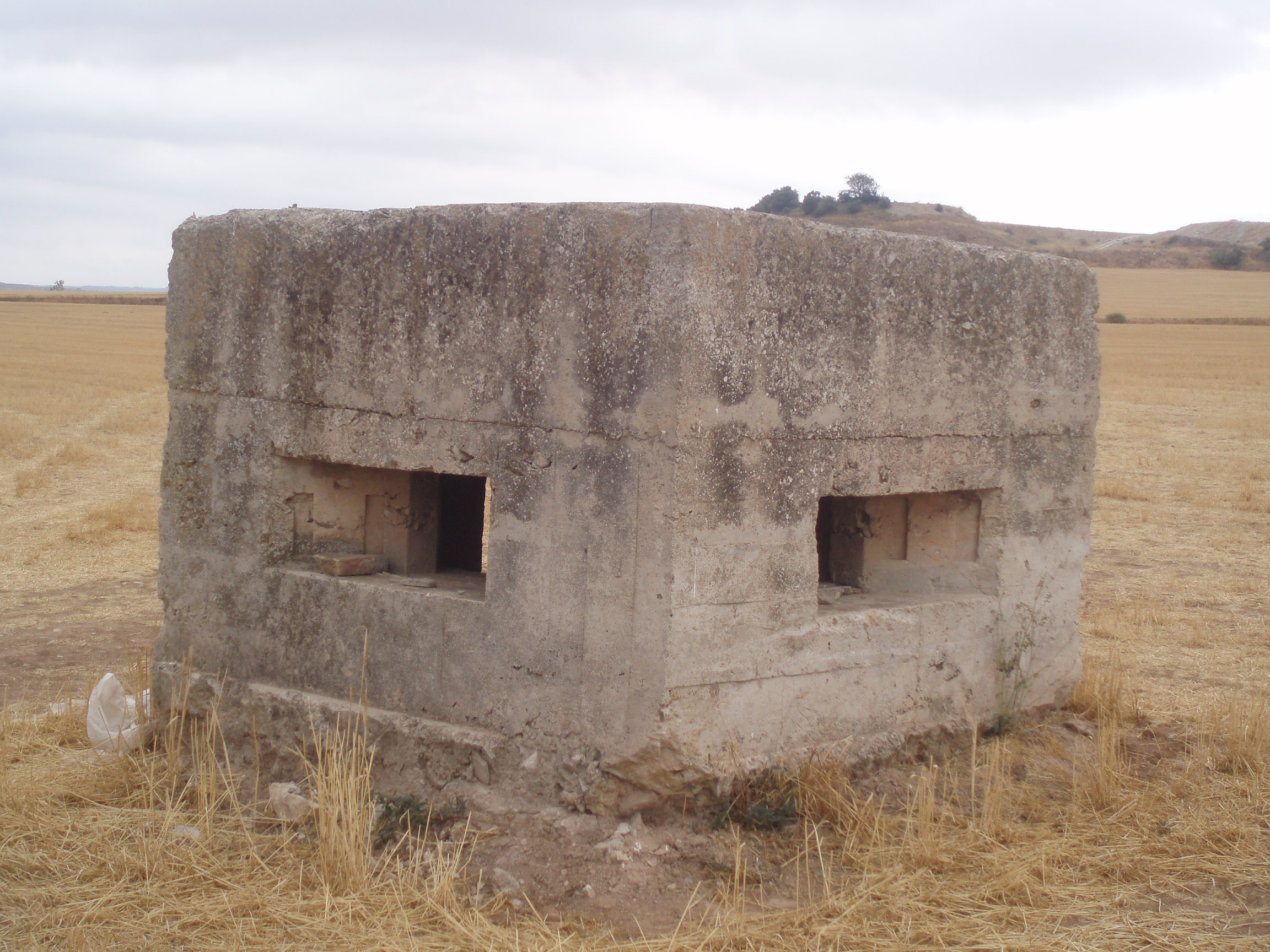
- Bunker at Bellpuig, Urgell
Date	4 April 1938 – 3 January 1939
Location	Near the Segre and Noguera Pallaresa River banks, Catalonia
Result	Nationalist victory

Belligerents
Spanish Republic	Nationalist Spain

Commanders and leaders
Hernández Saravia; Juan Perea; Francisco Galán; Gregorio Jover; Enrique Líster	Fidel Dávila Arrondo; José Solchaga; José Moscardó; Agustín Muñoz Grandes

Strength
Levantine Army c. 18,000 troops	Northern Army c. 1,800 troops

Casualties and losses
High	High

The Battle of the Segre is the collective name of a series of battles that took place along the Segre River between 4 April 1938 and 3 January 1939 during the Spanish Civil War, after the Nationalist Faction had broken the lines of the Spanish Republican Army in the Aragon Offensive.

Although seldom mentioned in historical works, it was one of the most protracted battles of the Civil War.

== History ==
After having been overwhelmed in Aragon, the Segre River became for the Spanish Republic a crucial line not only for halting the devastating eastward advance of the rebel armies, but also to ensure that the vital hydroelectric dams of the Pre-Pyrenees did not fall in Francoist hands.

Beginning in April there were constant battles in the Segre Front along a long defensive line of republican positions and fortifications. During most of 1938 there would be numerous attacks, counterattacks and skirmishes from both sides along the Segre River. A great number of manpower and material was sent to the Eastern Army of the newly created Eastern Region Army Group in that front. The Spanish republic was able to hold unto that line until the beginning of January 1939 when it became impossible to keep holding the resistance in the Segre against the overwhelming pressure of the rebels.

Photographer Robert Capa took pictures of the Spanish Republican Navy Marines of the 151 Brigada Mixta who fought in this battle.

== See also ==
- Balaguer Offensive
- List of Spanish Nationalist military equipment of the Spanish Civil War
- List of Spanish Republican military equipment of the Spanish Civil War
