= Santiago Álvarez Gómez =

Santiago Álvarez Gómez (1913–2002) was a Spanish communist and founder of the Communist Party of Galicia. He had been a member of the Communist Party of Spain (PCE) and one of the commissars of the 1st Mixed Brigade of the Spanish Republican Army in the Spanish Civil War.
