= Catalonia Offensive =

1938–1939 campaign in the Spanish Civil War

- Part of the Spanish Civil War
- Map of Spain in November 1938, right after the end of the Battle of the Ebro and immediately before the start of the Catalonia Offensive. Territory still controlled by the Republic is depicted in pink
Date	23 December 1938 – 10 February 1939
Location	Northeastern Spain
Result	Nationalist victory

Belligerents
(Second Spanish Republic) Republicans: Generalitat of Catalonia	(Francoist Spain) Nationalists; (Fascist Italy) CTV; (Nazi Germany) Condor Legion

Commanders and leaders
(Second Spanish Republic) Hernández Saravia; (Second Spanish Republic) Enrique Jurado; (Second Spanish Republic) Vicente Rojo Lluch; (Second Spanish Republic) Juan Perea Capulino; (Second Spanish Republic) Juan Guilloto León; (Second Spanish Republic) Enrique Líster	(Spain) Francisco Franco; (Spain) Fidel Dávila Arrondo; (Spain) Juan Yagüe; (Spain) Rafael García Valiño; (Francoist Spain) José Moscardó Ituarte; (Fascist Italy) Gastone Gambara

Strength
Thomas: 300,000; Beevor: 220,000; Jackson: 90,000; Thomas: 360 artillery pieces Beevor: 250 artillery pieces Thomas: 200 tanks and armoured cars Beevor: 40 tanks and armoured cars Thomas: 80 aircraft Beevor: 106 aircraft	Jackson: 350,000; Beevor: 340,000; Thomas: 300,000; Beevor: 1,400 artillery pieces Thomas: 565 artillery pieces 300 tanks 500 aircraft

Casualties and losses
Unknown dead 10,000 wounded 60,000 captured 220,000 disarmed in France	Unknown

The Catalonia Offensive (Catalan: Ofensiva de Catalunya, Spanish: Ofensiva de Cataluña) was part of the Spanish Civil War. The Nationalist Army started the offensive on 23 December 1938 and rapidly conquered Republican-held Catalonia with Barcelona (the Republic's capital city from October 1937). Barcelona was captured on 26 January 1939. The Republican and Catalan governments headed for the French border. Thousands of people fleeing the Nationalists also crossed the frontier in the following month, to be placed in internment camps. Franco closed the border with France by 10 February 1939.

== Background ==
After its defeat at the Battle of the Ebro the Republican Army was broken and would never recover. The Republicans had lost most of their armament and experienced units. Furthermore, in October 1938 the Republican government agreed to withdraw the volunteers of the International Brigades. On the other hand, the Nationalists received new supplies of ammunition, weapons and aircraft from Germany. Furthermore, after the Munich Agreement, the hope of an intervention of the Western democracies in order to aid the Republic against Germany and Italy vanished. France had closed the frontier again in mid-June 1938 and frozen Republican financial assets in French banks.

== Opposing forces ==
=== Nationalists ===
At the beginning of December, the nationalist faction concentrated an Army Group, the Army of the North, of 300,000–340,000 men led by the general Fidel Dávila in order to conquer Catalonia. The Nationalists assembled their best divisions all along the front from the Pyrenees to the Mediterranean. Along the Segre the Nationalists deployed Muñoz Grandes's Army of Urgel, Garcia Valiño's Army of Maestrazgo and Moscardo's Aragon Army; in the confluence of the Segre with the Ebro Gambara's Italian Cuerpo Legionario Italiano of four divisions (55,000 men) and Solchaga's Army Corps of Navarra; and in the Ebro the Yagüe's Moroccan Corps. The Nationalists also had, according to Beevor, 300 tanks, more than 500 aircraft (among them the Bf 109E and Heinkel 112 fighters) and 1,400 cannon.

=== Republicans ===
Opposing the Nationalists, the Republicans had Colonel Perea Capulino's Eastern Army and Colonel Juan Modesto's Ebro Army, united under the command of General Juan Hernandez Saravia, commander of the Eastern Region Army Group, with 220,000–300,000 men, many unarmed (Hernandez Saravia said that the Republican army had only 17,000 rifles for all Catalonia), 106 airplanes (most of them Chatos), 250 cannons and 40 tanks (many of them unserviceable due to shortage of spare parts).
The Soviet government agreed to send to Catalonia a shipment of 250 aircraft, 250 tanks and 650 cannons, but the shipment did not reach Bordeaux until 15 January and only a small part of it crossed the border. Furthermore, because of the international isolation of the Republic and the lack of food (according to Beevor, in Barcelona the ration per day was down to 100 grams of lentils) the morale of the government troops and civil population in the Republican zone was very low. The people only wished the end of the war: "...just let it be over, it doesn't matter how it ends, but let it end now."

== Battle ==
=== Nationalist offensive ===
The Nationalist offensive was planned for 10 December but was postponed to 23 December. On 23 December the Italians and the Navarreses crossed the Segre at Mequinenza, broke the Republican lines, and advanced sixteen kilometres, but they were stopped by the V and XV Republican corps led by Lister on 25 December. On the left flank, Muñoz Grandes and Garcia Valiño advanced towards Cervera and Artesa, but they were blocked by the 26th Republican Division. On the south, Yagüe's troops were held back by the Ebro's floodwater. The Republicans had stopped the first Nationalist attack; nevertheless, they had lost 40 aircraft in the first ten days of the battle.

On 3 January Solchaga attacked Les Borges Blanques, Muñoz Grandes and Garcia Valiño occupied Artesa, and Yagüe crossed the Ebro. Moscardo attacked from Lleida and the Italians occupied Les Borges Blanques on 5 January. The same day, the Republican army started a surprise attack in Extremadura towards Peñarroya in order to divert Nationalist forces, but the offensive was halted after a few days and the Nationalist offensive in Catalonia continued. On 9 January the Moscardo's Aragon Army Corps joined Gambara at Mollerusa and broke the northern part of the front. The V and XV Republican Corps collapsed and retreated in disorder. On 15 January the Aragon and Maestrazgo Corps conquered Cervera and the Moroccan Corps after a one-day march of 50 km occupied Tarragona. By this day, the Nationalists had conquered a third of Catalonia, had taken 23,000 prisoners, and had killed 5,000 Republican soldiers.

=== Fall of Barcelona ===
The Republican government then attempted to organize a defense of Barcelona, ordering the general mobilization of all men to forty-five and militarized all the industry. Nevertheless, the successive defensive lines (L1, L2, L3) fell, the Republican forces were outnumbered six to one and the Nationalist air force bombed Barcelona every day (40 times between 21 and 25 January). It became clear that the defense of the city was impossible. On 22 January Solchaga and Yagüe reached the Llobregat only a few miles west of Barcelona, Muñoz Grandes and Garcia Valiño attacked Sabadell and Terrassa, and Gambara advanced to Badalona. The chief of staff of the Republican Army, Rojo told the Republican prime minister Negrín that the front had ceased to exist so the government abandoned Barcelona after releasing most of its prisoners. A large part of the Barcelona population fled from the city as well. On 24 January Garcia Valiño occupied Manresa, and on 25 January the Nationalist vanguard occupied the Tibidabo in the outskirts of Barcelona. The Nationalists finally occupied Barcelona on 26 January and there were five days of looting by the Yagüe's Regulares and extrajudicial killings (paseos).

=== Retreat ===
After the occupation of Barcelona, the Nationalist troops, tired from the long marches, slowed their advance but soon resumed their offensive, pursuing the retreating columns of Republican soldiers and civilians. On 1 February Negrín proposed, in the last meeting of the Cortes in the Figueres Castle, capitulation with the sole condition of respecting the lives of the vanquished and the holding of a plebiscite so the Spanish people could decide the form of government, but Franco did not accept. On 2 February the Nationalists entered Girona, arrived within 50 kilometers of the frontier on 3 February, occupied Figueres on 8 February and Rojo ordered the Republican troops to withdraw to the French frontier. Hundreds of thousands of Republican soldiers, women, children and old men marched to the French frontier on foot and on carts, buses and trucks through bitterly cold sleet and snow. Their retreat was covered by units of the Republican Army, which carried out hit and run attacks and ambushes. The Nationalist air force and the Condor Legion bombed and strafed the roads leading to France. On 28 January the French government announced that civilians could cross the frontier and, on 5 February, the Republican soldiers as well. Between 400,000 and 500,000, Republican refugees crossed the frontier, among them the president of the Republic (Manuel Azaña), the prime minister (Juan Negrín) and the chief of staff of the Republican Army (Vicente Rojo), as well the president of Catalonia (Lluís Companys) and the members of the Catalan government. Negrín returned to Spain on 9 February but Azaña and Rojo refused to return. By 9 February the Nationalists reached the frontier, and on the following day the last units of Modesto's Army of the Ebro crossed into France and the Nationalists sealed the frontier.

== Aftermath ==
=== Military and political consequences ===
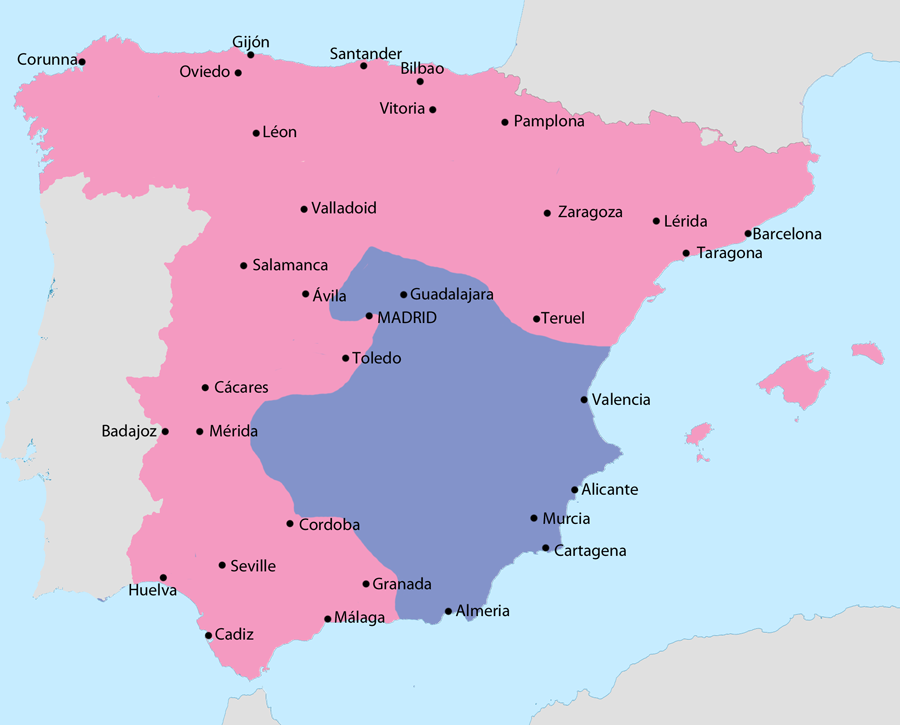
Spain after the conclusion of the Catalonia Offensive. Nationalist Spain is in pink and Republican Spain is in blue.

With the fall of Catalonia, the Republic lost the second largest city of the country, the Catalan war industry and a large part of its army (more than 200,000 soldiers). On 2 February Azaña resigned and on 27 February France and the United Kingdom formally recognized the Francoist government. Further military resistance became impossible and the war was lost for the Republic, despite the fact that 30% of Spain was still under Republican control after the offensive and Prime Minister Juan Negrín insisted that the Republic could continue to resist.

The autonomous region of Catalonia was abolished. The Catalan language, the Sardana and Catalan Christian names were forbidden. All Catalan newspapers were requisitioned and the forbidden books retired and burned. Even the inscriptions on tombs in the Montjuïc Cemetery commemorating Durruti, Ascaso and Ferrer i Guardia were removed.

=== Fate of the Republican refugees ===
The Republican exiles were interned in fifteen improvised camps (mostly barbed-wire enclosures on the sand, without basic shelter, sanitary or cooking facilities) by the French government in places such as Argelès, Gurs, Rivesaltes and Vernet. The living conditions in the camps were very harsh: in the first six months, 14,672 refugees died from malnutrition or dysentery. The French government encouraged the refugees to return and, by the end of 1939, between 70,000 and 180,000 refugees returned to Spain. However, 300,000 never returned. Many sought asylum in other countries: the Soviet Union (between 3,000 and 5,000), USA and Canada (about 1,000), Great Britain, Belgium and other European countries (between 3,000 and 5,000) and Latin America (30,000 to Mexico, 10,000 to Argentina, 5,000 to Venezuela, 5,000 to Dominican Republic, 3,500 to Chile, etc.). Nevertheless, at least 140,000 refugees remained in France while 19,000 went to the French colonies of North Africa. After the fall of France 10,000–15,000 refugees were detained by the Nazis and deported to concentration camps. Another 10,000 joined the French Resistance and more than 2,000 joined the Free French Forces.

== See also ==
- Eastern Region Army Group (GERO)
- Camp de concentration d'Argelès-sur-Mer
- List of Spanish Nationalist military equipment of the Spanish Civil War
- List of weapons of the Corpo Truppe Volontarie
- Condor Legion
- Camí de la Retirada

== Sources ==
- Beevor, Antony (2006) [1982]. The Battle for Spain: The Spanish Civil War 1936–1939. London: Weidenfeld & Nicolson. ISBN 0-297-84832-1.
- Graham, Helen (2005). The Spanish Civil War: A very short introduction. New York, NY: Oxford University Press. doi:10.1093/actrade/9780192803771.001.0001. ISBN 978-0-19-280377-1.
- Jackson, Gabriel (1967). The Spanish Republic and the Civil War, 1931–1939. Princeton: Princeton University Press. ISBN 0-691-00757-8. OCLC 185862219.
- Preston, Paul (2002). Doves of War: Four Women of Spain. London: HarperCollins. ISBN 978-0-00-638694-0.
- Preston, Paul (2006). The Spanish Civil War: Reaction, Revolution, and Revenge. New York: WW Norton & Co. ISBN 0-393-32987-9.
- Thomas, Hugh (2001). The Spanish Civil War. Modern Library. ISBN 0-375-75515-2.
