= Aragon Offensive =

Military Campaign during the Spanish Civil War in 1938

- Part of the Spanish Civil War
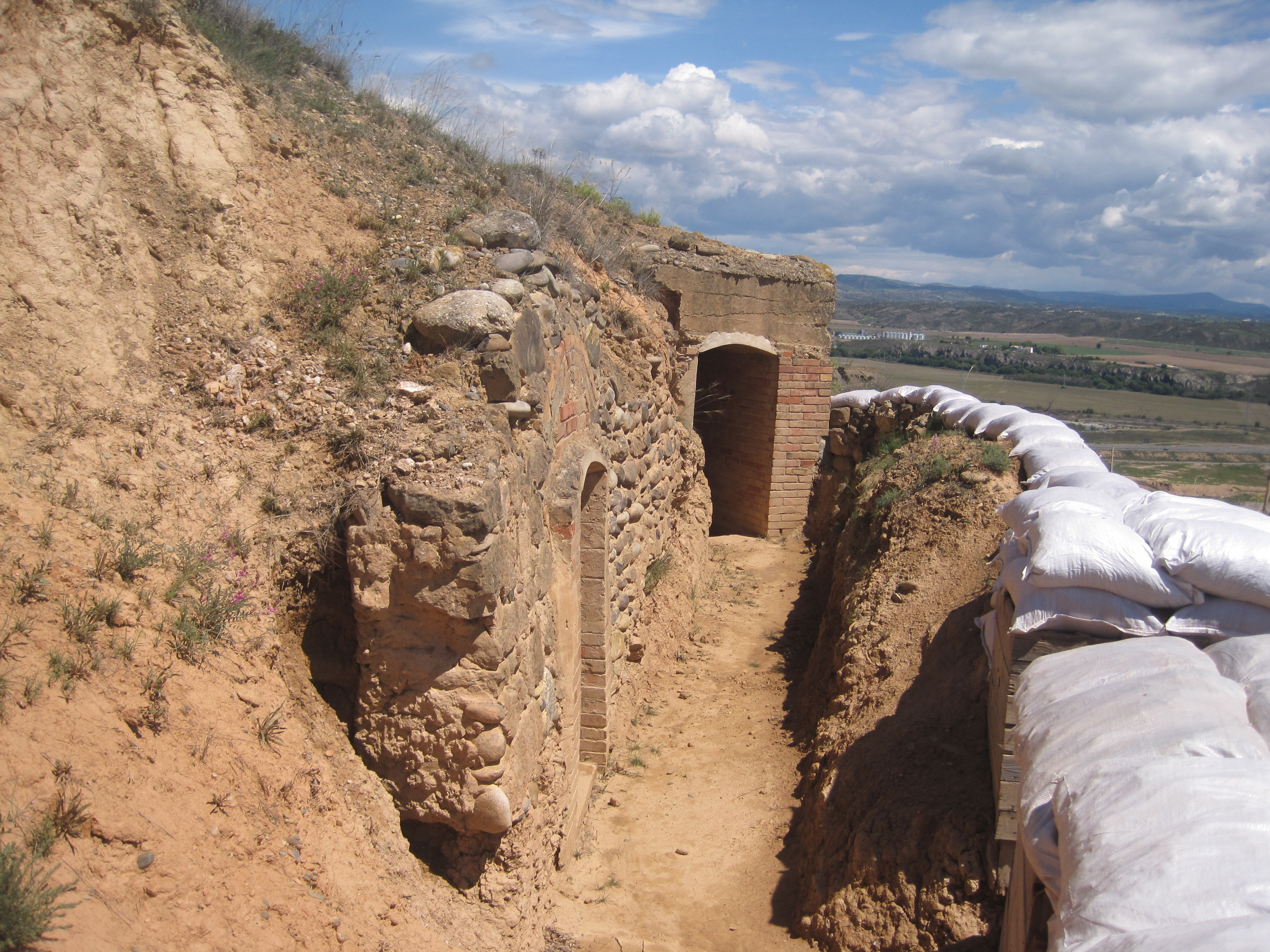
- Trenches of the Civil War in Castejón del Puente, Somontano de Barbastro, Aragón.
| Date | March 7, 1938 – April 19, 1938 |
| Location | Northeastern Spain |
| Result | Nationalist victory |

Belligerents
| Spanish Republic; International Brigades; CNT-FAI | Nationalist Spain; CTV; Condor Legion |

Commanders and leaders
| Vicente Rojo Lluch; Sebastián Pozas; Juan Perea; Enrique Líster; Valentín González; Karol Świerczewski; Robert H. Merriman † | Fidel Dávila Arrondo; Juan Vigón; Juan Yagüe; Rafael García Valiño; José Solchaga; Antonio Aranda; Camilo Alonso Vega; Mario Berti |

Strength
| 100,000 | Beevor: 150,000: 600 airplanes; 700 guns; 150–200 tanks; thousands of trucks; Jackson: 100,000+; 700 italian and 250 german airplanes; Preston: 100,000; 1,000 airplanes; Total: 350,000+; 2,550 airplanes; 700 guns; 150–200 tanks; thousands of trucks |

Casualties and losses
| Very heavy including many captured | Nationalist: moderate; Italian: 731 dead 2,481 wounded 13 missing |

The Aragon Offensive was an important military campaign during the Spanish Civil War, which began after the Battle of Teruel. The offensive, which ran from March 7, 1938, to April 19, 1938, smashed the Republican forces, overran Aragon, and conquered parts of Catalonia and the Levante.

== Introduction ==
The Battle of Teruel exhausted the material resources of the Republican Army, and wore out the veteran Republican troops. A slowdown of supplies from the Soviet Union exacerbated the difficulties of the Republican government, whose armament industry in Catalonia was already beleaguered. At the same time, however, Francisco Franco had concentrated the bulk of the Nationalist forces in the east and was preparing to drive through Aragon and into Catalonia and the Levante. The Nationalists were able to concentrate 100,000 men between Zaragoza and Teruel with the best troops in the lead. Even though the Nationalist army was numerically inferior to the Republican forces, the Nationalists were better equipped and had almost 950 airplanes, 200 tanks and thousands of trucks. In addition to his foreign aid from Nazi Germany and Fascist Italy, Franco by this stage had the advantage of controlling the efficiently run industries in the Basque Country.

== Nationalist army ==
The attacking army was commanded by Fidel Dávila Arrondo, with Juan Vigón Suerodíaz as his second in command. José Solchaga, José Moscardó, Antonio Aranda, and Juan Yagüe would command army corps alongside the Italian General Mario Berti. A reserve commanded by García Escámez and García Valiño constituted the main force. José Enrique Varela with the army of Castile was to stand by, on the wings of the attack, at Teruel. The Condor Legion was also on standby. Colonel Ritter Von Thoma, its commander, convinced Franco to concentrate his tanks rather than spread them out.

== Republican army ==
Because of the material losses at the Battle of Teruel, half the Republican troops lacked even rifles, and since the best troops had been withdrawn to refit, the frontline defenders had no combat experience. The Republic could not replace its lost equipment as Soviet aid was starting to dry up. Essentially, the Republican army was surprised by the Nationalist attack. The Nationalists had redeployed their forces much faster than the Republican general staff thought possible. Although warned by spies, the Republican generals were convinced that the Nationalists would resume the Guadalajara offensive. Another error made by the Republican military leadership was assuming that the Nationalists were as tired and worn out as the Republicans.

== Attack begins ==
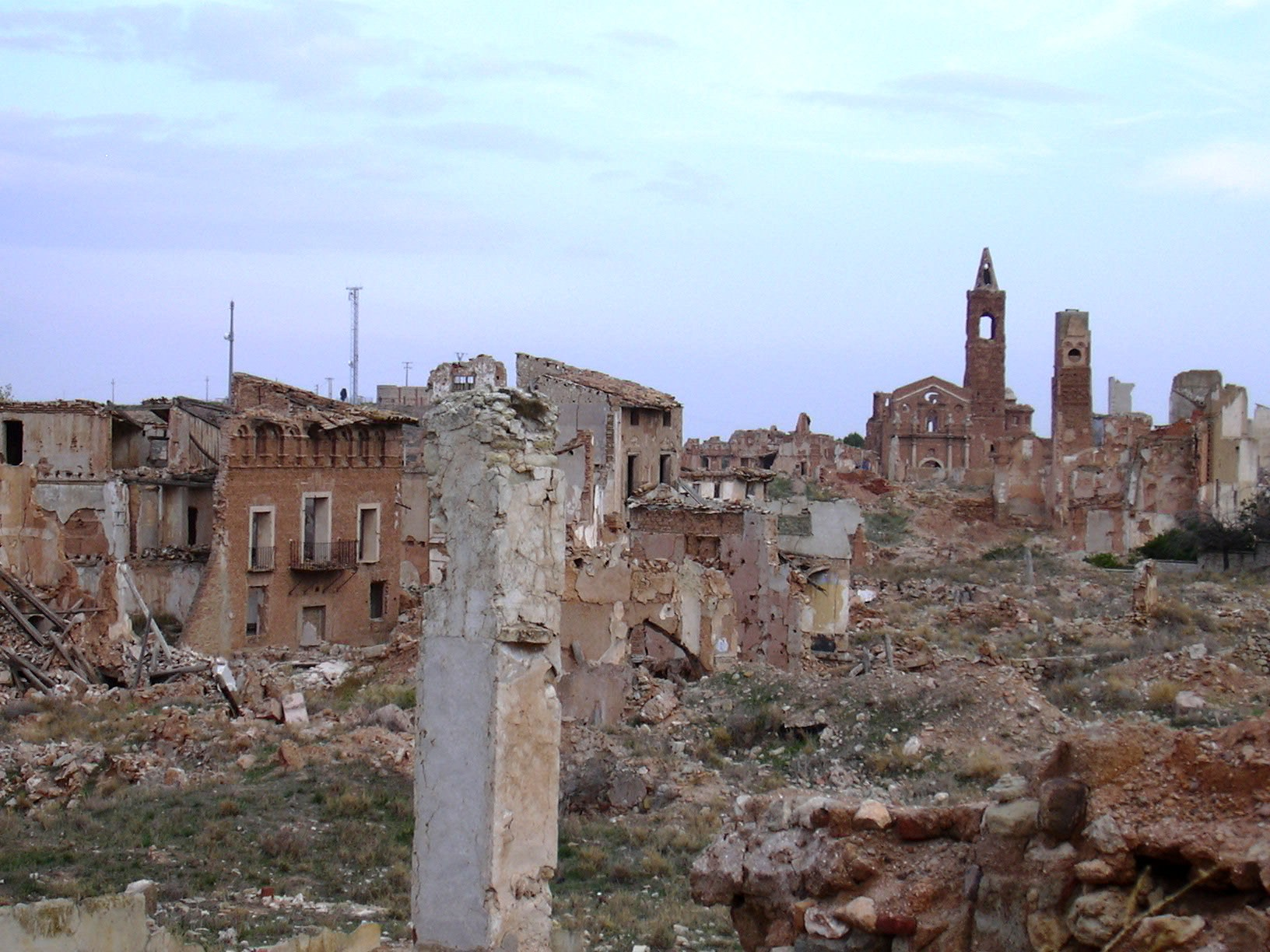
After being destroyed, the village of Belchite was not rebuilt and remained as a monument

The Nationalist attack began on March 7, 1938, preceded by a heavy artillery and aerial bombardment. At 6:30 a.m., three Nationalist armies attacked the Republican line stretched between the Ebro River and Vivel del Río. The northern part of the attack was carried out by Yagüe's elite Army of Africa, supported by the Condor Legion and forty-seven artillery batteries. The Nationalists broke the front in several places on the first day of the battle. Yagüe advanced down the right bank of the Ebro, slashing through all defences. Solchaga won back Belchite on March 10, and the XV International Brigade, with its US, Canadian and British complement, was the last unit out of the destroyed town. The commander of the Abraham Lincoln Battalion, part of the XV International Brigade, Robert Merriman, was killed during the retreat. A Soviet secret policeman had specially designed the fortifications at Belchite, but they fell easily to the advancing Nationalists. The Italians attacked at Rudilla, met some initial resistance and then, led by the Black Arrows (Flechas Negras Division) broke through.

Everywhere the Republican forces were falling back. Many, soldiers and officers, just ran, and the retreat became a rout. In addition, the spreading anti-Communist sentiment in the Republican Army deepened the demoralization. The Communist commanders were accusing each other of various acts of wrongdoing or failure to act. André Marty and Enrique Líster attacked each other. Lister started a policy of shooting commanders of retreating troops. This created discussion among the Communists since Lister was a Communist and the commanders being shot were also Communists.

== Republican disaster ==
Even as Rojo ordered the Republican concentration at Caspe, the Italians were approaching Alcañiz, and the Republican rout became absolute. Even where a Republican unit would fight effectively, it had to fall back because of the collapse of neighboring units. The Italian and German airplanes controlled the skies; their bombers attacked the fleeing Republican units with aerial protection from modern fighters. Karol Świerczewski, known as General Walter, commander of the International Brigades, barely escaped capture at the fall of Alcañiz. Finally, after two days of heavy fighting, Caspe fell on March 17 to Varela's attacking army. The International Brigade performed valiantly in the defense, but was driven off. After eight days, the Nationalists were 70 miles (113 km) east of the positions they had held when the battle started. This first part of the offensive punched a huge hole in the front, created a salient from Belchite to Caspe to Alcañiz and back to Montalbán.

The Nationalist Army now paused before the Ebro and Guadalupe Rivers to reorganize. But on March 22, the attack started again, this time in the area east of Zaragoza and Huesca. This part of the front that the Republic had held since August 1936, was lost in one day. The villages in eastern Aragon that had experienced social revolution, either by their own actions or from the anarchist columns from Catalonia, were all taken by the Nationalists, with many of the inhabitants becoming refugees. In this part of the offensive, Barbastro, Bujaraloz and Sariñena succumbed to the Nationalists. On March 25, Yagüe took Fraga and entered Catalonia. He attacked the next town, Lleida, but El Campesino and his 46th Division (which was also supported by soldiers of the 16th and 27th Divisions) held him off for a week. Despite the 46th Division suffering a 40% casualty rate at Lledia, the battle gave the Republicans a chance to withdraw with valuable equipment. The retreat of the Republican forces was covered by Colonel Durán's Mountain Group in the Maestrazgo, the rugged mountainous area of southern Aragon.

In the north, Republican forces pinned Solchaga down in the Pyrenees, but in the south, the Nationalists drove across the Maestrazgo. Almost everywhere, the Republicans started to fall apart. The various factions started to accuse each other of treachery. The Communists starved anarchist troops of needed munitions. André Marty, the overall commander of the International Brigades, travelled around looking for traitors, but he could not prevent the virtual destruction of the International Brigades. Republican troops suffered arbitrary executions with officers sometimes being shot in front of their men. In general, the campaign seemed lost, and nobody knew where the rout would end.

== End of the campaign ==
The campaign was decided by air power. The plains of Aragon provided easy landing fields allowing rapid air support from close behind the front. Nationalist aircraft continually drove back the Republicans, forcing them to abandon position after position and attacked the retreating columns. Both Germans and Soviets learned valuable lessons in this conflict about the use of aircraft in support of infantry. On the ground, Lleida and Gandesa fell on April. One hundred and forty American and British soldiers from the XV International Brigade became prisoners of the Nationalists. Also on this day, Aranda's troops saw the sea for the first time. In the north, the Nationalist advance continued and by April 8, Barcelona's hydro-electric plants in the Pyrenees fell to the surging Nationalists. Barcelona's industries suffered a severe decline, and the old steam plants were restarted. The Nationalists could easily have taken Catalonia and Barcelona, but Franco made a decision to advance to the coast. This decision turned out to be a strategic mistake, but his intelligence reports suggested that to extend the conflict further into Catalonia might draw French intervention. He directed that the attack continue towards the sea. By April 15 the Nationalists had reached the Mediterranean sea at Vinaròs and by April 19, the Nationalists held 40 miles (64 km) of the Mediterranean coastline. This series of victories that started with Teruel inspired great confidence in the Nationalists that the war was almost won. In the meantime, the French had reopened the border, and military aid that had been purchased and was piling up in France because of the embargo, streamed into Spain and to the Republican forces. This slowed the Nationalists as the Republican defense stiffened. The disaster was contained for the time being, and although the Nationalists pursued other attacks in the north toward the Segre River and in the Valencia area, the Aragon Offensive was for all intents and purposes concluded by April 19. The Nationalist attack was spent and the resistance on the coast was much more formidable.

== See also ==
- List of Spanish Nationalist military equipment of the Spanish Civil War
- List of weapons of the Corpo Truppe Volontarie
- Condor Legion
- List of Spanish Republican military equipment of the Spanish Civil War
