= Segre (river) =

River in France, Andorra and Spain

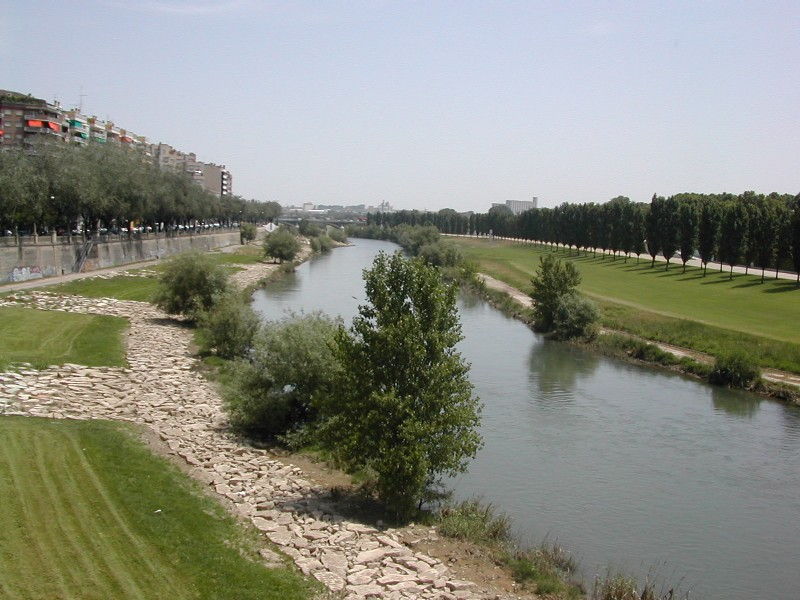
- The Segre in Lleida

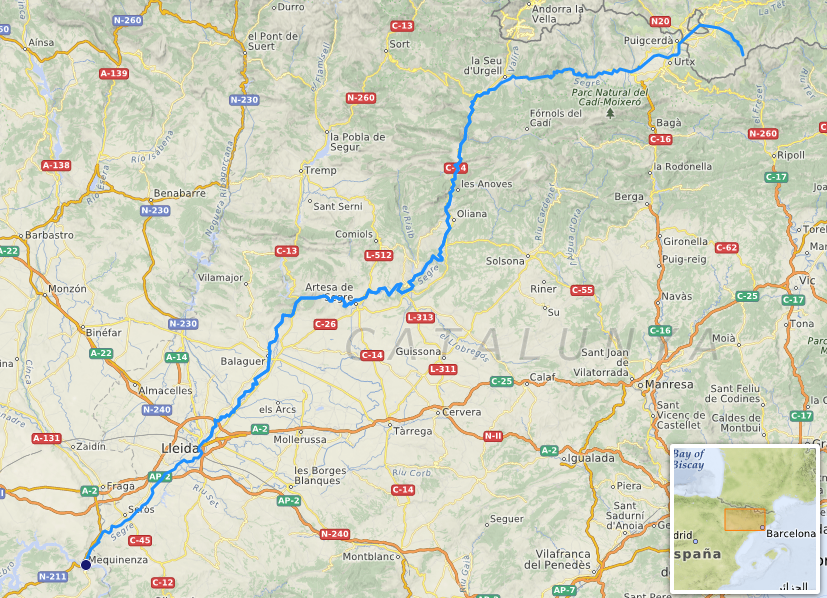
- Path of the Segre

Location
- Countries: Spain; France; Andorra

Physical characteristics
- Source
  - location: Pyrenees
  - coordinates: 42°24′8″N 2°6′31″E
  - elevation: 2,400 m (7,900 ft)
- Mouth
  - location: Ebro
  - coordinates: 41°21′42″N 0°18′15″E
- Length: 265 km (165 mi)

Basin features
- Progression: Ebro→ Balearic Sea

The Segre (Catalan pronunciation: [ˈsɛɣɾə] or [ˈseɣɾe]; French: Sègre) is a river tributary to the Ebro (Ebre in Catalan) with a basin comprising territories across three states: France, Andorra, and Spain.

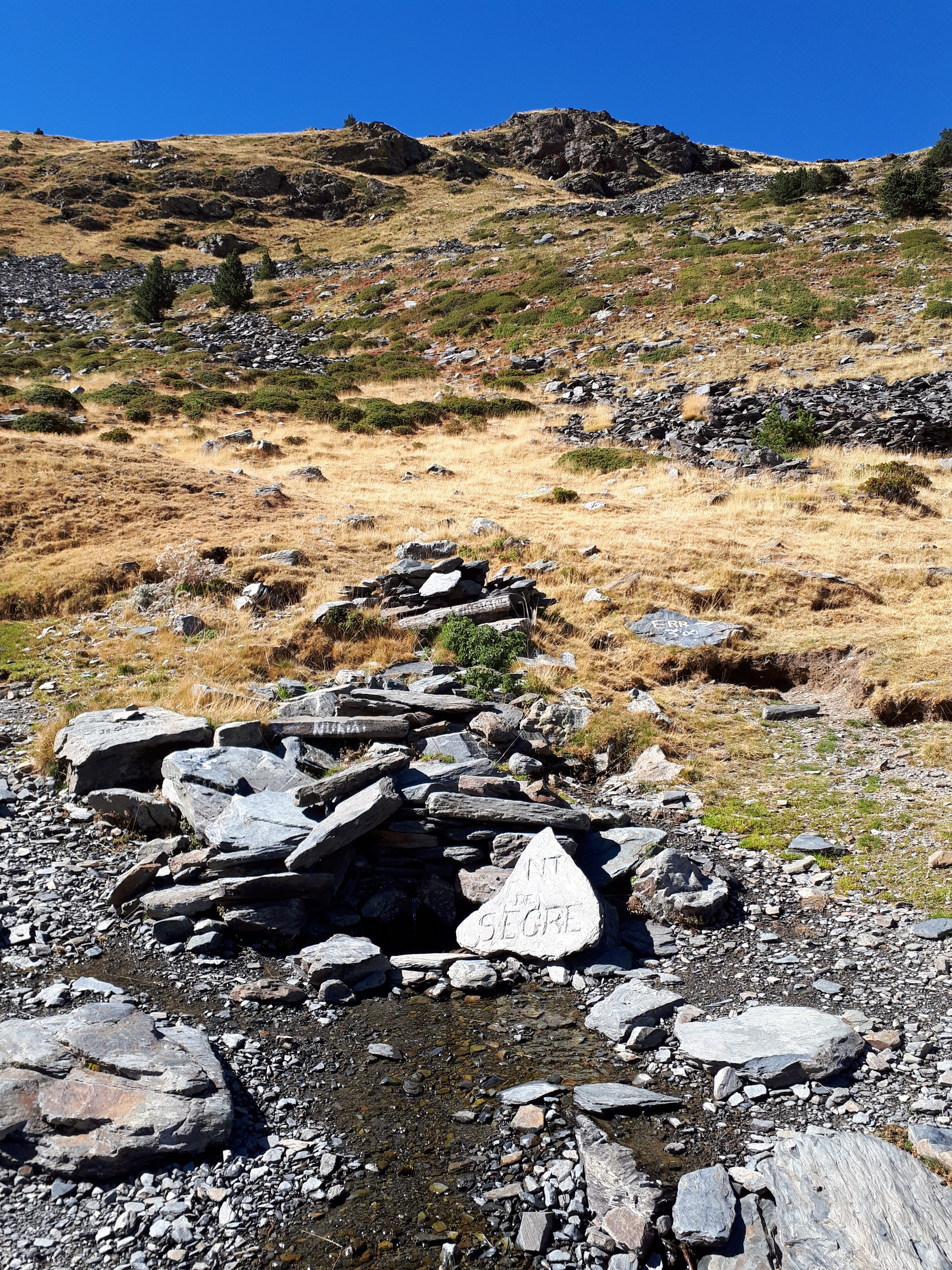
Font de Segre, the source of the Segre, altitude 2400 metres, Llo commune, Pyrénées-Orientales, France.

The river Segre, known to Romans and Greeks as Sicoris, and to the Arabs of Al-Andalus as Nahr az-Zaytūn (نهر الزيتون, River of Olives) has its sources on the north face of the Pic del Segre or Puigmal de Segre ("Segre's Peak") in the French department Pyrénées-Orientales (historically the comarca of Alta Cerdanya), in the Catalan Pyrenees. It follows a western direction all along the Cerdanya (Cerdagne) Valley, and crosses the town Saillagouse, the Spanish exclave Llívia, and Bourg-Madame.

It enters Spain at Puigcerdà and continues west until La Seu d'Urgell, where it meets the Valira River coming from Andorra. From this point, it adopts a south-western course across the pre-Pyrenees (with several dams along its gorges) and the western plains of Catalonia. It passes through Balaguer, Lleida, and flows into the Ebro at Mequinenza.

Among its tributaries: Valira (from Andorra), Noguera Pallaresa, Noguera Ribagorzana, and Cinca.

== In Lleida ==
The river Segre is an essential feature of the Lleida's geography, dividing the city in two. During the city's history, several floods have occurred, the last in the late 1970s. There is also a dam on the river, near the natural park La Mitjana. Another park, Els Camps Elisis, is adjacent to the Segre.

Many bridges span the river in the city of Lleida, namely: Pont Vell, Pont del Ferrocarril, Pont Nou, Pont de la Universitat, Pont de Pardinyes, Pont de Príncep de Viana, Passarel·la de Rufea, Passarel·la dels Maristes, Passarel·la d'Onze de Setembre, Passarel·la de Pardinyes, and Passarel·la del Liceu Escolar.

== See also ==
- List of rivers of Spain
- List of rivers of Catalonia
