= Quinto, Aragon =

Coordinates: 41°25′19″N 0°29′55″E

Quinto
- Town and municipality
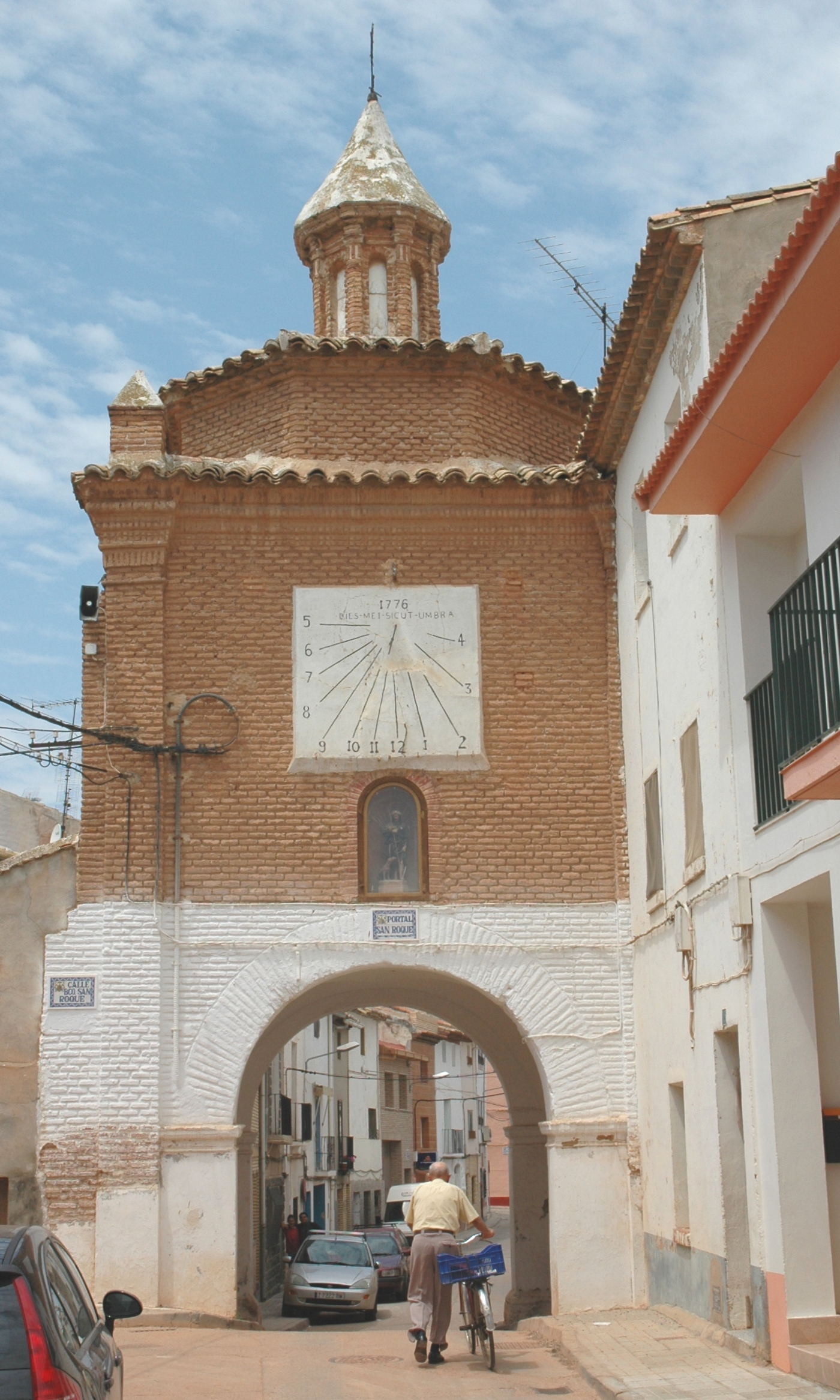
- San Roque towngate in Quinto

- Flag Coat of arms
- Interactive map of Quinto
- Country: Spain
- Autonomous community: Aragon
- Province: Zaragoza
- Municipality: Quinto

Area
  - Total: 118.4 km^{2} (45.7 sq mi)
- Elevation: 175 m (574 ft)

Population (2025-01-01)
  - Total: 1,882
  - Density: 15.90/km^{2} (41.17/sq mi)
- Time zone: UTC+1 (CET)
  - Summer (DST): UTC+2 (CEST)

Quinto (Spanish pronunciation: [ˈkinto]) is a town and municipality in the province of Zaragoza, northeast Spain. It is located on the south bank of the river Ebro about 41 km south-east of Zaragoza, capital city of Aragon. In 2017 its population was 1,960 (INE 2017), with an area of 118.40 km². Quinto is the capital of the comarca (county) of Ribera Baja del Ebro.

== Geography ==
=== Location ===
The municipality of Quinto is located in the Ebro Basin at 175 metres (574 feet) above sea level, on Quaternary deposits near the river Ebro. It is at a distance of 42 km from Zaragoza, capital city of the province and the autonomous community of Aragon.

=== Climate ===
According to the Köppen climatic classification, Quinto has a cold semi-arid climate (type BSk). The winters are slightly cold, with possible night frosts, and in December and January fog and temperature inversions are common. Summers are warm, with maximums above 30 °C, which usually pass 35 °C; the minimums are usually less than 20 °C. The wind called Cierzo can be strong at any season, especially from October to April. Precipitation surpasses scarcely the 300 annual mm, concentrating in spring and autumn, and winter and summer are dry. Snowfalls are unusual.

== History ==
=== Name ===
The name Quinto derives from the Latin word quintus, meaning "the fifth". It referred to the fifth milestone of the Roman road from Celsa (Velilla de Ebro) to Caesar Augusta (Zaragoza). It seems like the Roman administration set up some kind of military service around that mile marker, being that the origin of the settlement.

=== Early history ===
In the place called Las Dehesas, on the cliffs that dominate the river Ebro as it passes through the bridge of Gelsa, there is a settlement of the Early Iron Age. Its chronology covers approximately from 750 to 500 BCE, at which time it was totally destroyed by fire. The site is practically destroyed by some works carried out by Renfe.

The urban structure, with elongated rectangular house plans, corresponds to the classic schemes of this type of town in the middle Ebro Valley. The cereal grains, the remains of hand mills and Spengler's freshwater pearl mussel shells… they imply that the economy of the settlement was based on agriculture and husbandry, although accompanied by the collection of some wild products directly from nature.

=== The Middle Ages ===
About the Arabic past of Quinto, Pascual Madoz writes in the 19th century that the hill where the old parish church is located "served in the time of the Arabs as a formidable fort, still preserving by the N and S of that hill the foundations of its old towers". But Quinto is not documented for the first time until 1118, in the year of its conquest by the Christian king of Aragon, Alfonso I the Battler. Another document registers that in 1149 the ditch comes into service, with the consequent repopulation with Christians.

The first Lord of Quinto that we know is Atorella Ortiz, comrade-in-arms of King Peter II. In the middle years of the 14th century, the Barony of Quinto -that also included Gelsa, Velilla de Ebro, Matamala and Alforque- finally went to the Luna family, by marriages and inheritances. Years later, the King Martin I, gave the County of Luna to his grandson don Frederic, who took charge around 1412, until he was dispossessed of the county by King Alfonso V in 1430, for having rebelled. At that time began the construction of the old Parish Church of the Assumption of Saint Mary. Since 1430, and until the 17th century, Quinto was owned by the Funes family.

=== Early modern period ===
During the War of the Spanish Succession, the manor of Quinto supported the Bourbon family, for which Philip V, the victor, granted Quinto the title "Lealísima Villa" (Most Loyal Town). Some decades ago there was a tile on the façade of the old parish church with the phrase "El día quinto del mes quinto del año quinto entró en Quinto Felipe V" (The fifth day of the fifth month of the fifth year came in Quinto Philip V). According to this, the monarch visited the town on 5@th May 1705, the fifth day after his proclamation as king.

=== Late modern period ===
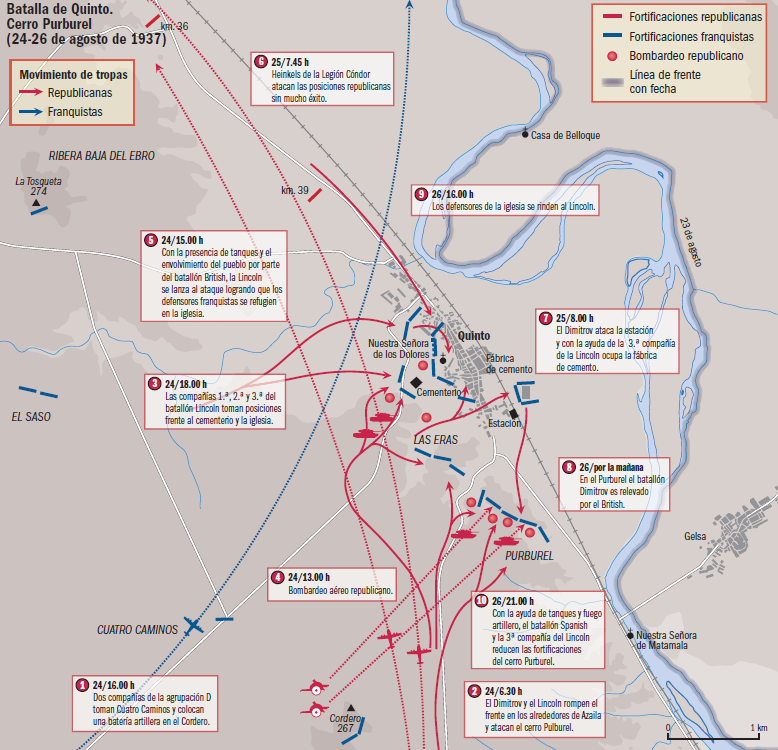
Taking of Quinto by the XV International Brigade in August 1937

During the First Carlist War, an army commanded by the Carlist Manuel Añón occupied Quinto in December 1835, and some of the most committed persons to the cause of the queen saw their houses sacked. The following year, three companies of the National Militia were created to defend the town.

Pascual Madoz, in his Geographic-statistical-historical Dictionary of Spain of 1845, describes Quinto with these words: «it has 419 houses of little taste and comforts, which are distributed in 11 narrow and badly paved streets, and a square destined to the public sale of groceries». He points out that inside its municipal area there were several limestone quarries, one gristmill, four oil mills, a brickyard and two bakeries. In terms of shops, there were two clothing stores, five groceries and two confectioners’. Madoz makes special mention of the Bath House of Quinto, writing that "they consist of 2 sources of saline water, whose never denied fame achieved in the past to be superstitious".

In the 20th century, the Spanish Civil War had a huge impact on the town. When the battle front was established in Quinto, numerous and intense combats were fought in its environs, during around fourteen months. The 26 August 1937, during the Battle of Belchite, the Spanish Republican forces (including the British Battalion of XV International Brigade) captured Quinto from the Nationalists, where they established its headquarters for about seven months. In March 1938 it was retaken by Franco's army. The fierce house-to-house fighting, artillery shots and air bombardments meant the practical devastation of the town (including the historic parish church of the Assumption), especially during the two offensives. After the war, the National Devastated Regions Service and local residents carried out several actions to reconstruct the town.

== Heritage ==
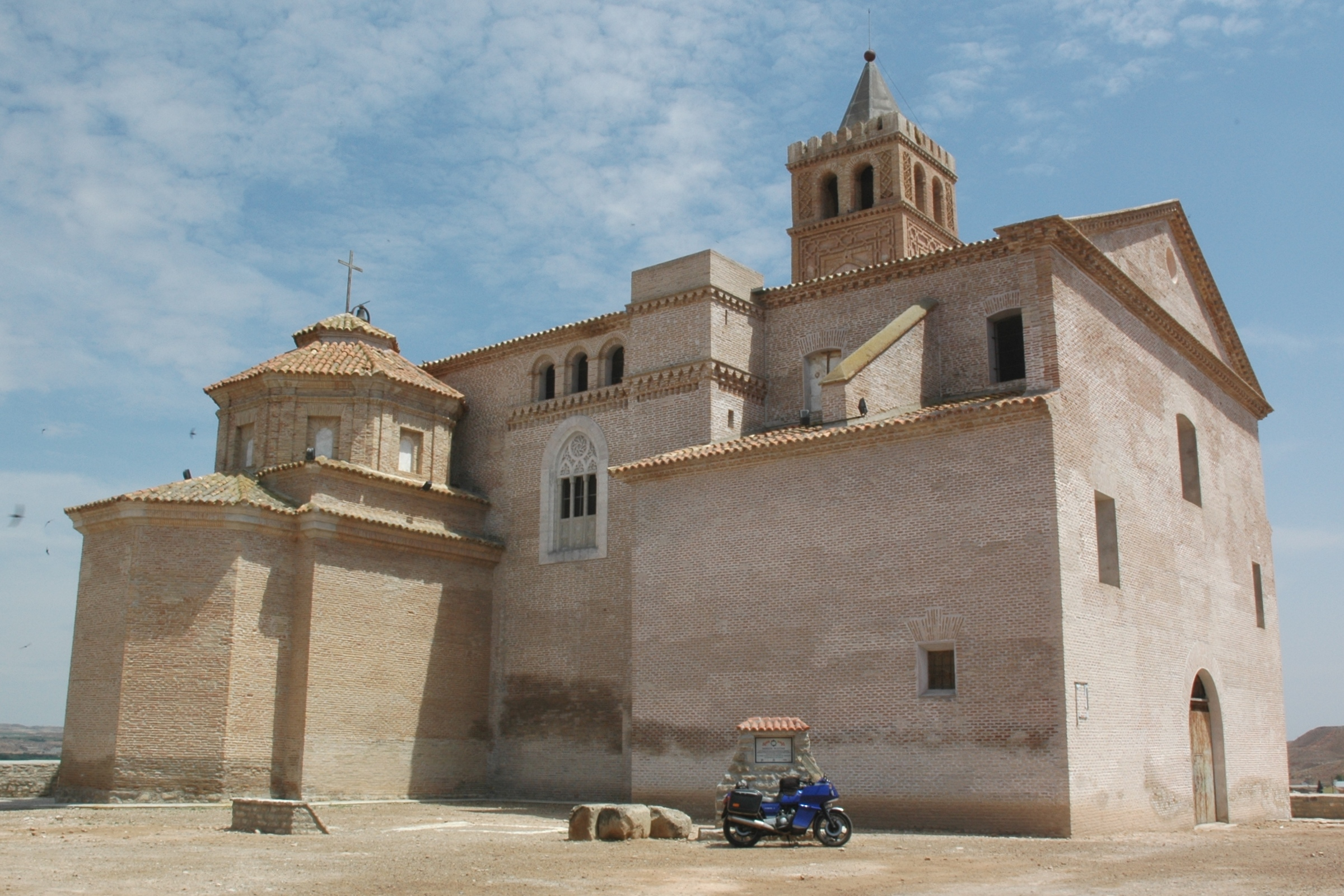
Church of the Assumption

=== Church of the Assumption ===
The old Church of the Assumption is the most important building of the town, and it was the former parish church. This Mudejar temple is located on the hill called "La Corona", and it towers above the whole town. Its construction began probably in 1416, and it was completed ten years later. Apparently, it stands on the remains of an Arab castle. The building, as it is observed at present, is the product of several construction phases. Its construction is attributed to Mudejar master builder Mahoma Ramí, architect of antipope Benedict XIII. It was seriously damaged as a result of the Spanish Civil War, especially the tower, so it was necessary to build a new church near the road. After the war, the National Devastated Regions Service consolidated its ruins for a better conservation as a Historical Monument.

=== Other religious buildings ===
Among the hermitages of Quinto, it is worth mentioning Bonastre and Matamala. Bonastre is located in a promontory next to the road to Castellón, about 7 km from the town. The current building is Baroque, probably from the 18th century, although it was rebuilt after the Spanish Civil War. The former Hermitage of Matamala is located almost 4 km from the town, situated between the railway line and the road from Quinto to Sástago, close to the river Ebro. According to Pascual Madoz, the temple was once a mosque. The hermitage is a modest example of popular typology of a primitive Gothic, attributable to the 13th century, and it is thought that it must have been the parish church of the former village of Matamala. Once this one disappeared, it appears as a hermitage since at least 1489. This chapel underwent several cuts, which together with the danger derived from the increase of the traffic both in the road and in the railroad, took to erect in 2001 a new hermitage of functional design in a different place.

Another remarkable building is the former Parochial House. It stands out among the rest of the houses, which are more modest constructions, of popular architecture. The Archbishop of Zaragoza ordered the rector of the Church in Quinto to build this typical Aragonese mansion in 1581.

=== Civil architecture ===
The interesting town gates of Quinto had a defensive-military origin, with a typology of medieval origin. Its mission was to defend the entrances of the town. The perimeter was protected by high and strong walls, formed by the backside of the houses that gave to the exterior road that surrounded the enclosure wall. The current appearance of the gates dates from the late 17th century or the first half of the 18th century. They are three: San Miguel’s Gate was the entrance coming from Zaragoza, San Antón’s Gate was the access to the vegetable gardens, and the exit from the town towards Alcañiz was through San Roque’s Gate.

Less than 4 kilometers from Quinto, in the vicinity of the Hermitage of Matamala, there is a hill with the last vestiges of the castle of Matamala, from the Muslim period. It can be guessed that it had a rectangular floor plan, about 25 by 20 m. On the east side we can distinguish the ruins of a square tower.

The so-called "Torre de Bonastre" rises near the Hermitage of Bonastre. It is a square watch tower built in the 19th century, in the context of the Carlist Wars.

=== Museums ===
Inside the old parish church of the Assumption it is situated the first mummy museum in Spain.

== See also ==
- Ribera Baja del Ebro
- List of municipalities in Zaragoza
