= Rueda Abbey =

Coordinates: 41°17′49″N 0°18′49″W

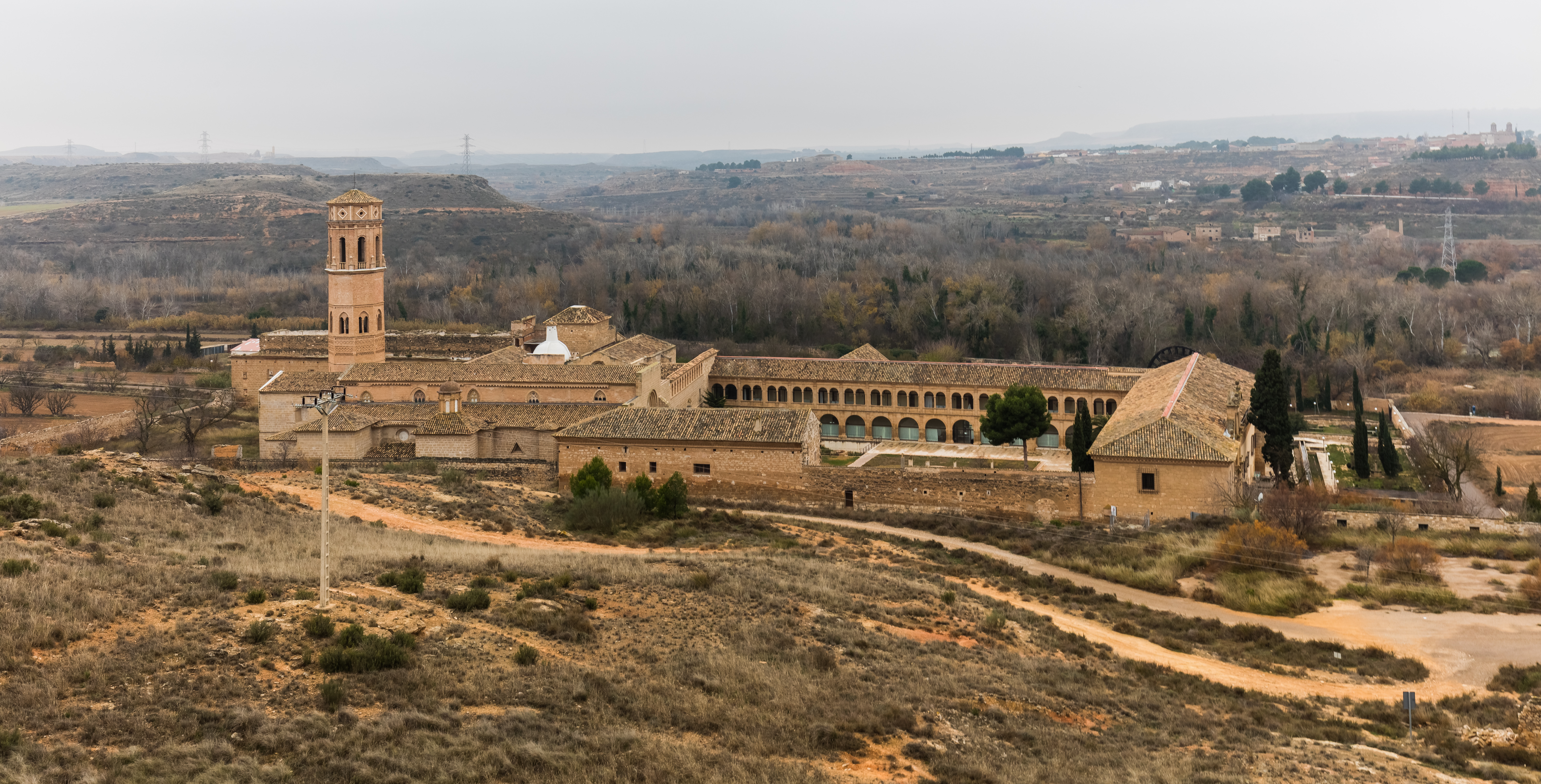
Panorama of the abbey buildings

Rueda Abbey or Rueda de Ebro Abbey (Spanish: Real Monasterio de Nuestra Señora de Rueda, or the "Royal Monastery of Our Lady of the Wheel") is a former Cistercian monastery in Sástago in the Ribera Baja del Ebro comarca, province of Zaragoza, Aragon, Spain, 74 kilometres to the south-east of Zaragoza on the left bank of the Ebro. The buildings have been preserved by the government and are intended to be used for a hotel and conference centre.

== History ==
=== Early history ===
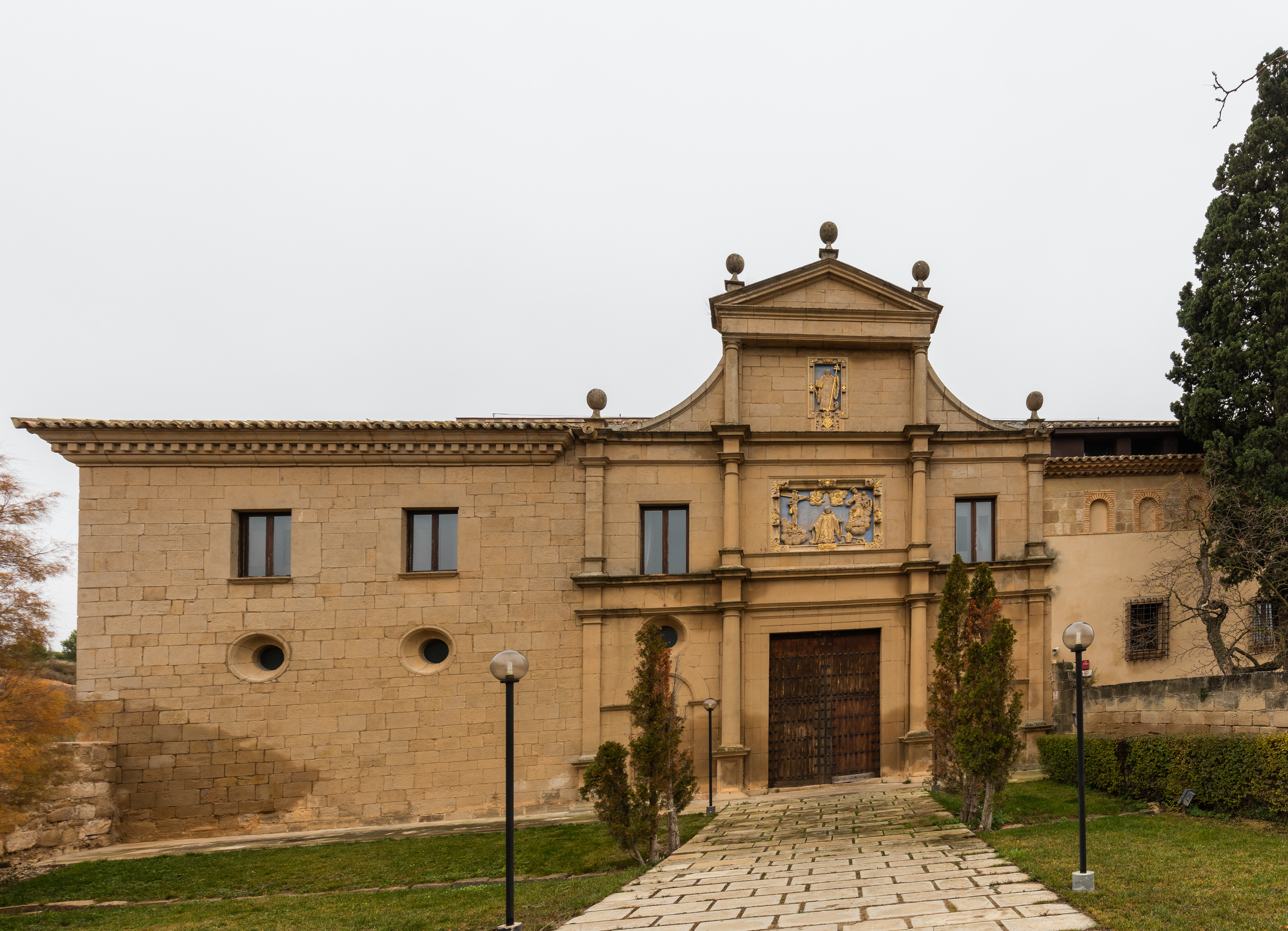
Main entry.

The first Cistercian monastery was founded in Cîteaux, France in the year 1089. Thence four daughter abbeys were spawned, including in the year 1115 one in Morimond, France. Monks from the Morimond Abbey founded the Gimont Abbey in France in 1152. The monks of Gimont received a land grant in Burjazud (Villanueva de Gállego, north of Zaragoza), Spain in 1162 but the monastery was not built there. This land was augmented by a grant from King Alfonso II of Aragon in 1182 to include the riverside steep castle and village of Escatrón, about 50 km south-east downstream from Zaragoza. After two more decades the Real Monasterio de Nuestra Señora de Rueda was founded on the banks of the Ebro River, next to a fluvial island and a salt lagoon (~12 km North).

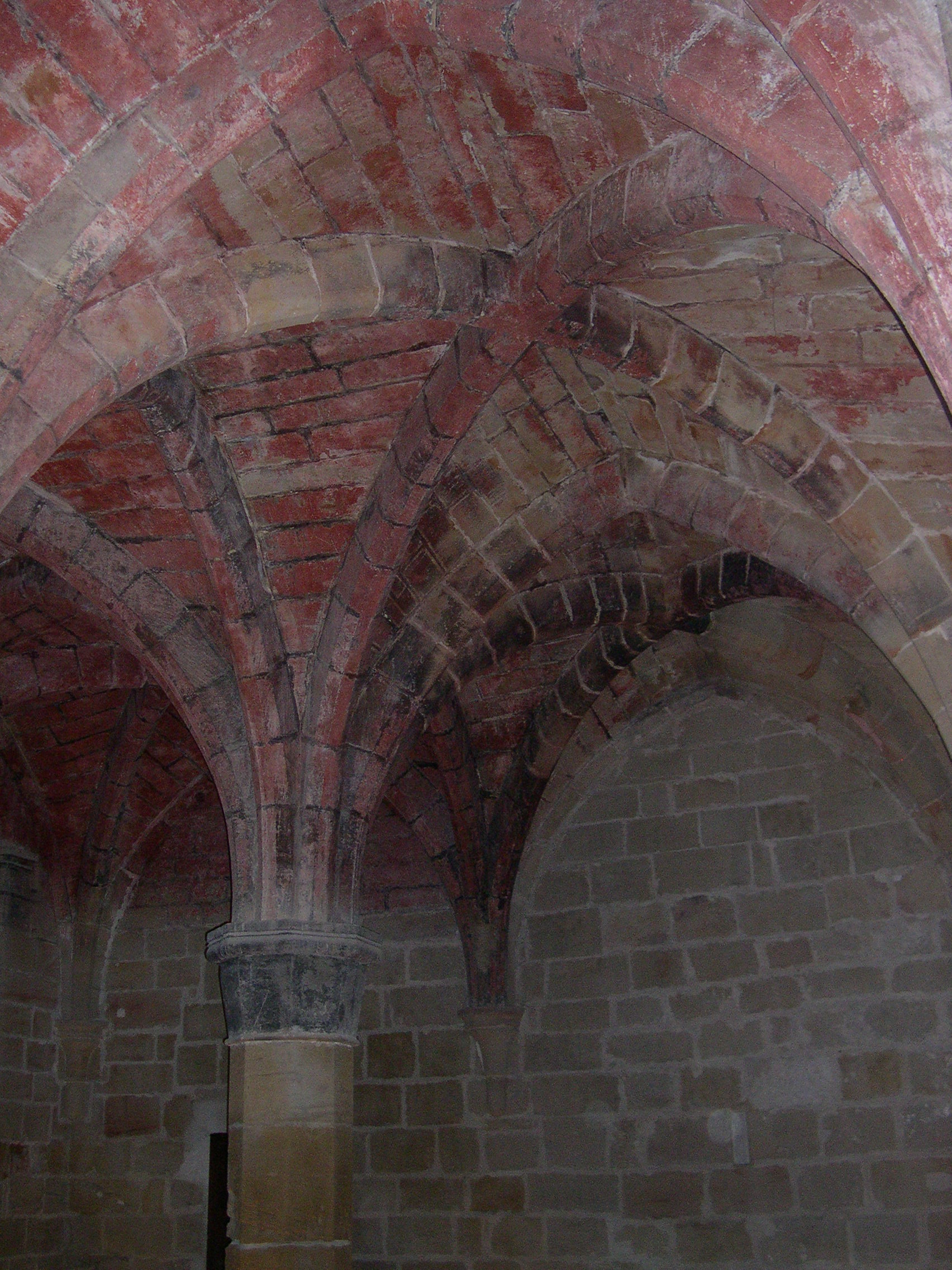
Interior view.

The principal works had begun by the end of the first quarter of the 13th century, and the first church was consecrated before the year 1238. A lavatorium was constructed in the 13th century. The cloisters were designed using a barrel vaulted stonework construction. By the beginning of the early 15th century the old Abbot's Palace, the farm support buildings and laity area were complete. From the early founding the monks conducted important hydrological works including a dam on the Ebro and creation of a massive waterwheel or "rueda". The waterwheel diverted some of the river flow to a Gothic aqueduct for distribution to various parts of the monastery; moreover, many of the water channels and plumbing uses are readily visible today. This series of hydrological innovations was an early example of indoor plumbing and waste disposal as well as a bona fide central heating system.

In the uninhabited Muslim frontier, the monks developed many useful implements, such as the salt mule track, saltwork equipment, a fluvial pier, a fluvial mule barge transport, an oil mill, a flour mill, a stone irrigation ditch with a waterwheel, a vineyard, a wine cellar, and an orchard surrounded by a sentry-boxed wall.

=== Modern era ===
Further improvements and more elaborate reconstructions took place in the 16th and 17th centuries, especially around the principal square. Noteworthy is the Renaissance arcade in Herrerian style that connects the medieval building complex with the Abbot's Palace. Thence a range of further new novices' rooms and bedrooms were built behind the arcade.

The Royal Gateway, a gatehouse structure dating from the 17th and 18th centuries, serves as the modern day entrance to the entire complex.

=== 19th century to present ===
As a result of the Ecclesiastical Confiscations of Mendizábal of 1837 and 1838, lands and buildings belonging to the monastery were sold and the site was used for farming, with considerable destruction taking place. In 1990 the property came under governmental control through acquisition by the Diputacion General de Aragón. Thereafter huge expenses, considerable conservation and restoration occurred. The present including a three-star hotel and conference rooms. None of the Middle Ages portion has been altered. More restorations are in future plan.

== See also ==
- List of Bienes de Interés Cultural in the Province of Zaragoza
