= 70th Division (Spain) =

- 70.ª División
- Flag of the 70th Division
- Active: 23 September 1937–March 1939
- Country: Spanish Republic
- Allegiance: Republican faction
- Branch: Spanish Republican Army
- Type: Infantry
- Size: Division
- Engagements: Spanish Civil War: Battle of Teruel; Aragon Offensive; Levante Offensive; Battle of Valsequillo

The 70th Division was one of the divisions of the Spanish Republican Army that were created during the Spanish Civil War.

== History ==
The 70th Division was formed on 23 September 1937, passing its period of instruction through Almuradiel and Campo de Criptana. It was initially made up of the 92nd and 95th mixed brigades, although the 32nd, 79th, 94th and 132nd mixed brigades were later also integrated.

=== Battle of Teruel ===
At the beginning of the offensive on Teruel on 15 December 1937, it was placed in reserve, but it was soon attached to the XVIII Army Corps and entered combat. At the end of December, it was located west of Teruel, in the La Muela sector, defending the accesses to the city against the nationalist counteroffensive on 29 December. At first it was driven back by the nationalists divisions, but on 1 January, in a counteroffensive, it managed to recover part of the lost ground. Shortly afterwards, it was transferred to the rear, and after the Battle of Alfambra, it became part of the XXI Army Corps in the Vivel del Río sector. Between 15 and 17 February, together with the 34th and 35th divisions, it was repelled from Vivel del Río by the nationalist divisions.

=== Aragon Offensive ===
When the rebels began their offensive through the Ebro valley in March 1938, the division was forced to retreat along with the rest of the XXI Army Corps towards the sector. from Ejulve to Rillo. It suffered the first attacks, and had to go to the reserve soon due to the losses suffered.

=== Maestrazgo Campaign ===
In April it was in Albocácer, in the recovery phase. At the beginning of May, nationalist divisions from Morella attacked the areas La Iglesuela del Cid and Villafranca del Cid, an attack that was accompanied by another on Ares del Maestre, a sector defended by the 70th division. This last attack took place on 18 May, which was not only repulsed but also provoked a strong counterattack under a weather of wind, rain and hail that caused heavy casualties and the end of the offensive in said sector. This concentration of the nationalist attack led to the creation of the Toral Group on 11 May, under the command of Nilamón Toral, while the 70th division was provisionally commanded by Jose M. Jiménez. On 9 June, when the republican front was broken, the 70th division retired to the rear to recover.

On 11 June it was used, without success, in a counterattack against the nationalist advances on Borriol. Involved in the defense of Castellón, it covered the Sant Joan de Moró sector, resisting attacks on 13 June. After Castellón fell on 14 June, it retreated behind the Mijares river, defending the accesses to Burriana and Onda. After containing the rebels in this area, the division began to reorganize itself into the rear and to depend on the XXII Army Corps. During the nationalist offensive on the XYZ line, the 70th Division remained in reserve. With the start of the Battle of the Ebro the nationalist offensive against Valencia ended, and the division enjoyed a period of calm after 8 months of fighting.

In September 1938 it participated in an attempt to cut the railway line from Teruel to Sagunto, together with the 67th Division and a couple of brigades. After the initial success, the rebels recovered their positions after a 6-day fight. It also intervened with other divisions in an attack on Nules that began on 7 November and ended four days later. Despite the performance of the Republicans, the offensive was stopped in its tracks.

=== Battle of Valsequillo ===
It also participated in the Battle of Valsequillo, the last republican offensive of the civil war. It intervened from the first day of the offensive, on 5 January, in the second wave, occupying various heights. When it tried to progress on day 6, it encountered strong resistance in Mano de Hierro and El Médico that it could not overcome, thus preventing the widening of the rupture zone. In later days it tried to overcome this resistance by attacking the rear in Sierra Tejonera, but it was arrested after heavy fighting. The operation ended in a failure on 2 February.

== Command ==
Commanders

- Nilamón Toral (23 September 1937 to 7 December 1938)
- Tomás Centeno Sierra (7 December 1938 to 21 December 1938)
- Miguel Gallo Martínez (21 December 1938 to 5 March 1939)
- Juan Arcas (5 March 1939 until its dissolution in that month)

Commissars

- Germán Fonseca Vázquez, of the PSOE;
- Luis Díez, of the PCE;

Chiefs of Staff

- Juan Jiménez Esteban;

== Organization ==
Date	Attached Army Corps	Integrated Mixed Brigades	Battle front
November 1937	XVIII Army Corps	92nd, 95th	Aragon
March–April 1938	XXI Army Corps	32nd, 92nd, 132nd	Levante
August 1938	XXII Army Corps	32nd, 79th, 92nd	Levante
November 1938	XXII Army Corps	32nd, 79th	Levante
January 1939	XXII Army Corps	32nd, 79th, 92nd	Estremadura

== Bibliography ==
- Álvarez, Santiago (1989). Los comisarios políticos en el Ejército Popular de la República (in Spanish). Ediciós do Castro.
- Engel, Carlos (1999). Historia de las Brigadas Mixtas del Ejército Popular de la República (in Spanish). Madrid: Almena. ISBN 84-922644-7-0.
- Martínez Bande, José Manuel (1974). La batalla de Teruel (in Spanish). Madrid: San Martín. ISBN 84-7140-088-X.
- Martínez Bande, José Manuel (1975). La llegada al mar (in Spanish). Madrid: San Martín. ISBN 84-7140-115-0.
- Martínez Bande, José Manuel (1977). La ofensiva sobre Valencia (in Spanish). Madrid: San Martín. ISBN 84-7140-142-8.
- Martínez Bande, José Manuel (1985). El final de la Guerra Civil (in Spanish). Madrid: San Martín. ISBN 84-7140-232-7.
- Salas Larrazábal, Ramón (2006). Historia del Ejército Popular de la República (in Spanish). Madrid: La Esfera de los libros. ISBN 84-9734-465-0.
