= 95th Mixed Brigade =

Unit of the Spanish Republican Army

- 95.ª Brigada Mixta
- Active: June 1937–February 1939
- Country: Spain
- Allegiance: (Second Spanish Republic) Republican faction
- Branch: Spanish Republican Army
- Type: Marine infantry
- Size: Brigade
- Engagements: Spanish Civil War: Battle of Brunete; Battle of Teruel; Aragon Offensive; Balaguer Offensive; Battle of the Ebro; Catalonia Offensive

The 95th Mixed Brigade was a unit of the Spanish Republican Army that took part in the Spanish Civil War. Throughout the war, various brigades came to use the number "95", operating on various fronts.

== History ==
=== First stage ===
In June 1937, a mixed brigade was formed in Villarrobledo that received the number "95", made up of former anarchist militiamen and replacements from 1932 to 1935. It was commanded by César-David Sal de Rellán, with Fernando González Montoliu as political commissar. In July, despite the fact that its organization was far behind schedule, it was sent to the front to take part in the Battle of Brunete, where it did not perform well. After the end of the fighting, it was withdrawn to the rear and finally dissolved.

=== Second stage ===
In the summer of 1937, a brigade of Marine Infantry was created, numbered "95", under the command of José García Gamboa. After completing the training phase, the 95th Mixed Brigade was left under the command of Juan Luque Canís. Later it became part of the 70th Division.

In December 1937, it took part in the Battle of Teruel, being sent on December 30 to the Campillo sector to try to close an enemy gap in the front. During the operations in Teruel, command of the unit fell to Vicente Alonso Fernández, with the anarchist José Nadal Martí as commissar. On February 6, 1938, it was located south of La Muela. Two days later, the 95th Mixed Brigade was withdrawn from the front, becoming attached to the general reserve of the Eastern Army. Later, it was assigned to the 72nd Division of the XVIII Army Corps.

On March 9, 1938, after the start of the nationalist offensive on the Aragon front, the 95th Mixed Brigade was sent to the Belchite sector to try to plug the open gap in the Fuendetodos area as a consequence of the collapse of the front. During the fighting that followed, the unit suffered casualties of such caliber that it ended up being disbanded, and the survivors of the 95th Mixed Brigade were employed to reinforce the 94th Mixed Brigade —by then, also very worn out.

=== Third stage ===
On April 19, 1938, a new brigade of marine infantry was created from surpluses of the 122nd Mixed Brigade of the 27th Division, which adopted the numbering of the twice dissolved 95th Mixed Brigade and was integrated into the 60th Division of the XVIII Army Corps, in the Vallfogona de Balaguer sector. On May 22 it took part in the Balaguer Offensive, attacking the town of Vallfogona de Balaguer, which was defended by the requetés of the Tercio de Nuestra Señora de Valvanera; Although the 95th Mixed Brigade did reach the irrigation canal that served as a defensive line, it ended up being rejected. Other subsequent attacks were also unsuccessful.

Later it participated in the Battle of the Ebro. At the beginning of August, it crossed the Ebro and was located in the sector that went from Fayón to Villalba de los Arcos, although shortly afterwards its right front reached only as far as La Pobla de Massaluca. From mid-August it faced enemy counterattacks and held its lines in the defensive triangle formed by Villalba de los Arcos, Corbera and the Vértice Gaeta, for eight days. Finally, on September 12, it was relieved by forces of the 42nd Division. The bloody fighting in the Ebro caused a loss of such caliber that the 95th Mixed Brigade was left in the rear, reaching the Baix Ebre sector.

At the beginning of December, it was sent to the Preixens-Agramunt sector, in anticipation of the next nationalist offensive in Catalonia. However, the 95th Mixed Brigade could not resist the enemy attack and on January 13, 1939, it evacuated Agramunt, retreating to Cervera, a town that it lost two days later. From then on, a slow retreat began towards the French border, which it reached in February.

== Controls ==
Commanders-in-chief

- César-David Sal de Rellán;
- José García Gamboa;
- Juan Luque Canís;
- Vicente Alonso Fernández;

Commissars

- Fernando González Montoliu;
- José Nadal Martí, of the CNT;

== Bibliography ==
- Álvarez, Santiago (1989). Los comisarios políticos en el Ejército Popular de la República (in Spanish). Ediciós do Castro.
- Cabrera Castillo, Francisco (2002). Del Ebro a Gandesa. La batalla del Ebro, julio-noviembre 1938 (in Spanish). Almena.
- Engel, Carlos (1999). Historia de las brigadas mixtas del Ejército Popular de la República (in Spanish). Almena Ediciones.
- Maldonado, José M.ª (2007). El frente de Aragón. La Guerra Civil en Aragón (1936–1938) (in Spanish). Mira Editores. ISBN 978-84-8465-237-3.
- Martínez Bande, José Manuel (1972). La Ofensiva sobre Segovia y la batalla de Brunete (in Spanish). Madrid: San Martín.
- Martínez Bande, José Manuel (1978). La Batalla del Ebro (in Spanish). Madrid: San Martín.
