= Ribera Baja del Ebro =

Coordinates: 41°25′N 0°30′E

- Comarca

- Flag Coat of arms
- Interactive map of Ribera Baja del Ebro
- Country: Spain
- Autonomous community: Aragon
- Province: Zaragoza
- Capital: Quinto
- Municipalities: List: Alborge, Alforque, Cinco Olivas, Escatrón, Gelsa, Pina de Ebro, Quinto, Sástago, Velilla de Ebro and La Zaida

Area
  - Total: 989.9 km^{2} (382.2 sq mi)

Population
  - Total: 9,418
  - Density: 9.514/km^{2} (24.64/sq mi)
- Time zone: UTC+1 (CET)
  - Summer (DST): UTC+2 (CEST)
- Largest municipality: Quinto

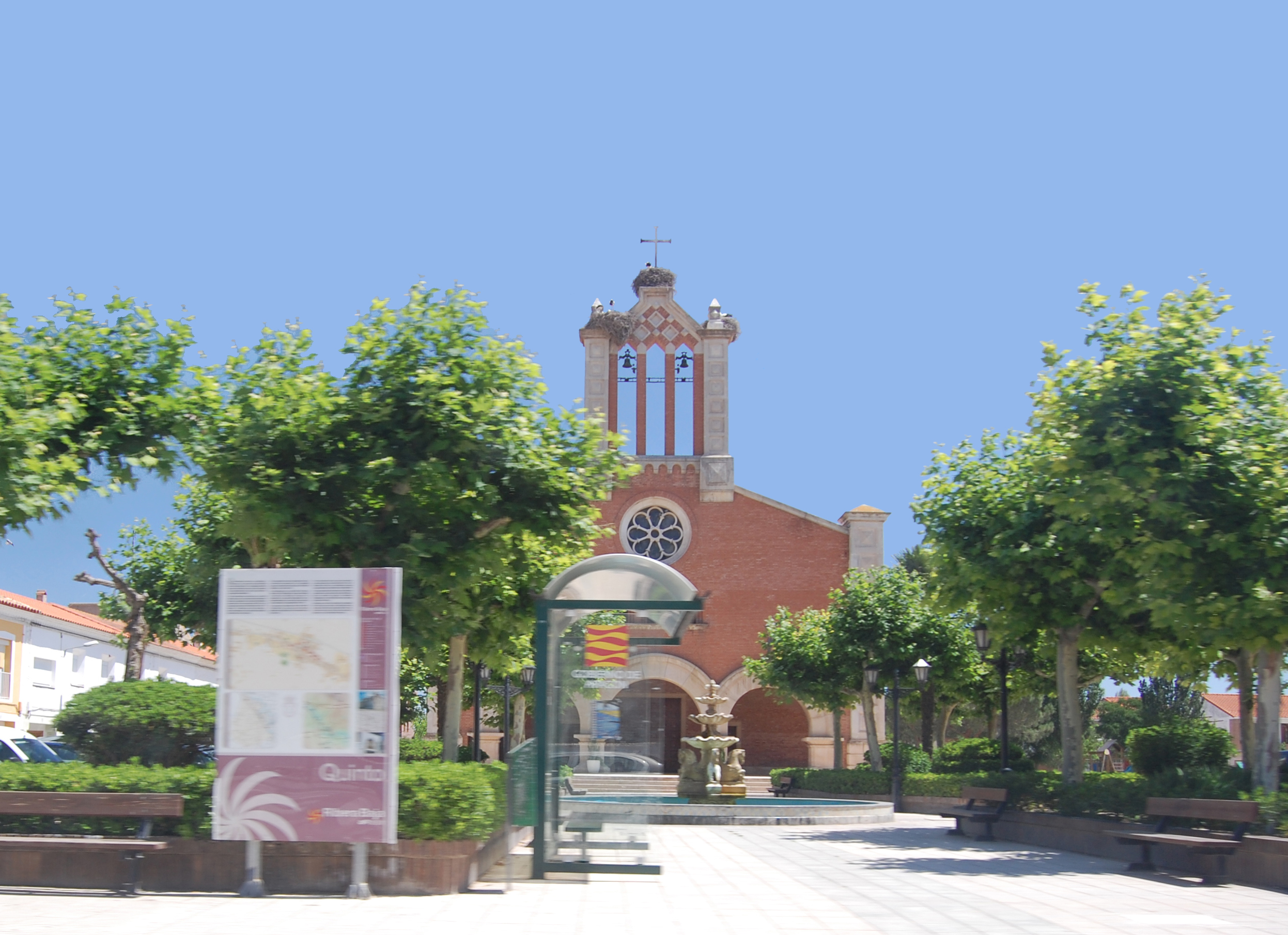
Main church in Quinto

Ribera Baja del Ebro is a comarca in eastern Aragon, Spain. It is part of the historical region of Lower Aragon. The most important town is Quinto.

It is located by the River Ebro about 40 km south-east of Zaragoza. The traditional economy was based on the cultivation of cereals and olive trees.

This comarca has a dry, continental climate, with marked seasonal changes, the summers are hot and relatively short compared with the long cold winters. Sometimes it is subjected to floods caused by River Ebro.

== See also ==
- Rueda Abbey
- Comarcas of Aragon
- Lower Aragon
