= 225th Mixed Brigade (Spain) =

225th Mixed Brigade 225.ª Brigada Mixta
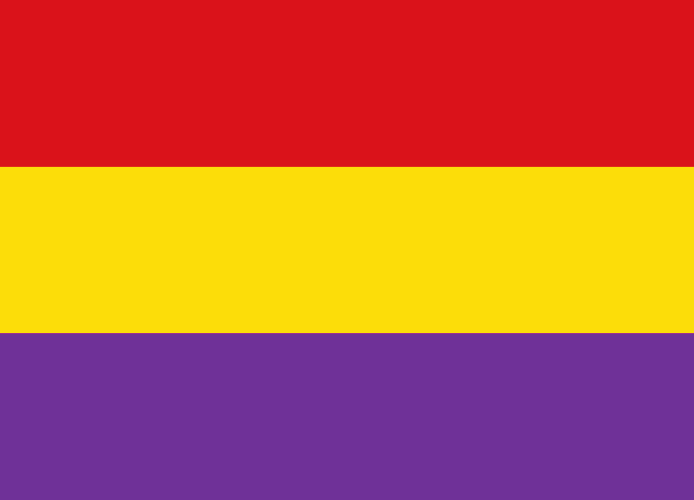
- Military flag of the Popular Army
- Active: 1937–1939
- Country: Spain
- Branch: Spanish Republican Army
- Type: Mixed Brigade
- Role: Home Defence
- Size: Four battalions: The 897, 898, 899 and 900
- Part of: Coastal Defence (1937); 72nd Division (1937 - 1938); 64th Division (1938); 72nd Division (1938 - 1939)
- Garrison/HQ: Valencia
- Engagements: Spanish Civil War

Commanders
- Notable commanders: Alejandro Sáenz de San Pedro; Juan Serrano Jiménez

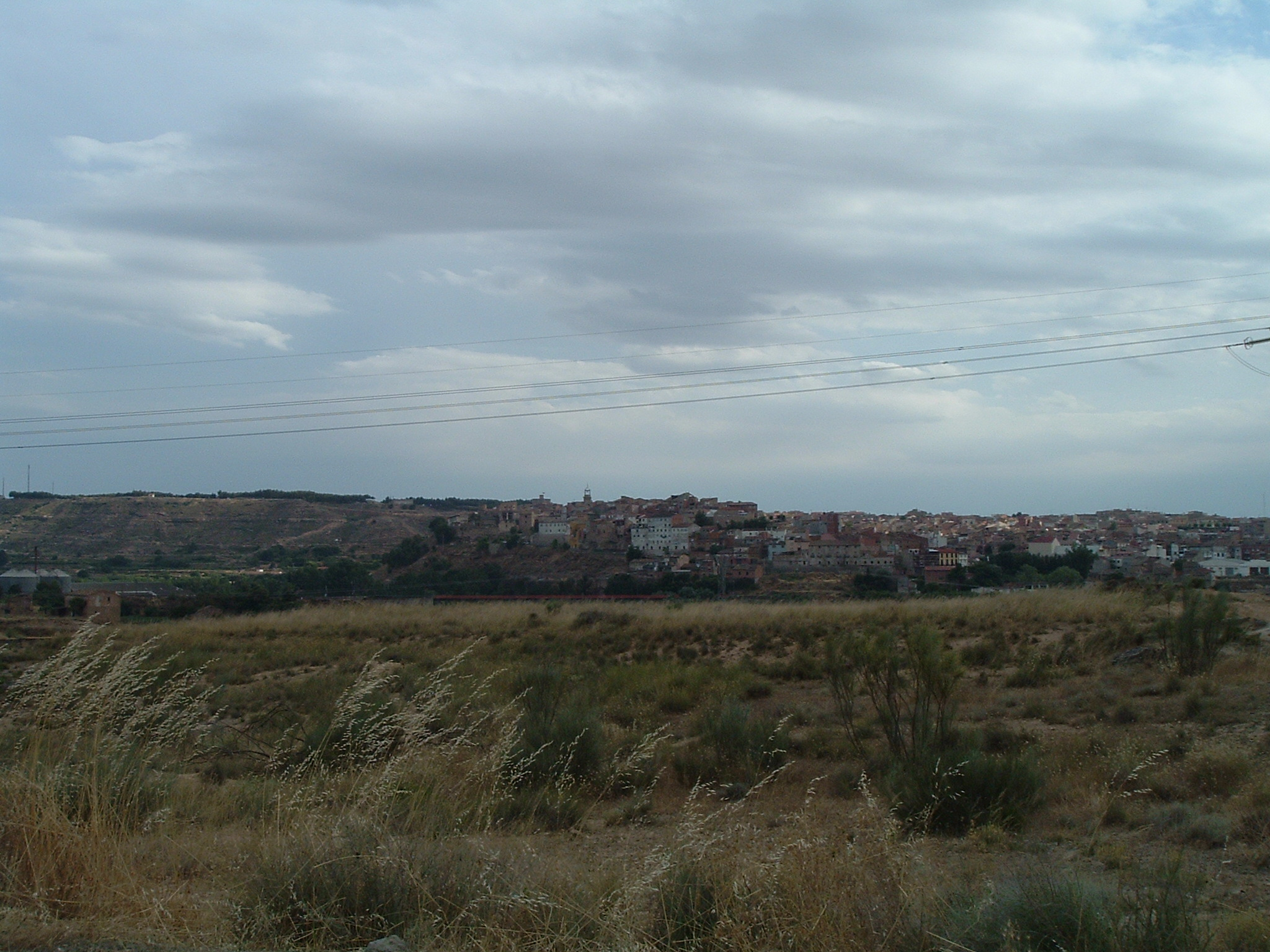
The 225th Mixed Brigade lost most of its men in the bloodbath of the arid area between Caspe and Escatrón.

The 225th Mixed Brigade (Spanish: 225.ª Brigada Mixta), was a mixed brigade of the Spanish Republican Army in the Spanish Civil War. It was formed in the summer of 1937 in Valencia with units belonging to the Eastern Coastal Defence and had four battalions, the 897, 898, 899 and 900.

In early March 1938 this mixed brigade was sent to the front in Aragon where it did not fare well. It suffered so many losses that it was disbanded. Later it was reorganized and was sent to Extremadura, to one of the last combats of the Civil War in 1939 before the Spanish Republic was defeated by the rebel faction.

== History ==
=== First phase and debacle in Aragon ===
The 225th Mixed Brigade was established in August 1937 in Eastern Coastal Spain. Its mission was the Coastal Defence (Defensa de Costas) of the Peninsular shore between Santa Pola and Vinaròs in the present-day Valencian Community. The command of the unit was assigned to Infantry Commander Alejandro Sáenz de San Pedro Albarellos, former Captain of the Infantry Regiment Guadalajara 10 (Regimiento Guadalajara n° 10) which was garrisoned in Valencia at the time of the July 1936 coup.

At the end of February 1938 the 225th Mixed Brigade was placed under the 72nd Division of the XVIII Army Corps of the Levantine Army (Ejército de Levante) which was being reorganized close to the Teruel front line.

On 11 March 1938, at the time of the during the rebel offensive in Aragon, the brigade was sent to cover the Escatrón and Caspe sector. During the Nationalist attacks in this arid area of Aragon the 225th Mixed Brigade was so badly shattered and had suffered such grievous losses, that it was no longer operational and had to be disbanded by the high command.

=== Reorganization and end in Extremadura ===
Shortly thereafter the 225th Mixed Brigade was reorganized in Libros, by the Turia River, within the 64th Division of the XIX Army Corps. The brigade's new commander was Militia Major Juan Serrano Jiménez, for its former commander Sáenz de San Pedro was promoted to the command of the 64th Division. The 225th Mixed Brigade was sent to defend the western end of the Eastern Front, where there was a lull in the battles against the rebels, until 25 July when the Spanish Republican strategic operations saw a shift with the onset of the Battle of the Ebro.

On 17 December the brigade was transferred westwards to Extremadura in preparation of the Battle of Peñarroya, one of the last battles of the war. It was in cantonment in Jamilena and Torredonjimeno and placed in the 72nd Division of the General Reserve of the GERC or Group of Central Region Armies (Grupo de Ejércitos de la Región Central). In the ensuing battle the 225th Mixed Brigade was active both within and outside of the pocket, reinforcing the thrust of the XXII Army Corps. Between 17 and 23 January 1939 it launched a series of bold attacks in the Sierra de Mesegara and Sierra del Torozo ranges of La Serena area that made the brigade suffer a very high number of casualties. The much battered 225th Mixed Brigade remained in the Extremaduran Front until the end of the war though.

== See also ==
- Spanish Civil War, 1938–39
- Mixed Brigades
- Battle of Valsequillo

== Bibliography ==
- Pedro Corral Corral, Si me quieres escribir: La batalla de Teruel (If You Want to Write Me: The Battle of TeruelThe Battle of Teruel), Cronica, 2005. ISBN 9788497936262
