= Melecio =

Melecio is a given name.

== People with the given name ==
- Melecio Arranz (1888–1966), Filipino politician and engineer
- Melecio Álvarez Garrido (1896–1940), Leonese anarcho-syndicalist
- Melecio Figueroa (1842–1903), Filipino sculptor and engraver
- Juan R. Melecio Machuca (1934–2022), Puerto Rican lawyer
- Melecio Go, Filipino politician

== See also ==
- Melancholia
