= 224th Mixed Brigade (Spain) =

224th Mixed Brigade 224.ª Brigada Mixta
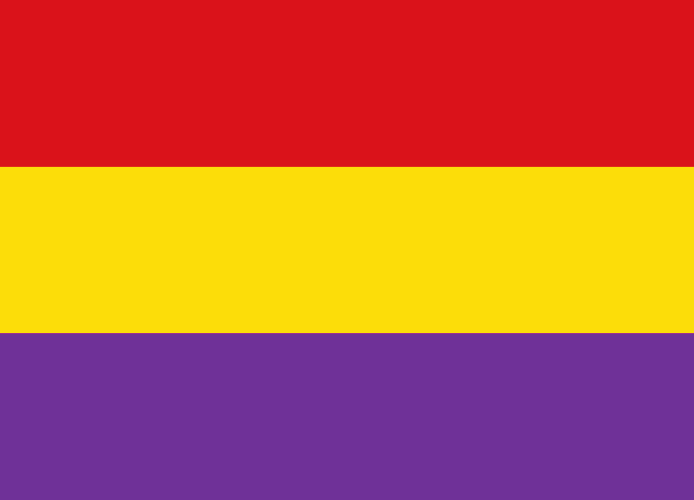
- Military flag of the Popular Army
- Active: 1937–1939
- Country: Spain
- Branch: Spanish Republican Army
- Type: Mixed Brigade
- Role: Home Defence
- Size: Four battalions: The 893, 894, 895 and 896
- Part of: Coastal Defence (1937); 72nd Division (1937–1938); 60th Division (1938)
- Engagements: Spanish Civil War

Commanders
- Notable commanders: Martín Calvo Calvo; Antonio Moya Gabarrón

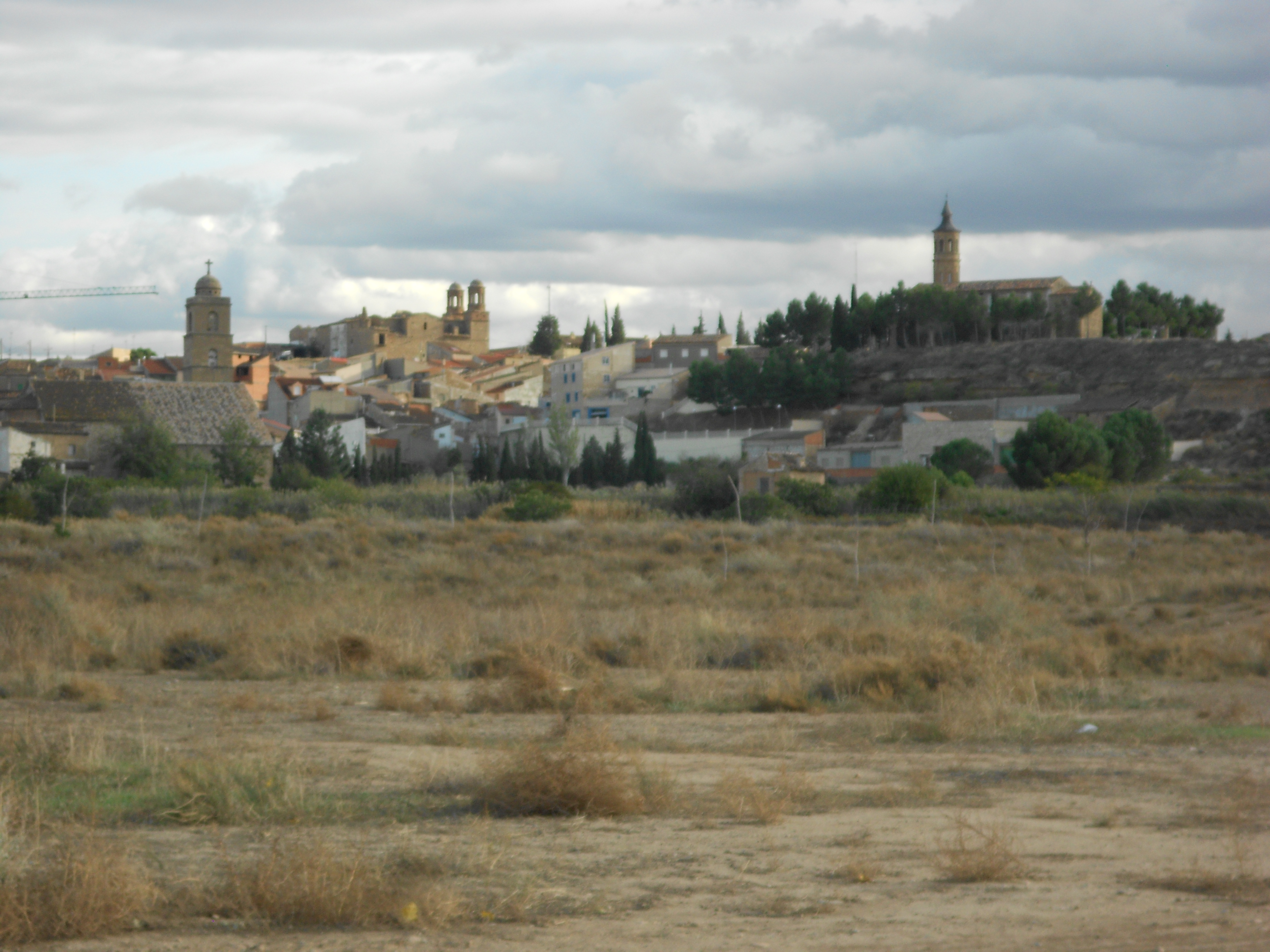
The 224th Mixed Brigade lost most of its men in the bloodbath of the arid area between Escatrón and Caspe.

The 224th Mixed Brigade (Spanish: 224.ª Brigada Mixta) was a mixed brigade of the Spanish Republican Army in the Spanish Civil War. It was formed in summer 1937 in Catalonia from scattered Coastal Defence units and had four battalions: the 893, 894, 895 and 896.

In early March 1938 this mixed brigade was sent to combat in Aragon without adequate equipment and training. Within a short time its battalions were decimated in such a manner that only a few demoralized men remained and the brigade was disbanded.

The number of this unit was assigned then to a new brigade established a month later, on 19 April 1938. This new mixed brigade also suffered many losses and only a few of its men survived and were able to cross the French border while fleeing from the advancing rebel armies.

== History ==
The 224th Mixed Brigade was established in August 1937 in Catalonia with Coastal Defence (Defensa de Costas) units as a military reserve unit for the Levantine Army (Ejército de Levante). The command of the unit was entrusted to Infantry Commander Martín Calvo Calvo, who had been a retired Captain at the time of the July 1936 coup. The commissar was Ignacio Fernández of the Communist Party of Spain (PCE).

=== First unit: Aragon ===
The 224th Mixed Brigade was placed under the 72nd Division of the XVIII Army Corps of the Levantine Army (Ejército de Levante). It was sent with this division to the Teruel front line, but the organization of both the brigade and its division was still so deficient that it was not possible to use them in combat and thus it was camped as reserve unit south of La Muela. On 7 March 1938 the brigade was sent, still not fully equipped, to the Battle of Belchite during the imminent rebel offensive in Aragon, but it was overwhelmed by the sheer force and intensity of the Nationalist attacks. The brigade was further devastated on 11 March in bloody combats that followed in the Escatrón and Caspe area.

The result of all these combat actions foisted on the ill-prepared brigade was the almost total dispersion of the unit, with only a much battered battalion remaining in the area between Pertusa and Monzón, another between Fraga and the Ebro River and the remainder engaged in the Defence of Lleida. The brigade had been shattered in such manner that it was no longer possible to reestablish it and it was terminated in March 1938.

=== Latter unit: Catalonia ===
On 19 April the number 224 was revived and assigned to a new mixed brigade hastily formed with new battalions that had formerly belonged to the 124th Mixed Brigade. The new unit was assigned to the 60th Division of the XVIII Army Corps at Vallfogona. The commander was Militia Major Antonio Moya Gabarrón, and the chief of staff commander was Militia Captain Benito García Freixas.

The new unit took part in the Battle of the Ebro, arriving to the frontline area on 30 July as reserve of the XV Army Corps in the Fayón-Vilalba dels Arcs sector. As stated in a rebel military report based on deserters from this Republican Army unit —while at the Second Gandesa front in Vilalba dels Arcs— unusual measures were taken in order to avoid desertions in the newly reorganized 224th Mixed Brigade.

... The morale in the 224th Mixed Brigade is very low judging from the high number of those who have escaped. Those engaged in spying for the eavesdropping service (servicio de escucha), as reported in the Brigade’s notice, are being watched by the squadron corporal, who is closely watched by a patrol of the Socialist Party composed of two individuals, these patrols are in turn watched by the brigade’s commissar and his helper. This service has been established about two days ago.

On 3 August the 224th Mixed Brigade relieved the troops of the 16th Division in the line between La Pobla de Massaluca and Cuatro Caminos. By 19 August it was caught up in the heavy combats of the Vilalba-Corbera-Vértice Gaeta triangle where it held its positions without giving way for eight days. Between 9 and 12 September the brigade was relieved by forces of the 42nd Division, while they were on their way to cover the left bank of the lower Ebro River.

On 4 December the 224th Mixed Brigade was sent to Ivars d'Urgell in order to defend the bridgehead at Balaguer. In the combats that ensued it suffered many casualties, for the rebels were initiating the Catalonia Offensive with numerous well-equipped units and their advance was unstoppable. Its hasty retreat led the battered 224th Mixed Brigade northeastwards across Catalonia, to Cervera, Calaf, Manresa and Vic, from were a few of its remaining survivors managed to cross the French border around January 1939.

== See also ==
- Mixed Brigades
- Battle of the Segre
