= 82nd Mixed Brigade =

- 82.ª Brigada Mixta
- Active: March 1937 – March 1939
- Country: Spanish Republic
- Allegiance: Republican faction
- Branch: Spanish Republican Army
- Type: Infantry
- Size: Brigade
- Engagements: Spanish Civil War

The 82nd Mixed Brigade was a unit of the Spanish Republican Army created during the Spanish Civil War. It came to operate on the Teruel and Levante fronts.

== History ==
The unit was created in March 1937 in the eastern sector of the Teruel front, employing a battalion of the POUM, anarchist militiamen of the First Confederal Column and regular troops. (Note: Some sources indicate that it was formed from anarchist militias, from the 2nd Confederal Column of the Levante and/or from the Iron Column.) For the leadership of the brigade, the infantry commander Rafael Blasco Borreguero, (Note: Other authors, however, point out that command of the unit fell to David Alfaro Siqueiros, famous Mexican muralist.) while Gabriel Rodríguez Cabezas was appointed chief of staff; Melecio Álvarez Garrido was appointed as commissar. The Brigade was assigned to the 40th Division of the 13th Army Corps. On 11 July, the 82nd MB participated in the Battle of Albarracín, in support of the attack undertaken by the 61st Mixed Brigade.

At the end of December 1937 the brigade participated in the Battle of Teruel. On 14 December it attacked the nationalist positions in the Port of Escandón —which it managed to cross on the 16 December—, continuing its advance towards Teruel along the Sagunto highway, occupying the towns of Castellar and Castralvo. On 22 December, after eliminating the nationalist resistance in El Mansueto, the brigade took the San Julián neighborhood and the railway station by storm; On the afternoon of the same day, it also took over the Fuente del Torico. One 1 January 1938, having abruptly withdrawn from their positions, the brigade returned to the city to continue the siege. The remains of the Teruel garrison ended up capitulating on 8 January, with which the city was definitively in Republican hands.

During the Battle of Alfambra the unit had a highly disputed performance in the defense of Sierra Palomera, which it lost to the enemy offensive. Furthermore, in its retreat the 82nd Mixed Brigade suffered so many casualties that in the end, when it reorganized in the rear, its size had been reduced to just one battalion.

The unit was later assigned to the 64th Division of the 14th Army Corps, and fought on the Levante front. At the end of operations – after the beginning of the Battle of the Ebro — the 82nd MB became part of the 5th Division, the unit with which it remained until the end of the war.

== Command ==
Commanders

- Rafael Blasco Borreguero;
- José García López;
- Fernando Cortacáns del Cerro

Commissars

- Melecio Álvarez Garrido

Chiefs of Staff

- Gabriel Rodríguez Cabezas;
- Fernando Cortacáns del Cerro

== See also ==
- First Confederal Column
- Mixed Brigades

== Bibliography ==
- Álvarez, Santiago (1989). Los comisarios políticos en el Ejército Popular de la República (in Spanish). Ediciós do Castro.
- Cabezas, Octavio (2005). Indalecio Prieto, socialista y español (in Spanish). Algaba Ediciones. ISBN 9788496107458.
- Casanova, Ester (2008). La violencia política en la retaguardia republicana de Teruel durante la guerra civil (in Spanish). Instituto de Estudios Turolenses.
- Corral, Pedro (2005). Si me quieres escribir. La batalla de Teruel (in Spanish). DeBolsillo. ISBN 84-9793-626-4.
- Engel, Carlos (1999). Historia de las Brigadas Mixtas del Ejército Popular de la República (in Spanish). Madrid: Almena. ISBN 84-922644-7-0.
- González, Javier (2016). Guerra, exilio y muerte de Aurelio Arteta (1936-1940) (in Spanish). Sevilla: Punto Rojo Libros.
- Mainar, Eladi (1998). De milicians a soldats. Les columnes valencianes en la Guerra Civil Espanyola (1936–1939) (in Catalan). Universidad de Valencia. ISBN 84-370-3349-7.
- Martínez, Rogelio; Gómez, Roberto (1999). Crónica del exilio español en Uruguay II (in Spanish). Editorial J. Bergamin.
