= 92nd Mixed Brigade =

Military unit in the Spanish Civil War

- 92.ª Brigada Mixta
- Active: March 1937–March 1939
- Country: Spain
- Allegiance: (Second Spanish Republic) Republican faction
- Branch: Spanish Republican Army
- Type: Infantry
- Size: Brigade
- Garrison/HQ: Andújar
- Engagements: Spanish Civil War: Battle of Teruel

Commanders
- Notable commanders: Carlos García Vallejo; Tomás Centeno

The 92nd Mixed Brigade was a unit of the Spanish Republican Army created during the Spanish Civil War. It came to operate on the fronts of Andalusia, Teruel, Levante and Extremadura, having an outstanding performance during the conflict.

== History ==
The unit was created in March 1937, in Andújar, from three battalions of militias. Although at first it used the numbering "75", it was later renumbered as "92". The command was entrusted to the infantry commander Carlos García Vallejo, that throughout 1937 was replaced by the infantry commanders Antonio Máximo Ludeña, Nicolás Bellido Borrás and Celestino García-Miranda. Shortly after its creation, in April, the brigade was assigned to the 20th Division, having its headquarters in Andújar.

The 92nd Mixed Brigade remained located in the Córdoba front until the beginning of December 1937, when it was sent to the Teruel front and added to the 70th Division of the XVIII Army Corps. On 16 December it saw action in the Campillo sector, participating in the Battle of Teruel. In February 1938, it was located in front of the Alfambra river, where its units distinguished themselves with unequal luck: located in the Vertice, one of its battalions withdrew in disarray due to the danger of encirclement, while its 367th battalion maintained their positions harshly.

== Command ==
Commanders

- Infantry Commander Carlos García Vallejo;
- Infantry Commander Antonio Máximo Ludeña;
- Infantry Commander Nicolás Bellido Borrás;
- Infantry Commander Celestino García-Miranda;
- Militia Major Tomás Centeno Sierra;

Commissars

- Fernando Alloza Villagrasa;
- Melecio Álvarez Garrido, of the CNT;
- Diego Pastor Alonso, of the PCE;

== Bibliography ==
- Álvarez, Santiago (1989). Los comisarios políticos en el Ejército Popular de la República (in Spanish). Ediciós do Castro.
- Engel, Carlos (1999). Historia de las Brigadas Mixtas del Ejército Popular de la República (in Spanish). Madrid: Almena. ISBN 84-922644-7-0.
- Martínez Cobo, Carlos; Martínez Cobo, José (1989). ¿República? ¿Monarquía? En Busca del Consenso. Intrahistoria del PSOE Vol. 2 (1946-1954) (in Spanish). Plaza & Janés.
- Moreno Gómez, Francisco (1985). La Guerra civil en Córdoba (1936-1939) (in Spanish). Córdoba: Alpuerto.
- Zaragoza, Cristóbal (1983). Ejército Popular y Militares de la República, 1936-1939 (in Spanish). Barcelona: Ed. Planeta.
