= Cinco Olivas =

- municipality
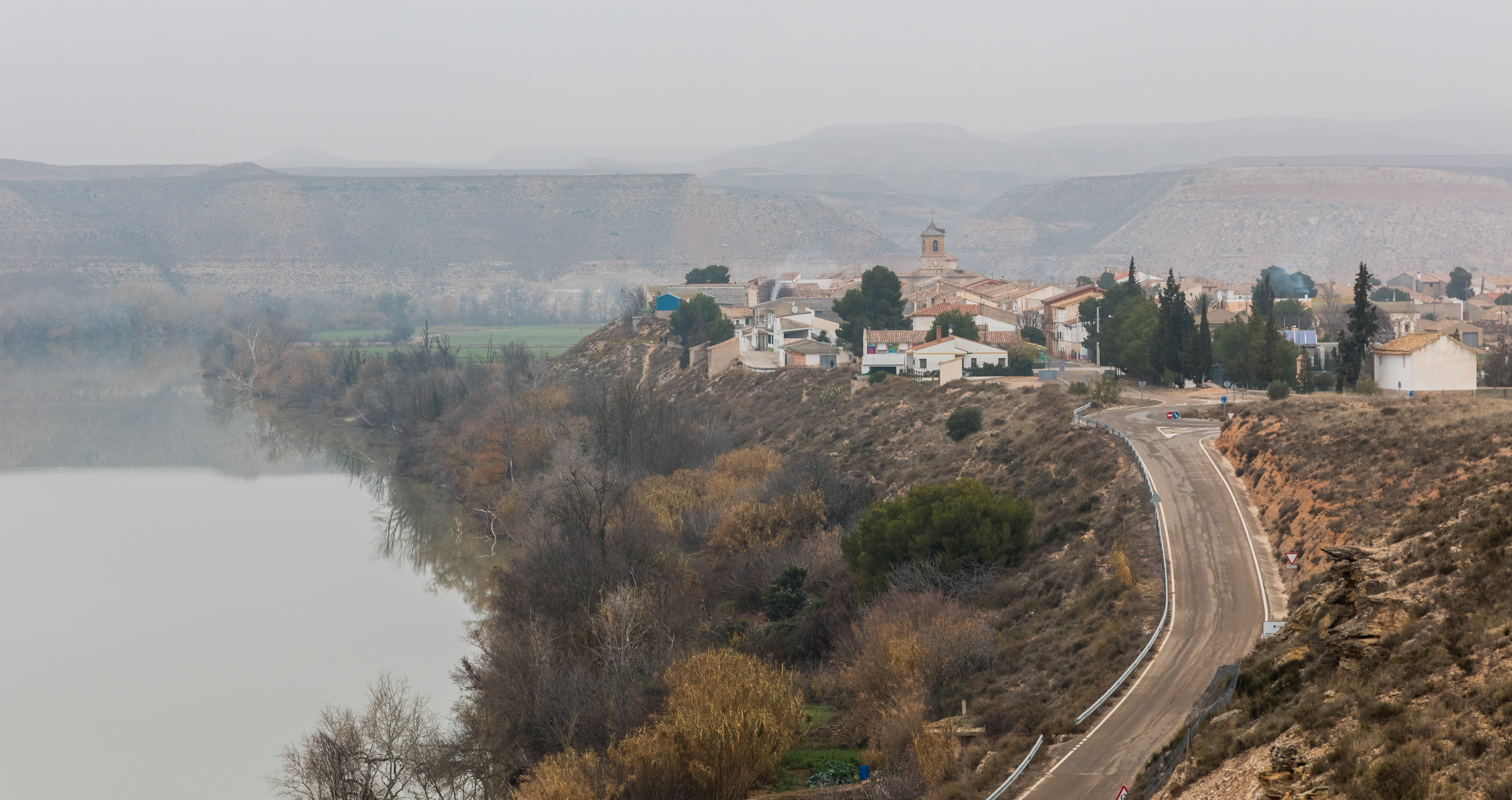

- Flag Coat of arms

- Location within Aragon Location within Spain Location within Europe
- Country: Spain
- Autonomous community: Aragon
- Province: Zaragoza
- Municipality: Cinco Olivas

Area
  - Total: 2 km^{2} (0.77 sq mi)
- Elevation: 161 m (528 ft)

Population (2025-01-01)
  - Total: 97
  - Density: 49/km^{2} (130/sq mi)
- Time zone: UTC+1 (CET)
  - Summer (DST): UTC+2 (CEST)

Cinco Olivas is a municipality located in the province of Zaragoza, Aragon, Spain. According to the 2009 census (INE), the municipality has a population of 118 inhabitants.

== See also ==
- Ribera Baja del Ebro
- List of municipalities in Zaragoza
