= 94th Mixed Brigade =

- 94.ª Brigada Mixta
- Active: September 1937 - February 1939
- Country: Spanish Republic
- Allegiance: Republican faction
- Branch: Spanish Republican Army
- Type: Marines
- Size: Brigade
- Garrison/HQ: Jódar
- Engagements: Spanish Civil War

Commanders
- Notable commanders: Ginés Sánchez Balibrea

The 94th Mixed Brigade was a unit of the Spanish Republican Army created during the Spanish Civil War. It came to operate on the Teruel, Aragon and Segre fronts.

== History ==
In March 1937, in Cuenca, the 94th Mixed Brigade was created, made up of recruits from the loyalist Quintos, and with remains of the old Iberia Column. The command of this unit was entrusted to the infantry commander José Ramos Chiva. The 94th MB was sent to the Battle of Brunete, although it did not participate. A few months later the unit was dissolved and dispersed.

In September 1937, the brigade was reformed in Cartagena with marine infantry forces, under the command of Ginés Sánchez Balibrea. It was placed in the 34th Division and, later, in the 72nd Division - both divisions of 18th Army Corps. Initially it had its headquarters in Jódar, where it remained until it was called to participate in the Battle of Teruel (integrated into the 34th Division).

During the Battle of Teruel, the unit played a prominent role both in the fighting in La Muela and in the taking of the city. In February 1938, the unit fought in the Battle of Alfambra. Two days later it joined the Perea Group, taking part in a failed counterattack against the nationalist advance. During all these operations the unit suffered severe wear and tear, for which it was withdrawn to Madrid, where it enjoyed a short period of rest. It was subjected to a reorganization and was reinforced with troops from the 95th Mixed Brigade, which would in fact be merged with the 94th Mixed Brigade.

After the beginning of the Aragon Offensive, it was sent as reinforcement to the north of the Ebro. Around this time it became briefly integrated into the 70th Division. On April 18, the 94th MB was located in Sort, integrated into the 34th Division; the next day it was assigned to the 56th Division, in Castellciutat. The nationalist offensive caused the unit to be cornered in the Pyrenean area. However, when the nationalist attack was halted, at the end of April the 94th BM participated in the Republican assault on the nationalist bridgehead of Seròs, on the Segre River. To do this, the unit attacked the Peñas de Aolo in the Sierra de Pobo, without success. The fighting lasted until the beginning of May. For its performance in the fighting, the brigade was awarded the Medal of Valor.

By then the unit was assigned to the 34th Division of the 10th Army Corps.

On June 9, the unit crossed the Segre River through the Vilanova de la Barca area with the intention of establishing a bridgehead, an attempt that would end in failure. A few months later, in October, command of the unit passed to the commander Isidoro Fernández González. In December 1938 it was located in front of the Segre, having to face the new Catalonia offensive; Despite the resistance offered, it had to withdraw from its positions. It would continue to withdraw to the French border.

== Command ==
Commanders

- Ginés Sánchez Balibrea;
- Isidoro Fernández González

Commissars

- Evaristo Torralba García

Chiefs of Staff

- Julio Pastoriza Díaz

== See also ==
- Iberia Column
- Mixed Brigades

== Bibliography ==
- Alpert, Michael (1989). El ejército republicano en la guerra civil (in Spanish). Siglo XXI Editores.
- Engel, Carlos (1999). Historia de las Brigadas Mixtas del Ejército Popular de la República (in Spanish). Madrid: Almena. ISBN 84-922644-7-0.
- Maldonado, José M.ª (2007). El frente de Aragón. La Guerra Civil en Aragón (1936–1938) (in Spanish). Mira Editores. ISBN 978-84-8465-237-3.
- Martínez Bande, José Manuel (1975). La llegada al mar (in Spanish). Madrid: Editorial San Martín.
- Martínez Bande, José Manuel (1978). La Batalla del Ebro (in Spanish). Madrid: San Martín.
- Rojas, Carlos (1980). La guerra en Catalunya (in Spanish). Plaza & Janés.
- Téllez, Antonio (1996). La Red de Evasión del Grupo Ponzán. Anarquistas en la guerra secreta contra el franquismo y el nazismo (1936-1944) (in Spanish). Barcelona: Editorial Virus.
