= La Zaida =

- municipality
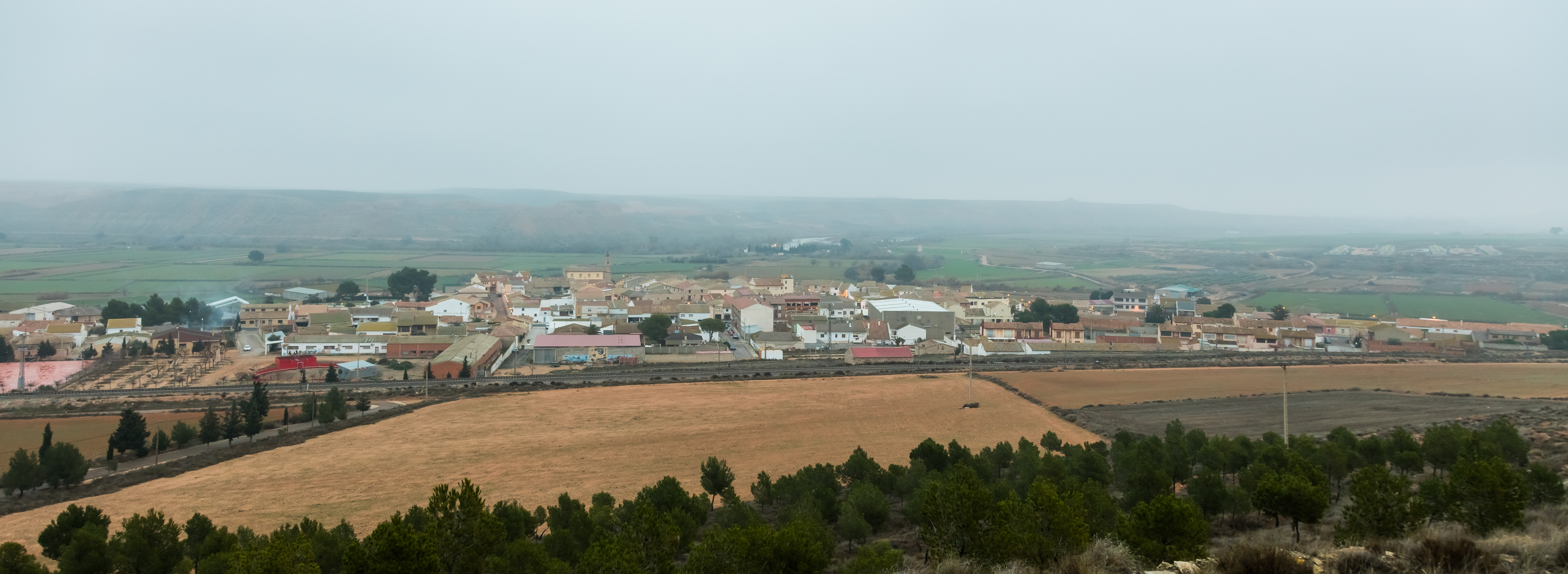

- Flag Coat of arms

- Location within Aragon Location within Spain Location within Europe
- Country: Spain
- Autonomous community: Aragon
- Province: Zaragoza

Area
  - Total: 17.36 km^{2} (6.70 sq mi)
- Elevation: 156 m (512 ft)

Population (2025-01-01)
  - Total: 433
  - Density: 24.9/km^{2} (64.6/sq mi)
- Time zone: UTC+1 (CET)
  - Summer (DST): UTC+2 (CEST)

La Zaida is a municipality located in the province of Zaragoza, Aragon, Spain. According to the 2009 census (INE), the municipality has a population of 534 inhabitants.

== See also ==
- Ribera Baja del Ebro
- List of municipalities in Zaragoza
