= Velilla de Ebro =

Coordinates: 41°22′N 0°26′W

- municipality
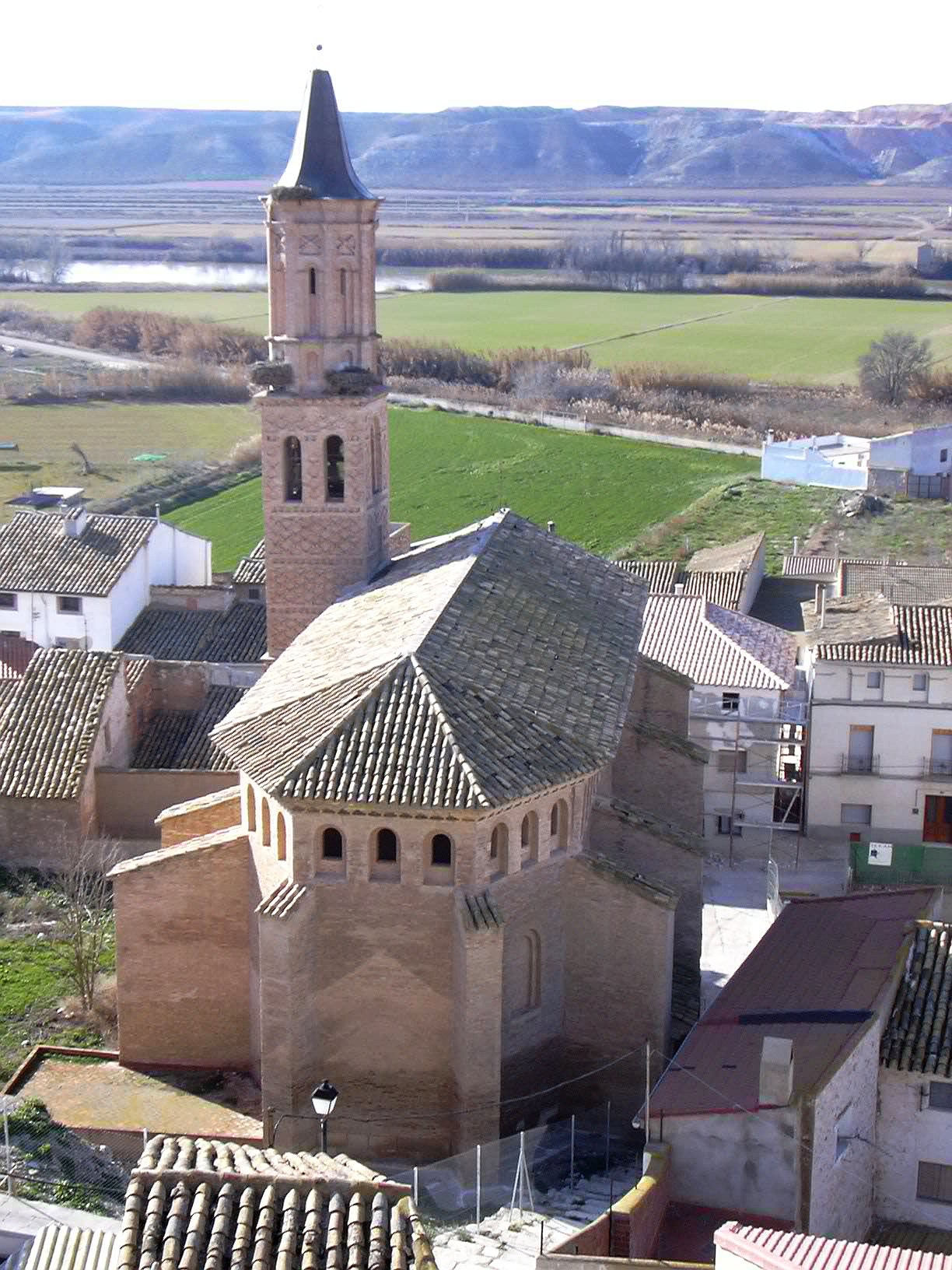

- Flag Coat of arms
- Interactive map of Velilla de Ebro
- Country: Spain
- Autonomous community: Aragon
- Province: Zaragoza

Area
  - Total: 59 km^{2} (23 sq mi)
- Elevation: 152 m (499 ft)

Population (2025-01-01)
  - Total: 208
  - Density: 3.5/km^{2} (9.1/sq mi)
- Time zone: UTC+1 (CET)
  - Summer (DST): UTC+2 (CEST)

Velilla de Ebro is a municipality located in the Zaragoza Province, Aragon, Spain. According to the 2009 census (INE), the municipality has a population of 261 inhabitants.

This town is located close to the Purburell or Pui Burell mountain.

== See also ==
- Ribera Baja del Ebro
- List of municipalities in Zaragoza
