= 72nd Division (Spain) =

- 72.ª División
- Active: 23 September 1937 – 11 March 1938; 19 April 1938 – February 1939
- Country: Spanish Republic
- Allegiance: (Second Spanish Republic) Republican faction
- Branch: Spanish Republican Army
- Type: Infantry
- Size: Division
- Part of: XVIII Army Corps
- Engagements: Spanish Civil War: Aragon Offensive; Balaguer Offensive; Catalonia Offensive

The 72nd Division was one of the divisions of the Spanish Republican Army that were organized during the Spanish Civil War on the basis of the Mixed Brigades. It was present on the Aragón and Segre fronts.

== History ==
The division was created on September 23, 1937, being integrated into the XVIII Army Corps. Initially it grouped the 94th and 224th Mixed Brigades, recently created. In December 1937, the unit was sent to the Teruel sector, but it was so far behind in its organization that it did not intervene in the Battle of Teruel. It performed poorly during the Aragon Offensive, being seriously broken. In addition, its commander, José María Enciso Madolell, was taken prisoner by the nationalist forces. The 72nd Division was dissolved on March 11, 1938, and its remains were assigned to the Ebro Autonomous Group.

It was recreated again on April 19 of that year, within the XVIII Army Corps. At the end of May it participated in the Balaguer Offensive, in support of other units, (Note: The forces of the division acted in the area of the San Jordi de Mollé village, in support of units belonging to the Ebro Autonomous Group.) Although this offensive ended up failing. During the following months it remained in the rear, without taking part in military actions. At the beginning of the Catalonia Offensive the unit was overwhelmed by the advance of the nationalist 84th Division, in the Camarasa area. The resistance put up by the division was minimal, which led to the removal of its commander — Pascual Saura. After that, it retreated together with the rest of the XVIII Army Corps.

== Command ==
Commanders

- José María Enciso Madolell;
- Pascual Saura;
- Mariano Buxó Martín;

Commissioners

- Antonio Barea Arenas of the CNT;
- Ramón Estarelles Úbeda of the PCE;

== Order of battle ==
Date	Attached Army Corps	Integrated Mixed Brigades	Battle front
September 1937	XVIII Army Corps	94th and 224th	General reserve
February – March 1938	XVIII Army Corps	94th, 224th and 225th	Aragon
April 19, 1938	XVIII Army Corps	37th and 213th	Segre
April 30, 1938	XVIII Army Corps	38th, 93rd and 213th	Segre

== Bibliography ==
- Álvarez, Santiago (1989). Los comisarios políticos en el Ejército Popular de la República (in Spanish). Ediciós do Castro.
- Encinas Moral, Ángel Luis (2008). Fuentes históricas para el estudio de la emigración española a la U.R.S.S. (1936-2007) (in Spanish). Madrid: Exterior XXI.
- Engel, Carlos (1999). Historia de las Brigadas Mixtas del Ejército Popular de la República (in Spanish). Madrid: Almena. ISBN 84-922644-7-0.
- Herrero Pérez, José Vicente (2017). The Spanish Military and Warfare from 1899 to the Civil War. Palgrave Macmillan.
- Martínez Bande, José Manuel (1975). La llegada al mar (in Spanish). Madrid: San Martín. ISBN 84-7140-115-0.
- Martínez Bande, José Manuel (1978). La Batalla del Ebro (in Spanish). Madrid: Ed. San Martín.
- Martínez Bande, José Manuel (1979). La Campaña de Cataluña (in Spanish). Madrid: Ed. San Martín.
- Salas Larrazábal, Ramón (2006). Historia del Ejército Popular de la República (in Spanish). La Esfera de los Libros. ISBN 84-9734-465-0.
- VV.AA. (1990). Historia general de España y América XVII. La segunda república y la guerra civil (in Spanish). Madrid: Ediciones Rialp.
- Zaragoza, Cristóbal (1983). Ejército Popular y Militares de la República, 1936-1939 (in Spanish). Barcelona: Ed. Planeta.
