= Melecio Álvarez Garrido =

Leonese anarcho-syndicalist

- Born: 21 March 1896; Villalpando, Zamora, León
- Died: 23 October 1940 (aged 44); Paterna, Valencia, Spain
- Cause of death: Execution by firing squad
- Military career
- Service: Confederal militias (1936-1937); Spanish Republican Army (1937-1939)
- Service years: 1936-1939
- Units: 82nd Mixed Brigade; 92nd Mixed Brigade
- Conflicts: Spanish Civil War

Melecio Álvarez Garrido (Villalpando, 21 March 1896 - Paterna, 23 October 1940) was a Leonese anarcho-syndicalist.

== Biography ==
A waiter by profession, he was affiliated with the National Confederation of Labor (CNT), forming part of the CNT Gastronomy Union in Valencia. During the period of the Second Spanish Republic he participated in various political activities. After the outbreak of the Spanish Civil War he joined the confederal militias, participating in the organization of an anarchist column. He was in favor of the militarization of the militias, openly opposing José Pellicer Gandía - founder of the Iron Column. Later he became part of the political commissariat of the People's Army of the Republic. During the war, he served as commissar of the 82nd and 92nd mixed brigades, fighting on various fronts. He was captured by the nationalists at the end of the war, He was shot in Paterna on 23 October 1940.

== Bibliography ==
- Álvarez, Santiago (1989). Los comisarios políticos en el Ejército Popular de la República (in Spanish). Ediciós do Castro.
- Engel, Carlos (1999). Historia de las Brigadas Mixtas del Ejército Popular de la República (in Spanish). Madrid: Almena. ISBN 84-922644-7-0.
- Gabarda Cebellán, Vicent (2007). Els afusellaments al País Valencià (1938-1956) (in Spanish). Universidad de Valencia.
