= Rillo =

- municipality
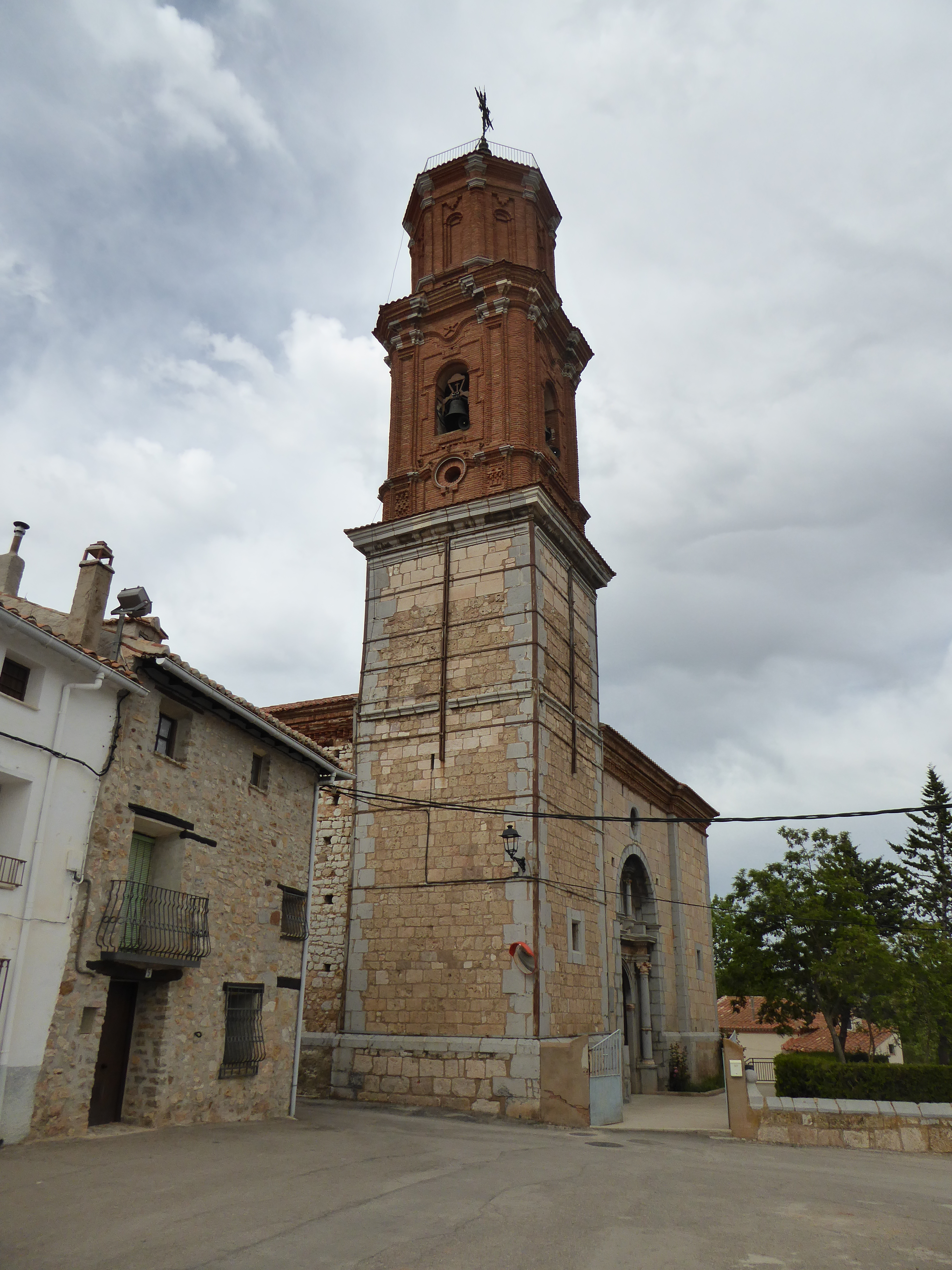

- Location within Spain
- Coordinates: 40°43′N 1°0′W
- Country: Spain
- Autonomous community: Aragon
- Province: Teruel
- Municipality: Rillo

Area
  - Total: 53 km^{2} (20 sq mi)

Population (2025-01-01)
  - Total: 95
  - Density: 1.8/km^{2} (4.6/sq mi)
- Time zone: UTC+1 (CET)
  - Summer (DST): UTC+2 (CEST)

Rillo is a municipality located in the province of Teruel, Aragon, Spain. According to the 2004 census (INE), the municipality has a population of 125 inhabitants.

== See also ==
- List of municipalities in Teruel
