= Balaguer Offensive =

Coordinates: 41°47′0″N 0°49′30″E

- Part of the Spanish Civil War
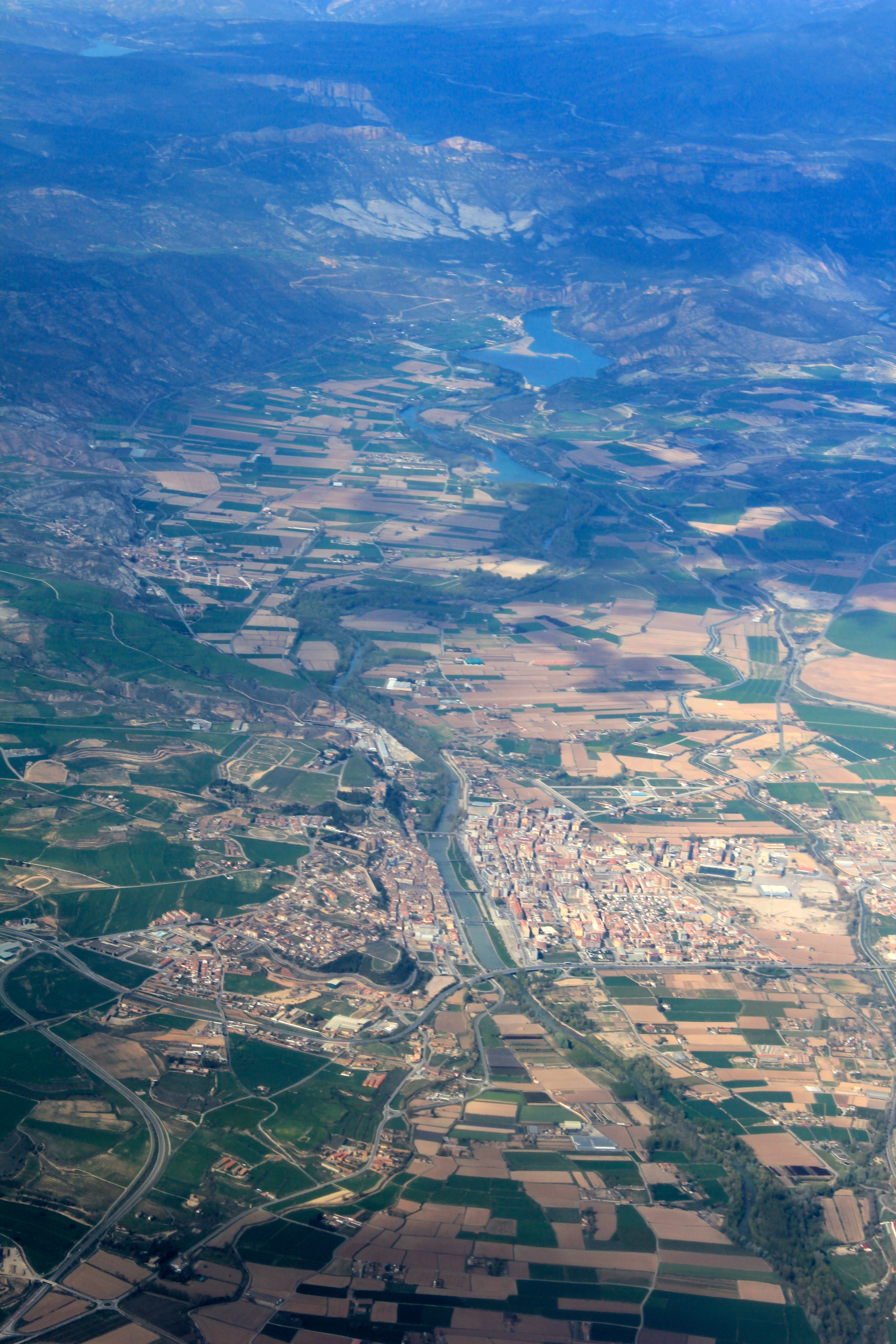
- Aerial view of Balaguer and the Segre River
Date	April & May 1938
Location	Bridgehead over the Segre, Catalonia
Result	Francoist victory

Belligerents
Spanish Republic	(Francoist Spain) Nationalist Spain

Casualties and losses
High	Moderate

The Balaguer Offensive was an offensive carried out by the Spanish Republican Army around Balaguer, Catalonia, during the Spanish Civil War. The offensive consisted in a series of counterattacks in the spring and summer of 1938 after the disastrous Aragon Offensive. The offensive was a failure for the Spanish Republic and many lives and military material were wasted.

== History ==
The offensive was planned by General Vicente Rojo Lluch as a morale-lifting counterattack by Republican military units after the defeats suffered at the Aragon fronts. Historically this battle was part of the longer Battle of the Segre.

The town of Balaguer had fallen in the hands of the rebel faction in a series of vehement surprise attacks between 5 and 6 April 1938, following which the Francoist armies captured the strategic bridge over the Segre River on 10 April when the Republican Army withdrew to the other side of the river.

In order to retake at least the bridgehead of the left bank the 27th, 60th and 72nd divisions of the XVIII Army Corps of the Spanish Republic counterattacked between the 12 and the 15 April. The Republican soldiers however, were mostly very young men – some only 17 years old, hastily recruited and ill-trained – who, despite their enthusiasm, were not successful. Again, another series of efforts to reconquer the Balaguer bridgehead took place between 22 and 29 May, but these were again fruitless and the Republican units had to withdraw in the face of the overwhelming superiority of the enemy, leaving many casualties behind.

=== Last effort ===
After almost three months, together with the wider Republican offensive of the Battle of the Ebro, there was again a series of combats to retake the bridgehead at Balaguer. The attacks were made between 9 and 11 August but the Republican forces were defeated again, being smashed against the superior firepower of the rebel lines.

== See also ==
- Battle of the Segre
- Eastern Region Army Group
- List of Spanish Nationalist military equipment of the Spanish Civil War
- List of Spanish Republican military equipment of the Spanish Civil War
