= Almuradiel =

Municipality of Spain

Coordinates: 38°30′47″N 3°29′49″W

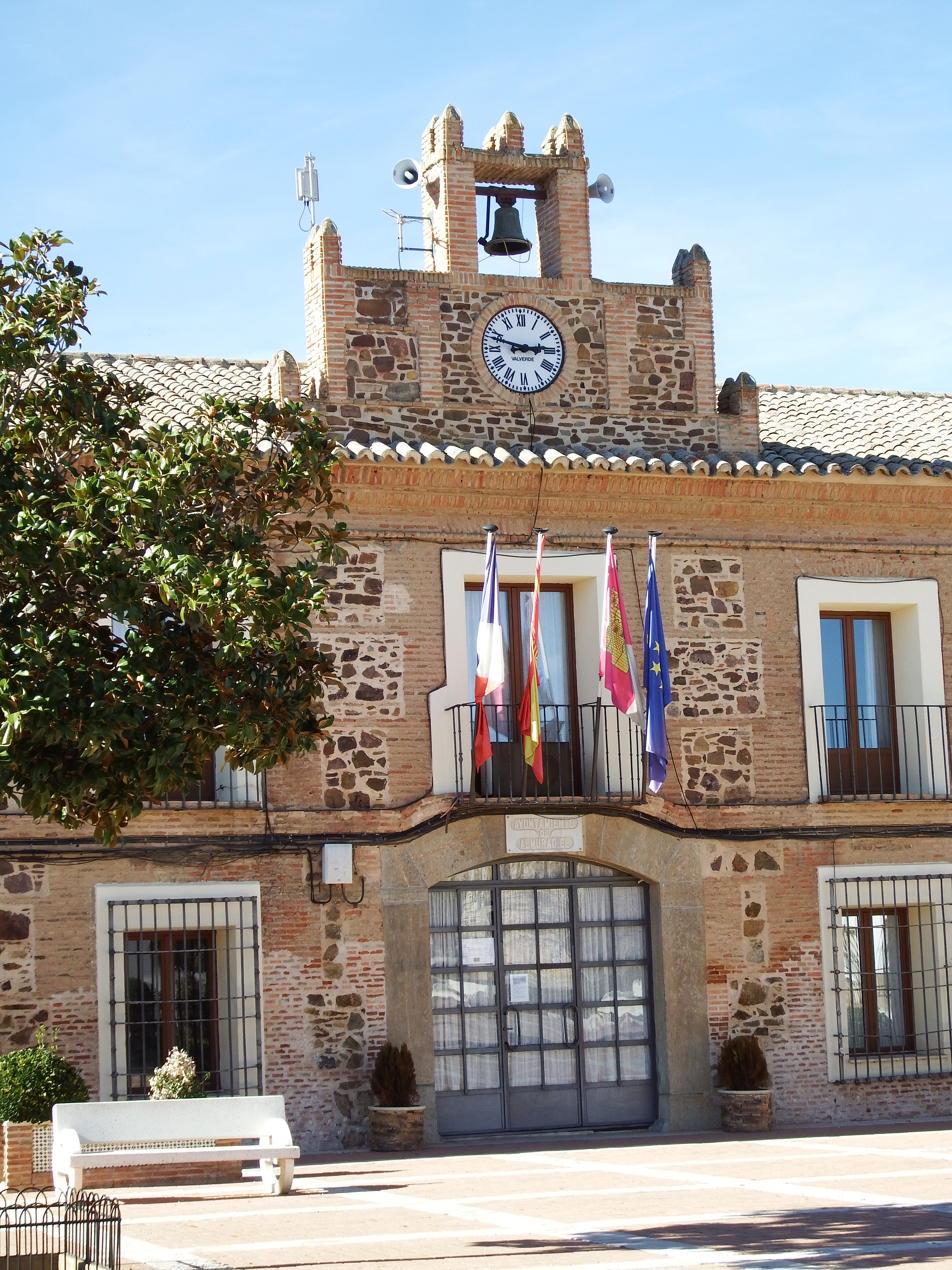
Town Hall of Almuradiel, Ciudad Real

Flag of Almuradiel

Coat of arms of Almuradiel

Almuradiel is a municipality in Ciudad Real, Castile-La Mancha, Spain. It has a population of 965.

It is near the site of the first attack during the Peninsula War, when two squadrons of French dragoons were attacked at the northern entrance to the pass, and forced to retreat to the town.
