= Gelsa =

- municipality
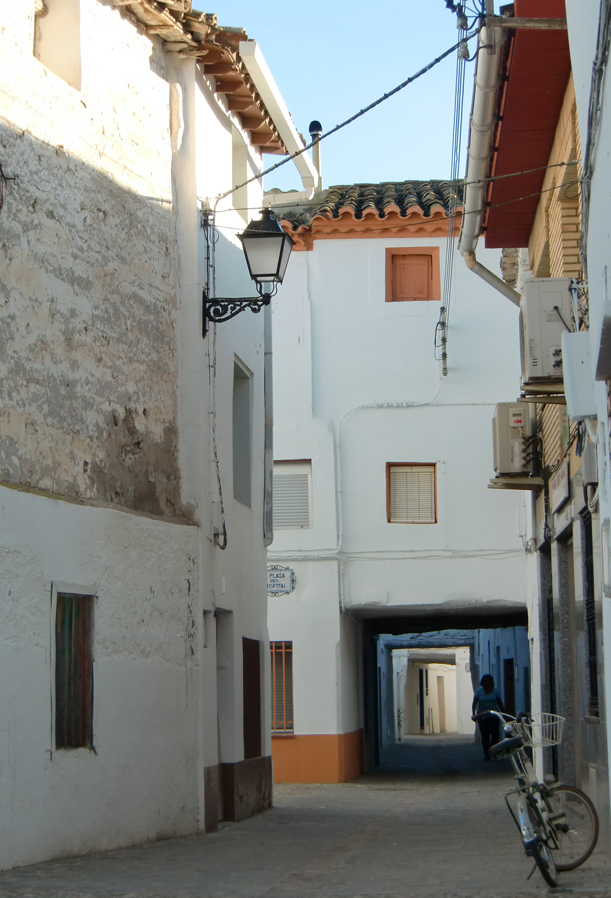

- Flag Coat of arms

- Location within Aragon Location within Spain Location within Europe
- Country: Spain
- Autonomous community: Aragon
- Province: Zaragoza

Area
  - Total: 72 km^{2} (28 sq mi)

Population (2025-01-01)
  - Total: 996
  - Density: 14/km^{2} (36/sq mi)
- Time zone: UTC+1 (CET)
  - Summer (DST): UTC+2 (CEST)

Gelsa is a municipality located in the province of Zaragoza, comarca (county) of Ribera Baja del Ebro, Aragon, Spain. According to the 2004 census (INE), the municipality has a population of 1,216 inhabitants.

== See also ==
- List of municipalities in Zaragoza
