= Sástago =

Coordinates: 41°19′N 0°21′W

Sástago, Spain
- Coat of arms
- Interactive map of Sástago, Spain
- Country: Spain
- Autonomous community: Aragon
- Province: Zaragoza
- Municipality: Sástago

Area
  - Total: 301 km^{2} (116 sq mi)

Population (2025-01-01)
  - Total: 1,067
  - Density: 3.54/km^{2} (9.18/sq mi)
- Time zone: UTC+1 (CET)
  - Summer (DST): UTC+2 (CEST)

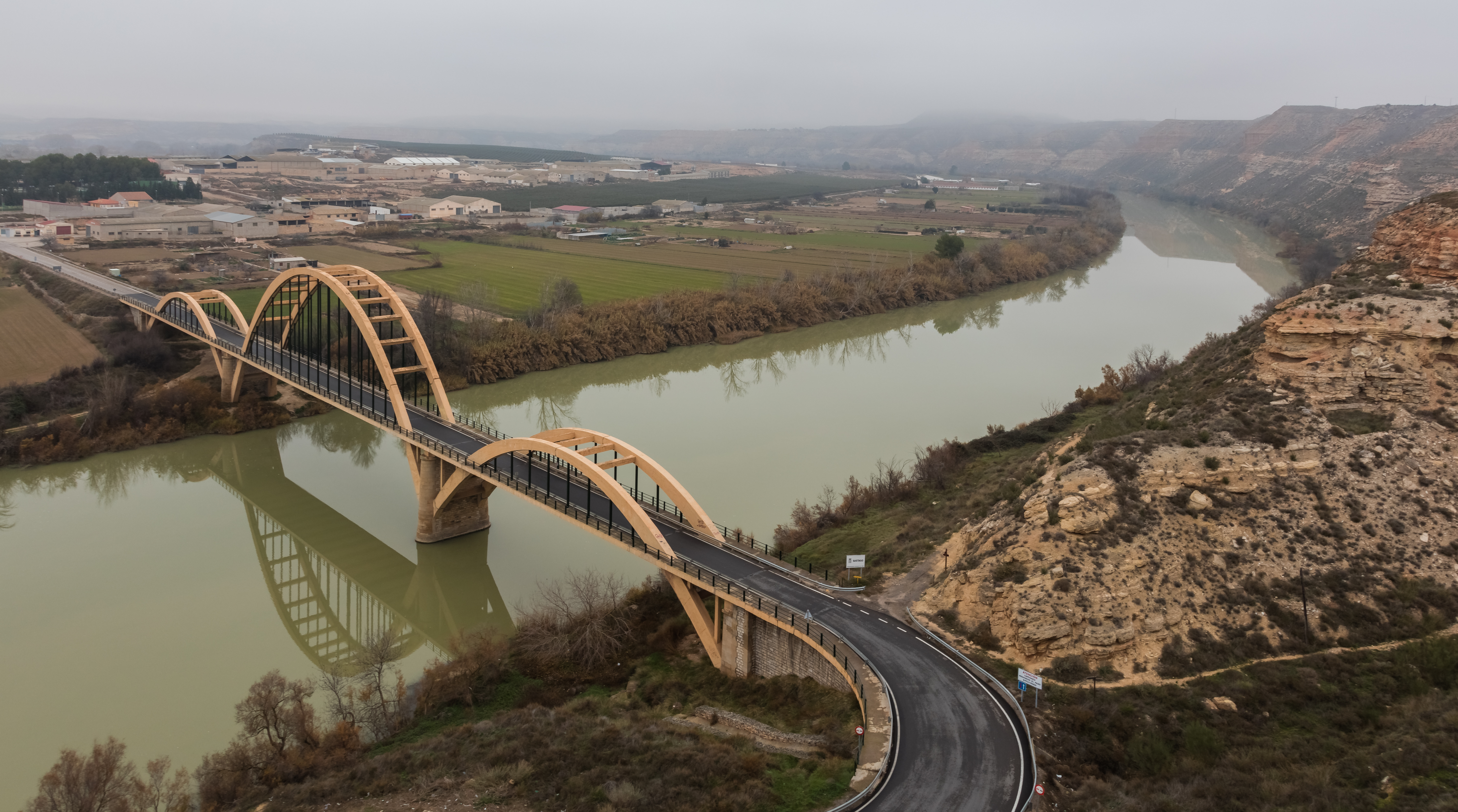
View of Sastago and the bridge over the Ebro river.

Sástago is a municipality located in the province of Zaragoza, Aragon, Spain. According to the 2004 census (INE), the municipality has a population of 1,307 inhabitants.

== See also ==
- List of municipalities in Zaragoza
