= Escatrón =

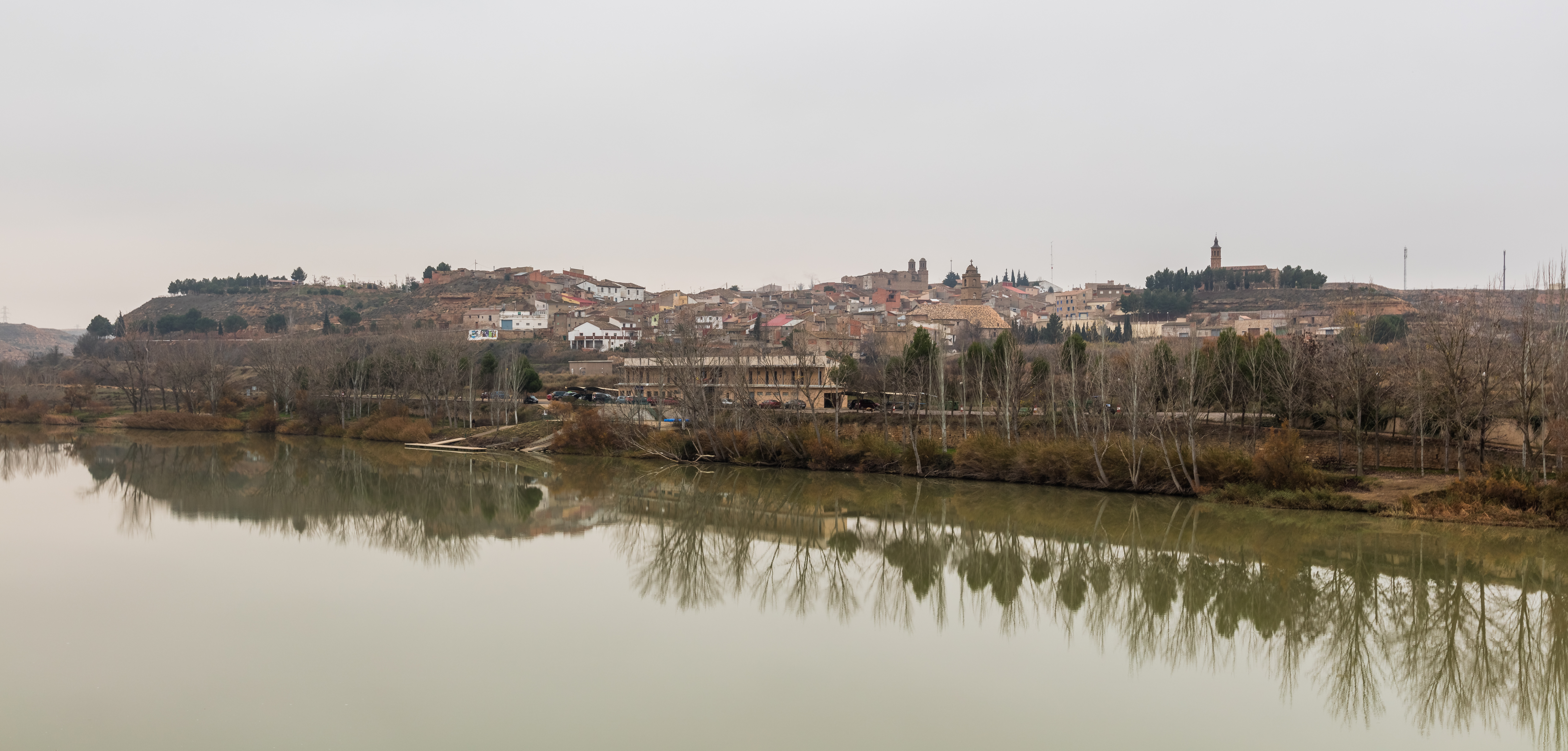

- Flag Coat of arms

- Location within Aragon Location within Spain Location within Europe
- Country: Spain
- Autonomous community: Aragon
- Province: Zaragoza
- Municipality: Escatrón

Area
  - Total: 95 km^{2} (37 sq mi)
- Elevation: 140 m (460 ft)

Population (2025-01-01)
  - Total: 1,189
  - Density: 13/km^{2} (32/sq mi)
- Time zone: UTC+1 (CET)
  - Summer (DST): UTC+2 (CEST)

Escatrón is a municipality located in the Ribera Baja del Ebro comarca, province of Zaragoza, Aragon, Spain. According to the 2009 census (INE), the municipality has a population of 1,163 inhabitants.

== See also ==
- Ribera Baja del Ebro
- List of municipalities in Zaragoza
