= 35th Division (Spain) =

35th Division (35th International Division) 35.ª División
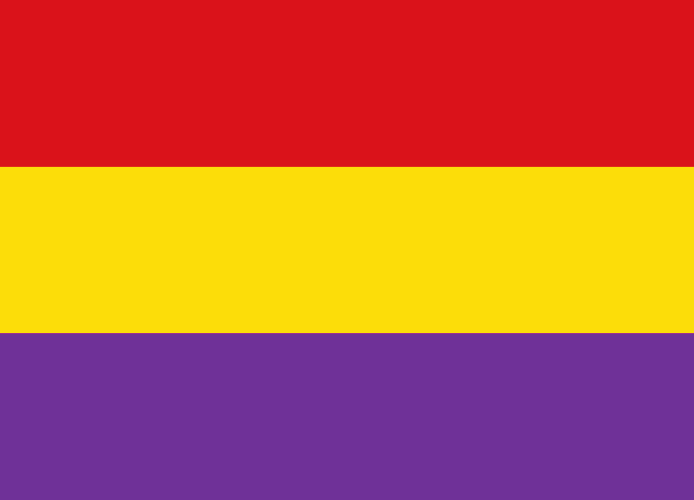
- Military flag of the Popular Army
- Active: 1937–1939
- Country: Spain
- Branch: Spanish Republican Army
- Type: Infantry division
- Role: Home Defence
- Part of: 5th Army Corps (1937 and 1938); 1st Army Corps (1937); 15th Army Corps (1938)
- Garrison/HQ: Albacete
- Nickname: "35.ª División Internacional"
- Engagements: Spanish Civil War: Battle of Brunete; Battle of Teruel; Battle of the Ebro

Commanders
- Notable commanders: Karol Świerczewski (General Walter); Pedro Mateo Merino

Flag of the International Brigades.

Map of Spain in November 1938. In pink the two regions under Republican control.

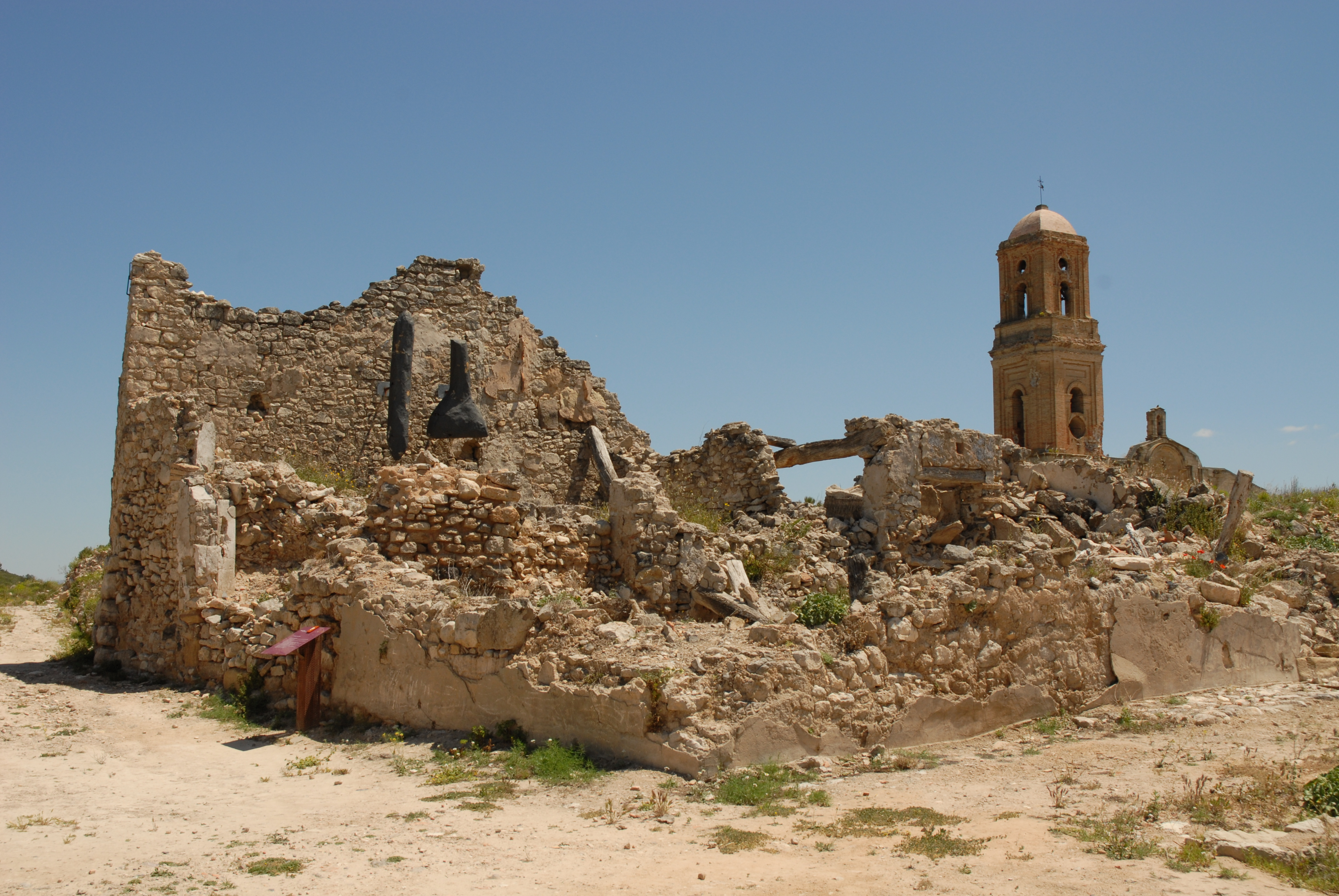
Ruins of Corbera d'Ebre, a part of the town that has been kept as a memorial to the many Republican fighters who lost their lives there.

The 35th Division (Spanish: 35.ª División) was a division of the Spanish Republican Army in the Spanish Civil War.

This unit was established in March 1937 in order to gather certain scattered units of the International Brigades under one command, therefore it was also known as the 35th International Division (35.ª División Internacional). It took part in some of the major battles of the conflict such as Brunete, Teruel and the Battle of the Ebro persistently being afflicted by numerous casualties, especially in the latter.

== History ==
The 35th Division was established on 23 March 1937 with the XII and XIV International Brigades and the 69th Mixed Brigade, becoming part of the 5th Army Corps. The command of the division was entrusted to Karol Świerczewski, also known as "General Walter", and the Chief of Staff was Lt. Colonel Ludwig Renn, a renowned German Communist.

It took part in the Segovia Offensive towards the end of May together with the 34th Division led by José María Galán. The combats were led by "General Walter" but ended up in complete failure, both divisions taking a high number of casualties. One month later the division took part in the Battle of Brunete where it was unable to fulfill its targets ending up again with many casualties, even though it fought well and was able to conquer a few positions.

=== At the Aragon Front ===
Towards the end of August the 35th Division was transferred to Aragon to take part in the Zaragoza Offensive together with the 11th Division. This would be one of the main battles of the Civil War. Both divisions were part of the Agrupación «D», which was under the leadership of Modesto and included cavalry and artillery sections, as well as Soviet-made tanks. The international units under "General Walter" soon took Codo town, where 300 fanatical Carlist troops holed up and put up a fierce fight against the two thousand attacking Republican soldiers. When the brigades entered Codo they saw a wall defaced with the words: "Por cada rojo que máteis, un año menos de purgatorio" (For every Red you kill, one year less in purgatory). Then the division moved on to nearby Belchite, a besieged town that doggedly resisted Republican attacks. The British and American troops of the XV International Brigade fought bravely from house to house, taking a high number of casualties among their ranks. The small town held until 7 September, when the Republican offensive lost steam without having been able to conquer the capital of Aragon further north. After three months of continuous combats the 35th Division was quite mangled and, following a brief attack on Fuentes de Ebro, it withdrew to the rearguard where it was given much needed reinforcement and new weapons. At that time the division was made up of the XI and XV International Brigades, as well as the 32nd Mixed Brigade.

At the end of December the division went to the Teruel Front in order to try to curb the Francoist counterattack which was threatening the small city which had been conquered by the Republicans at a high cost in human lives. At the beginning the 35th Division was assigned to the Reserve, but on 29 December it was called to check the rebel counterattack led by General Antonio Aranda. Unable to face the powerful enemy thrust the division had to withdraw to La Muela Hill, a position which it defended fiercely during the following few days until it moved down to the Singra sector. On 19 January General Walter's men put up a good fight during the bloody combats in the outskirts of Teruel, putting a check to the Francoist onslaught. Fighting in conditions of extreme cold, the hapless 35th Division suffered a huge number of fatalities during the Teruel campaign.

But all that effort would be in vain for on 7 March the rebel armies, after having reconquered Teruel, attacked all along the Aragon Front, breaching it in various places. The British, American and Canadian men of the XV International Brigade were the last to leave Belchite, by then a ruined place, which they had conquered at such high cost in human lives and materiel the previous summer. In the middle of the debacle General Vicente Rojo summoned the International Brigades to gather at Caspe in order to try to contain the relentless enemy advance. The 35th Division did its best to comply with the order, although its units were badly shattered, all having suffered heavy casualties and hardly being fit for combat. On 17 March, despite the international units putting up a brave resistance, Caspe fell to the enemy and the Republicans initiated a massive withdrawal towards Catalonia and the Levant.

=== Battle of the Ebro ===
At the beginning of April the 35th Division entered Catalonia where it would be cut off from the remaining Republican territory to the southwest when the rebels reached the Mediterranean shore at Vinaròs (north of Castellón Province). By mid May the division had been largely reorganized and a Spanish commander, Pedro Mateo Merino, was chosen to lead it. Also a new Commissar and a new Chief of Staff were named. The division became part of the 15th Army Corps led by Colonel Manuel Tagüeña and its brigades were reorganized, including a number of new Spanish recruits and officers in the XII, XIV and XV International Brigades. On the night of the 24 to 25 July the division crossed the Ebro River, signalling the beginning of the Battle of the Ebro, one of the major Republican offensives of the war. The first unit of the division that reached the left bank of the river was the Hans Beimler Battalion of the XI International Brigade. The division crossed at Ascó, north of Móra d'Ebre, evicting two Francoist battalions from their fortified positions, occupying La Fatarella and forcing the 50th Division of the rebel army to withdraw. It reached the Venta de Camposines, taking Corbera d'Ebre and the outskirts of Gandesa, becoming the Republican division that made the most spectacular advance in territory previously controlled by the rebels in the whole battle. On 6 August the 27th Division relieved the 35th Division and took over its positions at Vilalba dels Arcs, so that it could go to the rearguard for a well-deserved rest after nearly two weeks of uninterrupted combats. Barely a week later it went back to the frontline relieving the much-battered 11th Division on 15 August.

In order to satisfy the demands of the Non-Intervention Committee, the directive to withdraw the foreign members of the division arrived on 22 September. On that day the XV International Brigade took part in its last battle. In a similar manner as in August, the British battalion again suffered heavy losses. The division held its positions around Corbera until the fourth Francoist counteroffensive, when it was forced to move north by the rebel advance and had to cross back the Ebro east of Fayón by mid November, being the last Republican unit to withdraw. By then the international troops of the division had been withdrawn from the front and had been replaced by Spanish conscripts.

=== Twilight and end of the division ===
On 23 December the rebels began their Catalonia Offensive with a series of attacks along the Segre River. The V Army Corps led by Enrique Líster was swiftly sent to the area in order to try to plug the gap at the height of Borges Blanques. For an anguishing period of twelve days the last remnants of Republican elite troops in Catalonia were able to contain the fierce attacks of the Fascist Italians of the Corpo Truppe Volontarie (CTV), but on 5 January the loyalist resistance crumbled and there was a general debacle. Those left of the 35th Division withdrew alongside the Catalan coast northwards together with the remainder of the XV Army Corps. They passed through Barcelona and moved on with the relentless rebel advance at their heels until they reached the French border in the first days of February. Once in France the division was extinguished as the Republican soldiers were disarmed and interned in concentration camps by the French authorities.

== Order of Battle ==
| Date | Army Corps | Mixed Brigades | Battlefront |
|---|---|---|---|
| 25 March 1937 | 5th Army Corps | XII, XIV and 69th | General Reserve |
| May 1937 | 1st Army Corps | XIV and 69th | Guadarrama |
| July 1937 | 5th Army Corps | XIV, 108th and 32nd | Madrid |
| December 1937 | 5th Army Corps | XI, XV and 32nd | Zaragoza |
| February 1938 | 5th Army Corps | XI, XIII and XV | Teruel |
| March 1938 | 5th Army Corps | XI, XII, XIII, 139th and 213th | Aragon |
| 30 April 1938 | 15th Army Corps | XII, XIV and XV | Ebro |
| 23 December 1938 | 15th Army Corps | XI, XIII and XV | Ebro |

== Leaders ==
Commanders

- General Karol Świerczewski (General Walter);
- Militia Major Pedro Mateo Merino (since 1 May 1938)

Chiefs of Staff

- Lt. Colonel Ludwig Renn
- Militia Major Julián Henríquez Caubín (since 1 May 1938)

Commissars

- Julián Muñoz Lizcano, member of the Spanish Socialist Workers Party (PSOE) (since 7 March 1938);
- José María Sastre, member of the Spanish Communist Party (PCE) (since 1 May 1938)

== See also ==
- Mixed Brigades

== Bibliography ==
- Alpert, Michael (2013). The Republican Army in the Spanish Civil War, 1936–1939. Cambridge University Press. ISBN 978-1-107-32857-0.
- Álvarez, Santiago (1989). Los comisarios políticos en el Ejército Popular de la República. Ediciós do Castro.
- Engel Masoliver, Carlos (1999). Historia de las Brigadas mixtas del Ejército popular de la República, 1936-1939. Madrid: Editorial Almena. ISBN 84-96170-19-5.
- Salas Larrazábal, Ramón (2006). Historia del Ejército Popular de la República. La Esfera de los Libros S.L. ISBN 84-9734-465-0.
- Thomas, Hugh (1976). Historia de la Guerra Civil Española. Barcelona: Círculo de Lectores. ISBN 84-226-0874-X.
