= Vittorio Vidali =

Italian spy and politician

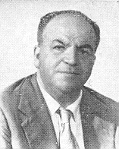
Vittorio Vidali

Vittorio Vidali (27 September 1900 – 9 November 1983), also known as Vittorio Vidale, Enea Sormenti, Jacobo Hurwitz Zender, Carlos Contreras, and "Comandante Carlos", was an Italian communist. After being expelled from Italy with the rise of Fascist Benito Mussolini, he went to Moscow, where he became an operative for the Soviet Comintern. He was exiled to Mexico, where he was implicated in assassination attempts of Cuban communist Julio Mella and Russian revolutionary Leon Trotsky. Later Vidali was active in Spain during its Civil War, and led the new communist party in the Free Territory of Trieste beginning in 1947 after World War II. He later represented the community in Parliament after it was annexed by Italy.

== Early life ==
He was born in the small coastal town of Muggia, then part of the county of Istria in the Austro-Hungarian Empire, and now part of Italy. As a teenager, he joined the socialist movement in the nearby port city of Trieste. At the age of twenty, Vidali is said to have been one of the founders of the Italian Communist Party.

In 1922, he was expelled from the country after Benito Mussolini ascended to power with the Fascist movement. Vidali was described as a Bolshevik in the file kept on him by the police in Fascist Italy.

== Comintern agent ==
Vidali found refuge in the Soviet Union, relocating to Moscow. Working for the International Red Aid, Vidali was sent by the Comintern to Mexico to discipline its national party, according to the Mexican Communist Party. During this period, Vidali became romantically involved with photographer and communist activist Tina Modotti, who had a previous liaison with artist Diego Rivera and was then involved with Cuban communist Julio Antonio Mella, then in Mexico.

=== Murder of Julio Mella ===
According to Gary Tennant, Vidali's interest in Modotti was related to his killing her current lover, Mella. Mella was among the founders of the Comintern version of the Communist Party of Cuba. He had fled Cuba for Mexico in Gerardo Machado’s time, where he joined and then left the Mexican Communist Party.

In early December 1928, Mella was expelled from the Mexican Communist Party for his association with Trotskyists, but he was readmitted two weeks later. Mella was killed by gunshot in Mexico City on 10 January 1929, an incident believed to have been a political assassination. Modotti was by Mella's side when he was shot. She was seen holding his arm, allegedly in a manner similar to her portrayal in Diego Rivera's mural of the three.

Vidali is believed to have used the revolver he commonly carried to murder Mella. Modotti was known to keep an M1911 pistol in her house.

Officially, José Agustín López (said to have no particular political affiliations) was charged with Mella's murder; two other known criminals, Jose Magriñat and Antonio Sanabria, were also suspects. Police investigators received conflicting eyewitness reports, which are notoriously unreliable. In one version, Mella and Modotti were walking alone, whereas another said that Vidali was walking together with the two. Mella was shot at point-blank range, and neither Modotti nor Vidali were injured. Modotti gave a false name to the investigators, and, although police were suspicious of her alibi, she was released soon after being arrested. Magriñat was also set free: he was ultimately killed in Cuba (allegedly by communists) in 1933.

The official position of the present Cuban government is that Mella was killed on Machado's orders. It acknowledges that Modotti was known to have been a Stalinist operative in a number of countries. Some in Cuba continue to believe that Vidali killed Mella.

== Spanish Civil War ==
Vidali was ordered to go to Spain, where he arrived in May 1936 under the pseudonym of Carlos Contreras. He led efforts to prepare, supervise and coordinate the Antifascist Worker and Peasant Militias (MAOC), organized by the Spanish Communist Party since 1934. This was before the Spanish Civil War broke out.

Because he had performed military training in the Soviet Frunze Academy, Vidali, and other comrades such as Enrique Líster, are credited with markedly improving the preparation of the militias. As a senior advisor for the Comintern in Spain, Vidali headed the 5th Regiment (Quinto Regimiento). It was responsible for the political formation of MAOC's regiments. In the 1937 pro-Republican propaganda film The Spanish Earth, Vidali was shown addressing an assembly of military personnel.

== In Mexico and Italy ==
Vidali returned to Mexico. He was identified as involved in the 24 May 1940 attack on Leon Trotsky's residence in Mexico City, a failed assassination attempt. Iosif Grigulevich, a Soviet NKVD operative, and Mexican painter David Alfaro Siqueiros were also involved in the assault. Vidali is also thought to have been closely involved with the successful infiltration of fellow NKVD operative Ramón Mercader into Trotsky's inner circle. This resulted in Mercader's murder of Trotsky later that year.

Vidali left Mexico in 1947.

Vittorio Vidali returned to Trieste in 1947 after World War II, when the Free Territory of Trieste was established. He soon became one of the most powerful members of the Communist Party there. In 1948, after the Tito–Stalin split, Vidali became the leader of the party and conducted a thorough purge of alleged Titoists in Trieste's Communist organizations. He also worked to reduce the influence of the KPJ on the Communist Party of the Free Territory of Trieste. He strengthened connections with pro-Soviet Italian Communists. During this period, he also clashed with the local Slovene minority that had been influential among Trieste's communists before his arrival. After 1954, when Trieste became part of Italy again, Vidali was elected to and served as a Communist Member of the Italian Parliament from the area.

== Reputation ==
Diego Rivera portrayed Vidali, Modotti, and Mella in his mural In the Arsenal. He included the figure of Tina Modotti holding a belt of ammunition on the right side of the mural. Vidali is shown staring over her shoulder and wearing a black hat. Modotti gazes lovingly at Julio Antonio Mella (shown with a light-coloured hat).

Reportedly Tina Modotti said to Valentín González in Spain, after he had decided not to kill Vidali, words to the effect: "You should have shot him, I hate him". But she continued: "I have to follow him until I die" (which she did).

The exploits of Vidali in carrying out Trotsky's assassination, and lethal purges of agents in the Soviet Union and Fulgencio Batista's Cuba (such as Sandalio Junco in the latter)) gained him attention. Julián Gorkin likened Vidali's activities, including known travels through Cuba before and after Fidel Castro's coming to power, and his presence in Turkey, Mexico, and Spain in relation to Soviet Communist activities to the far-flung exploits of British writer Ian Fleming's well-known MI-6 character in his James Bond series of novels.

Vidali has been called the "jaguar of Muggia."

== Bibliography ==
- Ritratto di donna : Tina Modotti – Vangelista, Vidali, Vittorio. 1982.
- Ritorno alla città senza pace : il 1948 a Trieste – Vangelista, Vidali, Vittorio. 1982.
- Spagna lunga battaglia – Vangelista, Vidali, Vittorio. 1975.
- Sul titismo : conferenza tenuta dal compagno Vittorio Vidali ai comunisti di Trieste ed agli allievi delle scuole del PCI di Roma e Bologna - Il lavoratore, Vidali, Vittorio. 1950.
- La caduta della repubblica – Vangelista, Vidali, Vittorio. 1979.
- Antifascisti di Trieste, dell'Istria, dell'Isontino e del Friuli in Spagna - a cura dell'Associazione italiana combattenti volontari antifascisti in Spagna, 1974.
- Diario di Cuba 1973: ritorno a Cuba - Vangelista, Vidali, Vittorio. 1973.
- Comandante Carlos - Editori Riuniti, Vidali, Vittorio. 1983.
- Giornale di bordo – Vangelista, Vidali, Vittorio. 1977. .
- Dal Messico a Murmansk – Vangelista, Vidali, Vittorio. 1975.
- Orizzonti di libertà – Vangelista, Vidali, Vittorio. 1980.
- Missione a Berlino - Vangelista Vidali, Vittorio. 1978.
- Tina Modotti fotografa e rivoluzionaria – IE. 1979.
- Unire tutte le forze per ottenere un piano di rinascita per Trieste : intervento al Consiglio comunale di Trieste, nella seduta del 9 gennaio 1961 - Federazione autonoma triestina del PCI, Vidali, Vittorio. 1961

== Printed sources ==
In English:

- Albers, Patricia (2002). Shadows, Fire, Snow: The Life of Tina Modotti. Clarkson Potter, 382 pages; ISBN 0-609-60069-9
- Cacucci, Pino (Translated by Patricia J. Duncan). (1999) Tina Modotti: A Life. St. Martin's Press, 225 pages; ISBN 0-312-20036-6
- Tennant, Gary (1999). Dissident Cuban Communism: The Case of Trotskyism, 1932-1965 PhD Thesis, University of Bradford, England
- Thomas, Hugh (1997). The Spanish Civil War. Harper and Row, New York. Revised and enlarged edition. ISBN 0-06-014278-2
- Thomas, Hugh (1998). Cuba or the Pursuit of Freedom, Da Capo Press; Updated edition (April, 1998) ISBN 0-306-80827-7
- Volodarsky, Boris (2015). Stalin's Agent: The Life and Death of Alexander Orlov. Oxford University Press, 832 pages; ISBN 978-0199656585

In Spanish:

- González Aguayo, Rosa María, René Aguilar Díaz, Gerardo Aragón Carrillo, Eduardo Morales Trujado, Jaime Peralta Benitez, and Enrique Salame Méndez (accessed 05/12/2005) "Diego Rivera, Chapingo, Capilla Riveriana." Universidad Autónoma de Chapingo
- Jeifets L., Jeifets V., Huber P. "La Internacional Comunista y America Latina, 1919-1943." El diccionario biografico. Moscu-Ginebra, 2004.
- Ross, Marjorie (2004). El secreto encanto de la KGB: las cinco vidas de Iósif Griguliévich (The Secret Charm of the KGB: The Five Lives of Joseph Grigulievich), San Jose, Costa Rica: Farben Grupo Editorial Norma, Costa Rica

In Italian:

- Karlsen, Patrick (2019). Vittorio Vidali. Vita di uno stalinista (1916-1956). Il Mulino, Bologna.
- Napoli, Diana (2023). Il mondo in testa. Vittorio Vidali, scene di vita di un rivoluzionario di professione. Manni editori, Lecce
