= 46th Division (Spain) =

- 46.ª División
- Flag of the 46th Division
- Active: June 1937–7 February 1939
- Country: Spanish Republic
- Allegiance: Republican faction
- Branch: Spanish Republican Army
- Type: Infantry
- Size: Division
- Engagements: Spanish Civil War: Battle of Brunete; Battle of Belchite; Battle of Teruel; Battle of Alfambra; Aragon Offensive; Battle of Lleida; Battle of the Ebro; Catalonia Offensive

Commanders
- Notable commanders: Valentín González; Domiciano Leal Sargenta †; Vicente López Tovar; Rodolfo Bosch Pearson

The 46th Division was one of the divisions of the Spanish Republican Army that were created during the Spanish Civil War.

== History ==
=== Formation ===
The 46th Division was formed in June 1937 by grouping the 10th and 101st Mixed Brigades under a Division. The 10th Mixed Brigade's commander, Valentín González, became the 46th Division's commander.

=== Notable Actions ===
During the Battle of Brunete, the Division had successfully captured the Villanueva de la Cañada after a day of fighting. During the battle, about 300 men of the division were captured by the Moroccan Regulars and later were executed and badly mutilated.

Alongside the 11th Division and the 35th International Division, the 46th Division participated in the Battle of Belchite.

During the later stages of the Battle of Teruel, division was surrounded in the city. The division was ordered to retreat by General Juan Hernández Saravia, the commanding officer of the Levantine Army and the overall commander of Republican forces in Teruel. González ordered that wounded soldiers of the division were to be left behind during the retreat which resulted in 1,500 soldiers of the division being captured. After the battle, González accused Juan Modesto and Enrique Líster of abandoning him and the men of the 46th Division while Líster accused González of deserting.

The Division performed rearguard actions during the Aragon Offensive. During this time, it also managed to restore discipline amongst Republican soldiers in the area.

Between 28 March and 3 April 1938, the 46th Division fought in the Battle of Lleida against the Nationalist 13th Division. Despite suffering a 40% casualty rate and losing the city of Lleida, the 46th Division managed to temporarily delay the advance of Nationalist forces.

=== Battle of the Ebro ===
On 24 July 1938, Valentín González was dismissed from command by General Enrique Líster and was replaced by Major Domiciano Leal Sargenta. The next day, on 25 July 1938, the entire 46th Division crossed the Ebro river. After securing a bridgehead, the 46th Division linked up with the 11th Division where the two divisions planned to take control of the heights of the Pandols and Cavalls mountain ranges in order to advance on the towns of Gandesa, Batea and Bot. On the 26 July, the 11th and 46th divisions managed to take the heights of Pandols and Cavalls. However, both divisions had exhausted their manpower and could not launch an assault on Gandesa, Batea, or Bot. On 23 September 1938, Domiciano Leal Sargenta was killed by a Nationalist artillery strike. He was replaced by Vicente López Tovar, a future member of the French Resistance.

=== Catalonia Offensive and Disbandment ===
During the Catalonia Offensive, the 46th Division, along with the rest of the V Corps, failed to halt the Nationalists' advance and suffered heavy casualties in the process. On 17 January 1939, while retreating to Barcelona, Militia Major Rodolfo Bosch Pearson took over command of the division where he and surviving members of the division retreated across the French boarder in February.

=== War Crimes ===
During the 46th Division's life span, it committed numerous war crimes. Shortly after the Battle of Brunete, the 46th Division had executed 400 Moroccan soldiers who they had taken as prisoners of war. González himself gained notoriety in the Republican ranks for his brutality towards prisoners of war.

== Sources ==
- Alpert, Michael (2013). The Republican Army in the Spanish Civil War, 1936-1939. Cambridge University Press. ISBN 978-1-107-02873-9.
- Engel, Carlos (1999). Historia de las Brigadas Mixtas del Ejército Popular de la República. Madrid: Almena. ISBN 84-922644-7-0.
- Payne, Stanley G. (2006) [1996]. "De Teruel a la batalla del Ebro". In Edward Malefakis (ed.). La Guerra Civil española (2nd ed.). Madrid: Taurus. pp. 321-347. ISBN 84-306-0614-9.
- Sagués San José, Joan (2014). La Lleida vençuda i ocupada del 1938 (in Catalan). Lleida: Pagès Editors. ISBN 978-84-9975-482-6.
- Salas Larrazábal, Ramón (2006). Historia del Ejército Popular de la República. Madrid: La Esfera de los Libros. ISBN 84-9734-465-0.
- Thomas, Hugh (1995). Historia de la Guerra Civil Española. Barcelona: Grijalbo. ISBN 84-253-2767-9.
