= Battle of Guadarrama =

1936 Spanish Civil War battle

Coordinates: 41°9′26.7″N 3°35′6.3″W

- Part of the Spanish Civil War
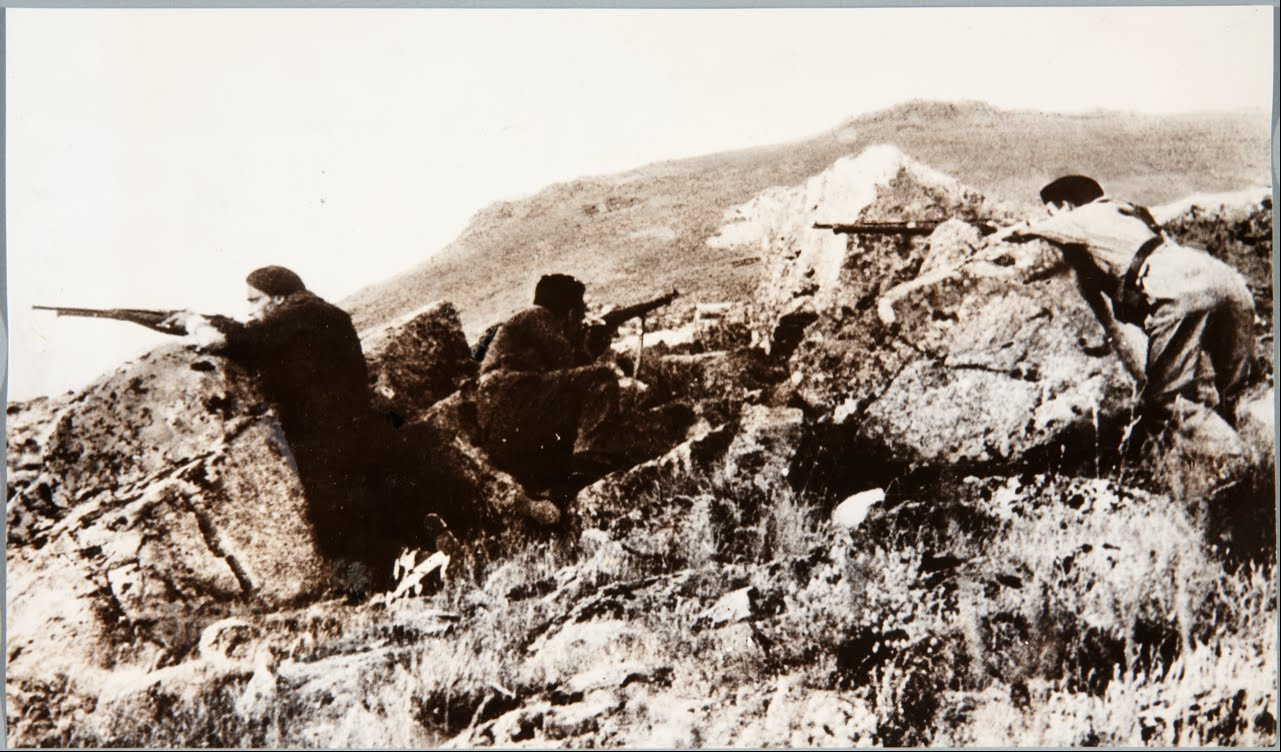
- Republican soldiers and militiamen in the mountains at Navacerrada.
Date	22 July – 15 September 1936
Location	Guadarrama Range, Ávila, Madrid and Segovia provinces, Spain
Result	Nationalist offensive stopped; Front at the Sierra de Guadarrama stabilized until 1939

Belligerents
(Spain) Spanish Republic	(Spain) Nationalist rebels

Commanders and leaders
Maj. Gen. José Riquelme y López-Bago; Col. Enrique del Castillo; Lt. Col. Julio Mangada; Lt. José María Galán; Lt. Francisco Galán; Cpt. Fernando Condés †; Juan Modesto; Cipriano Mera	(Spain) Gen. Emilio Mola (Spain) Col. Francisco García-Escámez (Spain) Col. José Gistau Algarra (Spain) Lt. Col. Lisardo Doval (Spain) Col. Ricardo Serrador Santés; Onésimo Redondo †

Units involved
Spanish Republican Army; Antifascist Worker and Peasant Militias: Fifth Regiment	Spanish Army; FE de las JONS militias Requetés

Strength
At least 1 Bréguet 19	

The Battle of Guadarrama (Spanish: Batalla de Guadarrama), also known as the Battle of Somosierra (Batalla de Somosierra), was a battle that occurred in the Sierra de Guadarrama during the Spanish Civil War from 22 July to 15 September 1936.

The Nationalists sent by Emilio Mola attempted to cross the mountain passes of the Sierra de Guadarrama to advance on the capital city of Madrid from the north. The Republicans sent a force of militiamen and soldiers from Madrid to stop the advance, with most of the fighting taking place at the Somosierra pass in the last week of July and in early August. The Republicans were successful at preventing the Nationalists from crossing the mountain passes and held the front at the Sierra de Guadarrama for the remainder of the war.

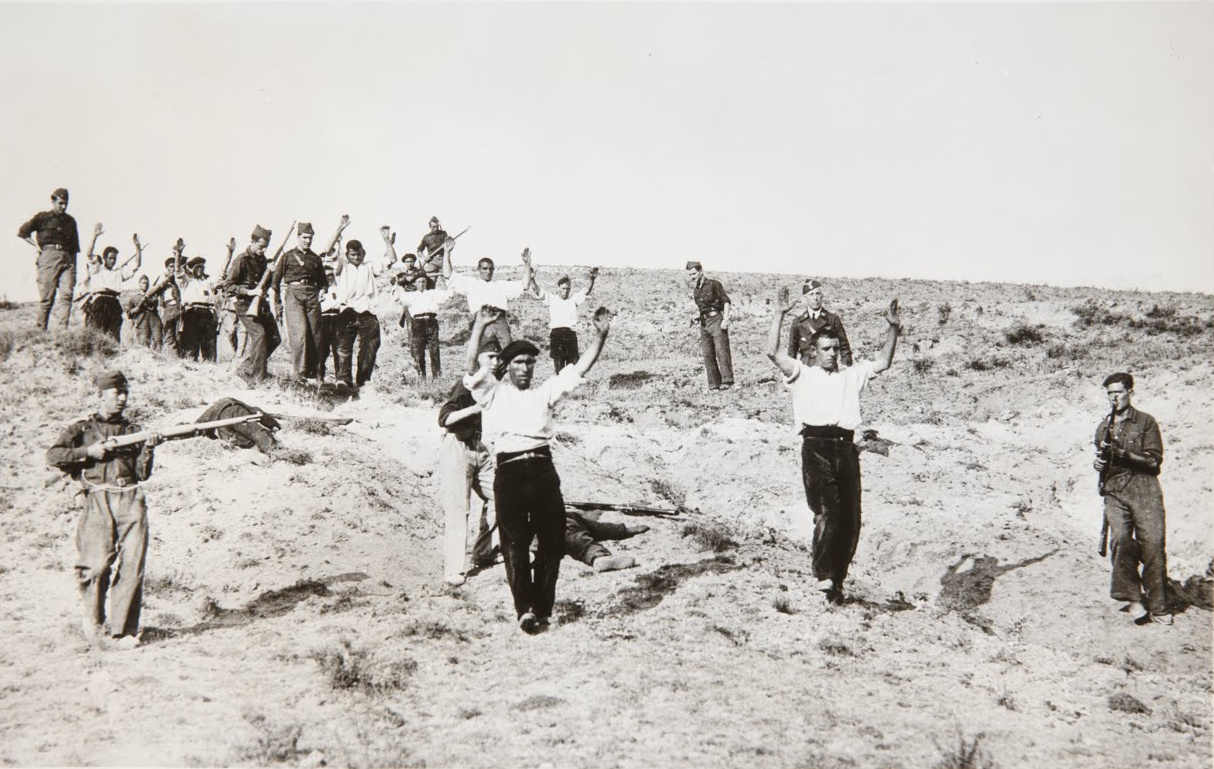
Republican militiamen surrendering in Somosierra.

== Background ==
Since 17 July 1936, some troops of Spanish Republican Army had joined the Nationalist rebellion against the left-wing Popular Front government of the Second Spanish Republic. The Nationalist leader, General Emilio Mola, coordinated the uprisings of army garrisons to implement a state of war in Spain. Mola realised that it would be difficult for the coup to succeed by itself in the capital Madrid under the command of General Joaquín Fanjul, so it was planned that a column from the north would march on the city to support the uprising. Should this fail, troops under the command of General Francisco Franco would march from the Moroccan Protectorate across the Strait of Gibraltar and advance on Madrid from the south and west.

== Operations ==
On 19 July, after Mola seized control of Navarra, he sent a column under Colonel Francisco García-Escámez to the south to support the coup in Guadalajara. When the column was around 30 kilometres from its objective, it learned that the uprising in Guadalajara had already failed and the city was in the hands of Republican forces from Madrid. García-Escámez decided to go to Somosierra, the easternmost pass that crosses the Sierra de Guadarrama to Madrid. He met a group of monarchists from Madrid including Joaquín Satrústegui and Carlos Miralles who were defending the railway tunnel against the Republican forces that had taken Guadalajara. On 22 July, Escámez's column managed to secure control of the pass, vital for the advance south towards Madrid.

At midnight on 21 July, another Nationalist column made up of two or three hundred men led by Colonel Ricardo Serrador Santés left Valladolid "amid scenes of indescribable enthusiasm." General José Sanjurjo continued with the mission of occupying Alto del León, the other important pass in the Sierra de Guadarrama, located to the west of Somosierra. When they arrived at the pass, they found it already occupied by a group of Republican militiamen from Madrid. By 25 July, Serrador's men had defeated the militiamen and secured the pass for the Nationalists. Neither the columns of García-Escámez or Serrador were able to advance towards Madrid due to lack of ammunition, and they began preparing to resist a counterattack of the Republican forces. Over the following days, their situation seemed dire, but they finally received the ammunition that Franco had sent from Andalusia arrived.

A Republican column under the command of Colonel Mangada left Madrid in the direction of Ávila to try to isolate the Nationalist forces occupying Alto del León from the rear. In his advance, Mangada conquered several towns in which the Civil Guard had joined the coup, but did not go beyond Navalperal de Pinares, fearful of losing communication with Madrid and being isolated. Nationalist propaganda had attributed that decision to the "intervention" of Santa Teresa de Ávila who had deceived Mangada by telling him that Ávila was "full of armed men". Lisardo Doval, the commander of the Civil Guard known for having led the brutal repression that followed the defeat of the Asturian miners' strike of 1934, tried but failed to stop Mangada's advance. Doval's failure gave Mangada a great reputation that earned him a promotion to the rank of general despite the fact that he had not fulfilled his mission of taking Avila.

Columns of Republican militiamen and volunteer soldiers were sent to evict the Nationalist troops from the pass of Somosierra. They were commanded by the brothers Francisco Galán, a lieutenant of the Civil Guard, and José María Galán, a lieutenant of the Carabineros. These columns were joined by the CNT, a powerful anarchist trade union which had formed its own militias, and included prominent leaders from Madrid such as Cipriano Mera and Teodoro Mora. Captain González Gil organized the so-called "October" Battalion with workers from the aeronautical industry, among others. The idea of putting loyal professional officers in command of the militia columns, or at least advising their bosses, came from General José Riquelme, who was in command of the troops in Madrid and the 1st Organic Division. Of the militia units that fought in the Sierra de Guadarrama the most famous was the Fifth Regiment, organized by the Communist Party of Spain. Their starting point had been the communist militia (MAOC) and the "La Pasionaria" battalion formed in the first days of the coup in Madrid. This unit was organized following the model of the Red Army and had political commissars who had to explain to the soldiers the reasons for the fight and ratify the orders of the military leaders. The man to inspire the unit was the Italian communist and Comintern agent Vittorio Vidali (“Carlos Contreras”) and its first boss was the young communist Enrique Castro Delgado. Another communist who also stood out in the fighting in the mountains, although outside the Fifth Regiment, was Valentín González "El Campesino".

The Republicans had the advantage in the battle of Guadarrama with both artillery and air superiority, in addition to the easy logistics provided by the close proximity to Madrid. In August, there were already some 40,000 militiamen framed in columns of about 300 men each in Madrid, who adopted distinctive revolutionary names such as the "Paris Commune" or "October 1st". The Republic could not count on regular military units with their commands and their equipment however, because the government of José Giral had decreed the dissolution of these units to stop the uprising. In addition, the conflicts between the militia chiefs and the professional military were constant, especially with the anarchist Confederal militias.

== Aftermath ==
The fighting in the Sierra de Guadarrama was fierce and led to prisoners of war being shot on both sides, but the Republicans were able to halt the Nationalist advance on Madrid from the north.

It is very difficult to estimate the number of victims because the number of fighters who left for the front was unknown, although less than 5,000 were killed. On the Republican side, many officers were killed, including Captains Condés, Fontán Cadarso and González Gil. Condes was, along with the deceased Luis Cuenca, one of the men related to the murder of José Calvo Sotelo. Colonel Castillo, who was in command of the Republican forces in Alto del León, was apparently killed by his own men or possibly committed suicide when he learned that his son was killed in action. On the Nationalist side, the death of the Falangist leader Onésimo Redondo was notable, killed in a meeting in Labajos by some militiamen who had penetrated beyond the front lines.

At the end of May 1937, the Republicans launched the Segovia Offensive to capitalise on their victory at the 1936 battle, however the attempt was unsuccessful and in less than a week the offensive had failed. Throughout the rest of the war, this front remained static until the final offensive of the Nationalists at the end of March 1939, ending the war with their victory.

== See also ==
- List of Spanish Nationalist military equipment of the Spanish Civil War
- List of Spanish Republican military equipment of the Spanish Civil War
- Fifth Regiment
