= 13th Division (Nationalist Spain) =

- Active: 16 September 1936 – 20 August 1943
- Country: Spain
- Type: Infantry
- Role: Shock troops
- Part of: I Army Corps
- Nickname: The Black Hand
- Engagements: Spanish Civil War: Battle of Brunete; Battle of Lleida (1938)

Commanders
- Notable commanders: Fernando Barrón

The 13th Division also known as The Black Hand was a Division of the Nationalist faction during the Spanish Civil War.

== History ==
=== Spanish Civil War ===
The unit was formed on 16 September 1936 as the "Barrón Column". It became the 13th Division in April 1937.

During the Battle of Brunete, the 13th Division successfully pushed back the Republican 11th Division, capturing the town of Brunete on 26 July 1937.

In 1938, during the Battle of Lleida, the 13th Division suffered a 10% casualty rate while inflicting a 40% casualty rate on the Republican 46th Division.

=== After the Spanish Civil War ===
The 13th Division was disbanded on 20 August 1943 and replaced by Armoured Division No. 1 "Brunete".
