= 11th Division (Spain) =

11th Division 11ª División
- Flag of the 11th Division of the People's Republican Army
- Active: 1937–1939
- Country: Spain
- Branch: Spanish Republican Army
- Type: Infantry division
- Role: Home Defence
- Size: Three mixed brigades: 1st, 9th and 100st
- Part of: V Army Corps (July 1937 – February 1939)
- Nickname(s): División Líster
- Engagements: Spanish Civil War
- Decorations: Laureate Plate of Madrid

Commanders
- Notable commanders: Enrique Lister

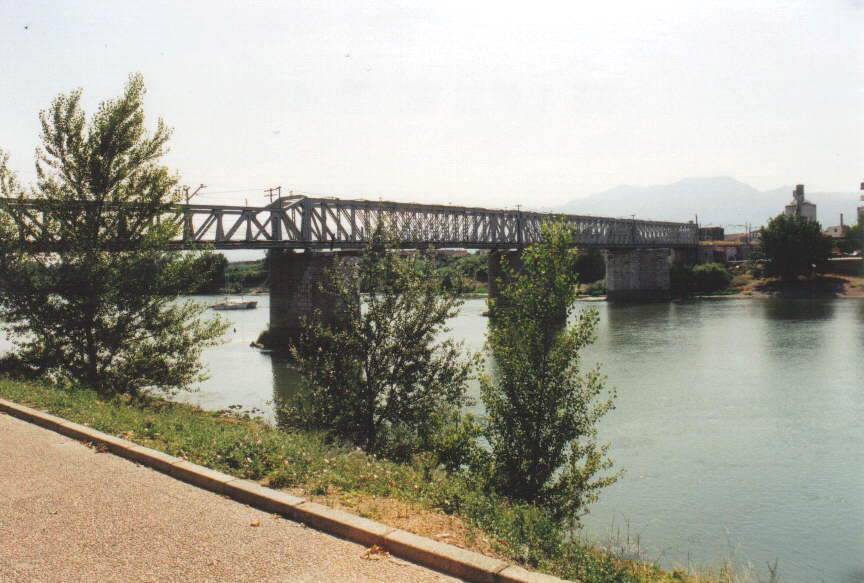
Metal bridge at Tortosa where the 11th Division stopped the Fascist Italian troops of the Corpo Truppe Volontarie.

The 11th Division (Spanish: 11ª División) was a division of the Spanish Republican Army in the Spanish Civil War. It was formed in January 1937 in Madrid beginning with the 1st Mixed Brigade which in turn had originated in the Fifth Regiment.

Nicknamed División Líster, it would become one of the elite divisions, as well as one of the most battle-hardened formations, of the Spanish Republican Armed Forces.

== History ==
=== Origins: The 'C Division' ===
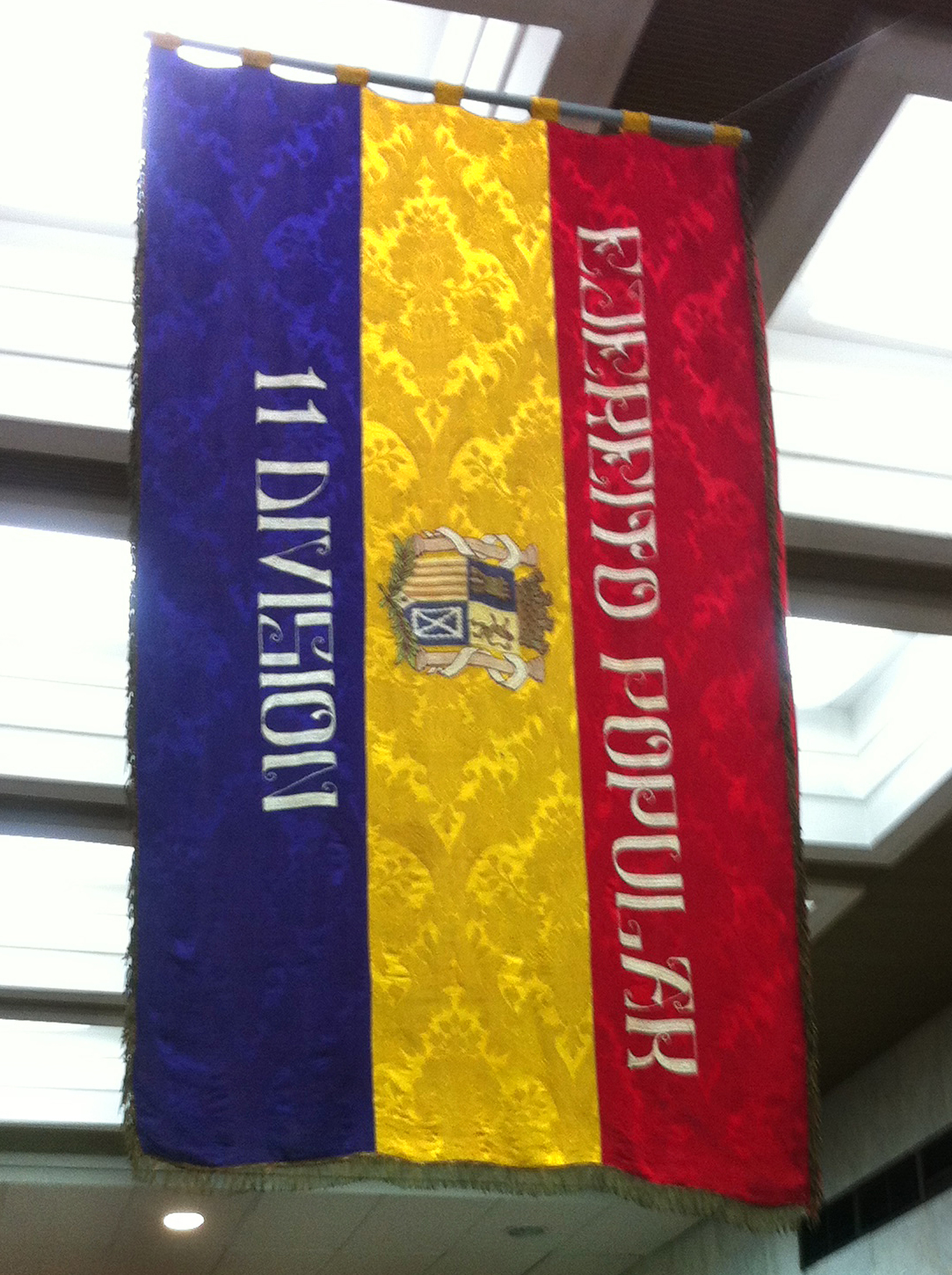
Flag of the 11th Division at an exhibition dedicated to the Spanish Civil War

Although the 11th Division was officially established on 24 January 1937, its origin lies in the C Division of the Republican Army that was created owing to circumstances by joining a number of newly constituted mixed brigades in order to send them to the Jarama River area in order to respond to the rebel attacks towards the Valencia road. However, after much effort, Enrique Líster's men were successful in repelling the rebel offensive at the Battle of Jarama, where the combats in the El Pingarrón area caused a high number of casualties in loyalist ranks. Finally, towards the end of February the rebel advance in the Jarama banks was halted and fixed until the end of the Civil War. After the victory and, as a result of the reorganization of the Spanish Republican Armed forces, the 'C Division' firmly became the 11th Division.

=== Battles of Guadalajara and Brunete ===
Following the bloodbath at the Jarama the 11th Division was barely being reorganized when it was sent to Guadalajara where on 8 March the Fascist Italian Corpo Truppe Volontarie had launched an offensive. The purpose of the Italians was to encircle the loyalists in a pocket around Madrid and the ensuing battle would be known as Battle of Guadalajara. In this conflict the 11th Division was formed by the 1st Bis Mixed Brigade, the 1st Mobile Shock Brigade (1.ª Brigada Móvil de Choque) led by Valentín González "El Campesino" —which would later be known as the 10th Mixed Brigade— as well as the XI International Brigade ("Thälmann Brigade") and the XII International Brigade ("Garibaldi Brigade"). The 11th Division, together with the 12th and the 14th divisions —the latter under Cipriano Mera—, was put under the newly established IV Army Corps under the command of Enrique Jurado Barrio. After Guadalajara the 11th Division took part in the Battle of Brunete in the summer 1937. There Líster and his division resisted at the Brunete graveyard until 25 July, but ended up losing the disputed town in the face of the heavy Francoist assaults.

=== Interventions in Aragon ===
The independence with which the Regional Defence Council of Aragon acted had always been an irritant for the republican authorities. Thus, after having re-established its control over Catalonia, the republican government, backed by its republican, socialist and communist sectors, was determined to disband this Aragonese entity. Finally on 4 August 1937 Indalecio Prieto, the National Defense Minister, ordered the Spanish Republican Army to intervene and the 11th Division was sent to Aragon, officially disbanding the Aragon Council (Consejo de Aragón) on 10 August. Joaquín Ascaso and various anarchist members of the Regional Defence Council were arrested under various charges, such as jewel smuggling. A total of about 700 anarchists ended up being arrested in those days in Aragon. The fact that the 11th Division was chosen for this operation demonstrated the high regard in which it was held by the Republican government.

Once in Aragon the division participated in the Zaragoza Offensive on 24 August which eventually gave way to the difficult Battle of Belchite. The 11th Division fought these battles together with the 35th International led by General "Walter" and again with the 46th Division led by "El Campesino". The 11th Division was then under the V Army Corps led by Modesto. In October the division was again sent to an operation against the rebels in Zaragoza through Fuentes de Ebro, but despite the forty new BT-5 tanks deployed by Lister's unit, the battle ended in disaster owing to the intense rains and the muddy terrain, so that only 28 tanks came back safely to Republican lines. After this turn of events the campaign stabilized and the 11th Division remained in Aragon through the Autumn of 1937, being later sent to fight the Battle of Teruel.

In Teruel the 11th Division fought together with the 25th Division led by García Vivancos in the Columna Norte, of the XXII Army Corps led by Lieutenant Colonel Ibarrola. Here the 11th was given the mission to break the front and be at the vanguard of the attack, which the division did on 15 December under heavy snow. Before the evening the city was surrounded by Republican and Lister went to the strategic La Muela hill. The 11th Division suffered many casualties, as all units involved in the ensuing defence of the city against the fierce rebel counterattacks. When the defence became impossible, Líster was ordered to withdraw his troops, following which he was criticized by El Campesino, who was trapped with the 46th Division in the city. But later both Líster and Modesto, leader of the V Army Corps, would in turn accuse El Campesino of having fled Teruel leaving his men behind.

Following the bloodbath at Teruel the 11th Division was sent to the rearguard in order to recover from the heavy losses it had suffered. But there would be no respite for the much-battered Republicans, for right after reconquering Teruel the rebel faction launched the massive Aragon Offensive that caught all republican units that were in Aragon by surprise and routed the Eastern Army (Ejército del Este). In the middle of the hasty and chaotic withdrawal the 11th Division troops were able, however, to contain the Fascist Italian Corpo Truppe Volontarie troops when these arrived to the lower course of the Ebro at the beginning of April 1938. The resistance put up by the 11th Division would be decisive to briefly stop their advance in the Ebro, but the division would remain henceforward locked in Catalonia and isolated from the remaining Republican territory when the rebel troops led by General Aranda reached the Mediterranean Sea on 3 April, dividing the Spanish Republic in two.

=== Last battles and end of the division ===
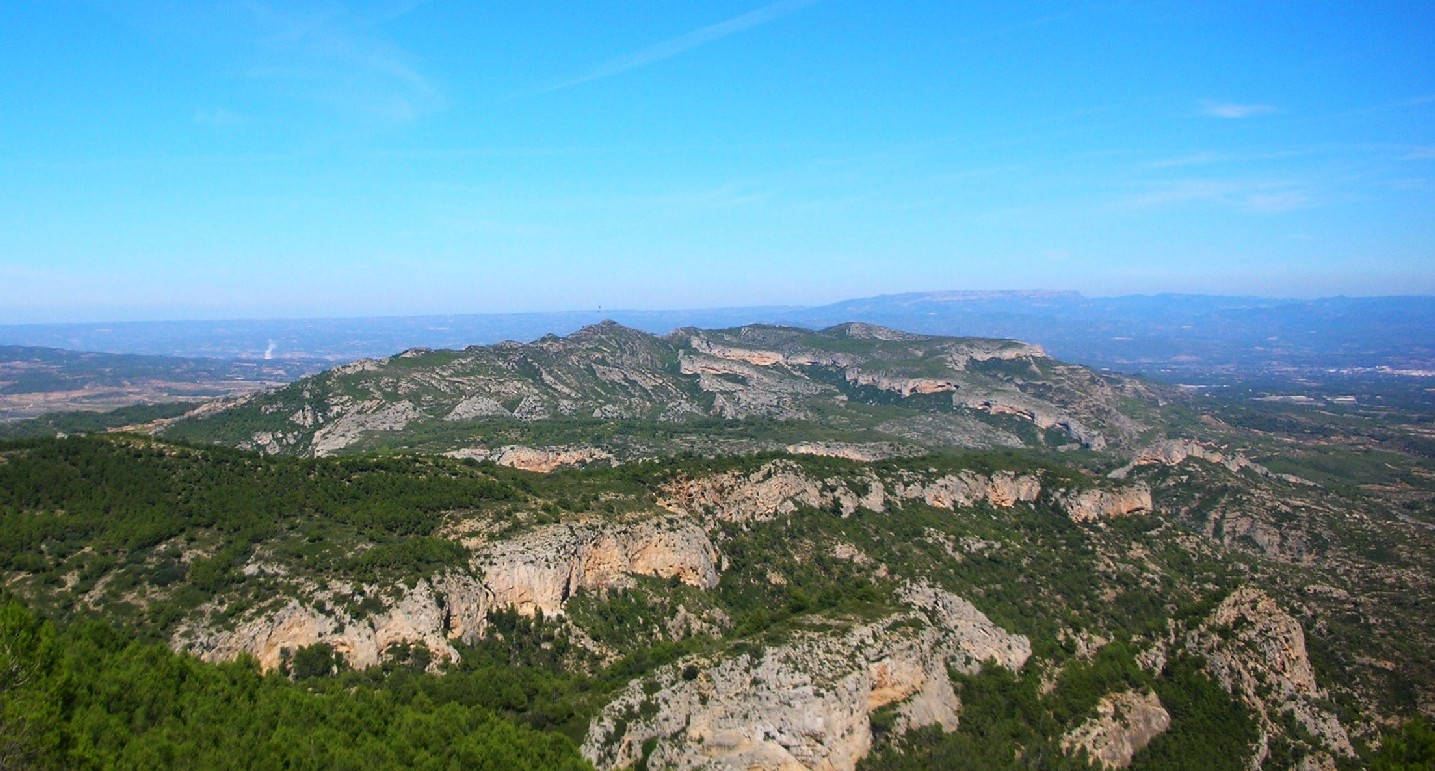
View of the Pandols Range, defended by the 11th Division during the Battle of the Ebro.

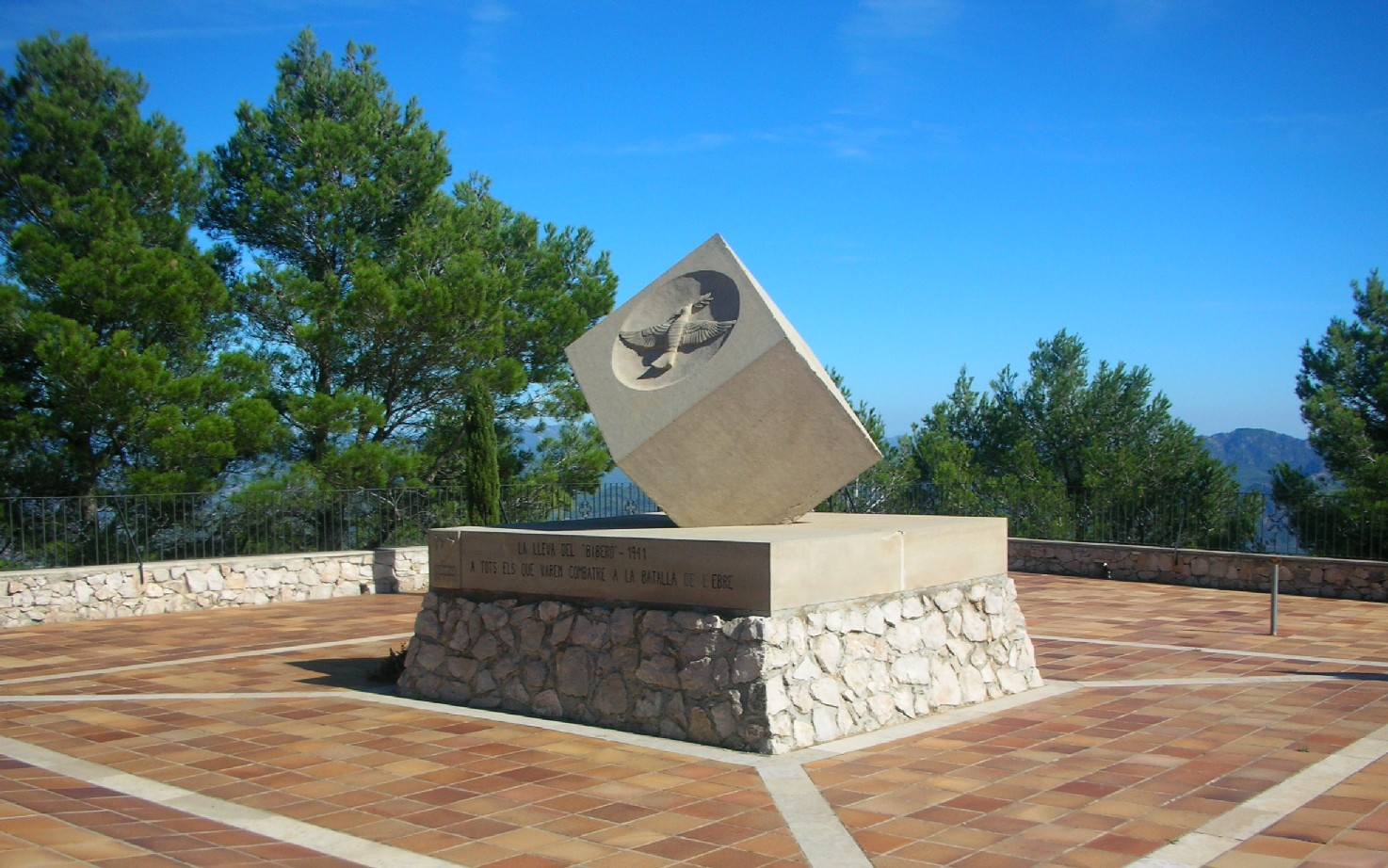
Monument to those who died defending the Spanish Republic on the much disputed Hill 705 of the Pandols Range where many men of the 11th Division lost their lives.

==== Battle of the Ebro ====
On 25 July 1938 in the early morning, at the onset of the Battle of the Ebro, the 11th Division crossed the Ebro River between Ginestar and Benifallet. It was one of the favourite units of Modesto, Chief Commander of the Ebro Army, and had been awarded the honor and responsibility of being the spearhead of the whole V Republican Army Corps during the attack. However, the 11th Division would be also the first unit that was seen by the troops of the rebel army and thus had to endure the fiercest and most scathing attacks. Despite the difficulties the division fulfilled all its military targets and launched an attack against Móra d'Ebre, the most important town in the Ribera d'Ebre comarca.

But Móra d'Ebre housed a large number of enemy troops and the 11th Division, not being able to dislodge them, chose to encircle the town leaving its defenders isolated. After conquering the bridgehead, the 11th Division advanced towards the mountains in order to link with the troops of the 46th Division in order to control the strategic heights of the Pandols and Cavalls ranges above the town of Gandesa. In the early morning hours of 26 July the Republican troops reached their objectives, but after the long march and the ascension of the rocky ranges the men of the 11th Division were physically exhausted. Thus the division did not launch the planned surprise attack against Gandesa and was not able to continue the advance southwards in order to reach Bot and Batea.

On 2 August the Republican advance had run out of steam and the 11th Division occupied the Pandols Range, holding its position against the 84th Division of the rebel faction and entrenching itself in the rocky hills awaiting the enemy counterattack. The Francoist counterattack was fierce and intense. For a whole week the Republican division was subjected to a continuous hail of artillery and airborne projectiles, while its men repelled numerous attacks of the enemy infantry, especially from the 4th Navarra Division which was made up of three Spanish Legion units. Despite the bloodbath in the veteran Republican ranks, Modesto insisted in keeping the Pandols position and ordered the integration of all the artillery of the V Corps in the 11th Division. However, after numerous waves of continuous attacks the Francoist troops succeeded in wrestling the hills from the Republican division on 15 August —including the highly disputed Hill 705, which changed hands no less than eight times on 14 August. Owing to the high number of casualties caused by enemy artillery and close combat in the highest points of the range, the battered 11th Division units were relieved and partially replaced by the 35th Division. Following its valiant and resilient behaviour and the losses it had to bear, the 11th Division was awarded the Laureate Plate of Madrid, but the Spanish Republic had lost a great number of irreplaceable battle-hardened veterans.

At the beginning of September the division returned to its former positions in the Pandols Range, where the Francoist armies would give no respite, so that again it fought fierce battles against the rebel troops for a period of two months, losing some key positions and continuing to suffer a high number of casualties. Finally a massive Francoist counteroffensive began at the end of October and the much crushed 11th Division could no longer bear the avalanche of rebel attacks. The rebel counteroffensive marked the end of the Battle of the Ebro and on 5 November what remained of the 11th Division withdrew, crossing again the Ebro River at Benifallet.

==== Catalonia Campaign ====
Last area under Republican control after the Fall of Catalonia in February 1939. The French authorities would not allow the 11th Division to be transferred to this area after having entered France.

Following the Battle of the Ebro debacle the 11th Division retreated to the rearguard in order to recover and reorganize, being temporarily made part of the Republican Military Reserve. But not long thereafter, on 23 December, the rebel faction launched its final Catalonia Offensive and the 11th Division —which had been in need of a longer period of rest— was urgently deployed in the Segre Front, together with the remainder of the V Army Corps commanded by Enrique Lister, in order to close the gaps in the front where inexperienced groups of the Eastern Army had fled in panic before the fierce rebel assault, abandoning the lines they were defending at the Segre River. Enrique Lister set up his general headquarters at Castelldans and with his competent, battle-hardenend troops he was able to contain the Francoist onslaught for almost two weeks in the area near Borges Blanques. Finally on 3 January 1939 the rebels launched a powerful attack against Lister's divisions with armoured vehicles in the vanguard, so that even the men 11th Division became overwhelmed and had to abandon their lines of defence and the much devastated town of Borges Blanques fell to the Fascist Italian troops of the Corpo Truppe Volontarie (CTV). Later some of the Republican forces counterattacked and made some prisoners among the Italian Fascists, which were executed after having been interrogated. But in the face of the vehement Francoist offensive all Republican units had to retreat and left the area of the Segre Front, gradually withdrawing in a northeastern direction.

Thus the Ebro Army covered the massive Republican retreat along the Mediterranean coastline until reaching Barcelona, where there had been plans to organize a strong resistance against the Fascist onslaught on the lines of the Defence of Madrid in 1936. But the option proved unrealistic, for the city's population was hungry and demoralized and the troops lacked arms and ammunition, hence the only option open for the exhausted Republican divisions of the elite V Corps was to abandon Barcelona to its fate and retreat towards the French border. By the beginning of February what remained of the units of the 11th Division arrived to the northern zone of Catalonia where, together with other retreating Republican units, they tried to establish a defensive line along the lower course of the Tordera River to halt the powerful advance of the rebel armies, but this effort quickly proved unsuccessful in the face of scathing enemy attacks.

This last-ditch attempt had been part of a grand strategy of the Spanish Republic to resist the Francoist offensives until the deemed onset of a larger European War between the Fascist powers and the western democracies, in order to link the Spanish conflict with the wider European one. Thus Modesto and Líster saw the retreat to France of the remainder of the Ebro Army as part of a tactical evacuation, with the aim to regroup these units with the remaining units of the last area under Republican control in order to continue the resistance. The French government, however, would not allow the Republican units that crossed the border to be transferred to the remaining Spanish Republican territory, for all the veteran survivors of the 11th Division, together with all Republican military, were disarmed and swiftly interned in French concentration camps right after crossing its border. Thus the 11th Division, along with all units of the V Army Corps, was extinguished.

Before its demise the 11th Division had briefly resisted, however, in the line of the Ter River on 5 February, and after crossing the Muga River on 8 February. Finally, in the early morning of 9 February the last units of the once mighty Ebro Army under Modesto crossed the border into France and the very next day all Spanish border posts fell into Francoist hands.

== Order of battle ==
Date	Army Corps	Mixed Brigades	Battlefront
February 1937	III Army Corps	1st, 1st Bis, 23rd, 66th and 70th	Jarama
March 1937	IV Army Corps	1st Bis, 10th, XI and XII	Guadalajara
2 April 1937	V Army Corps	1st, 48th and 71st	Madrid
27 April 1937	V Army Corps	1st, 9th and XII	Madrid
4 July 1937	V Army Corps	1st, 9th and 100th	Brunete
15 December 1937	XXII Army Corps	1st, 9th and 100th	Teruel
13 March 1938	V Army Corps	1st, 9th and 100th	Reserve
December 1938	V Army Corps	1st, 9th and 100th	Segre

== Commanders ==
- Commanders in Chief
  - Enrique Lister
  - Joaquín Rodríguez López
- Commissars
  - Santiago Álvarez Gómez
  - José Fusimaña Fábregas
- Chief of Staff Leaders
  - Julio Suárez-Llanos Adiansens
  - Manuel López Iglesias
  - Fernando Pozo Oliver July 1938
  - Jesús Sáiz Barberá

== See also ==
- Fifth Regiment
- Mixed Brigades
