= Fifth Regiment =

Fifth Regiment Quinto Regimiento
- Active: 1936–1937
- Disbanded: 20 January 1937
- Country: Spain
- Allegiance: Second Spanish Republic
- Branch: MAOC
- Type: Elite corps
- Role: Model military unit
- Size: 6,000 (August 1936); 20,000 (est. November 1936)
- Headquarters: Madrid
- March: El quinto regimiento
- Engagements: Spanish Civil War: Siege of Cuartel de la Montaña; Battle of Guadarrama; Battle of Talavera; Siege of the Alcázar; Siege of Madrid

Commanders
- Notable commanders: Enrique Castro Delgado; Vittorio Vidali; Enrique Líster; Juan Guilloto León

Insignia
- Emblem

- Badge

The Fifth Regiment (Spanish: Quinto Regimiento, the full name Quinto Regimiento de Milicias Populares) was an elite corps loyal to the Spanish Republic at the onset of the Spanish Civil War. Made up of volunteers, the Fifth Regiment was active in the first critical phase of the war and became one of the most renowned units loyal to the Republic.

The number of soldiers in the Fifth Regiment quickly rose from about 6,000 in August to over 20,000 in November 1936. This loyalist elite corps lasted only until the Spanish Republican Army was reorganized in the second year of the civil war, but in barely half a year it had managed to become one of the most famous units of the whole conflict.

The Fifth Regiment used the desecrated building of the Church of San Francisco de Sales in Madrid as its headquarters. The mouthpiece of this military unit was the Milicia Popular newspaper and its anthem the El quinto regimiento song.

== History ==
Shortly after the Spanish coup of the 17 July 1936, the Republican Government took the radical decision of dissolving the Spanish Republican Armed Forces by granting unlimited leave to all military personnel and arming the trade unions. The measure was taken in order to ward off further rebellions of officers by depriving them of troops at their command. In the face of the void thus created, the Communist Party of Spain led the implementation of a policy that sought to replace the spontaneous and disorganized bands fighting for the Spanish Republic with loyal, disciplined and militarized units.

Finally, the Communist-led Antifascist Worker and Peasant Militias (MAOC) formed five battalions that took an active part in the Siege of Cuartel de la Montaña on 20 July 1936. One of these battalions became the "Fifth Regiment" (5º Regimiento de Milicias Populares), a military unit intended as a model for other military units to follow in the initial chaotic period of the civil war. Its first commander was Enrique Castro Delgado. Later the Fifth Regiment would take an active part in the battles of Somosierra and Guadarrama, as well as in the Battle of Talavera and the Siege of the Alcázar, ending up becoming one of the crucial military units engaged in the Defence of Madrid.

Most of the initial Fifth Regiment members belonged to the MAOC. However, it soon attracted members from other ideologies owing to its efficiency and capacity for organization in a critical time for the Republic, as compared to the chaotic militia groups that operated at the onset of the war. In the Fifth Regiment soldiers were not allowed to discuss the orders given by their superiors, a common practice in most of the spontaneous militia units that sprung up when weapons were issued to the trade unions. This fact alone made the Fifth Regiment much more effective against the first attacks of the rebel forces.

On 22 January 1937 the Fifth Regiment was integrated into the Popular Army of the Republic, the reorganized Spanish Republican Army, for which it had provided a basic pattern. Most of its members ended up in the First Mixed Brigade and in the 11th Division led by Enrique Líster while others joined the different units of the Republican Army and this famous regiment became extinct. Besides Enrique Líster, other important leaders of the Spanish Republican Army such as Juan Guilloto León "Modesto", Valentín González "El Campesino" and Etelvino Vega Martínez, were formed in the ranks of the Fifth Regiment.

=== Model unit ===
The Fifth Regiment was more than a military unit, for its activities reached into the social and cultural fields. Its members contributed to the development of education, imparting basic skills and knowledge to the poor and the less favoured members of Spanish society, vowing to eradicate illiteracy and social ills. Quinto Regimiento propaganda posters and murals became ubiquitous and well known in Madrid at the time, as well as its mobile libraries and its "Theatre Guerrillas" ("guerrillas teatrales), both in the city streets and in the front lines.

Quite a number of notable people were either members of the Fifth regiment or became associated with it. Among these the following deserve mention: Poets and writers such as Rafael Alberti, César Arconada, Pedro Garfias, Miguel Hernández, José Herrera Petere, María Teresa León and Juan Rejano, teachers such as Josep Renau, Wenceslao Roces and Alberto Sánchez, and artists such as Alberto Sánchez Pérez, as well as engineers and architects, such as Luis Lacasa Navarro and Manuel Sánchez Arcas, and physicians such as Juan Planelles Ripoll.

== In literature ==
The Fifth Regiment became an almost mythical unit that was the subject of poems and songs during the Spanish Civil War; one of these was ¡Soy del Quinto Regimiento! by Rafael Alberti:

Mañana dejo mi casa, dejo los bueyes y el pueblo. ¡Salud! ¿Adónde vas, dime? Voy al Quinto Regimiento. Caminar sin agua, a pie. Monte arriba, campo abierto. Voces de gloria y de triunfo. ¡Soy del Quinto Regimiento!	Tomorrow I leave my home, I leave the oxen and the village. Salute! Tell me where do you go? I'm going to the Fifth Regiment! To walk without water, on foot. Up the mountain, the open field. Voices of glory and triumph. I belong to the Fifth Regiment!

=== Books ===
- Modesto, Juan (1978). Soy del Quinto Regimiento: Notas de la Guerra Espanola [I am of the Fifth Regiment: Notes on the Spanish War]. ISBN 8472223639.

== See also ==
- Antifascist Worker and Peasant Militias
- Spanish Republican Army
- 1st Mixed Brigade
