= Latvian volunteers in the Spanish Civil War =

Latvian volunteers in Spanish Civil War

During the Spanish Civil War, many Latvian volunteers participated on both sides of the conflict, with larger numbers fighting on the side of the Soviet-supported Republicans. The Latvian government declared neutrality regarding the Spanish Civil War and even forbade its citizens from traveling to Spain to participate in the conflict. Latvians reached Spain illegally, often via France and using false passports. Most were workers from Liepāja and Riga, ideologically they were communists, socialists, or exiled democrats who had fled the 1934 Latvian coup d'état.

More than 200 Latvians fought for the Republic. Among them, approximately 140 were illegal Latvian volunteers, and the remaining about 60 were communists from the Soviet Union. Latvians served in artillery, sapper, machine, tank battalions, and groups. 16 Latvians fought in the Dimitrov Battalion of the 15th International Brigade. A group named after the revolutionary poet Leon Paegle operated in the battery of the 13th International Brigade.

The most famous Latvian volunteer was Pols Armāns (real name Paulis Tiltiņš). A native of Bauska district, he commanded a tank company in Spain and became the first tankman to be awarded the title of Hero of the Soviet Union (December 31, 1936). One of the battles he fought was the Battle of Seseña, which was a defeat for him and for the Republic.

During a minor operation by a Latvian group from the International Brigades, one Spanish Nationalist truck was burned and three Spanish Nationalist soldiers were killed.

As a result, at least 14 Latvian internationalists were killed in Spain. Some ended up in French concentration camps (Gurs, Argelès-sur-Mer), some remained in Spain, and 24 returned home but later died in World War II (the Great Patriotic War).

There were also Latvians who fought for the nationalists, about 38-42 people. They were mostly far-right, and some of them sympathized with Pērkonkrusts. They took part in the Battle of the Ebro, alongside white émigrés, nationalists, Italians, and the German Condor. Their subsequent fate is unknown.

== Bibliography ==
- de la Torre, Ignacio (2016). "LATVIAN VOLUNTEERS IN THE SPANISH CIVIL WAR". Social Sciences and Humanities: Latvia. 24 (1).
- Борцы Латвии в Испании (1936-1939). Воспоминания и документы. Riga: liesma. 1970.
- "Article in the periodical review HUMANITIES AND SOCIAL SCIENCES LATVIA". Brīvprātīgie.
- "LATVIAN VOLUNTEERS IN THE SPANISH CIVIL WAR". Academia.edu.
- "Латыши в Испании". Young Scientist.
- "Поль Арман. История латыша, ставшего героем Гражданской войны в Испании". Baltic News. 2020-11-08.
- "Latvia". Virtual Spanish Civil War.
- "Латыши в Испании". LiveJournal.
- "Латышские стрелки легиона СС". Zvezda Weekly. 2023-02-11.
- "Pols Armāns". Wikipedia.https://dzen.ru/a/X2b378gzhGodL77j
