= Battle of Lleida (1938) =

1938 battle

- Part of the Spanish Civil War
Date	26 March 1938 – 3 April 1938
Location	Lleida, Catalonia, Spain
Result	Nationalist victory

Belligerents
Spanish Republic	Nationalist Spain

Commanders and leaders
(Spain) Valentín González	(Francoist Spain) Fernando Barrón

Units involved
46th Division; 27th Division; 16th Division	13th Division

Strength
10,000 men 12 tanks 10 armored cars	Unknown

Casualties and losses
4,000 killed, wounded, or captured	2,000 killed or wounded

The Battle of Lleida (1938) took place during the Spanish Civil War in 1938 in the city of Lleida, western Catalonia.

== Background ==
On 7 March 1938, Francisco Franco ordered an offensive from Aragon towards the sea with the goal of isolating Catalonia from the rest of the Republican zone. As soon as Franco's troops entered Catalonia, the president of the Catalonia, Lluís Companys, gave a speech in Catalan announcing that "foreign armies are at the gates of our house." He called on the Catalans "to fight, to work and to resist, because to resist is to triumph and because we could not live without freedom. If the enemy wins, our language would be persecuted, our institutions mocked, our people subjugated, our customs mocked."

== Battle ==
The Republicans deployed 46th Division in the city with the mission of defending Lleida. It was supported by troops from the Republican 16th and 27th Divisions. Republican units were deployed in the surrounding orchards in order to establish a defensive perimeter.

== Aftermath ==
Republican forces suffered heavy casualties during the battle. The Republican 46th Division suffered a 40% casualty rate while the Nationalist 13th Division suffered a 10% casualty rate by comparison.

== Sources ==
- Sagués San José, Joan (2014). La Lleida vençuda i ocupada del 1938 (in Catalan). Lleida: Pagès Editors. ISBN 978-84-9975-482-6.
- Payne, Stanley G. (2006) [1996]. "De Teruel a la batalla del Ebro". In Edward Malefakis (dir.) (ed.). La Guerra Civil española (2nd ed.). Madrid: Taurus. pp. 321-347. ISBN 84-306-0614-9.
