= 1st Mixed Brigade =

1st Mixed Brigade Primera Brigada Mixta
- Flag of the 11th Division of the Popular Army of the Spanish Republic of which the 1st Mixed Brigade was a part
- Active: 10 October 1936 – 9 February 1939
- Country: Spain
- Branch: Spanish Republican Army
- Type: Mixed Brigade
- Role: Home Defence
- Size: Four battalions: The 1st, 2nd, 3rd and 4th
- Part of: 11th Division (1936–1939)
- Garrison/HQ: Madrid
- Nickname: Brigada Lister
- Engagements: Spanish Civil War

Commanders
- Notable commanders: Enrique Líster

The First Mixed Brigade (Spanish: 1.ª Brigada Mixta), also known as Brigada Lister, was a mixed brigade of the Spanish Republican Army in the Spanish Civil War. It was disbanded on 9 February 1939.

== History ==
The First Mixed Brigade was established from the Fifth Regiment on 10 October 1936 in Alcalá de Henares as a result of the reorganization of the Spanish Republican Armed forces. It was put under the command of Communist commander Enrique Lister. The first combat action of the First Mixed Brigade was the Battle of Seseña. It would suffer many losses in the Battle of Brunete, including its Cuban brigade commander Alberto Sánchez, as well as a great number of officers and Chief of Staff Major Emilio Conejo. Later the First Mixed Brigade would see action in the Aragon Offensive, the Battle of the Ebro and the Catalonia Offensive.

=== Central Front ===
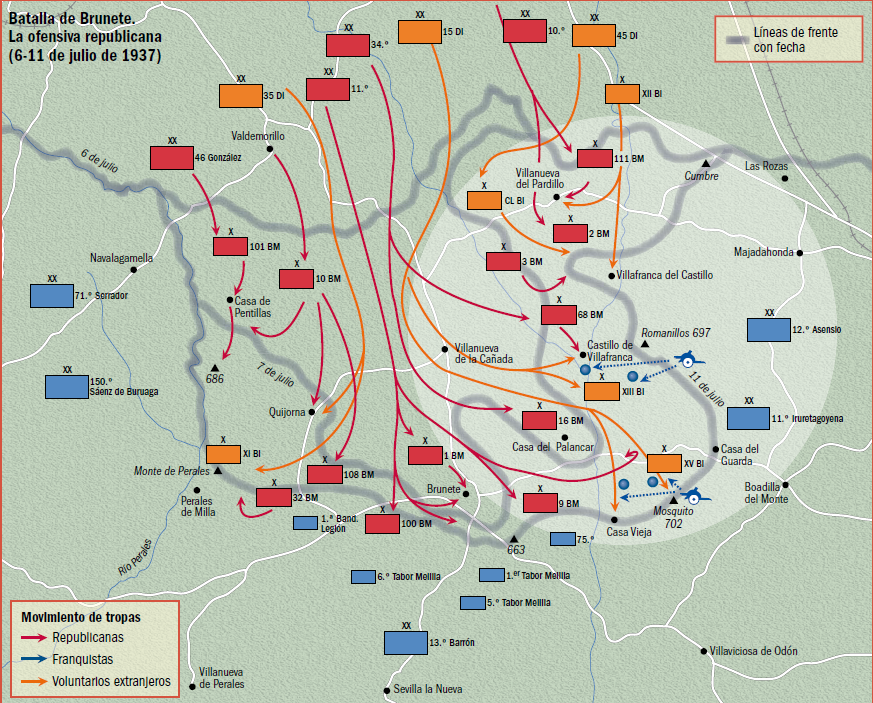
Map of the Republican attack at Brunete. 6 - 11 Julio 1937.

During the Siege of Madrid it was posted in Vallecas, where, with great losses, it helped repulse the attacks of the Army of Africa against the capital. Following this combat it was transferred to the left bank of the Manzanares River. At that time its size grew to eight battalions, being then split when the 1.ª Brigada Bis was established. The 1.ª Brigada Bis would later be renamed as the 9th Mixed Brigade.

On 19 February the First Mixed Brigade was sent to attack the Cerro de los Ángeles where the rebels had established its positions and were firing upon the surrounding area, but although it managed to gain some terrain the attack failed.

On 3 February it attacked the rebel positions in Villaverde Bajo, but it went back to the capital in order to take part in the Battle of Jarama. On 8 February it was near Vaciamadrid where on 19 February it began an assault at El Pingarrón hill; there it occupied the enemy trenches on four occasions, being finally repulsed in all attacks. During the Jarama combats many officers —including all battalion commanders— as well as a great number of soldiers were killed and the unit had to be reconstituted in the rearguard.

In March 1937 the brigade took part with success in the Battle of Guadalajara and in April it was sent again to attack the Cerro de los Ángeles, ending again in failure. In May it took part in a small offensive operation south of Toledo.

On 5 July the First Mixed Brigade infiltrated the rebel lines near Brunete. Two days later it occupied Villanueva de la Cañada and continued the advance. But towards the end of the month it had to retreat, along with the remainders of the 11th Division.

=== Aragon Front ===
After a short period of rest the brigade was transferred to Aragón together with the remainder of the V Army Corps. On 24 August it took part in the Zaragoza Offensive attacking the Fuentes de Ebro sector in successive assaults without being able to make significant progress. The "José Díaz Battalion" commander and his commissar died during these combats.

In December the First Mixed Brigade was sent to the Battle of Teruel where it repeated the same maneuver as in Brunete, infiltrating enemy lines following the 9th and 100th mixed brigades with the mission to take Concud and cut the Francoist rearguard. But the brigade lost its way and instead of circling the village, it ended up attacking it frontally, being immediately repulsed and suffering heavy casualties. Even so, by the afternoon it was able to occupy the place. After conquering Teruel, the First Mixed Brigade was sent to a rearguard position together with the remainder of the 11th Division in order to recover following the heavy losses that had been inflicted on these units.

In the spring of 1938 the First Mixed Brigade took part in the Aragón Campaign, but with limited success. Even though it tried to stop the enemy advance in the sector between Calanda and the Valdealgorfa road junction, the collapse of the whole front forced it to retreat.

=== Last actions in Catalonia ===
By April, although the 1st Mixed Brigade was stuck in Catalonia together with other republican forces, it had managed not to become cut off from its division after the hasty retreat. In May it was sent as strategic reserve for the failed Balaguer Offensive, seeing no combat action. By then the command of the brigade had been reorganized and the unit had been re-equipped.

On 25 July the unit crossed the Ebro, taking part in the battle that would last the following four months. After conquering Móra d'Ebre, it arrived to the Pàndols Range defensive line and later it reached the Barranco de Santa Magdalena. But by 15 August it lost that outpost retreating again to the Pàndols Range, where it held its position until the end of the battle. At the beginning of November it was still in the southern bank of the Ebro, having suffered great losses in manpower and equipment. The commandment of the unit was changed again, being entrusted to major José Montalvo.

When the Francoist offensive against Catalonia began on 23 December 1938, the 1st Mixed Brigade was in the Garrigues area waiting to be reorganized, but it was sent to the Battle of the Segre front in order to plug a breach in the republican lines. For a while it managed to stop the offensive of the Fascist Italian Corpo Truppe Volontarie near Les Borges Blanques, but by the beginning of January 1939 it had to retreat towards the north. By 3 February it reached Girona, and on 5 February it still held fast against the Francoist pressure by the banks of the Ter River. Nevertheless, on 9 February in the evening it crossed the French border at Portbou and became disbanded.

== Commanders ==
- Commanders in Chief
  - Enrique Líster
  - Manuel López Iglesias
  - Alberto Sánchez
  - Francisco del Cacho Villarroig
  - Domingo Hortelano Hortelano
  - Eduardo Zamora Conde
  - José Arévalo
  - José Montalvo
- Commissars. All the commissars of the 1st Mixed Brigade belonged to the Communist Party of Spain (PCE)
  - Miguel Puente (political commissar)
  - Santiago Álvarez Gómez
  - José Sevil Sevil
  - Ángel Barcia Galeote

== See also ==
- Fifth Regiment
- Mixed Brigades
