= Battle of Seseña =

1936 battle of the Spanish Civil War

Coordinates: 40°6′13″N 3°41′53″W

- Part of the Spanish Civil War
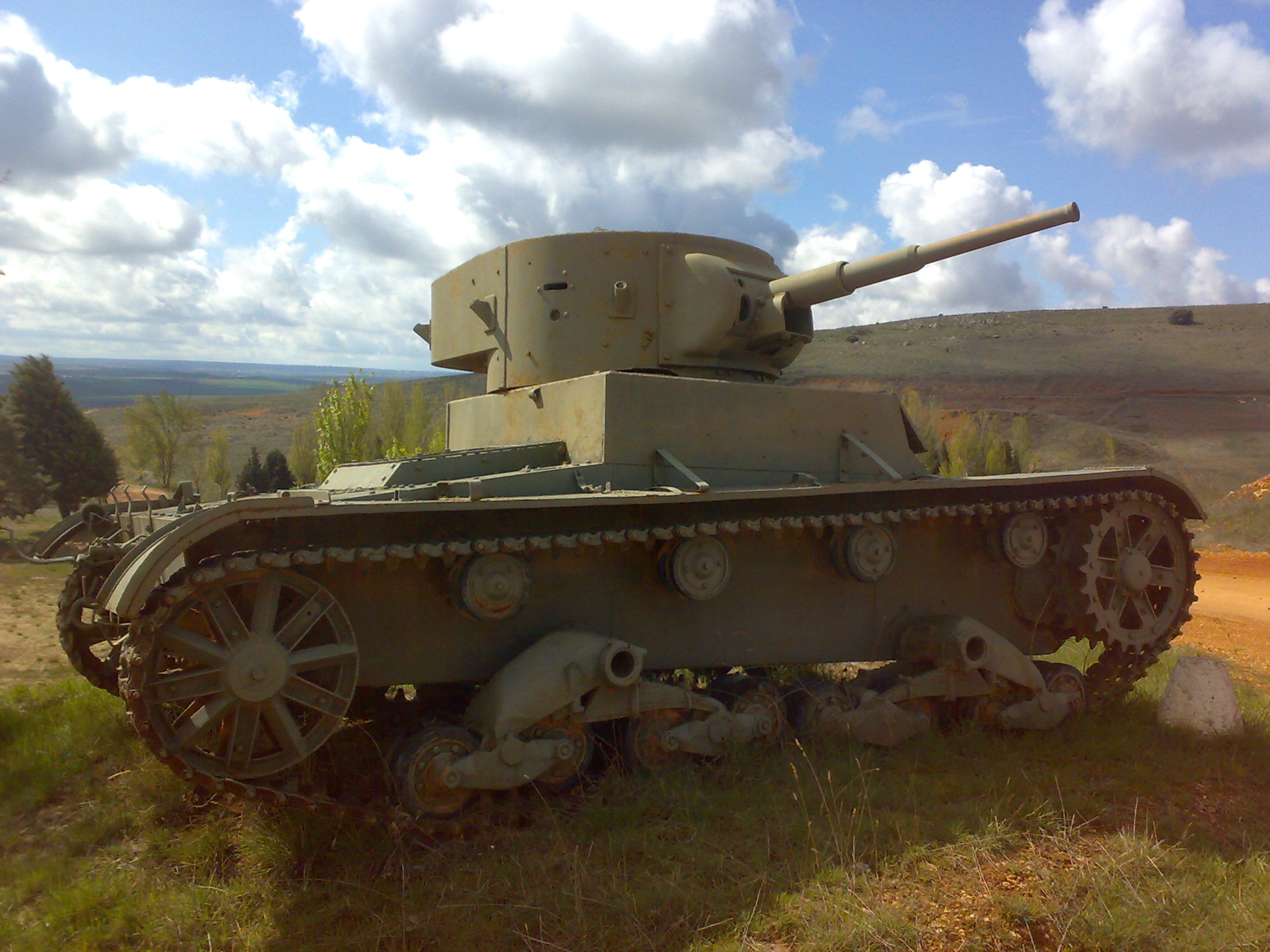
- T-26 mod. 1933 as used by the Spanish Republican Army, near Salamanca, Spain.
Date	October 29, 1936
Location	Seseña, Toledo, Spain
Result	Nationalist victory

Belligerents
(Spain) Spanish Republic; Soviet Union	(Francoist Spain) Nationalist Spain; Italy

Commanders and leaders
(Spain) Enrique Líster (Spain) Ildefonso Puigdendolas (executed) (Soviet Union) Pols Armāns	(Francoist Spain) Félix Monasterio

Units involved
1st Mixed Brigade	1st Tank Company; Moroccan regulares

Strength
Around 3,800 men 15 T-26 tanks	One cavalry column At least 11 Italian L3/33 tankettes

Casualties and losses
8 dead (Note: 4 Soviet tankers and 4 Spanish tankers); 6 wounded 3 tanks destroyed 3 tanks damaged	Nationalist claim: 13 dead 60 wounded 1 tankette destroyed 1 tankette disabled 10 trucks destroyed Soviet claim: 600 dead 11 tankettes destroyed
- 3 civilians killed 7 civilians injured

The Battle of Seseña was a Republican-Soviet assault on the Nationalist stronghold of Seseña, near Toledo, 30 km south of Madrid in October 1936 during the Spanish Civil War. After the fall of Talavera de la Reina and Toledo in September 1936, the Nationalist troops pushed towards Madrid and in October they were 30 km from the city. The Republican government which had received new Soviet weapons decided to launch a counteroffensive in order to stop the Nationalist offensive at Seseña. The attack failed and the Nationalists resumed their advance towards Madrid. The battle is notable for being the first time that massive tank warfare was seen in the Spanish War and for the use by Nationalist troops of Molotov cocktails against Soviet T-26 tanks.

== Background ==
The professional troops of the Spanish Army of Africa had started their drive to Madrid in August 1936. Equipped with modern weapons they had received from Germany and Italy (Ju 52 and Savoia SM-81 planes, and Italian L3/35 tankettes), the Nationalist troops, had defeated the government militias in the battles of Mérida, Badajoz, Sierra de Guadalupe and Talavera de la Reina, and had occupied Toledo on September 27, 1936. In late October 1936 the Nationalists took several towns near Madrid (Torrejon de Velasco, Seseña, Torrejón de la Calzada and Griñon), breaking the first defensive line of Madrid.

Meanwhile, the Republican government had requested aid and weapons from France in order to defeat the Nationalist forces and the president of the French Republic, Léon Blum, initially decided to send help because a Nationalist victory could damage the international position of France. Nevertheless, on July 25, 1936 Blum decided not to send weapons to the Republic, because the opposition of the British government and the French right., and on August 8, 1936 decided to close the frontier, Then, the Spanish government decided to buy weapons from the Soviet Union. The first Soviet ship with weapons reached Cartagena on October 15, 1936. On 28 October 1936, the Republican prime minister Largo Caballero decided to launch a counter-offensive with the recently arrived Soviet weapons in order to detain the Nationalists advance towards Madrid.

== The battle ==
On October 29, 1936, the Spanish Republican Army launched an attack against the Nationalist-held town of Seseña. The Republicans attacked with a force of 15 T-26 tanks, armed with a 45mm cannon, led by a Latvian tank specialist, Captain Pols Armāns, and driven by Soviets with Spanish gunners, and the 1st Mixed Brigade, a newly established mixed brigade led by Enrique Líster. Opposing them, the Nationalists had a force of cavalry led by colonel Monasterio, Moroccan regulares and some Italian L3/33 tankettes supported by a battery of 65 mm cannons. They also deployed naval infantry and marines, and a battery of 105 mm Schneider guns. The Soviet tanks were massed together for a shock attack and entered in Seseña. Armans claimed that the Soviet tanks destroyed two infantry battalions, two cavalry squadrons, ten 75 mm guns, two tankettes and 20-30 trucks. One tank lost a track and was disabled, either after ramming a vehicle blocking Seseña's main street, being struck by an improvised explosive device or being hit by a 105 mm artillery round from a Schneider howitzer. The immobilised T-26 was eventually set on fire and destroyed, with its entire crew killed, two of them after dismounting.

The tanks crossed Seseña and reached Esquivias; nevertheless, the Mixed Brigade of Lister never entered into the town and the tank force had to retreat after coming under heavy artillery fire from the nearby Santa Bárbara hill and a counterattack by a Nationalist column equipped with a 75 mm gun. Mikhail Koltsov, a Soviet journalist at Seseña said: "Lister...explained, a grimace upon his face, that his units, had been moving well at first, but after 1,500 metres, they had felt tired and sat down...". Furthermore, the Nationalists managed to destroy three T-26 tanks, most of them with Molotov cocktails and another with 75 mm gunfire in Esquivias, where the Soviet tanks were temporarily encircled before withdrawing to Borox. Three more were damaged by the same means. The T-26s in Esquivias destroyed a L3/33 tankette carrying a flamethrower and disabled by ramming another one that was later recovered by the rebels. The same sources acknowledge the loss of 10 trucks. Four Soviet and four Republican Spanish tankers were killed in action, and other six wounded, while Nationalist sources report 13 killed and 60 wounded, plus three civilians killed and other seven injured. The same day, the Republican army, led by Colonel Ildefonso Puigdendolas, launched another assault against the nearby town of Illescas, but the attack was beaten off. Puigdendolas was killed by his own men when trying to prevent desertion.

== Aftermath ==
The attack failed, because the Spanish Republican infantry had no training to operate with tanks, but the Soviet tanks were shown to be effective. According to Thomas, one Soviet tank destroyed 11 Italian tankettes. Rebel sources reported one tankette destroyed and another disabled and later recovered. The same day a squadron of Soviet Tupolev SB bombers attacked Seville. Because the arrival of the Soviet weapons Nazi Germany decided to increase their aid to the Nationalists and to organize the Legion Condor.

The Nationalists resumed their offensive, Getafe (13 km south of Madrid) fell on November 4 and on November 8 the Nationalists started their frontal assault on Madrid. Nevertheless, Mola decided to retire a part of their troops from the assault on Madrid, in order to reinforce the flanks, because he feared another tank attack.

== See also ==
- List of Spanish Republican military equipment of the Spanish Civil War
- List of Spanish Nationalist military equipment of the Spanish Civil War

== Bibliography ==
- Beevor, Antony. (2006). The Battle for Spain. The Spanish civil war, 1936–1939. Penguin Books. London. ISBN 978-0-14-303765-1.
- Jackson, Gabriel. (1967). The Spanish Republic and the Civil War, 1931–1939. Princeton University Press. Princeton.
- Preston, Paul. (2006). The Spanish Civil War. Reaction, revolution & revenge. Harper Perennial. London. ISBN 978-0-00-723207-9 ISBN 0-00-723207-1
- Thomas, Hugh. (2001) The Spanish Civil War. Penguin Books. London. ISBN 978-0-14-101161-5
