= Milicia Popular =

Spanish Socialist Newspaper

Milicia Popular (Spanish: [mi.ˈli.sja po.pu.ˈlaɾ] transl. People's Militia) was a Communist newspaper, which served as a mouthpiece for the Loyalist Fifth Regiment, published from July 26, 1936 to January 24, 1937. It was published by Benigno Rodríguez. Notable contributors include Eduardo Ugarte.
