= Enrique Castro Delgado =

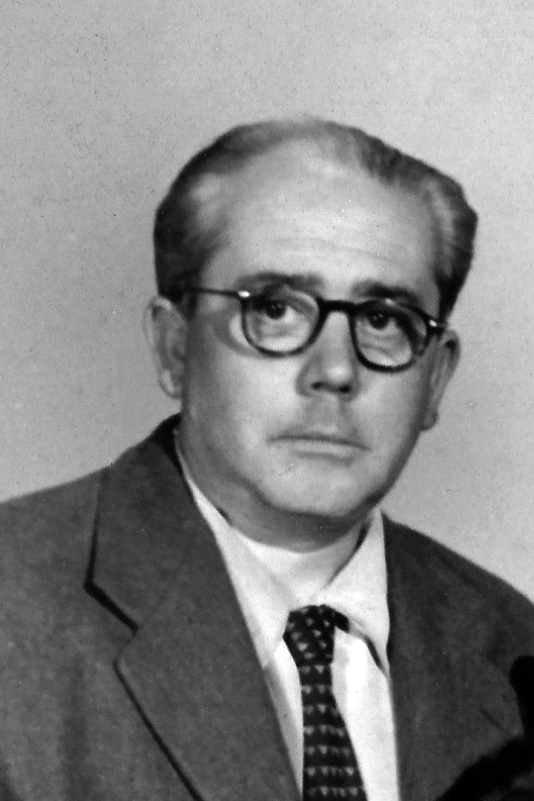
Enrique Castro in Mexico in 1951.

Enrique Castro Delgado (Madrid , 1907 - Madrid, January 2, 1965) was a Spanish communist leader and soldier.

During the Spanish Civil War, as a member of the Communist Party of Spain (PCE) he served, in July of 1936, as the first commander of the Fifth Regiment and chief editor of Mundo Obrero, the Communist party newspaper in Madrid. Subsequently he was the director of the Institute of Agrarian Reform in the Republican government, chief of operations of the Madrid Defense Council in November of 1936, and in 1937 a subcommissar in the General Commissariat of War. Starting in 1933 and then between July 1936 and March 1939 he served on the communist party's central committee.

After the Spanish Civil War he went into exile in France and then Soviet Union. As a representative of the PCE he was a member of the Comintern. In 1944 due to internal struggles within the Spanish communist party he was pushed aside from leadership positions by Dolores Ibárruri (La Pasionaria) and expelled from the party. He moved to Mexico where he attempted to form a non-Moscow aligned alternative communist party. He returned to Spain in 1963 with permission from Francisco Franco. Before his death in 1965 he wrote several works which were critical of communism.

== Works ==
- (1937) Balance y perspectivas de nuestra guerra. Barcelona: Partido Communisto de España, Comision Nacional de Agit-Prop
- (1950) J'ai perdu la foi à Moscoú. Paris: Gallimard.
- (1960) Hombres made in Moscu. Mexico City: Publications Mañana.
