= 71st Mixed Brigade =

- 71.ª Brigada Mixta
- Active: January 1937–March 1939
- Country: Spain
- Allegiance: (Second Spanish Republic) Republican faction
- Branch: Spanish Republican Army
- Type: Infantry
- Size: Brigade
- Engagements: Spanish Civil War: Battle of Guadalajara

Commanders
- Notable commanders: Eduardo Rubio Funes

The 71st Mixed Brigade was a unit of the Spanish Republican Army that participated in the Spanish Civil War, deployed on the Guadalajara front.

== History ==
The unit was created in January 1937 from the militarization of the "Espartaco", "Apoyo" or "Alicante Rojo" militia battalions, constituting in its place the 71st Mixed Brigade. The unit was placed in the 12th Division and sent to the Torija sector on the Guadalajara front. At the beginning of March, after the CTV attack in this area, the 71st Mixed Brigade fully intervened in the battle of Guadalajara. Before the enemy push, on March 8 the "Alicante Rojo" battalion had to withdraw up to km. 103 of highway N-II. During those battles, the brigade suffered serious losses – the 281st and 282nd battalions added more than 600 casualties. (Note: Among these casualties, the chief of the 281st battalion and the chief of its 4th company, militia captain Agustín Batré González, both died.)

After the fighting the unit was withdrawn to Madrid to undergo a reorganization. It was briefly attached to the 11th and 17th divisions, although it eventually returned to the 12th Division. The 71st Mixed Brigade remained for the rest of the war at the Guadalajara front, dissolving itself on March 27, 1939.

== Publications ==
The brigade edited a publication, "Alicante Rojo", directed by Juan Francisco Alted.

== Command ==
Commanders

- Infantry Commander Eduardo Rubio Funes;

Commissars

- Antonio Barea Arenas, of the CNT;
- Carlos Codes Guerra;

Chief of Staff

- Militia Captain José M. Navarro Abad;

== Bibliography ==
- Álvarez, Santiago (1989). Los comisarios políticos en el Ejército Popular de la República (in Spanish). Ediciós do Castro.
- Engel, Carlos (1999). Historia de las Brigadas Mixtas del Ejército Popular de la República (in Spanish). Madrid: Almena. 84-922644-7-0.
- Flaquer Montequi, Rafael (1994). La opinión pública alicantina durante la Guerra Civil (1936-1939) (in Spanish). Madrid: Universidad Autónoma de Madrid.
- Llarch, Joan (1976). Cipriano Mera. Un anarquista en la guerra de España (in Spanish). Euros.
- Ramos, Vicente (1972). La guerra civil (1936-1939) en la provincia de Alicante (in Spanish). Alicante: Biblioteca Alicantina.
- Zaragoza, Cristóbal (1983). Ejército Popular y Militares de la República, 1936-1939 (in Spanish). Barcelona: Ed. Planeta.
