= Pedro Mateo Merino =

Pedro Mateo Merino (1912–2000) was a Spanish Republican Army colonel in the Spanish Civil War.

He fought at the Battle of the Ebro where as a Militia Major he led the 35th Division, replacing General Karol Świerczewski (General Walter).

He later spent time in exile in the USSR, Czechoslovakia and Cuba.
