= Church of San Francisco de Sales (Madrid) =

- Iglesia de San Francisco de Sales (Spanish)
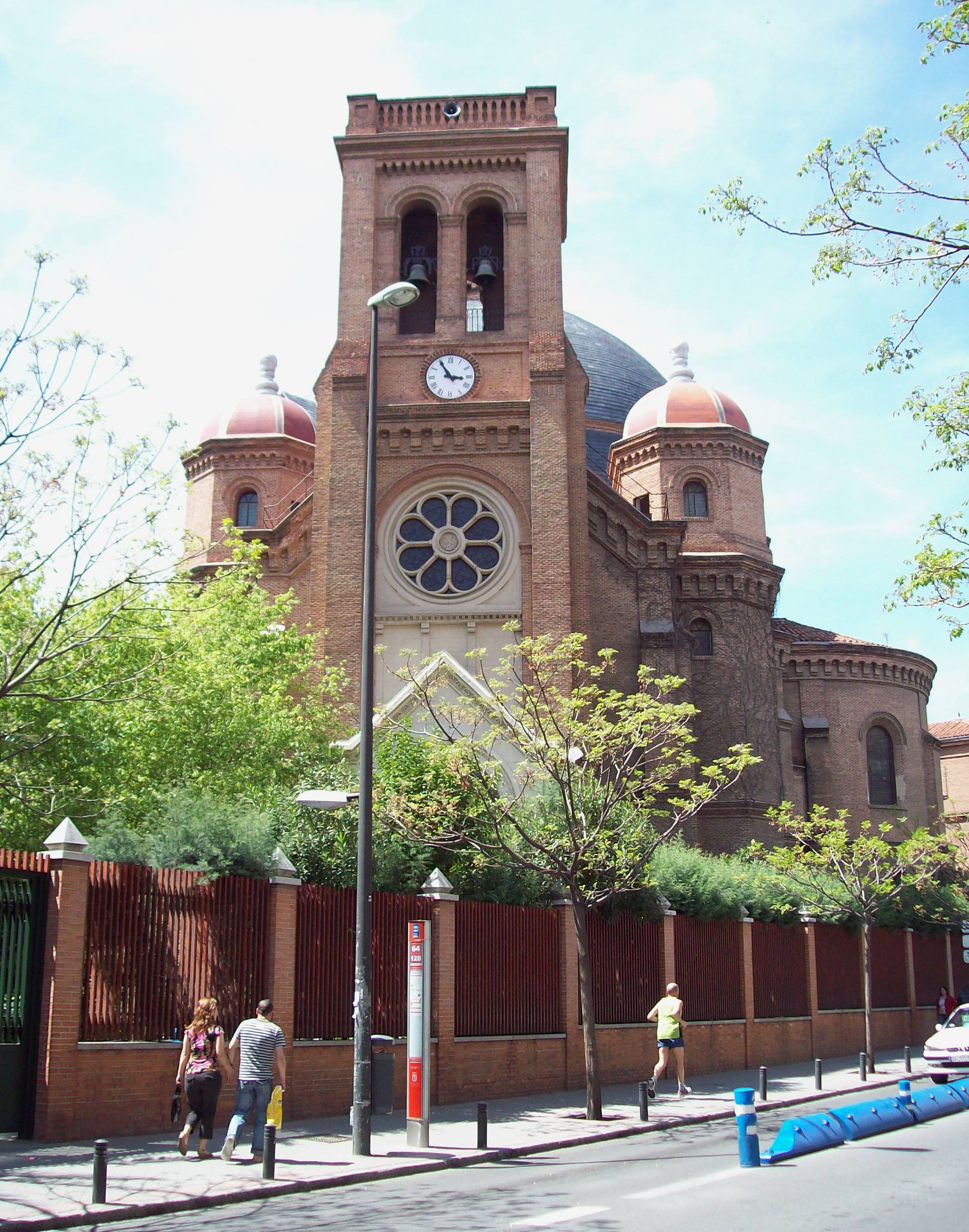

- Location within Spain
- 40.454517°N 3.703783°W
- Location: Madrid, Spain

Spanish Cultural Heritage
- Official name: Iglesia de San Francisco de Sales
- Type: Non-movable
- Criteria: Monument
- Designated: 1996
- Reference no.: RI-51-0009568

The Church of San Francisco de Sales (Spanish: Iglesia de San Francisco de Sales) is a church located in Madrid, Spain. It was declared Bien de Interés Cultural in 1996.

== History ==
At the beginning of the Spanish Civil War the Fifth Regiment used the building of the Church of San Francisco de Sales as its headquarters.

== See also ==
- Catholic Church in Spain
- List of oldest church buildings
