= Alberto Sánchez Pérez =

Spanish painter and sculptor

Alberto Sánchez Pérez (8 April 1895, Toledo, Spain – 12 October 1962, Moscow) was a Spanish painter and sculptor.

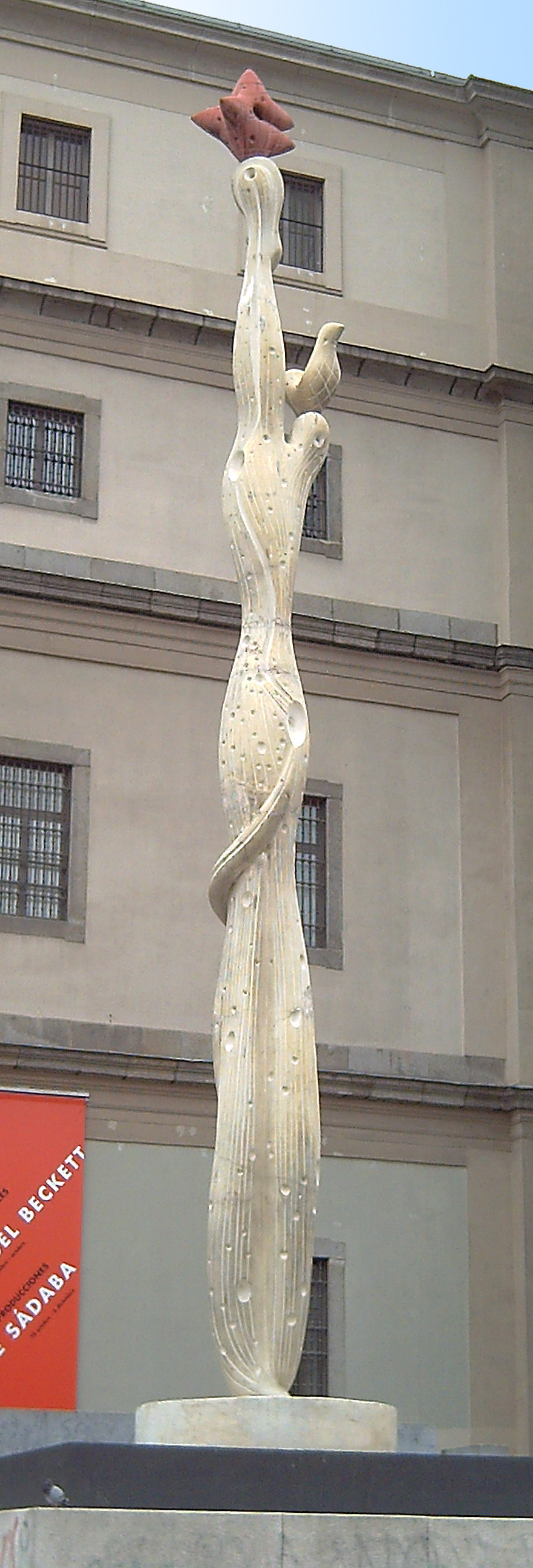
A copy of the 1937 sculpture "The Spanish People have a Path Leading to a Star", at the entrance to the Museo Nacional Centro de Arte Reina Sofía.

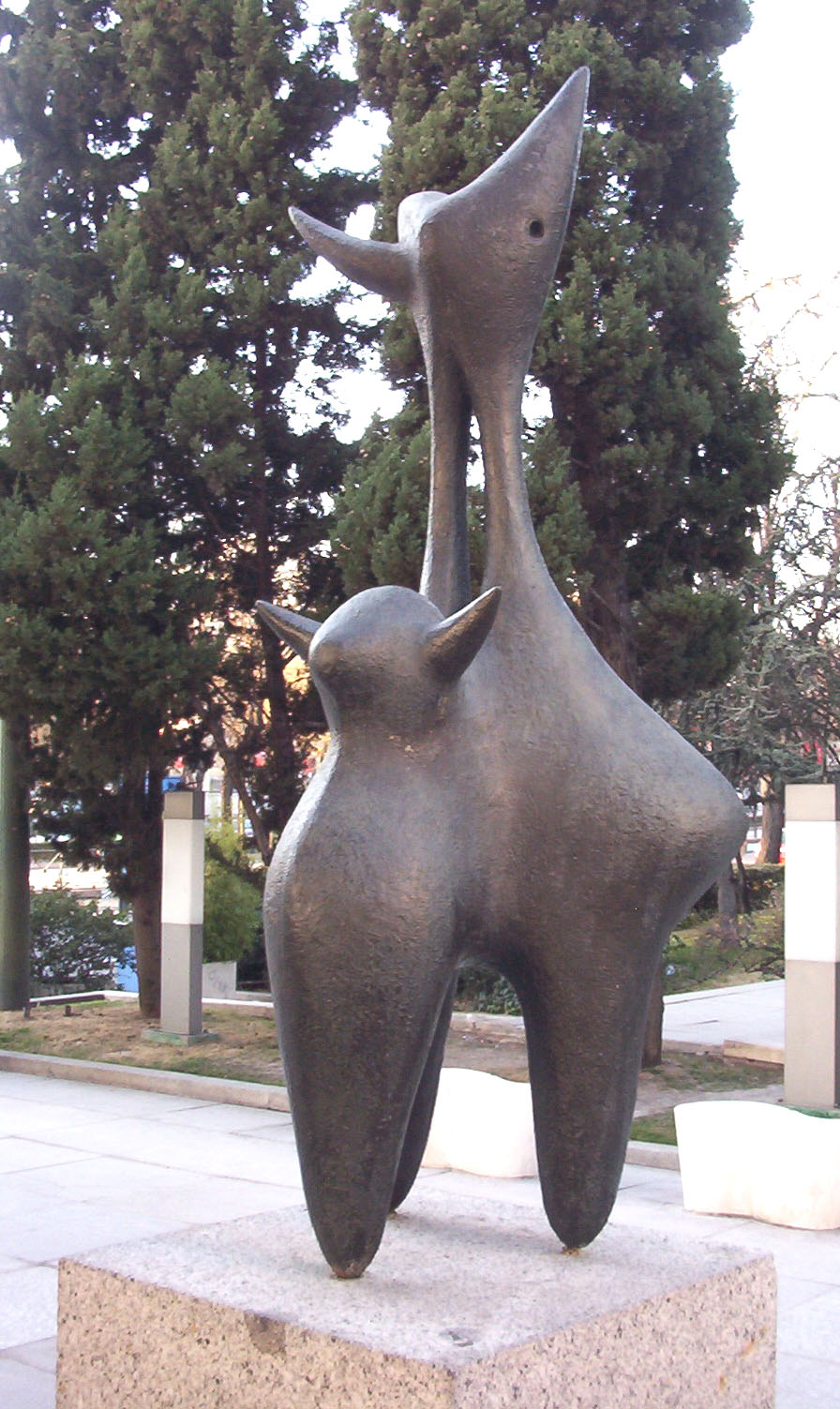
Toros ibéricos. Escultura en el Museo Arte Público de Madrid, paseo de la Castellana

His early work was influenced by Cubism. In 1927, together with Benjamín Palencia, he founded the artistic group Escuela de Vallecas. He made stage sets for Lorca's La Barraca Theatre. He exhibited with Picasso in the pavilion of the Spanish Republic at the International Exhibition in Paris (1937), which took place at the height of the Spanish Civil War. At the entrance to the Spanish pavilion, visitors were greeted by his sculpture The Path of the Spanish People Leading to the Star. He fought with the Republican Fifth Regiment in the Spanish Civil War. His painting, Toros ibéricos is in the Museo Arte Público de Madrid.

From September 1938 he lived in the Soviet Union. He designed the play Devil's Bridge by Alexei Tolstoy, directed by Alexander Tairov im 1939. In the Second World War he was evacuated with his family to Bashkiria. Later he worked on the scenery for Grigory Kozintsev's film Don Quixote. He designed productions of the Romen Theater in Moscow (The Wonderful Shoemaker and Lorca's Bloody Wedding), collaborated with the Stanislavsky Theater, the Mayakovsky Theater, etc. In 1959, an exhibition of his scenographic works was held.

He was buried at the Vvedenskoye Cemetery in Moscow.

== Sources ==
- Martin, Peter. Presentación de Alberto Sánchez Pérez, escultor (1895–1962). Corvina. Budapest, 1964. (Consultado en la Bibl.Tomás Navarro Tomás del CSIC (Madrid), en 2011)
- Chávarri Porpeta, Raúl. Mito y realidad de la Escuela de Vallecas. Ibérico Europea de Ediciones. Madrid, 1975. ISBN 978-84-256-0280-1
- Azcoaga, Enrique. Alberto. Ministerio de Educación y Ciencia, Dirección General del Patrimonio Artístico y Cultural, Madrid, 1977
- Plaza Chillón, José Luis. "El largo y doloroso epílogo de un artista desterrado: el exilio de Alberto en la U.R.S.S. (1938-1962)". Patronato "Niceto Alcalá-Zamora y Torres". Córdoba, 2005
- Several authors, Catálogo de la exposición Forma, palabra y materia en la poética de Vallecas. Diputación de Alicante (Alicante, 2011).ISBN 978-84-96979-82-6
