= Enrique Líster =

Spanish military officer and communist

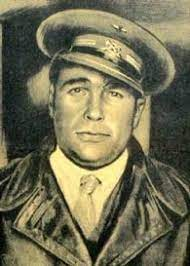
- Líster in 1936
- Born: Jesús Lister Forján; 21 April 1907; Ameneiro, Corunna, Kingdom of Spain
- Died: 8 December 1994 (aged 87); Madrid, Spain
- Military career
- Allegiance: Second Spanish Republic; Soviet Union; Democratic Federal Yugoslavia
- Branch: Spanish Republican Army (1936-1939); Red Army (1939-1946); Yugoslav People's Army (1946)
- Service years: 1936–1946
- Rank: General
- Commands: Fifth Regiment; 1st Brigada Mixta; 11th Division; 5th Army Corps
- Conflicts: 1931 Cuban Revolt; Spanish Civil War; Second World War

Enrique Líster Forján (21 April 1907 – 8 December 1994) was a Spanish communist politician and military officer. He participated in the Spanish Civil War as an officer in the People's Army of the Republic and rose to the rank of major general in the Red Army of the USSR during World War II.

== Early life ==
Líster was born in 1907 at Ameneiro, A Coruña. A stonemason, he spent his adolescence in Cuba, before returning in 1925 and joining the Communist Party of Spain (PCE). His involvement with the revolutionary movement forced his exile until 1931, when the Second Spanish Republic was proclaimed. In August 1931, he took part in the Cuban uprising against Gerardo Machado, who had declared martial law. Between 1932 and 1935, Líster received training in the Frunze Military Academy, one of the most respected in the Soviet Union.

== Spanish Civil War ==
In 1936, when the Spanish Civil War started, he joined the Fifth Regiment. The following year, as a high-ranking army officer, commanding the 11th division of the republican army, Líster was instrumental in the defense of Madrid and other important military actions. In October 1936 he led a mixed brigade in the ill-fated Republican counteroffensive at Seseña. As a divisional commander, he helped stall the Nationalist attack along the Jarama and played a significant role within the successful Republican counterattack at the Battle of Guadalajara.

Líster's reputation as a competent military commander is largely based on his role as commander of the 11th Division, which was involved in some of the most important battles in Guadalajara, Brunete, Belchite and Teruel. Those brigades under his control rapidly became special battalions which took care of special operations. Historian Antony Beevor, however, cites 4,300 casualties out of a strength of 13,353 at Brunete. Beevor quotes the chief Soviet advisor as reporting that Líster's division collapsed and 'lost its head and fled. We managed with great difficulty to bring it under control and prevent soldiers from fleeing their units. The toughest of repressive measures had to be applied. About 400 of those fleeing were shot on 24 July.' Later, he led the V Army Corps in the battle of the Ebro and in the Catalonia Offensive.

The 11th Division did, however suffer a severe setback when it failed to capture Fuentes de Ebro in the Republican offensive in Aragon in August 1937. The International Tank Regiment lost the majority of its tanks. This loss led to mutual hatred between Líster and Juan Modesto, commander of the 5th Corps (of which the 11th Division formed a part). Modesto held Líster responsible for the losses.

Líster remained defiant as late as September 1938, when defeat for the Republic looked inevitable. Líster claimed that the Nationalist forces remained entirely dissatisfied with the job Franco was doing. He stated:

The enemy rank and file are restive and dissatisfied with the constant deceptions played upon them by Franco and with the conviction that he is incompetent both as a military and political leader.

== Exile ==
After the end of the Civil War, Líster took refuge in Moscow, later fighting in World War II as a Red Army general. He took part in the relief of Leningrad in January 1944. In 1946 he became general of the Yugoslav People's Army. He also served in the Polish People's Army. According to Christopher Andrew and Oleg Gordievsky, when in late 1959 Fidel Castro's intelligence chief Ramiro Valdés contacted the KGB in Mexico City, the Soviets sent over one hundred mostly Spanish-speaking advisors, including Enrique Líster, to organize the Committees for the Defense of the Revolution in Cuba.

In 1973 he split from the PCE and founded the Spanish Communist Workers' Party (PCOE). A catalyst for the split was the condemnation by the PCE of the Soviet intervention in Czechoslovakia in 1968. Líster returned to Spain in 1977, after Francisco Franco's death, and rejoined the PCE during the Spanish transition to democracy. Following the expulsion of Santiago Carrillo from the PCE in 1986, Líster announced the reintegration and dissolution of the PCOE into the PCE. He died in 1994 in Madrid.

== Works ==
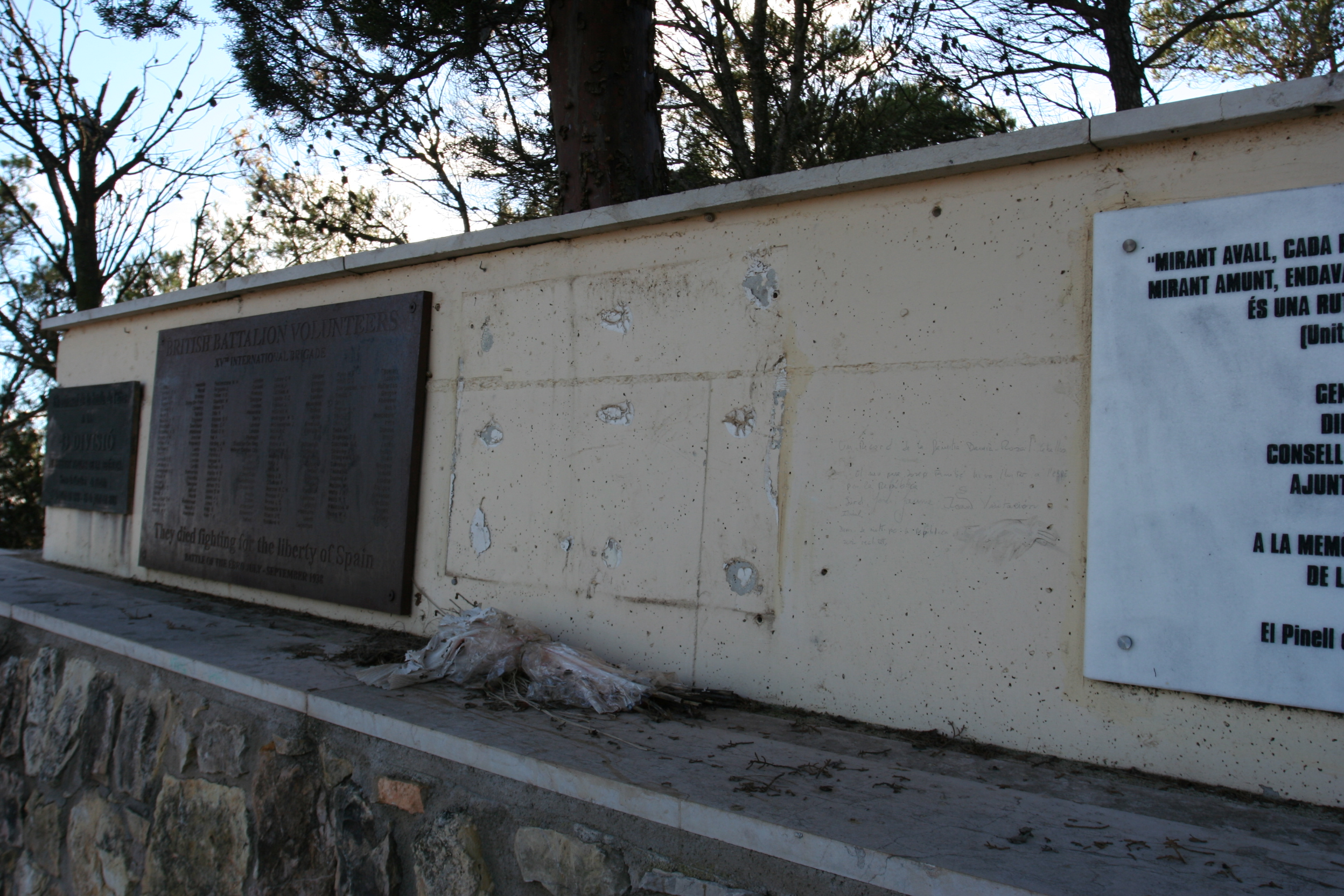
The wall commemorating Republican defenders with empty place where plaque to honour Enrique Líster used to be. It was removed by unknown perpetrators in 2007.

Líster wrote four books, two of them —Nuestra guerra (1966) and Memorias de un luchador (1977)— were about his personal experiences in the Spanish Civil War.

- Nuestra guerra (Our War) 1966
- Memorias de un luchador (Memories of a Fighter) 1977
- ¡Basta! (Enough!) 1970
- Así destruyó Carrillo el PCE (Thus Carrillo destroyed the PCE) 1982

== See also ==
- Antifascist Worker and Peasant Militias (MAOC)

== Bibliography ==
- Líster's stay in Cuba is mentioned in: Gordievsky, Oleg; Andrew, Christopher (1990). KGB: The Inside Story. Hodder & Stoughton. ISBN 0-340-48561-2.
- Líster's qualities as a military leader are discussed in: Beevor, Antony (2006). The Battle For Spain. Phoenix. ISBN 0-7538-2280-6.
