= Santa Olalla =

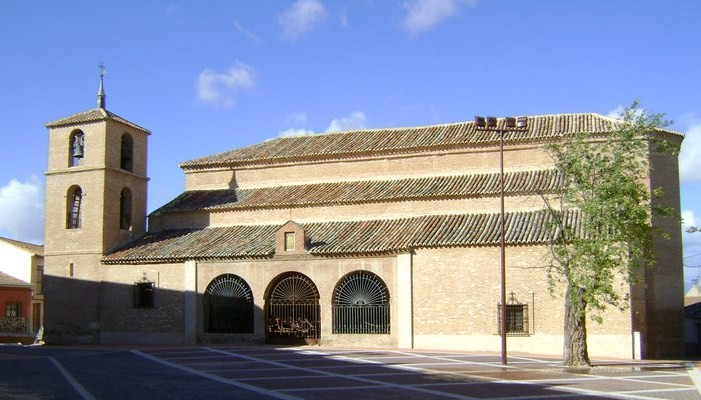
- San Julián church building and square

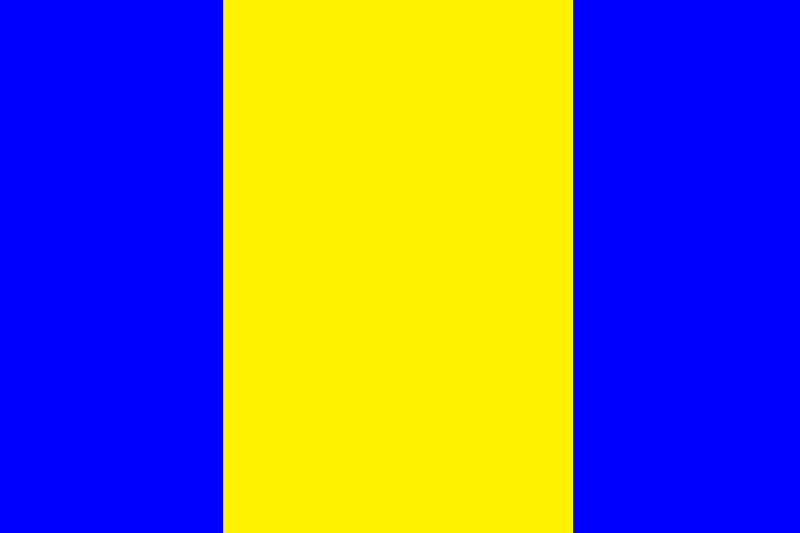
- Flag Coat of arms

- Location in Spain
- Coordinates: 40°1′25″N 4°26′9″W
- Country: Spain
- Autonomous community: Castile-La Mancha
- Province: Toledo
- Comarca: Torrijos

Area
  - Total: 72 km^{2} (28 sq mi)
- Elevation: 492 m (1,614 ft)

Population (2025-01-01)
  - Total: 3,571
  - Density: 50/km^{2} (130/sq mi)
- Time zone: UTC+1 (CET)
  - Summer (DST): UTC+2 (CEST)

Santa Olalla is a village in the province of Toledo and autonomous community of Castile-La Mancha, Spain. According to the 2014 census, the municipality has a population of 3,326 inhabitants.

It is named for Saint Eulalia of Mérida.
