= Pols Armāns =

Russian military personnel

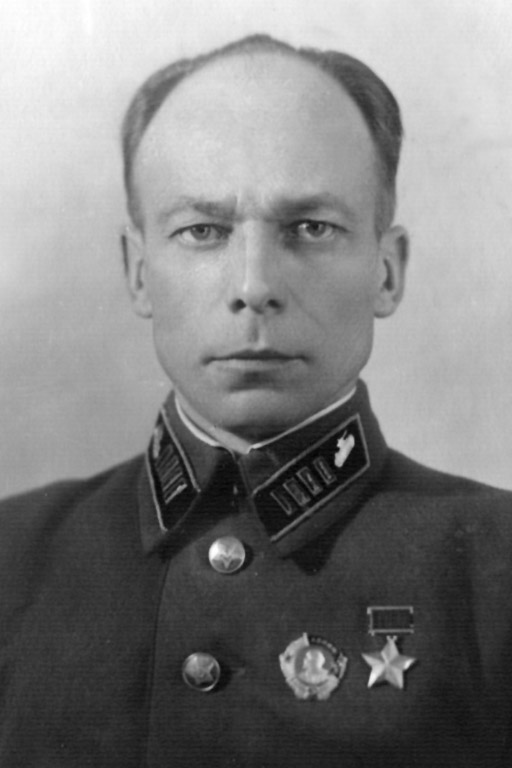
- Nickname: Major Greiser"
- Born: Pauls Tiltiņš; 4 April [O.S. 22 March] 1903; Mittelhof estate, Courland Governorate, Russian Empire
- Died: 7 August 1943 (aged 40) near Porechye, Kirovsky District, Leningrad Oblast, USSR
- Allegiance: Latvia; Soviet Union
- Branch: Tank Troops
- Service years: 1926–1943
- Rank: Colonel
- Commands: 11th Tank Brigade; 122nd Tank Brigade
- Conflicts: Spanish Civil War; World War II
- Awards: Hero of the Soviet Union

Pols Armāns (known also as "Major Greiser"), whose true name was Pauls Tiltiņš (4 April [O.S. 22 March] 1903 – 7 August 1943) was a Soviet officer and the first Red Army tankman to be awarded with title of Hero of Soviet Union. His brother was Alfred Tilton, a Soviet spy and bearer of Order of Lenin.

== Biography ==
Armans was born at April 4 [O.S. March 22] 1903 in Mittelhof estate, Courland Governorate, Russian Empire (now Vidusmuiža, Sesava Parish, Jelgava Municipality, Latvia) in a peasant's family. In 1919 he entered the Komsomol, and in 1920 he became member of the Communist Party. He served for some time in the Latvian Army, in Riga and Daugavpils, in 1923 he enrolled into the University of Latvia. In 1925-1926 he lived in France, studying in École Polytechnique, where he obtained documents on the name of Pols Armāns.

In 1926 Armans emigrated to the USSR and enlisted into the Red Army. In 1928 he graduated from Moscow Infantry School.

Since 1928 till 1930 Armans served as a platoon commander in the 59th Rifle Regiment of the 20th Rifle Division in Leningrad Military District. Then he was relocated into the Moscow Military District as a commander of reconnaissance platoon in the 1st Motorized and Mechanized Regiment of the 1st Experimental Mechanized Brigade. In May 1931 he was again relocated to Transcaucasian Military District to serve as commander of the 1st Armored Car Battalion. Since December 1932 he was a battalion commander in 5th Mechanized Brigade.

In 1935, Armans graduated from Courses for Improvement of Technical Staff at Academy of the WPRA Mechanization and Motorization Program and was sent to the 4th Mechanized Brigade.

In 1936, he volunteered to fight in the Spanish Civil War on the side of Republicans. On October 13 the Soviet freighter Komsomol with T-26 tanks and crews arrived to Cartagena. A training facility was organized in Archena, which was to be used for training of Spanish tank crews. The training started at October 17 and was planned to continue for 15 days. But on 26 October because of worsening of situation at the front near Madrid, an order was issued to organize a tank company to defend the Spanish capital. Personnel was mostly Soviet, with several Spaniards for interaction with locals and Spanish infantry. Pols Armans was made the commander of this company. He was known as "captain", later "major Greiser".

Armans showed outstanding boldness, initiative and composure in action. He participated in the first tank battle of Soviet tanks.

=== Battle of Seseña ===
On October 29 the tank company under command of captain Armans suddenly stroke the enemy at Seseña, 30 km south of Madrid. Armans himself destroyed 3 tanks and a lot of enemy personnel. He continued commanding his company even from a burning tank, after suffering a concussion. For this battle Pols Armans was awarded the title of Hero of Soviet Union on December 31, 1936, by decree of Presidium of the Supreme Soviet of USSR.

During this day Armans' group scattered around two cavalry squadrons and two infantry battalions, disabled 12 cannons, two-three dozens of cargo cars and several tanks. Two of his subordinates - Semyon Osadchy and Nikolai Selitsky - were also awarded the title of Hero of Soviet Union for this action. Osadchy was injured in the battle and died some days later from his wounds. Four other Soviet officers were killed in Seseña, while three T-26s were lost. The Spanish rebels used what later would be known as Molotov cocktails as an antitank weapon.

=== After the Spanish Civil War ===
In January 1937 Armans returned to Soviet Union, he was promoted to major and assigned as commander to 5th Mechanized Brigade. On 5 February 1937, he participated in a conference in Kremlin, dedicated to experience of Spanish Civil War, giving a speech on the lessons of Soviet tank usage. Soon after this Armans was arrested and charged with espionage, he was imprisoned until 21 June 1939, when all charges against him were dropped.

From September 1939 to May 1941, Armans studied in Frunze Military Academy. After graduation he was assigned as deputy commander of the 51st Tank Division.

During the Soviet-German War, Pols Armans was commander of 11th Tank Brigade, and later he became the commander of the armored and mechanized troops of 4th Army. In 1943 he became commander of the 122nd Tank Brigade. He was killed by a sniper on August 7, 1943, during fighting near Porechye village, Kirovsky District, Leningrad Oblast, during the Mga Offensive. He is buried in Volkhov, on Novooktyabrskoe Cemetery.

== Awards ==
- Hero of Soviet Union (December 31, 1936)
- Order of Lenin (December 31, 1936)
- Order of the Patriotic War 1st class (August 9, 1943)
