= Antifascist Worker and Peasant Militias =

Antifascist Worker and Peasant Militias Milicias Antifascistas Obreras y Campesinas
- Active: 1934–1937
- Disbanded: 1937
- Country: Spain
- Allegiance: Second Spanish Republic
- Type: Citizen militia
- Role: Guarding Socialist and Communist offices and protecting leftist leaders.
- Size: 5,000 (est.)
- Engagements: Defence of Madrid (Spanish Civil War)

Commanders
- Notable commanders: Enrique Líster; Juan Guilloto León

Insignia
- Commissar badge
- Colours: Blue and red

The Antifascist Worker and Peasant Militias (Spanish: Milicias Antifascistas Obreras y Campesinas, MAOC) were a militia group founded in the Second Spanish Republic in 1934. Their purpose was to protect leaders of the Communist Party of Spain (PCE) and Unified Socialist Youth (JSU) from the attacks of Fascist militia groups such as the Falange Blueshirts.

The MAOC were especially active in the few months preceding the 1936 coup and the first months of the Spanish Civil War. Many of the members of the Popular Army's Fifth Regiment during the war belonged to the Antifascist Worker and Peasant Militias.

== History ==
Most of the MAOC members belonged to the Unified Socialist Youth, Juventudes Socialistas Unificadas (JSU), youth organization. They received weapons and basic paramilitary training.

Shortly after the Spanish coup of 17 July 1936, the MAOC formed five battalions that took an active part in the defence of Madrid. One of these battalions eventually became the renowned "Fifth Regiment" (5º Regimiento de Milicias Populares), a military unit directly supported by the Communist Party of Spain and intended as a model for other military units in the initial chaotic period of the civil war. In the first critical phase of the war the Communists and Socialists led the implementation of a policy that sought to replace the spontaneous and disorganized bands fighting for the Spanish Republic with loyal, disciplined and militarized units. Thus the MAOC members eventually became integrated in different units of the Spanish Republican Army and their militia became extinct.

The Antifascist Worker and Peasant Militias members used to wear a uniform featuring a light blue shirt and a red tie. The political commissars wore a red star on the shirt's breast pocket.

== See also ==
- Quinto Regimiento
- Spanish Republican Army

== Bibliography ==
- Carlos Rojas, Por qué perdimos la guerra. Barcelona, Ediciones Nauta, 1970
