= Juan Modesto =

Spanish military officer

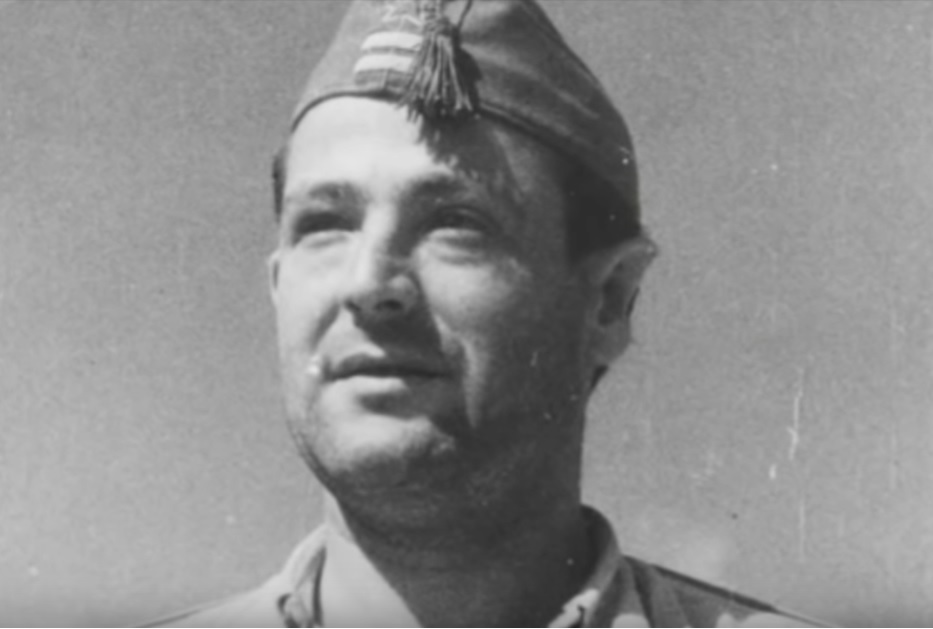
- Born: Juan Guilloto León; 24 September 1906; El Puerto de Santa María, Cádiz, Kingdom of Spain
- Died: 16 April 1969 (aged 62); Prague, Czechoslovakia
- Military career
- Allegiance: Spanish Republic (1936–1939); Soviet Union (1939–1945)
- Branch: Spanish Army; Spanish Republican Army; Red Army
- Service years: 1936–1945
- Rank: Brigadier General
- Nickname: Modesto
- Commands: Fifth Regiment (1936), Army of the North (1937), 5th Army Corps (1937–1938), Army of the Ebro (1938), Army of the Centre (March 1939)
- Conflicts: Spanish Civil War: Siege of Madrid; Second Battle of the Corunna Road; Battle of Jarama; Battle of Belchite; Battle of Brunete; Battle of Teruel; Battle of Ebro; Catalonia Offensive; Second World War

Juan Guilloto León, usually referred to as Modesto or Juan Modesto (24 September 1906 – 16 April 1969), was a Republican army officer during the Spanish Civil War.

== Biography ==
=== Early life ===
Born at El Puerto de Santa María in Cádiz, Juan Guilloto worked at a sawmill before joining the Spanish Army. He served in Morocco, becoming a corporal of the Regulares colonial troops based in Larache.

Juan Guilloto was affiliated with the Communist Party of Spain (PCE) from 1930, and in 1933 he was placed in charge of the Milicias Antifascistas Obreras y Campesinas (MAOC) in Madrid, which constituted a paramilitary force for the Party. He organized the Sindicato de Oficios Varios y el Socorro Rojo, which coordinated relations with the Socorro Rojo Internacional.

=== Spanish Civil War ===
When the Spanish Civil War broke out in July 1936, Juan Guilloto participated in the assault of Cuartel de la Montaña, and the Battle of Guadarrama fought in the Guadarrama Mountain Range. He was one of the leaders of Fifth Regiment, becoming its commander from October 1936 onwards. He fought in Talavera de la Reina, Santa Olalla and Illescas (September 1936), the defense of Madrid and the Second battle of the Corunna Road, as well as in the Battle of Jarama (February 1937).

Juan Guilloto was promoted to lieutenant colonel of the Popular Army and commander of 5th Army Corps, participating in the battles of Belchite, Brunete (July) and Teruel (December 1937 and January 1938). On 26 August 1938, he was promoted to colonel and became head of the Army of the Ebro.

After the fall of Catalonia to the rebel army, Negrín named Modesto general and head of the Central Army on March 2, 1939.

=== The Battles around Madrid ===
At the end of August, he moved to the province of Toledo, where he led a battalion, trying to contain the Franco advance towards Madrid. It was distinguished especially in the fights with the troops of the Army of Africa along the Tagus river during their advance towards Madrid, highlighting his interventions in Talavera, Santa Olalla, Toledo or Illescas. During the fighting in the Talavera-Santa Olalla area, he revealed himself as an authentic military chief by coordinating the actions of the militias and regular units (Guardias de asalto) under his command. In November he stood out again during the siege of Madrid and in January 1939 during the fight for Barcelona.

=== Exile ===
After Casado's coup's, on 6 March Modesto left Spain in an airplane. Then he went to the Soviet Union, whose government recognized his military rank.

During World War II, he served with the Red Army and the Bulgarian Communist forces. Defeated in the struggle with José Díaz for control of the PCE, he went to Prague.

Modesto wrote a book about his experience during the war in the 5th Regiment, titled Soy del Quinto Regimento (English: I am of the Fifth Regiment), published in Paris in 1969. He died in Prague in 1969.

== See also ==
- Antifascist Worker and Peasant Militias (MAOC)
- Eastern Region Army Group (GERO)

== Published works ==
- Modesto, Juan (1978). Soy del Quinto Regimiento: Notas de la Guerra Espanola [I am of the Fifth Regiment: Notes on the Spanish War]. ISBN 8472223639.

== Bibliography ==
- Beevor, Antony. The battle for Spain. The Spanish civil war, 1936-1939. Penguin Books. 2006. London. ISBN 978-0-14-303765-1.
- Jackson, Gabriel. The Spanish Republic and the Civil War, 1931-1939. Princeton University Press. 1967. Princeton. ISBN 978-0-691-00757-1
- Preston, Paul. The Spanish Civil War. Reaction, revolution & revenge. Harper Perennial. 2006. London. ISBN 978-0-00-723207-9 ISBN 0-00-723207-1
- Thomas, Hugh. The Spanish Civil War. Penguin Books. 2001. London. ISBN 978-0-14-101161-5
