= Fuentes de Ebro =

- municipality
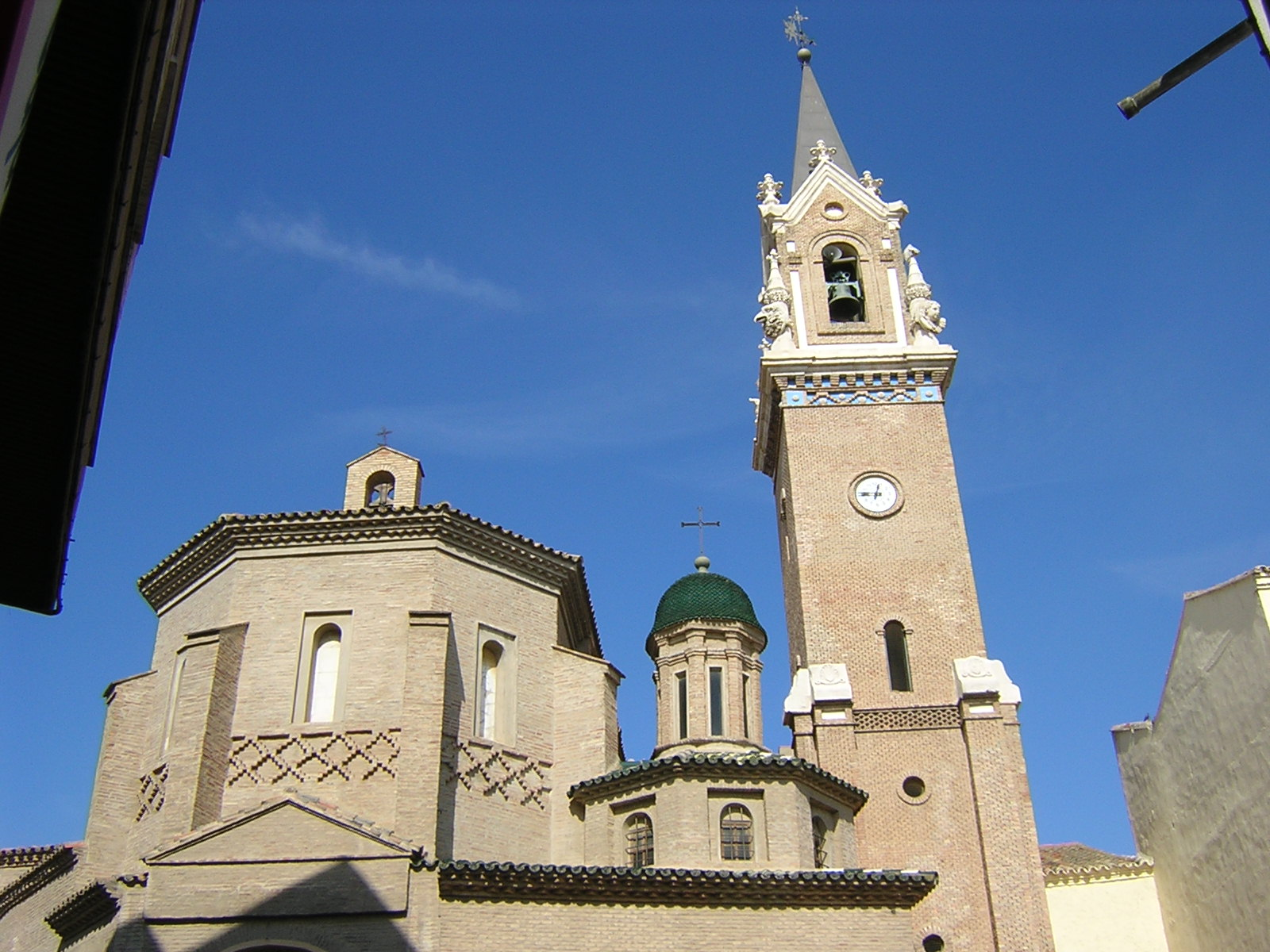

- Flag Coat of arms

- Location within Aragon Location within Spain Location within Europe
- Coordinates: 41°30′41″N 0°37′44″W
- Country: Spain
- Autonomous community: Aragon
- Province: Zaragoza

Area
  - Total: 141 km^{2} (54 sq mi)
- Elevation: 159 m (522 ft)

Population (2025-01-01)
  - Total: 4,862
  - Density: 34.5/km^{2} (89.3/sq mi)
- Time zone: UTC+1 (CET)
  - Summer (DST): UTC+2 (CEST)
- Postal Code: 50740

Fuentes de Ebro (Aragonese: Fuents d’Ebro) is a municipality in the province of Zaragoza, Aragon, Spain. According to the 2005 census (INE), the municipality has a population of 4,086 inhabitants.

== See also ==
- Las Fuentes, Zaragoza
- List of municipalities in Zaragoza
