= Valentín González =

Spanish Army commander

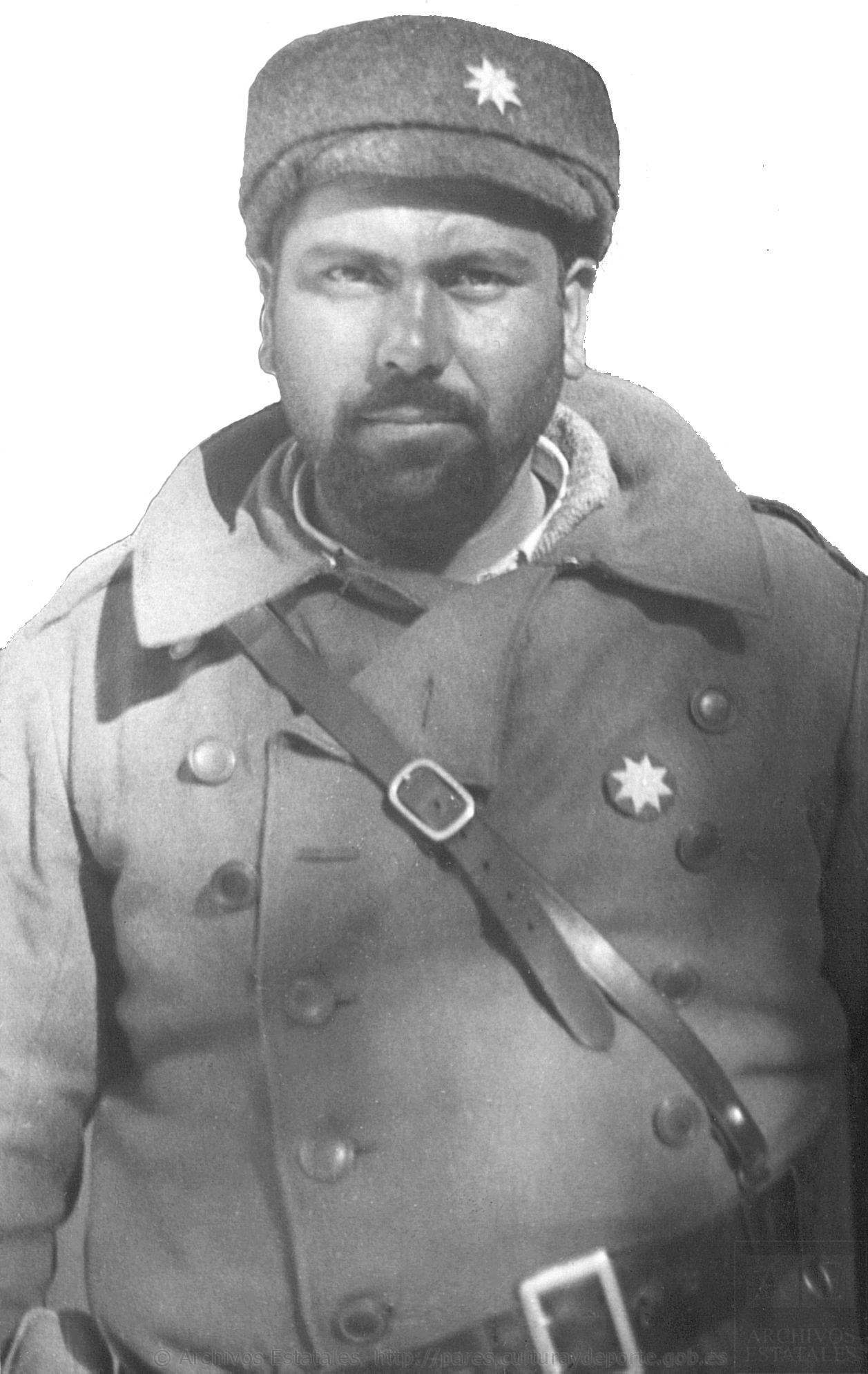
- Born: Valentín González González; 4 November 1904; Malcocinado, Badajoz, Spain
- Died: 20 October 1983 (aged 78); Madrid, Spain
- Military career
- Allegiance: Spanish Republic
- Branch: Spanish Republican Army
- Years of service: 1936–1939
- Rank: Lieutenant colonel
- Nickname: El Campesino (The Peasant)
- Commands: 10th Mixed Brigade; 46th Division
- Conflict: Spanish Civil War

Valentín González González (4 November 1904 – 20 October 1983), popularly known as El Campesino (the Peasant), was a Spanish Republican military commander during the Spanish Civil War.

== Life ==
=== Spanish Civil War ===
Born in Malcocinado, Badajoz, González worked as a miner and was a member of the Communist Party, establishing one of the first militia units to counter Francisco Franco's Nationalist Army upon the outbreak of the Civil War. As a brigade commander, González personally took part in all of the major actions that occurred during the Nationalists' assault on Madrid in 1936. He also commanded formations during the battles of the Corunna Road (December 1936), the Jarama, and Guadalajara (March 1937).

In the summer of 1937, he led the 46th Division in the Battle of Brunete. Heavily promoted as a heroic figure by Soviet propaganda, González was accused by other officers in the Ejercito Popular of being brutal in his treatment of his men, unsuited for modern battle, and an egomaniac.

He led his men in the Battle of Belchite, the Battle of Teruel, and Catalonia. After the Nationalist victory in 1939, he emigrated to the Soviet Union.

=== Soviet Union ===
Along with other exiled Spanish Republican commanders, he was enrolled in the Frunze Military Academy but was expelled for incompetence. He was later imprisoned in Vorkutlag Gulag labor camp with other Spanish Communists. There he worked as a brigadier of miners. The Soviets transferred him to other camps. In 1944 he escaped from Soviet Union to Iran.

In 1951 he published an autobiography, Vida y muerte en la URSS (translated into English a year later as El Campesino: Life and Death in Soviet Russia.)

After the Spanish transition to democracy in 1978, he returned to Spain. He died in Madrid.
