= Saturnino Carod =

Spanish trade unionist

Saturnino Carod Lerín
- Born: 23 February 1903; Moneva, Aragon, Spain
- Died: 7 March 1988 (aged 85); Barcelona, Catalunya
- Military career
- Allegiance: CNT
- Service: Carod-Ferrer Column (1936), South Ebro Column (1936–1937), 25th Division (1937–1939)
- Conflicts: Spanish Civil War

Saturnino Carod Lerín (Moneva, 21 February 1903 – Barcelona, 7 March 1988) was an Aragonese anarchist politician and guerrilla. During the Spanish Civil War he commanded a militia column and later, during World War II he played an active role in the French Resistance.

== Biography ==
He was born in Moneva on 21 February 1903, into a peasant family. He moved to Zaragoza and later to Barcelona, where he worked in construction. There he joined the National Confederation of Labor (CNT), and also learned to read and write. During the dictatorship of Primo de Rivera he went into exile in France, from where he returned after the amnesty that followed the proclamation of the Second Spanish Republic, in April 1931. In February 1936 he was part of the CNT Regional Committee of Aragon, and together with Florentino Galván, he was in charge of organizing the farmers of Valderrobres.

The Spanish Coup of July 1936 surprised him in Zaragoza, where he was secretary of propaganda of the Regional Committee. The following day he managed to flee from the capital to Tortosa, where he formed the Carod-Ferrer Column. In September they joined the South Ebro Column of Antonio Ortiz Ramírez. He participated in the liberation of the towns of Alcañiz, Caspe, Calanda, Alcorisa and Moneva, where he saved the priest Enrique Guallar, a childhood friend, from execution. At this time he collaborated with "Nuevo Aragón", a body of the Regional Defense Council of Aragon.

In 1937 he became political commissar of the 118th Mixed Brigade — the old Carod-Ferrer column after its militarization – and, later, of the 25th Division. The end of the civil war found him in the port of Alicante. He was arrested and interned in the Albatera concentration camp, from which he escaped in May 1939 with two other companions – among them Victoriano Castán Guillén, former commander of the 118th Mixed Brigade. He managed to move to France, where he was interned until the end of 1940. There he joined Francisco Ponzán's group, collaborating with the French Resistance against the Nazi occupation of France.

In January 1941 he returned to Spain, where he acted as liaison between Manuel Amil Barciá's National Committee of the CNT and the General Secretary of the CNT Celedonio Pérez Bernardo. On 7 August 1941 (Note: Some sources give the date 11 August 1941.) he was arrested in Barcelona when he was on a liaison mission between Valencia, Madrid and Barcelona, perhaps betrayed by the infiltrator Eliseo Melis Díaz, whom he suspected of being a traitor. He was tried and sentenced to death in court martial in Madrid on 11 October 1949, but the declaration in his favor of Enrique Guallar (who had been exiled to Épila by the fascist authorities) had his sentence commuted to 25 years in prison. He was imprisoned in the prisons of Figueres, being released in 1960. He settled in Barcelona, where he was arrested again in October 1961 and 1962. In 1965 he participated in the cincopuntismo movement. In February 1976 he participated in the Sants Congress, by which the CNT was reconstituted.

== Family ==
He was the uncle of the ERC politician Josep-Lluís Carod-Rovira.

== Bibliography ==
- Alpert, Michael (2013). The Republican Army in the Spanish Civil War, 1936–1939. Cambridge University Press.
- Engel, Carlos (1999). Historia de las Brigadas Mixtas del Ejército Popular de la República (in Spanish). Madrid: Almena. ISBN 84-922644-7-0.
- García-Sanz, Ángel (2001). El exilio republicano navarro de 1939 (in Spanish). Gobierno de Navarra.
- Maldonado, José M.ª (2007). El frente de Aragón. La Guerra Civil en Aragón (1936–1938) (in Spanish). Mira Editores. ISBN 978-84-8465-237-3.
- Paz, Abel (2001). CNT 1939-1951. El Anarquismo contra el Estado franquista (in Spanish). Fundación de Estudios Libertarios «Anselmo Lorenzo».
- Téllez, Antonio (1996). La red de evasión del grupo Ponzán: anarquistas en la guerra secreta contra el franquismo y el nazismo (1936–1944) (in Spanish). La Lletra SCCL Virus.
