= Evaristo Viñuales Larroy =

Aragonese anarchist (1913–1939)

Councillor of Information & Propaganda
- In office 21 December 1936 – 10 August 1936
- President: Joaquín Ascaso
- Constituency: Aragon

Personal details
- Born: 22 June 1913 Peralta de Alcofea, Uesca, Aragon
- Died: 1 April 1939 (aged 25) Alicante, Valencia
- Citizenship: Spain
- Party: CNT-FAI
- Domestic partner: Lorenza Sarsa Hernández
- Children: Zeïka Sonia
- Parent: Evaristo Viñuales Escartín (father)
- Profession: Teaching

Military service
- Allegiance: Republican faction
- Branch/service: Spanish Republican Army
- Years of service: 1937–1939
- Rank: Captain
- Unit: 127th Mixed Brigade
- Battles/wars: Spanish Civil War

Evaristo Viñuales Larroy (22 June 1913 – 1 April 1939) was an Aragonese teacher and anarchist.

== Biography ==
Evaristo Viñuales Larroy was born into an educated family: his father and aunt, Evaristo and Gregoria Viñuales Escartín, were both teachers at the Escuela Normal of Huesca. After the early death of his father on 15 August 1928, the young Evaristo completed his exams to become a teacher, following the family tradition. His fellow students, including Francisco Ponzán Vidal and Miguel Chueca Cuartero, were all educated by the anarcho-syndicalist teacher Ramón Acín Aquilué.

In 1931, with the proclamation of the Second Spanish Republic, he joined the National Confederation of Labor (Spanish: Confederación Nacional del Trabajo, CNT). He was arrested several times for his syndicalist activities: in February 1932, in April 1933, during the general strike of November 1933, and at the end of 1934, when he was sentenced to two years in prison in Alcalá de Henares. After the 1936 Spanish general election, Viñuales Larroy was paroled and returned to work immediately. Together with his colleagues Eusebi Carbón y Carbón and Jaume Balius y Mir, he founded the weekly libertarian theory publication Más Lejos (English: Further Away). Among the magazine's contributors were Josep Peirats Valls, Federica Montseny, Amparo Poch y Gascón, Alexander Schapiro and Emma Goldman.

In December 1936, Viñuales Larroy participated in the Regional Defense Council of Aragon as information and propaganda advisor: in this position he was assisted by Félix Carrasquer Launed and together they founded the School of Libertarian Militants of Aragon. In July 1937, as secretary of the Regional Committee of Anarchist Groups of Aragon, he took part in the peninsular meeting of the Iberian Anarchist Federation. During this period, he collaborated with libertarian newspapers Cultura y Acción, Titán and Nuevo Aragón.

The destruction of collectivization, carried out systematically by the republican troops commanded by Enrique Líster, pushed Viñuales and Máximo Franco Cavero to join the 127th Mixed Brigade, formerly the Red and Black Column. Appointed captain, he fought in the column until the end of the war. When defeat was evident, with nationalist troops advancing and Republican troops in total retreat, Viñuales and Cavero decided that they would not end up at the hands of the fascists. Both committed suicide together on 1 April 1939, shooting themselves while shaking hands. "This is our last protest against fascism," Evaristo said before pulling the trigger.

Evaristo Viñuales Larroy's partner, Lorenza Sarsa Hernández, managed to cross the Pyrenees, together with their daughter, Zeïka Sonia (born 22 November 1938). The Gestapo captured them but they were released years later through the intervention of Francisco Ponzán Vidal's resistance group.
