= List of Spanish Republican divisions =

Divisions Divisiones
- Flag of the 44th Division of the People's Republican Army that has been kept at the Museum in Tabar, Navarre.
- Active: 1936–1939
- Country: Spain
- Branch: Spanish Republican Armed Forces
- Type: Division
- Role: Home Defence
- Part of: Army Corps of the Spanish Republic
- Engagements: Spanish Civil War

List of Spanish Republican divisions. The following is a list of the divisions of the Popular Army of the Spanish Republic. During the Spanish Civil War, the Republican government organized a number of mostly infantry divisions for national defense under Prime Minister Francisco Largo Caballero. These were integrated in the Army Corps (Spanish: Cuerpos del Ejército) of the Army.

The divisions were formed with an average of three mixed brigades (Spanish: Brigadas Mixtas) each. All of these divisions and the mixed brigades that integrated them were disbanded after the defeat of the Spanish Republican Armed Forces at the end of the Civil War and the annihilation of the Spanish Republican state by the Francoist regime.

== Divisions ==
- 1st Division, part of the 1st Army Corps of the Central Army in 1937.
- 2nd Division, part of the 1st Army Corps of the Central Army in 1937.
- 3rd Division, part of the 1st Army Corps of the Central Army in 1937.
- 4th Division, part of the 2nd Army Corps of the Central Army in 1937.
- 5th Division, part of the 6th Army Corps of the Central Army in 1937.
- 6th Division, part of the 2nd Army Corps of the Central Army in 1937.
- 7th Division, part of the 6th Army Corps of the Central Army in 1937.
- 8th Division, part of the 6th Army Corps of the Central Army in 1937.
- 9th Division, part of the 3rd Army Corps of the Central Army in 1937.
- 10th Division, part of the 1st Army Corps of the Central Army in 1937.
- 11th Division, nicknamed "División Líster". Part of the 5th Army Corps of the Central Army in 1937. Later part of the 22nd Army Corps.
- 12th Division, part of the 4th Army Corps of the Central Army in 1937.
- 13th Division, part of the 3rd Army Corps of the Central Army in 1937.
- 14th Division, part of the 4th Army Corps of the Central Army in 1937.
- 15th Division, part of the 3rd Army Corps of the Central Army in 1937.
- 16th Division, part of the 3rd Army Corps of the Central Army in 1937.
- 17th Division, part of the 4th Army Corps of the Central Army in 1937.
- 18th Division, part of the 2nd Army Corps of the Central Army in 1937.
- 19th Division, part of the Southern Army in 1937.
- 20th Division, part of the Southern Army in 1937. Later part of the 9th Army Corps of the Andalusian Army.
- 21st Division, part of the Southern Army in 1937. Later part of the 9th Army Corps of the Andalusian Army.
- 22nd Division, part of the Southern Army in 1937. Later part of the 9th Army Corps of the Andalusian Army.
- 23rd Division, part of the Southern Army in 1937. Later part of the 23rd Army Corps of the Andalusian Army.
- 24th Division, part of the Southern Army in 1937.
- 25th Division, part of the Eastern Army in 1937. Later part of the 22nd Army Corps.
- 26th Division, part of the Eastern Army in 1937.
- 27th Division, nicknamed "La Bruja". Part of the Eastern Army in June 1937. Later part of the 21st Army Corps of the Maneuver Army.
- 28th Division, part of the Eastern Army in June 1937. Later part of the 21st Army Corps of the Maneuver Army.
- 29th Division, former Lenin Division of the POUM. Disbanded in August 1937. Recreated and made part of the 7th Army Corps of the Extremaduran Army in February 1938.
- 30th Division, part of the Eastern Army in 1937.
- 31st Division, part of the military reserve of the Eastern Army in 1937.
- 32nd Division, part of the military reserve of the Eastern Army in 1937.
- 33rd Division, part of the military reserve of the Eastern Army in 1937.
- 34th Division, part of the 5th Army Corps of the Central Army in 1937. Later part of the 18th Army Corps
- 35th Division, also known as "35th International Division" (35.ª División Internacional). Part of the 5th Army Corps of the Central Army in 1937. Later part of the Maneuver Army (Ejército de Maniobra).
- 36th Division, part of the 7th Army Corps of the Central Army in 1937.
- 37th Division, part of the 7th Army Corps of the Central Army in 1937.
- 38th Division, part of the 7th Army Corps of the Central Army in 1937.
- 39th Division, part of the Teruel Operations Army (Ejército de Operaciones de Teruel) in 1937. Later part of the 13th Army Corps of the Levantine Army (Ejército de Levante).
- 40th Division, part of the Teruel Operations Army in 1937. Later part of the 19th Army Corps.
- 41st Division, part of the Teruel Operations Army in 1937. Later part of the 19th Army Corps.
- 42nd Division. Initially known as 'Cuenca Autonomous Group', part of the Teruel Operations Army in 1937. Later part of the 13th Army Corps of the Levantine Army.
- 43rd Division, nicknamed "La Heroica". Part of the 10th Army Corps of the Eastern Army (Ejército del Este) in December 1937. Ended up in the Pyrenees in April 1938.
- 44th Division, part of the 12th Army Corps of the Eastern Army in December 1937.
- 45th Division, also known as "45th International Division" (45.ª División Internacional). Part of the 21st Army Corps of the Maneuver Army in December 1937.
- 46th Division, part of the 5th Army Corps of the Maneuver Army in December 1937.
- 47th Division, part of the 5th Army Corps of the Maneuver Army in December 1937.
- 48th Division, part of the 1st Euzkadi Army Corps of the Northern Army —later 14th Army Corps— in 1937. Former 1st Euzkadi Division.
- 49th Division, part of the Northern Army in 1937. Former 2nd Euzkadi Division.
- 50th Division, part of the Northern Army in 1937. Former 3rd Euzkadi Division.
- 51st Division, part of the Northern Army in 1937. Former 4th Euzkadi Division.
- 52nd Division, part of the 1st Santander Army Corps of the Northern Army —later 15th Army Corps— in 1937. Former 1st Santander Division.
- 53rd Division, part of the Northern Army in 1937. Former 2nd Santander Division.
- 54th Division, part of the Northern Army in 1937. Former 3rd Santander Division.
- 55th Division, part of the Northern Army in 1937. Former 5th Euzkadi Division.
- 56th Division, part of the Northern Army in 1937. Former 7th Asturian Division.
- 57th Division, part of the Northern Army in 1937. Former Asturian Shock Division (División Asturiana de Choque).
- 58th Division, part of the Northern Army in 1937. Former 6th Asturian Division.
- 59th Division, part of 1st Asturian Army Corps of the Northern Army —later 17th Army Corps— in 1937. Former 1st Asturian Division.
- 60th Division, part of the Northern Army in 1937. Former 2nd Asturian Division.
- 61st Division, part of the Northern Army in 1937. Former 3rd Asturian Division.
- 62nd Division, part of the Northern Army in 1937. Former 4th Asturian Division.
- 63rd Division, part of the Northern Army in 1937. Former 5th Asturian Division.
- 64th Division, part of the 19th Army Corps in December 1937.
- 65th Division, part of the 2nd Army Corps of the Central Army in December 1937.
- 66th Division, part of the 20th Army Corps of the Maneuver Army in December 1937.
- 67th Division, part of the 20th Army Corps of the Maneuver Army in December 1937.
- 68th Division, part of the 20th Army Corps of the Maneuver Army in December 1937.
- 69th Division, part of the First Army Corps of the Central Army in December 1937.
- 70th Division, part of the 18th Army Corps of the Maneuver Army in December 1937.
- 71st Division, part of the 23rd Army Corps of the Andalusian Army in December 1937.
- 72nd Division, part of the 18th Army Corps of the Maneuver Army in December 1937.
- 77th Division, part of the 24th Army Corps of the Eastern Region Army Group (GERO) in December 1938. It was the last Spanish Republican division to be established.
- Armoured Vehicles Division, Spanish: División de Ingenios Blindados (DBI)
- C Division, gave origin to the 11th Division
- Euzkadi Liaison Division (División de Enlace de Euzkadi)
- M Division, part of the 12th Army Corps of the Eastern Army in April 1938.
- 48th Guerrilla Division, part of the XIV Guerrilla Army Corps of the Maneuver Army.
- 49th Guerrilla Division, part of the XIV Guerrilla Army Corps of the Maneuver Army.
- 50th Guerrilla Division, part of the XIV Guerrilla Army Corps of the Maneuver Army.

== See also ==
- Territorial Organization of the Spanish Army in 1936 (Organización territorial del Ejército de España en 1936)

== Bibliography ==
- Michael Alpert (1989); El Ejército Republicano en la Guerra Civil, Siglo XXI de España, Madrid.ISBN 978-84-323-0682-2
- Carlos Engel Masoliver (1999); Historia de las Brigadas mixtas del Ejército popular de la República, 1936-1939, Editorial Almena, Madrid, 1999 ISBN 84-96170-19-5.
- Helen Graham (2003). The Spanish Republic at War, 1936–1939. Cambridge University Press. ISBN 978-0521459327.
- Ramón Salas Larrazábal (2006); Historia del Ejército Popular de la República. La Esfera de los Libros S.L. ISBN 84-9734-465-0
- Hugh Thomas (1976); Historia de la Guerra Civil Española. Círculo de Lectores, Barcelona.ISBN 84-226-0874-X.
