= Brigade of Death =

Unit of the confederal militias

- Brigada de la Mort
- Active: July 1936–October 1936
- Allegiance: FAI
- Branch: Confederal militias
- Size: Brigade
- Part of: South Ebro Column
- Garrison/HQ: Caspe
- Engagements: Spanish Civil War

Commanders
- Notable commanders: Pascual Fresquet

The Brigade of Death was a unit of the confederal militias that acted at the beginning of the Spanish Civil War in the republican rear (Tarragona and Bajo Aragón). Officially it was the investigation brigade of the South Ebro Column, a column of anarchist militiamen that Antonio Ortiz had led from Barcelona. Its leader was Pascual Fresquet and it was made up of some forty militiamen linked to the Barcelona Federación Anarquista Ibérica (FAI).

== History ==
Between July and September 1936, it acted in sixteen municipalities of the province of Tarragona (in the regions of Priorat, Terra Alta, Ribera d'Ebre and Baix Camp), in a municipality of the province of Barcelona (the region of Osona) and in various municipalities of Lower Aragon: Caspe, Fabara, Maella, Gandesa, Falset, Mequinenza, Albalate del Arzobispo, Torelló, Calanda, Samper de Calanda, Híjar, Bot, Flix, Ascó, Riba-roja d'Ebre, Móra d'Ebre and Reus. Its goal was to implement libertarian communism from town to town, traveling in a black bus with painted skulls. They persecuted and executed alleged fascists, Carlists, Catholics or peasants who opposed collectivizations, 247 people were documented to have been murdered by the brigade.

The brutality with which the Death Brigade operated caused the representative of the Catalan CNT to declare in the plenary session of the CNT regionals on 16 September 1936, in Madrid, before the complaints of the Aragonese representative:

Catalonia clarifies that in Barcelona there is an agreement to dismiss Ortiz and at the same time to hold a meeting between the Regional Committees of Aragon and Catalonia; It adds that a commission was appointed in Barcelona to find out the misdeeds committed by the Death Brigade, led by Ortiz, and that this Commission will report at said meeting.

The commission called its leader, Pascual Fresquet, to order, and he had to account for his actions. The Brigade, considered by the leadership of the CNT as contrary to the "revolutionary spirit", ceased to operate as of October 1936.

In 2008, the Catalan journalist Toni Orensanz published a book, L'òmnibus de la mort: parada Falset (The death bus: Falset stop) about the column and the 27 murders they committed in one night in the journalist's hometown of Falset.

== See also ==
- Anarchism in Spain

== Bibliography ==
- Solé i Sabaté, Josep Maria; Villarroya, Joan. La repressió a la rereguarda de Catalunya (1936 - 1939) (in Catalan). Barcelona: Publicacions de l'Abadia de Montserrat.
- Ledesma, José Luis (2003). Los días de llamas de la revolución (in Spanish). Zaragoza: Diputación de Zaragoza.
- Orensanz, Toni. "La Brigada de la Muerte" (in Spanish). No. 70. Barcelona: Sàpiens. p. 32.
- Orensanz, Toni (2008). L'òmnibus de la mort: parada Falset (in Catalan). Barcelona: Ara Llibres.
