= Ortiz Column =

Anarchist militia column during the Spanish Civil War

- Columna de Ortiz
- Active: 24 July 1936–May 1937
- Country: Spain
- Allegiance: Confederación Nacional del Trabajo
- Branch: Confederal militias
- Type: Militia column
- Size: 4,500 (August 1936)
- Garrison/HQ: Zaila, Teruel
- Colours: Red; Black
- Engagements: Spanish Civil War: Aragon front

Commanders
- Commander: Antoni Ortiz
- Military advisor: Fernando Salavera

The Ortiz Column (Spanish: Columna Ortiz), later known as the South Ebro Column (Spanish: Columna Sur-Ebro), was a column of the confederal militias that fought in the Spanish Civil War. It was the second militia column established by anarchists in Catalonia that was sent to fight on the Aragon front. Led by Antoni Ortiz, the column quickly captured Casp and Quinto on the south bank of the Ebro river. They then besieged Belchit, but were unable to capture the town from the Nationalists. The front lines held by the column remained largely stagnant, until the outbreak of the Battle of Belchit in 1937. During this time, the column published its own newspaper and magazine, and participated in the establishment of the Regional Defence Council of Aragon. In early 1937, the column was militarised into the 25th Division of the Popular Army of the Republic. Ortiz came into conflict with his superior command and was later transferred to the 24th Division.

== Formation ==
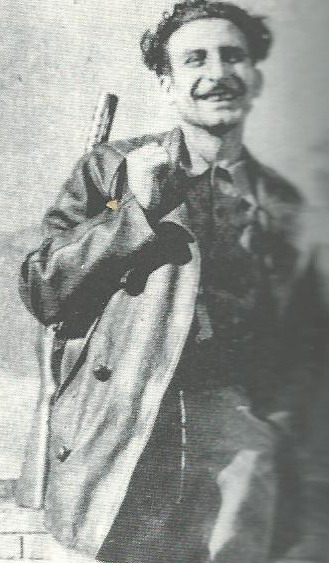
Antoni Ortiz, commander of the self-titled Ortiz Column

Following the defeat of the July 1936 military uprising in Barcelona by anarchist militias, the Central Committee of Anti-fascist Militias of Catalonia (CCMA) was established, with the aim of organising militia columns to send to fight the Nationalist forces in Aragon. A war committee was established by the anarchists Buenaventura Durruti, Antoni Ortiz and Cristóbal Aldabaldetrecu, together with representatives of the Unión General de Trabajadores (UGT) and the Workers' Party of Marxist Unification (POUM), and a number of military advisors. On 24 July, the first militia to leave Barcelona for Aragon was the Durruti Column, with the Ortiz Column (Spanish: Columna de Ortiz) (Note: It was also known as the Black and Red Column (Spanish: Columna Negra y Roja), and later changed its name to the South Ebro Column (Spanish: Columna Sur-Ebro).) departing by train soon after. Their respective commanders, Buenaventura Durruti and Antoni Ortiz, were among an experienced cadre of activists from the Nostros group of the Iberian Anarchist Federation (FAI). Major Fernando Salavera was appointed as the Ortiz Column's military advisor. The Column was formed by members of the Confederación Nacional del Trabajo (CNT), the Republican Left of Catalonia (ERC) and Estat Català (EC), as well as soldiers of the Alcántara Infantry Regiment. Among the founding members was Concha Pérez, an anarchist who had taken part in the capture of the Pedralbes barracks, the Hospital Clínic and the Sisters of Loreto convent during the uprising.

At the time of its foundation, the Column counted between 2,000 and 3,500 militiamen. It also had three artillery batteries, 50 machine guns and a number of mortar cannons. The Ortiz Column also had its own international group, which initially brought together 10 French people and grew to count dozens of international volunteers. At the beginning of the war, German anarchist Werner Droescher was attached to the Ortiz Column as part of a POUM militia. Anarchists in New York also responded to an appeal from the CNT, with the Italian-American pilot Armando Vecchietti going to Spain before he had finished flight training and joining the Ortiz Column. The Sébastien Faure centuria, a company made up of Belgian, French and Italian anarchists, was also occasionally joined to the Ortiz Column.

== Aragon front ==
The CCMA directed the Ortiz Column to capture the south bank of the Ebro river. On 25 July, they arrived at Casp, which they swiftly captured after briefly bombarding it with artillery. At 13:00, the Catalan government announced the city's capture over the radio, reporting that the Ortiz Column had been welcomed as liberators by the inhabitants. The Ortiz Column then took control of the south bank of the Ebro and placed Belchit under siege.

While under attack from Nationalist forces from Zaragoza, the Ortiz Column attempted to capture Belchit and Quinto. They waded across the Ebro and captured Quinto, taking the cavalry regiment which had occupied it as prisoners and extracting information about the Nationalist forces in Zaragoza from them. CNT militants from Zaragoza escaped the city to the zone occupied by the Ortiz Column and joined the militia. It was also joined by the Hilario-Zamora Column, which counted 1,000 militiamen from Lleida, and 600 soldiers from Tarragona, led by colonel Ángel Martínez Peñalver. By the time it was joined by the Macià-Companys Column, established by the Catalan nationalists, the Ortiz Column counted 4,500 militiamen.

The Ortiz Column repeatedly attempted to capture Belchit, but the Nationalists fortified their positions there and were reinforced by the garrisons in Zaragoza and Calatayud. The column then settled in Zaila, where they were joined by the English writer Greville Texidor and the militiawoman Carmen Crespo. By September 1936, their advance had been halted, as they lacked weapons and ammunition. They would remain in Zaila until the Battle of Belchit in August 1937. There the Ortiz Column began publishing a newspaper which was noted for the quality of its typography and a relative lack of typographical errors. They also published the magazine Cultura y Acción.

On 6 October 1936, the Ortiz Column participated in the establishment of the Regional Defence Council of Aragon, represented at the founding assembly by the Aragonese CNT leader Joaquín Ascaso. Ortiz himself worried that the creation of the council might impede the war effort against the Nationalists. He therefore helped to ensure that control of military operations would remain with the Catalan government. To coordinate front line operations, the Defence Council instead oversaw the establishment of a War Committee, which included a delegate from the Ortiz Column. On 8 October, Ortiz and Durruti attended a military conference in Sarinyena, where they clashed with José del Barrio and colonel José Villalba of the Unified Socialist Party of Catalonia (PSUC). Ortiz affirmed that his column would obey orders from the War Committee and do everything that was required of them.

== Militarisation ==
In February 1937, at a plenum of the confederal militias, a delegate for the Ortiz Column reported that their progress had stalled because they had stopped when they met first resistance at Belchit. He disputed that their advance had stagnated due to a lack of military discipline. The Ortiz Column delegate called for the militias to purchase weapons for themselves, rather than waiting for the Soviet Union to supply them, and build up their strength on all fronts against both the Nationalists and their own Republican allies. Later in the plenum, the Ortiz Column protested against the proposed militarisation of the militia columns, believing it would negate their strength at the front.

Nevertheless, the Ortiz Column was ultimately militarised into the 25th Division of the Popular Army of the Republic. It was nicknamed the Jubert Division, after Luis Jubert Salieti, a captain in the Ortiz Column who was killed in action on the Aragon front. The new military unit published 25th Division, a self-titled newspaper, which they initially published on a weekly basis from a small printing press in a truck before acquiring a press in Barcelona, from which they published it on a daily basis. The 25th Division was divided into the 116th, 117th Mixed Brigade and 118th Mixed Brigades, which were each separated into different corps in order to effectively dissolve the remains of the anarchist Ortiz Column. Concha Pérez left the Column after half a year of service and returned to Barcelona, where she was later wounded during the May Days.

Following the outbreak of the May Days, multiple companies of the former Ortiz Column left the front and headed towards Barcelona to fight the communists. One battalion headed towards Tortosa, while Ortiz coordinated with Joaquín Ascaso and Saturnino Carod to prepare resistance in the province of Teruel. However, their forces were halted at Lleida and ordered to return to the front lines. After the suppression of the May Days, Ortiz was among the anarchists who came to believe that collaboration with the government had been a mistake. In August 1937, Antoni Ortiz was stripped of his command of the 25th Division and replaced with Miguel García Vivancos, after he was reported to have been uncooperative during the Battle of Belchit. Ortiz later took command of the 24th Division, which was stretched to occupy a 150 kilometre-long front line despite half its soldiers being unarmed.

== Bibliography ==
- Alba, Victor; Schwartz, Stephen (1988). "Defamation". Spanish Marxism versus Soviet Communism: A History of the P.O.U.M. Transaction Publishers. pp. 171–209. doi:10.4324/9781315130118-7. ISBN 0-88738-198-7.
- Alexander, Robert J. (1999). The Anarchists in the Spanish Civil War. Janus Publishing Company. ISBN 978-1-85756-400-6.
- Alpert, Michael (2013). The Republican Army in the Spanish Civil War, 1936–1939. Cambridge University Press. ISBN 978-1-107-02873-9.
- Brodie, Morris (2020a). "Volunteers for Anarchy: The International Group of the Durruti Column in the Spanish Civil War". Journal of Contemporary History. 56 (1): 28–54. doi:10.1177/0022009420949926.
- Brodie, Morris (2020b). Transatlantic Anarchism during the Spanish Civil War and Revolution, 1936-1939: Fury Over Spain. Routledge. doi:10.4324/9780429328763. ISBN 978-0-367-34930-1.
- Casanova, Julián (2005). Preston, Paul (ed.). Anarchism, the Republic and Civil War in Spain: 1931–1939. Translated by Dowling, Andrew; Pollok, Graham. Routledge. ISBN 0-415-32095-X.
- Cuadrada, Coral (2016). "The Revolution of the Women Without Anything, Without a Name". Časopis za povijest Zapadne Hrvatske. 11: 25–48. ISSN 1846-3223.
- Evans, Danny (2018). Revolution and the State: Anarchism in the Spanish Civil War, 1936–1939. Routledge. ISBN 978-1-138-06314-3.
- Lines, Lisa (2013). "Female Combatants in the Spanish Civil War: Milicianas on the Front Lines and in the Rearguard". Journal of International Women's Studies. 10 (4).
- Mugnai, Bruno (2019). Foreign volunteers and International Brigades in the Spanish civil war (1936-39). Soldiershop. ISBN 9788893274524.
- Pagès i Blanch, Pelai (2013) [2007]. War and Revolution in Catalonia, 1936–1939. Translated by Gallagher, Patrick. Brill. ISBN 978-90-04-25426-8.
- Paz, Abel (2006) [1996]. Durruti in the Spanish Revolution. Translated by Morse, Chuck. Edinburgh: AK Press. ISBN 1-904859-50-X. LCCN 2006920974. OCLC 482919277.
- Paz, Abel (2011). The Story of the Iron Column: Militant Anarchism in the Spanish Civil War. AK Press. ISBN 978-1-84935-064-8.
- Serrano Rubiera, Joaquín (2021). "British fighters in the Spanish Civil War, 1936-1939". In Tauler Cid, Benito (ed.). The British Presence in the Spanish Military. pp. 197–264. ISBN 978-84-9091-575-2.
