= 153rd Mixed Brigade =

- Active: June 1937 – January 1939
- Country: Spanish Republic
- Allegiance: Republican faction
- Branch: Spanish Republican Army
- Type: Infantry
- Size: Brigade
- Engagements: Spanish Civil War: Battle of Belchite; Aragon Offensive; Battle of Segre

The 153rd Mixed Brigade was a unit of the Spanish Civil War that took part in the Spanish Civil War. Formed around the old Land and Freedom Column, the unit took part in the battles of Belchite, Aragon and Segre.

== History ==
The unit was created in June 1937, in the Aragon front, from the militarization of the Land and Freedom Column. It was also joined by elements of various origins, such as the "Battalion of Death" or former POUMists of the 29th Division. Antonio Seba Amorós (the real last name was Morro) was appointed to the head of the unit, while the anarchist Francisco Señer Martín was appointed political commissioner. During the first months it went through a training period. Later, the 153rd Mixed Brigade was integrated into the 24th Division of the 12th Army Corps.

The unit took part in the Battle of Belchite. Stationed in the rear, in Caspe, the 153rd MB was called to intervene in the new Zaragoza Offensive. After having some difficulties, on 28 August it managed to penetrate Belchite by the Mediana road. As of 5 September, the unit, together with the 32nd Mixed Brigade, was in charge of the siege of Belchite. The last resistance photos continued until the next day, when they gave up. For the next several months it remained inactive.

At the beginning of March 1938, the unit was deployed in the sector of Fuendetodos-Azuara-Herrera, with a force of 2,970 people. The 153rd Mixed Brigade was located in the axis of the enemy attack, having to resist the bulk of the enemy offensive. As a result, the brigade was destroyed and had to withdraw; the command of the unit, Seba, was filed and dismissed. The remains of the brigade were totally dispersed to the North of the Ebro, being briefly integrated into the Autonomous Group of the Ebro. On 19 April, the 153rd MB was deployed in Valdomá, becoming part of the 30th Division of the 11th Army Corps. Command of the unit passed to Antonio Núñez Balsera, with Emilio Callizo Val as Chief of Staff.

On 13 August, it participated in the offensive on the Vilanova de la Barca bridgehead, relieving the 3rd Mixed Brigade; four days later the 153rd MB crossed the Segre River, after suffering heavy losses. One of the battalions of the unit took part in the Battle of the Ebro.

During the Catalonia Offensive, the unit intervened in some actions, although it played a minor role.

== Command ==
Commanders

- Antonio Seba Amorós;
- Antonio Núñez Balsera

Commissars

- Francisco Sener Martín

== See also ==
- Mixed Brigades
- Land and Freedom Column

== Bibliography ==
- Álvarez, Santiago (1989). Los comisarios políticos en el Ejército Popular de la República (in Spanish). Ediciós do Castro.
- Engel, Carlos (1999). Historia de las Brigadas Mixtas del Ejército Popular de la República (in Spanish). Madrid: Almena. ISBN 84-922644-7-0.
- Flores, Pedro (1981). Las luchas sociales en el Alto Llobregat y Cardoner (in Spanish). Ed. Pedro Flores.
- Hernández Sánchez, Fernando (2010). Guerra o revolución: el Partido Comunista de España en la Guerra Civil (in Spanish). Barcelona: Crítica.
- Michonneau, Stéphane (2017). Fue ayer: Belchite. Un pueblo frente a la cuestión del pasado (in Spanish). Prensas de la Universidad de Zaragoza.
- Maldonado, José María (2007). El frente de Aragón. La Guerra Civil en Aragón (1936–1938) (in Spanish). Mira Ediciones. ISBN 978-84-8465-237-3.
- Téllez, Antonio (1996). La red de evasión del grupo Ponzán: anarquistas en la guerra secreta contra el franquismo y el nazismo (1936-1944) (in Spanish). La Lletra SCCL Virus.
