= Ebro Army =

The Ebro Army (Spanish: Ejército del Ebro) was a Spanish Republican army during the Spanish Civil War.

== History ==
The army was formed in April 1938 as the Autonomous Group of the Ebro (Spanish : Agrupación Autónoma del Ebro), but was renamed Ebro Army on 23 May 1938. It was established on the basis of the V Army Corps, was reinforced with the newly created XV Army Corps and became an elite unit of the Republican troops.

The army fought in the Battle of the Ebro. Fortified in mountainous terrain, it withstood seven offensives by Nationalist troops. Ultimately, it was forced to withdraw towards France. Between 5 and 10 February 1939, soldiers of the Ebro Army crossed the Spanish-French border and were interned in camps in France.

== Order of Battle ==
25 July 1938

Army Corps	Divisions	Commander
V Army Corps	35th, 3rd & 42nd	Manuel Tagüeña
XV Army Corps	11th, 46th & 45th	Enrique Líster
XII Army Corps	16th, 44th & 56th	Etelvino Vega

== Leaders ==
Commander

- Militia Colonel Juan Modesto;

Comisar

- Luis Delage García, PCE;

Chief of Staff

- Colonel of engineers José Sánchez Rodríguez;

== Sources ==
- Alonso Baquer, Miguel (2004). La Esfera de los Libros (ed.). El Ebro, la batalla decisiva de los cien días.
- Alpert, Michael (2013). Cambridge University Press (ed.). The Republican Army in the Spanish Civil War, 1936-1939.
- Álvarez, Santiago (1989). Ediciós do Castro (ed.). Los comisarios políticos en el Ejército Popular de la República.
- Bron, Michał (1976). Warsaw (ed.). Bitwa nad Ebro i udział w niej Polaków.
- Engel, Carlos (1999). Almena (ed.). Historia de las Brigadas Mixtas del Ejército Popular de la República. 84-922644-7-0.
- Martínez Bande, José Manuel (1977). Editorial San Martín (ed.). La ofensiva sobre Valencia.
- Suero Roca, M.ª Teresa (1981). Ed. Península Ibérica (ed.). Militares republicanos de la Guerra de España. 84-297-1706-4.
- Salas Larrazábal, Ramón (2006). La Esfera de los Libros (ed.). Historia del Ejército Popular de la República. 84-9734-465-0.
- Romero Salvado, Francisco (2009). Palgrave Macmillan (ed.). The Spanish Civil War: Origins, Course and Outcomes.
