= List of Aragonese =

Aragon within Spain

This is a list of famous Aragonese people. It includes people from the medieval Kingdom of Aragon or from contemporary Aragon, one of the Autonomous Communities of Spain.

== Artists ==
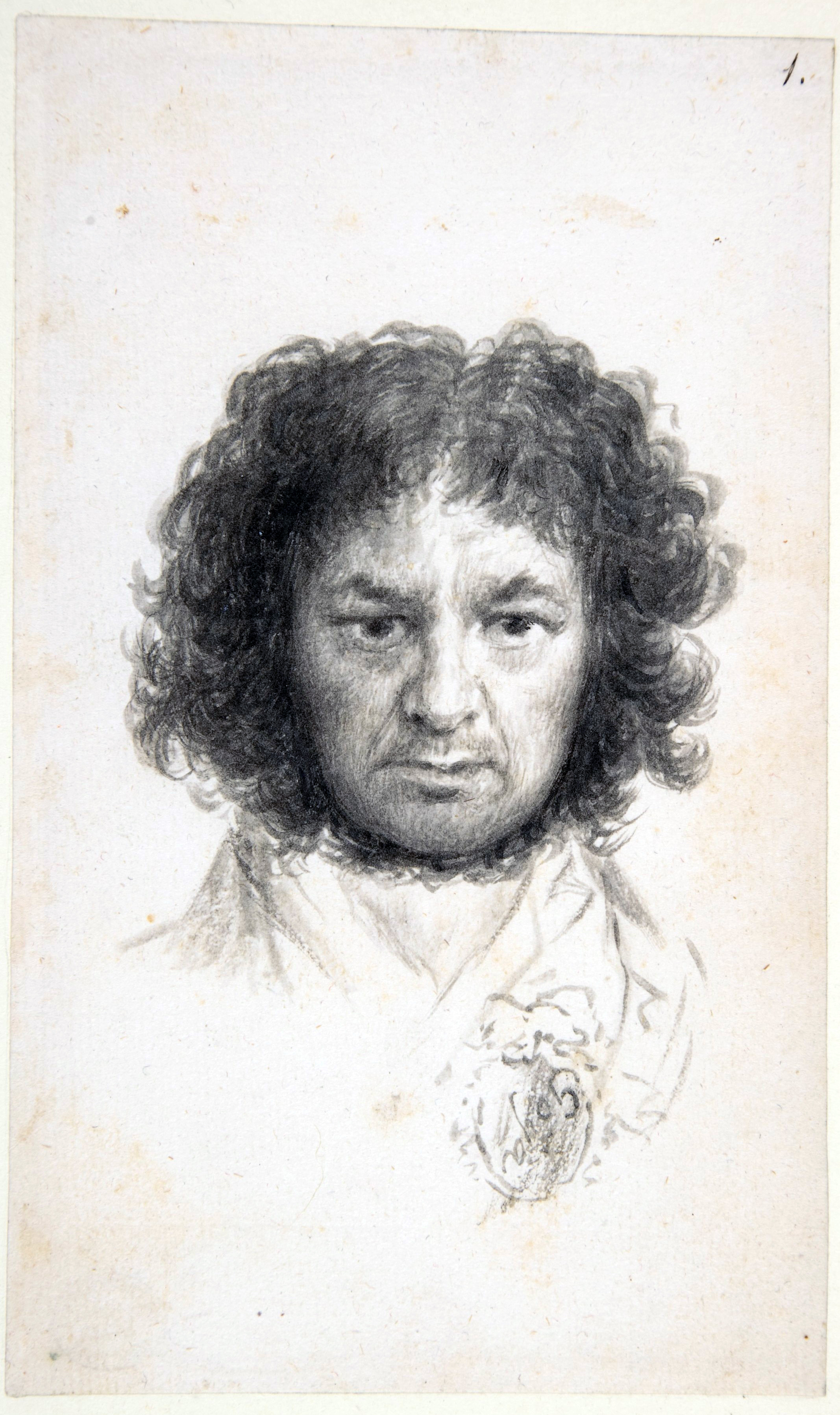
Goya, self-portrait

- Francisco Goya (1746–1828), painter and printmaker
- Antonio Saura (1930–1998), painter
- Carlos Ezquerra (1947–2018), comic artist and creator of Judge Dredd

== Filmmakers ==
- Segundo de Chomón (1871–1929), one of the first directors and SFX experts in film history
- Florián Rey (1894–1962), filmmaker
- Luis Buñuel (1900–1983), filmmaker
- Carlos Saura (1932–2023), filmmaker

== Kings ==
Most notable kings of Aragon, not necessarily born there.

- Alfonso the Battler (1073/4–1134), king of Aragon and Navarre
- James I of Aragon (1208–1276), king of Aragon, he expanded the Crown of Aragon into Valencia, Languedoc and the Balearic Islands.
- Peter III the Great (1239–1285), king of Aragon, conquered Sicily and Malta
- Ferdinand II of Aragon (1452–1516), king of Aragon, married Isabella of Castile and conquered the Kingdom of Navarre

== Musicians ==
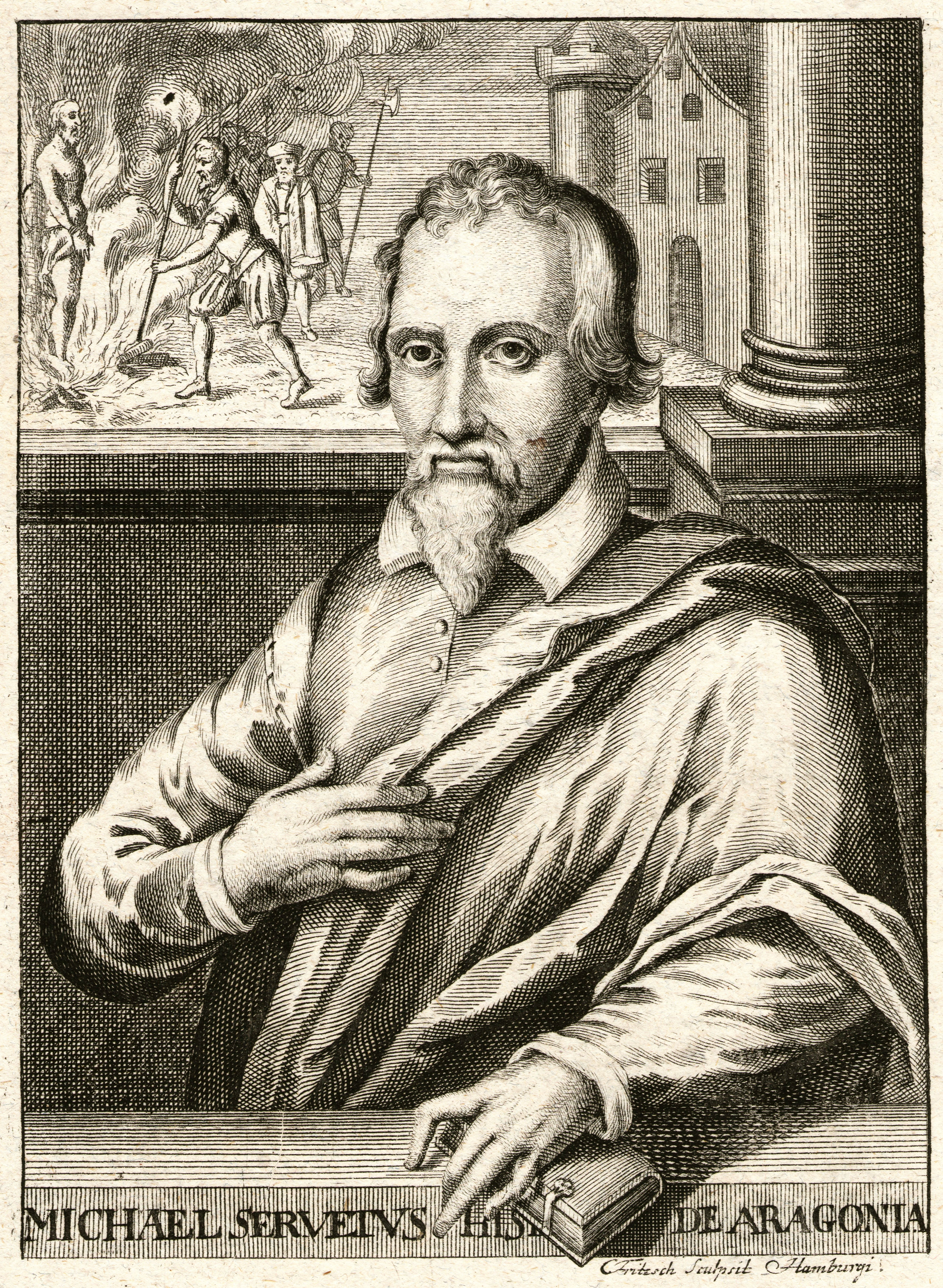
Michael Servetus

- Miguel Fleta (1897–1938), tenor
- Pilar Lorengar (1929–1996), soprano
- José Antonio Labordeta (1935–2010), singer-songwriter and political figure
- Enrique Bunbury (born 1967), rock singer-songwriter
- Eva Amaral (born 1973), pop singer-songwriter
- David Civera (born 1979), singer
- Santiago Auserón (born 1954), ex-singer of Radio Futura, one of the most popular pop bands in Spain during the 1980s and early 1990s

== Politicians and political activists ==
- Joaquin Costa (1846–1911), politician and thinker of the Generation of '98
- Francisco Ascaso (1901–1936), anarcho-syndicalist
- Joaquín Ascaso Budría (1906–1977), President of the Regional Defence Council of Aragon
- Joaquín Maurín (1896–1973), communist revolutionary
- Josep Antoni Duran i Lleida (born 1952), Catalan politician born in Aragón
- Juan Alberto Belloch (born 1950), Spanish interior minister and mayor of Zaragoza
- Antonio Perez (1539–1611), secretary of king Philip II of Spain
- Pedro Pablo Abarca de Bolea, Count of Aranda (1718–1798), Spanish statesman and diplomat with Kings Charles III and Charles IV
- Gaspar Torrente (1888–1970), founder of the Aragonese political movement for regional autonomy
- José Antonio Labordeta (1935–2010), singer-songwriter and representative of the Aragonese party Chunta Aragonesista in the Spanish congress

== Scientists ==
- Michael Servetus (1511–1553), physician, theologist and humanist
- Martín Sessé y Lacasta (1751–1808), botanist
- Santiago Ramón y Cajal (1852–1934), histologist and physician, Nobel laureate
- Fidel Pagés (1886–1923), surgeon, discoverer of epidural anesthesia
- Miguel A. Catalán (1894–1957), spectroscopist

== Sociologists ==
- Domingo Tirado Benedí (1898–1971), educator

== Athletes ==
- Víctor Muñoz (born 1957), football coach and former player
- Víctor Fernández (born 1960), football coach
- Alberto Belsúe (born 1968), football player

== Writers ==
- Ramón José Sender (1901–1982)
- Baltasar Gracián (1601–1658), writer and thinker with a deep impact on Schopenhauer
- Jesús Moncada (1941–2005), Aragonese writer in Catalan language
- Miguel Labordeta (1921–1969), Aragonese poet
- Javier Sierra (born 1971), Aragonese bestseller writer and researcher

== Other notables ==
- Federico Jiménez Losantos (born 1951), radio talk show host
