= 116th Mixed Brigade =

- 116.ª Brigada Mixta
- Active: April 1937 - March 1939
- Country: Spanish Republic
- Allegiance: Republican faction
- Branch: Spanish Republican Army
- Type: Infantry
- Size: Brigade
- Part of: 25th Division
- Engagements: Spanish Civil War

The 116th Mixed Brigade was a unit of the Spanish Republican Army, integrated into the 25th Division, that participated in the Spanish Civil War.

== History ==
In March 1937, the 116th Mixed Brigade was created in Cieza, although it had a short existence. (Note: It was dissolved to cede its troops to the 109th, 110th, 111th, 112th, 113th, 114th and 115th mixed brigades, also newly created.) On April 28, 1937, the 116th Mixed Brigade was reformed on the Aragon front as a unit of the 25th Division of the 12th Army Corps. It was made up of anarchist militiamen of the CNT-FAI from the former 1st Regiment of the South Ebro Column, whose militarization resulted in the 25th Division. In June 1937 the brigade participated in the Huesca Offensive, succeeding in occupying some enemy positions —although the general offensive failed.

At the end of August 1937, in the face of the Zaragoza Offensive, it became part of the “D” Group commanded by Juan Modesto. On August 24, the unit was located in the area of Quinto to participate in the siege of Codo. In the assault on this town, the 116th MB fought alongside the 32nd Mixed Brigade in a confrontation with Carlist troops. A few days later, on August 28, it took the position of La Novia del Viento, a key point for the Battle of Belchite.

In December 1937, the 116th MB was sent south along with the rest of the division to participate in a new Battle of Teruel. By December 18, it was fighting in the Old Cemetery and in the Hermitage of Santa Bárbara. The next day it advanced until it was one kilometer from Teruel's urban area. (Note: In its attack on the urban area, the 116th MB came to count on the support of battle tanks.) On December 21 it finally managed to occupy the Old Cemetery, although nationalist resistance would continue for two more days in the positions of the Hermitage of Santa Bárbara and «El Mansueto ». On January 1, 1938, together with the rest of the 25th Division, he managed to reestablish the republican lines after a nationalist counteroffensive.

On March 10, after the beginning of the Aragon Offensive, he had to move hastily to the Alcorisa sector and later to Andorra, a town that would fall to the nationalist units. Later it fought on the Levante front. (Note: During the Levante Offensive the brigade was briefly attached to the Extremadura Division.) By April 28, the brigade was located in the area of Ejulve-Villarluengo, although later (May 12) it had to move back towards Albocàsser. By July 21, it was on the XYZ Line.

The 116th MB remained inactive on the Levant front until the end of the war, in March 1939.

== Command ==
Commanders

- Jesús Boada Bayardi;
- Ramón Dalmau Juliá

Commissars

- Luis Díez Pérez de Ayala;
- Francisco Meroño Martínez;
- Benito Álvarez

== See also ==
- Mixed Brigades
- South Ebro Column

== Bibliography ==
- Casas de la Vega, Rafael (1973). Teruel (in Spanish). Barcelona: L. de Caralt.
- Engel, Carlos (1999). Historia de las Brigadas Mixtas del Ejército Popular de la República (in Spanish). Madrid: Almena. ISBN 84-922644-7-0.
- Martínez Bande, José Manuel (1973). La Gran ofensiva sobre Zaragoza (in Spanish). Madrid: Editorial San Martín.
- Martínez Bande, José Manuel (1975). La llegada al mar (in Spanish). Madrid: Editorial San Martín.
- Martínez de Baños, Fernando; Pérez, Pedro (2008). Vestigios de la Guerra Civil en Aragón (in Spanish). Zaragoza: Gobierno de Aragón.
- Zaragoza, Cristóbal (1983). Ejército Popular y Militares de la República, 1936-1939 (in Spanish). Barcelona: Ed. Planeta.
