= Carod =

Carod is a surname. Notable people with the surname include:

- Saturnino Carod, Spanish anarchist politician and guerrilla
- Titouan Carod (born 1994), French cyclist
