= Luis Montoliu Salado =

Spanish trade unionist

Councillor of Transport & Communications
- In office 21 December 1936 – 10 August 1937
- President: Joaquín Ascaso
- Constituency: Aragon

Minister of Information
- In office February 1947 – August 1947
- Prime Minister: Rodolfo Llopis
- Constituency: Spanish Republic in exile

Personal details
- Born: Madrid, Spain
- Died: 13 February 1962 Caracas, Venezuela
- Cause of death: Heart attack
- Citizenship: Spain
- Party: CNT-FAI

Luis Montoliu Salado (d. Caracas, 13 February 1962) was a Spanish anarcho-syndicalist politician.

== Biography ==
A militant of the National Confederation of Labor (Spanish: Confederación Nacional del Trabajo, CNT), in 1930 he became a member of the National Committee of the National Federation of the Railway Industry (FNIF). From 1934 to 1935, he was a member of the National Committee of the CNT and a delegate of the FNIF to the Congress of Madrid in 1935.

The outbreak of the Spanish Civil War caught him in Valencia, where he befriended Enric Marco Nadal and joined the Regional Defence Council of Aragon as head of transport and communications. He represented the CNT in the Committee of Line Operations, and he represented Aragon and Navarre in the National Defence Council.

At the end of the civil war he was taken prisoner in Alicante and sent to Aranjuez, where on 13 November 1940 he was sentenced to death in a very brief council of war. However, he was not executed and was finally released on 14 March 1946 under pardon. Based in Madrid, in 1947 he agreed to represent the CNT in the governments of the Spanish Republican government in exile, so he escaped to France and from there to Mexico, where he arrived on 17 March 1947. There he was appointed Minister of Information in the second government of Rodolfo Llopis.

He was part of the CNT sector in favor of collaborating with the republican authorities in exile. He later emigrated to Venezuela, where in 1960 he participated in the CNT Reunification Congress. On 13 February 1962 he died of a heart attack.

== Bibliography ==
- Téllez, Antonio (1996). La red de evasión del grupo Ponzán (in Spanish). La Lletra SCCL Virus. ISBN 8488455291.
- Combat syndicaliste (in French). Confédération Nationale du Travail. 8 March 1962.
