= Pascual Fresquet Llopis =

Spanish military figure

Pascual Fresquet
- Pascual Fresquet Llopis
- Born: 6 January 1907; Alcalà de Xivert, Baix Maestrat, Castellón, Valencia, Spain
- Died: 14 August 1957 (aged 50); Aubanha, Bouches-du-Rhône, Provence-Alpes-Côte d'Azur, France
- Military career
- Allegiance: CNT-FAI
- Service: Confederal militias
- Service years: 1936
- Unit: South Ebro Column
- Commands: Brigade of Death
- Conflicts: Spanish Civil War

Pascual Fresquet Llopis (Alcalà de Xivert, 6 January 1907 – 14 August 1957) was a Valencian libertarian communist and the leader of the Death Brigade.

== Biography ==
Pascual Fresquet Llopis was born in 1907 in Alcalà de Xivert. As a child his family emigrated to La Torrassa, in L'Hospitalet de Llobregat district, which was made up of a working population that was mostly affiliated with the CNT. His parents worked on the Barcelona Metro and his mother, Purificación Llopis, ran an inn on Carrer Sugranyes. Fresquet was the president of the CNT construction union in the Sants neighborhood in 1936.

With the outbreak of the war, he came to command the Brigade of Death, a unit linked to the FAI that was responsible for more than 200 murders between July and September 1936.

== Bibliography ==
- Orensanz, Toni. "La Brigada de la Muerte" (in Spanish). No. 70. Barcelona: Sàpiens. p. 32.
- Orensanz, Toni (2008). L'òmnibus de la mort: parada Falset (in Catalan). Barcelona: Ara Llibres.
