= Andreu Mayayo i Artal =

Spanish professor

Andreu Mayayo
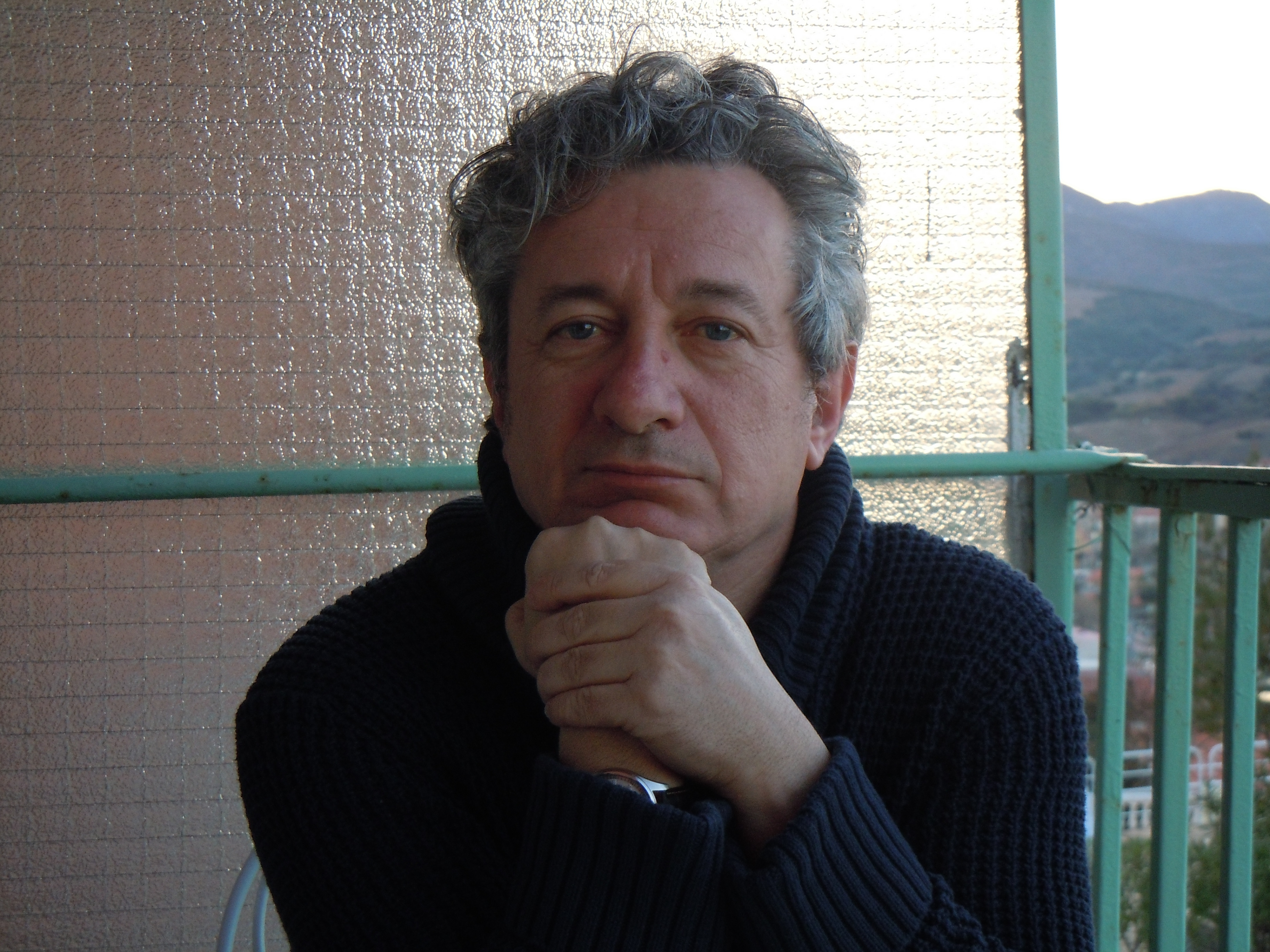
- Andreu Mayayo
- Born: 1959 (age 66–67); Samper de Calanda, Aragon, Spain
- Occupations: Professor, writer, politician
- Writing career
- Language: Catalan
- Genre: Contemporary historiography
- Subject: Research fields: Social movements / Spanish transition to democracy

Andreu Mayayo i Artal (Samper de Calanda, Aragon, 1959) is a professor of Modern History and vice-dean of the Faculty of Geography and History at the University of Barcelona. He is the editor-in-chief of the Segle XX. Revista Catalana d'Història journal, member of the editorial boards of the Catalan journals L'Avenç, Sàpiens and El Contemporani. He is also a member of the Board of the Democratic Memorial of the Government of Catalonia and a regular contributor to media debates at RAC 1, Debat de La 1 of Televisión Española, RNE Ràdio 4, Catalunya Ràdio and Barcelona TV.

As a historian, his research has been directed towards the local history, rural areas, social movements and the Spanish transition to democracy.

Politically, he has held several posts within the parties Unified Socialist Party of Catalonia and Initiative for Catalonia Greens. He has been the mayor of Montblanc, Tarragona twice, between 1991–1993 and 1995–1999. In 1998 he was charged with perversion of justice.

== Main works ==
- La Conca de Barberà 1890–1939: de la crisi agrària a la guerra civil (Centre d'Estudis de la Conca de Barberà, 1986)
- De pagesos a ciutadans. Cent anys de sindicalisme i cooperativisme agraris a Catalunya (1893–1994) (Afers, 1995)
- La ruptura catalana. Les eleccions del 15 de juny de 1977 (Afers, 2002)
- Recuperació de la memòria històrica o reparació moral de les víctimes? (L'Avenç, núm 314, 2006)
- La veu del PSUC. Josep Solè Barberà (1913–1988) (L'Avenç, 2007; hi ha versió castellana a RBA, 2008)

=== Other works ===
- Aracil, Rafael; Segura, Antoni; Mayayo i Artal, Andreu. Memòria de la transició a Espanya i a Catalunya IV: els joves de la transició. Universitat de Barcelona. Publicacions i Edicions, juliol 2003. ISBN 978-84-8338-407-7.
- Mayayo i Artal, Andreu. Destrucció del món rural català, la: 1880–1980. Universitat de Barcelona. Publicacions i Edicions, gener 1991. ISBN 978-84-7875-117-4.
- Mayayo i Artal, Andreu. Josep Torrents, (1899–1943): pagès de Bellveí del Penedès: dirigent agrari català. El Mèdol, abril 1988. ISBN 978-84-86542-08-5.
