= Land and Freedom Column =

Republican military unit in the Spanish Civil War

- Columna Tierra y Libertad
- Active: 1936–1937
- Country: Spanish Republic
- Allegiance: CNT-FAI
- Branch: Confederal militias
- Type: Militia
- Role: Home defense
- Size: 2,000
- Engagements: Spanish Civil War: Siege of Madrid, Aragon front

Commanders
- Notable commanders: Germinal de Souza

The Land and Freedom Column was a militia column organized by the CNT-FAI from the regions of Berguedà and Bages as well as from Barcelona. The column was sent to the Central front in mid-September 1936 to reinforce the republican line against a nationalist force. It had around 1,500 militiamen in its beginnings. The column integrated into the Rosal Column and later fought on the Serra de Montsant front. After the militarization that occurred in the spring of 1937, the column became the 153rd Mixed Brigade.

== History ==
The column first named itself the "Red and Black" however when they arrived in Barcelona they found that there was already another column with the same name. So they changed it to "Land and Freedom", a classic motto of Spanish anarchism. In Barcelona several more centuries were added to the column, which received military training in the barracks controlled by the CNT-FAI. On 7 September they departed for Madrid by train. They were sent as Catalan aid to the central front, the Freedom column of the PSUC and the UGT was also sent in October and the Durruti Column in November. In Madrid the column had about 1,500 militiamen, since several centuries with local militiamen had also attached to it. The column had an artillery battery with two 105 mm guns, named Sacco and Vanzetti, in honor of two Italian-American anarchists executed in 1927.

== Militarization ==
The militarization took place in June 1937. The Land and Freedom Column became the 153rd Mixed Brigade, commanded by Antonio Sabas Amorós and commissioned by Francisco Señer Martínz, both from the CNT. Battalions 609, 610, 611 and 612 were commanded respectively by Antonio Ferrándiz García, Feliciano Llach Bou, Francisco Fausto Nitti and Víctor Gómez Goiri. Their journal was called "New Era". The brigade was attached to the 24th Division. One of the column's soldiers, Pedro Flores, said this on the militarization:

Volunteering is almost non-existent, on the contrary, the number of volunteers has dropped from the first days, meaning that if we want, as we should, to continue the war, we must mobilize, and this could only be done with the army. On the other hand, by not becoming an army, and with volunteerism dwindling, our armed forces would shortly end up in the picture due to the casualties when major operations took place. In other words, as our armed forces decreased, those of the other political sectors increased through the mobilized fifths. [...] with all the force of my senses, I was an enemy of militarization. But, on the other hand, we were immersed in a cruel reality, with which it was difficult to balance feelings and duty, this time being a victim of the latter.

— Pedro Flores

During the militarization process they were stationed in Binéfar and Monzón. There they were caught up in the Barcelona May Days, participating in the events by taking the revolutionary side, in favor of going to Barcelona to take control. Because of this, the Ulysses battalion (610) joined the 127th Brigade, led by the CNT militant Máximo Franco, and they went to Lérida, where they stayed to avoid a breakdown of the Republican side and an eventual "civil war within of the civil war ".

== Military history of the 153rd Mixed Brigade ==
During the collapse of the Aragon front in the spring of 1938, the 153rd Mixed Brigade was caught right in the middle of the Francoist assault and was defeated, retreating to the Segre river. The remains regrouped in Valdomá and on 19 April the brigade was attached to the 30th Division, under communist command, which carried out political maneuvers within the brigade to assassinate and detain libertarian or socialist commanders.

Àngels Casanovas described the brigade's military operations from the Battle of the Ebro to the end of 1938, narrating the circumstances surrounding Miquel Carreras Costajussà's death. Historian José Peirats describes the fate of the Land and Freedom Column:

When the Aragón disaster occurred in the spring of 1938 [referring to the 153rd Brigade], it followed the same fate as the 24th Division, which had been deprived of its command. Then it was added to other Divisions that had communist command, until it fell into the orbit of the 30th Division. The leadership of the Brigade and most of the commanders were achieved by communist greed through a series of maneuvers whose style is unmistakable. Chiefs and officers suspected of being anarchists were dismissed, assigned a disposable status, or transferred to other units on remote fronts. Commanders Teresa and Leal [Feliciano Llach] had been dispossessed under various pretexts. The latter had been the hero of the delicate operation across the Segre river, carried out in August 1938, in support of the republican offensive in the Ebro sector.

— Peirats

Finally, during the Catalonia Offensive, the brigade defended Juncosa first, then the Serra de Montsant, then afterwards in Igualada and finally in Santa Coloma de Queralt. The last news from the brigade was received during the defense of Vich on 26 January 1939 Afterwards, most of its fighters ended up in internment camps in southern France. While the majority of republican units dissolved in the last minute chaos, the battalion made up of the former Land and Freedom Column arrived in France united with some 400 fighters.

== Tribute ==
In 2001, a cultural association called Columna Terra i Llibertat was founded in Berga, which took over the Center for Libertarian Studies from Josep Ester i Borrás, a member of the column. An annex on the premises of the Study Center was opened to the association, which received the name Ateneu Columna Terra i Llibertat .

== See also ==
- Anarchism in Spain
- Ramon Vila Capdevila

== Bibliography ==
- Flores, Pedro. Memoirs of Pedro Flores . Bages Study Center. Manresa, 2003.
- Casanovas y Romeo, Angels. Miquel Carreras Costajussà (1905–1938) . Abbey of Montserrat Publications, S.A., 2011.
- Peirats, Josep. "Anarchists in the Spanish political crisis." Libertarian Utopia, Buenos Aires 2006
- Peirats, Josep. "The CNT in the Spanish Revolution." Mother Earth Editions. Madrid, 1988.
