= Philip Aranda =

Spanish Jesuit theologian (1642-1695)

Philip Aranda (3 February 1642 - 3 June 1695) was a Spanish Jesuit theologian.

== Biography ==
Aranda was born at Moneva in Aragon. He entered the Society of Jesus in 1658, and taught theology and philosophy at Zaragoza.

He was connected with the Inquisition of Aragon and was synodal examiner of the Archdiocese of Zaragoza.

He is described by Father Michel de St. Joseph, in his "Biographica Critica", as "a most acute theologian, eloquent in speech, and a most practical and expert athlete in the scholastic arena".

He was fiercely attacked in a satirical work by Martin Serra, a Dominican, who declaimed against "the indifferent, headless, inefficacious writings of certain theologians, especially the olla podrida of Father Philip Aranda", an assault which almost evoked an interdict against the church of the friar.

He died at Zaragoza in 1695.

== Works ==
He published a treatise in 1693, "De Deo sciente, praedestinante et auxiliante", which examines ably the entire subject of scientia media, and solidly and subtlety expounds and illustrates the questions of predestination and divine grace. He explains the mind of St. Augustine, and "without difficulty", it was said, gave the meaning of his difficult expressions, maintaining that they had no reference whatever to predestination; a word which he contends was never, even equivalently, used by the Great Doctor. He adds an appendix on why the procession of the Second Person is called generation.

He wrote on the Incarnation and Redemption; on the natural and supernatural operation of man; on human acts; on good and evil; and on the supernatural.

He wrote also a "Life of the Servant of God, Isabel Pobar".
