= Francisco Señer Martín =

Spanish trade unionist

- Born: 13 August 1906; Barcelona, Spain
- Died: 16 August 1973 (aged 67); Paris, France
- Military career
- Allegiance: CNT
- Service: Confederal militias (1936-1937), Spanish Republican Army (1937-1939)
- Service years: 1936-1939
- Units: 153rd Mixed Brigade, 24th Division, 32nd Division

Francisco Señor Martín (13 August 1906, in Spain – 16 August 1973, in France) was a Spanish trade unionist.

== Biography ==
A member of the National Confederation of Labor (Spanish: Confederación Nacional del Trabajo, CNT), in his youth was an active member of the metal union of the CNT in Barcelona. In 1932 he was a member of the National Committee of the CNT, whose general secretary was Manuel Rivas Barros, and the following year he was a delegate for the manufacturing sector in the Catalan regional plenum.

After the outbreak of the Spanish Civil War he joined the confederal militias. He later became a political commissar of the People's Army of the Republic, serving in the 153rd Mixed Brigade as well as the 24th and 32nd divisions, operating on the fronts of Aragon and Catalonia.

At the end of the war he went into exile in France. During the years of the Nazi occupation, he was one of the delegates in Toulouse of the clandestine leadership of the CNT - established in Marseille in December 1943. In March 1944, during the plenary session of Muret, he was elected a member of the National Committee of the CNT. In this capacity, he was one of the signatories to the constitution of the Junta Española de Liberación (JEL) in Toulouse, on 23 October 1944.

He died in Paris on 16 August 1973.

He left a widow, Aurora Barceló (born 29 July 1908, died 22 July 1993), and 4 children:

- François (born 15 March 1930),

- Aurore (born on 15 May 1934),

- Michel (born 26 November 1939) and

- Armonie (born 15 February 1946).

== Bibliography ==
- Álvarez, Santiago (1989). Los comisarios políticos en el Ejército Popular de la República (in Spanish). Ediciós do Castro.
- Borrás, José (1976). Políticas de los exilados españoles 1944-1950 (in Spanish). Ed. Ruedo Ibérico.
- Téllez, Antonio (1996). La Red de Evasión del Grupo Ponzán. Anarquistas en la guerra secreta contra el franquismo y el nazismo (1936-1944) (in Spanish). Barcelona: Editorial Virus.
