= Miguel Chueca Cuartero =

Spanish anarcho-syndicalist (1901–1966)

Councillor of Labor
- In office 21 December 1936 – 10 August 1937
- President: Joaquín Ascaso Budría
- Constituency: Aragon

Personal details
- Born: 3 January 1901 Fuendejalón, Zaragoza, Aragon
- Died: 18 October 1966 (aged 65) Paris, France
- Cause of death: Car accident
- Citizenship: Spain
- Party: CNT-FAI
- Parents: Bernardo Chueca Sancho (father); María Cuartero Ibáñez (mother)

Military service
- Allegiance: Republican faction
- Branch/service: Spanish Republican Army
- Years of service: 1938–1939
- Unit: Machine Gun Battalion C
- Battles/wars: Spanish Civil War

Miguel Chueca Cuartero (3 January 1901 – 18 October 1966) was an Aragonese anarcho-syndicalist.

== Biography ==
=== Early years ===
Miguel Chueca Cuartero was born in Fuendejalón on 3 January 1901. His father, Bernardo Chueca Sancho, was the village mayor but fell into alcoholism after the death of his wife and gradually got rid of his estate. In 1917, Miguel moved to Barcelona, where he worked as a carpenter and obtained his master's degree. In 1924 he joined the CNT and collaborated in El Productor of Blanes. In the late 1920s he moved to Zaragoza, where he worked as a librarian and collaborated with the magazine Cierzo. He was vice-president of the Republican Youth and vehemently defended the federalist and reformist theses of Joaquín Costa.

On 9 September 1929, he was sentenced to two years in prison and fined 1,000 pesetas for conspiracy to rebel, but in August 1930 he still managed to speak at a Pro Amnesty rallies. Between 1930 and 1931 he was editor of La Antorcha and Cultura y Acción. In July 1930 he participated in the reorganizing commission of the CNT.

On 12 December 1930, he took an active part in the Jaca uprising. He participated in the preparations carried out by the National Revolutionary Committee (CRN) and contacted the UGT and the CNT to support the military uprising by calling a general strike, coordinated with Antonio Ejarque Pina from Zaragoza and Ramon Acín Aquilué from Huesca. The failure of the insurrection led to his imprisonment in Torrero on 3 January 1931 and prosecution for a conspiracy offense. But, on 4 March, during the proclamation of the Second Spanish Republic, the doors of the Torrero prison were opened and the prisoners were released.

=== Republic and civil war ===
During the time of the Second Republic Chueca led an anti-religious campaign and defended Joan Garcia Oliver's theses on so-called "revolutionary gymnastics". On 27 September 1931, he participated in the Regional Congress of the CNT in Zaragoza, aligning himself with the maximalist theses of Joaquín Ascaso Budría, in favor of a revolutionary general strike. In 1932 he helped organize the constitution of the National Federation of Railway Industries (FNIF) of the CNT and provided propaganda support for the Alt Llobregat insurrection. On 13 July 1935, he was arrested following the assassination of the scab leader at the Puente del Pilar works. After leaving prison he continued his propagandistic tasks, touring through different towns of Aragon and Navarre until July 1936.

At the beginning of 1936, he met with the civilian governor of Zaragoza, Ángel Vera Coronel, in order to obtain weapons in the event of a possible military coup, but he refused. At an assembly of militants in Zaragoza, his thesis, in favor of taking up arms by force, was defeated by that of Miquel Abós Serena, a supporter of negotiation. When the Spanish coup of July 1936 took hold of Zaragoza, he managed to escape to Casp and in October 1936 he took part in the constitution of the Regional Defense Council of Aragon, of which he was labor councilor, vice-president and delegate of the regional committee of the CNT. In March 1937, Chueca defended the Council of Defense of Aragon in the Regional Plenary session of Alcañiz.

He sided with the Friends of Durruti group, but after the fall of the Aragon front in April 1938 he was replaced in the Regional Committee and appointed political commissar of Machine Gun Battalion C, commanded by Agustín Remiro Manero.

=== Exile and death ===
At the end of the Spanish Civil War Chueca went into exile in France. In 1941 he settled in Montauban, where he worked as a lumberjack. Around 1942 he collaborated in the escape network of Francisco Ponzán Vidal, but was captured and interned in Camp Vernet. In 1944 he signed the constitution of the Junta Española de Liberación on behalf of the Spanish Libertarian Movement, and participated in numerous rallies in various Occitan cities. He was appointed secretary of propaganda of the CNT and advocated for organizing an alliance with the UGT. From 1945 to 1946 he was in charge of the CNT's treasury, but in 1948 he was expelled for participating in the pro-communist Congress of Vienna. Over the years he became blind and died in Paris when he was hit by a truck on 18 October 1966.
