= 117th Mixed Brigade =

- 117.ª Brigada Mixta
- Active: April 1937 – January 1939
- Country: Spanish Republic
- Allegiance: Republican faction
- Branch: Spanish Republican Army
- Type: Infantry
- Size: Brigade
- Part of: 25th Division
- Engagements: Spanish Civil War

The 117th Mixed Brigade was a unit of the Spanish Republican Army created during the Spanish Civil War.

== History ==
The 117th Mixed Brigade was created on April 28, 1937, from the 2nd Regiment of the old South Ebro Column. It was incorporated into the newly created 25th Division.

In June 1937, it participated in the Huesca Offensive. A few months later it took part in the Battle of Belchite. On August 25, together with the 32nd and 131st mixed brigades, it took the railway station. The brigades then made a pincer movement around Belchite, surrounding it from both ends. The 117th MB also took the bullring and some houses. In the following days the unit captured the "Romanico" position, the electricity transformer and the Belchite water tank. After the fighting ended, on September 6 it received an order to withdraw and move to Lécera.

In December 1937, it participated in the Battle of Teruel, attacking in the area of the cemetery. Although the brigade came to take the first nationalist trenches, the general attempt ended in failure. The 117th MB would also see action during the Battle of Alfambra, although its participation was a disaster: on February 21, 1938, it withdrew from the front, completely demoralized after an aerial bombardment. saw action during the Aragon Offensive and, later, during the Levante Offensive.

In January 1939, it was sent by ship to Catalunya, as a reinforcement of the republican forces deployed there. It was by then under the command of Bartolomé Palazón Blaya. However, its intervention would be null and void and it joined the republican retreat towards France.

== Command ==
Commanders

- Agustín Barrios Corredera;
- Joaquín Fran;
- J. Carreras;
- Bartolomé Palazón Blaya

Commissars

- Sebastián Badía Antiñana

== See also ==
- Mixed Brigades
- South Ebro Column

== Bibliography ==
- Engel, Carlos (1999). Historia de las Brigadas Mixtas del Ejército Popular de la República (in Spanish). Madrid: Almena. ISBN 84-922644-7-0.
- Maldonado, José María (2007). El frente de Aragón. La Guerra Civil en Aragón (1936-1938) (in Spanish). Mira Editores.
- Michonneau, Stéphane (2017). Fue ayer: Belchite. Un pueblo frente a la cuestión del pasado (in Spanish). Prensas de la Universidad de Zaragoza.
- Salas Larrazábal, Ramón (2000). Historia del Ejército Popular de la República (in Spanish). La Esfera de los Libros. ISBN 84-9734-465-0.
- Zaragoza, Cristóbal (1983). Ejército Popular y Militares de la República, 1936-1939 (in Spanish). Barcelona: Ed. Planeta.
