= Domingo Tirado Benedí =

Spanish-born Mexican educator (1898–1971)

Domingo Tirado Benedí (September 7, 1898, in Campillo de Aragón, Zaragoza, Aragón, Spain – January 1, 1971, in Mexico City) was a Spanish-born educator.

Collaborated on the Diccionario de Pedagogía Labor (1936) and, like many other artists, scientists and intellectuals, relocated to Mexico during the Spanish Civil War. In Mexico he edited La Ciencia de la Educación with another Spanish exile, Santiago Hernández Ruiz and formed part of the Technical Council of Normal Education. He was of significant influence in pedagogy in Mexico writing, editing and translating books on this topic.

Hernández Ruiz returned to Spain in the 1960s but Tirado remained in Mexico. He died in Mexico City in 1971.

== Publications ==
- La enseñanza de las ciencias de la naturaleza
- El problema de los fines generales de la educación y la enseñanza
- Sociología de la educación
- Métodos de educación y enseñanza
- Problemas de la educación mexicana
- Cooperativas, talleres y granjas escolares
- Problemas de organización escolar
