= 118th Mixed Brigade =

- 118.ª Brigada Mixta
- Active: April 1937 – March 1939
- Country: Spanish Republic
- Allegiance: Republican faction
- Branch: Spanish Civil War
- Type: Infantry
- Size: Brigade
- Part of: 25th Division
- Engagements: Spanish Civil War

The 118th Mixed Brigade was a unit of the Spanish Republican Army created during the Spanish Civil War.

== History ==
The brigade was created on April 28, 1937, from the old Carod-Ferrer Column, made up of anarchist militiamen, and was integrated into the 25th Division. The first head of the unit was the militia major Victoriano Castán Guillén, while Saturnino Carod Lerín of the CNT was appointed as political commissioner.

In June 1937, it took part in the Huesca Offensive, which ended in failure. A few months later it took part in the Battle of Belchite, participating in the capture of the town. On October 6, it withdrew from Belchite to the rear, settling in Caspe. During this period, the unit was reorganized.

In December 1937, the 118th MB was sent to the Teruel Front, taking part in the capture of the city; it fought in the Old Cemetery and in the Hermitage of Santa Bárbara, reaching the vicinity of the urban area. The old cemetery was occupied by the brigade on December 21, and two days later it took the Hermitage of Santa Bárbara and the position of "El Mansueto." On January 1, 1938, it managed to stop an enemy counteroffensive that threatened to break the republican siege on Teruel, although it suffered a high number of casualties. It still had the strength to go to reestablish the front threatened by the national troops who were trying to lift the siege, although the brigade came out of the fight very broken. In February 1938, it fought in the Battle of Alfambra as a reserve for the 217th Mixed Brigade, although both units withdrew.

On March 3, 1938, it became part of the Levante Army reserve. After the beginning of the Aragon Offensive, it was sent to the Alcañiz sector, although she withdrew in the face of enemy superiority. Around March 17, he was in Alcorisa, where it established its headquarters. Later it intervened in the Levante Offensive, slowly retreating through the Maestrazgo area until reaching the XYZ Line around July 21, 1938. The brigade remained on the Levante front until the end of the war, without intervening in relevant operations.

== Command ==
Commanders

- Victoriano Castán Guillén;
- Gerardo Valderías Francés

Comisarios

- Saturnino Carod Lerín

== See also ==
- Carod-Ferrer Column
- Mixed Brigades

== Bibliography ==
- Alpert, Michael (2013). The Republican Army in the Spanish Civil War, 1936-1939. Cambridge University Press.
- Engel, Carlos (1999). Historia de las Brigadas Mixtas del Ejército Popular de la República (in Spanish). Madrid: Almena. ISBN 84-922644-7-0.
- Maldonado, José María (2007). El frente de Aragón. La Guerra Civil en Aragón (1936-1938) (in Spanish). Mira Editores.
- Salas Larrazábal, Ramón (2000). Historia del Ejército Popular de la República (in Spanish). La Esfera de los Libros. ISBN 84-9734-465-0.
- Zaragoza, Cristóbal (1983). Ejército Popular y Militares de la República, 1936-1939 (in Spanish). Barcelona: Ed. Planeta.
