= 25th Division (Spain) =

- 25.ª División
- Active: 28 April 1937 - 27 March 1939
- Disbanded: 27 March 1939
- Country: Spanish Republic
- Allegiance: Republican faction
- Branch: Spanish Republican Army
- Type: Infantry
- Size: Division
- Engagements: Spanish Civil War; Huesca Offensive; Battle of Belchit; Battle of Teruel; Levante Offensive

The 25th Division was one of the divisions of the Spanish Republican Army that were organised during the Spanish Civil War on the basis of the Mixed Brigades. It participated in the battles of Huesca, Belchit, Teruel and Levante.

== History ==
The division was created in April 1937, within the incipient Eastern Army. It was organised from the old Jubert Division, which in turn had been the former Ortiz Column of anarchist militiamen.

The new unit was made up of the 116th, 117th, 118th mixed brigades, and a few weeks later was integrated into the also recently created 12th Army Corps. In June it participated in the Huesca Offensive. On the night of 9–10 June, troops from the 25th Division began a diversionary action on the enemy front, occupying various positions; The general operation, however, did not yield the desired results and would eventually fail. At the end of August some of its units took part in the Zaragoza Offensive —especially, the 116th Mixed Brigade, (Note: The 116th Mixed Brigade would intervene in the operation integrated into the so-called "D" Group, commanded by Juan Modesto; The 117th Mixed Brigade, for its part, was located in front of Belchit, while the 118th Mixed Brigade would operate separately — as well as the 131st Mixed Brigade, of the 30th Division.) standing out significantly during the Battle of Belchit. However, the commander of the division, Antonio Ortiz Ramírez, was dismissed after the battle of Belchit and replaced by Miguel García Vivancos.

In December, during the Battle of Teruel, it was integrated together with the 11th Division into the 22nd Army Corps. The forces of the 25th Division managed to conquer the Old Cemetery, the Hermitage of Santa Bárbara and the position of «El Mansueto», although they came out of the fighting very broken. After the battle was over, the unit was placed in the rear as a reserve force. During the Aragon Offensive, in March 1938, the unit was forced to withdraw due to enemy pressure. It ended up retreating to the south of the Ebro, after the Republican zone was cut in two. During these weeks the division was attached to various army corps.

Later it was integrated into the 17th Army Corps, together with the 40th and 65th divisions. Between May and July it intervened very actively in the Levante Offensive, taking outstanding action during the republican defence of Caudiel. For the remainder of the war, the unit remained at rest, not participating in any further interventions.

== Leaders ==
Commanders

- Antonio Ortiz Ramírez;
- Miguel García Vivancos;
- Manuel Cristóbal Errandonea;
- Eusebio Sanz Asensio;
- Víctor Álvarez González

Commissars

- Saturnino Carod Lerín;
- Antonio Ejarque Pina

Chief of Staff

- Alfredo Navarro Sanganetti

== Battles ==
Date	Attached Army Corps	Integrated Mixed Brigades	Battle front
May–June 1937	12th	116th, 117th, 118th	Aragón
December 1937	22nd	116th, 117th, 118th	Teruel
May 1938	21st	116th, 117th, 118th	Levante
July 1938	27th	116th, 117th, 118th	Levante
March 1939	13th	116th, 118th	Levante

== See also ==
- Spanish Republican Army
- List of Spanish Republican divisions

== Bibliography ==
- Alpert, Michael (2013). The Republican Army in the Spanish Civil War, 1936-1939. Cambridge University Press.
- Álvarez, Santiago (1989). Los comisarios políticos en el Ejército Popular de la República (in Spanish). Ediciós do Castro.
- Cardona, Gabriel (2006). Historia militar de una guerra civil. Estrategias y tácticas de la guerra de España (in Spanish). Flor del Viento Ediciones.
- Engel, Carlos (1999). Historia de las Brigadas Mixtas del Ejército Popular de la República (in Spanish). Madrid, Almena. ISBN 84-922644-7-0.
- Juan Navarro, Ramón (2010). Resistir es vencer. El frente de Viver en la Guerra Civil española (in Spanish). Lulu.com. ISBN 978-1-4466-9664-4.
- Maldonado, José María (2007). El frente de Aragón. La Guerra Civil en Aragón (1936-1938) (in Spanish). Mira Editores.
- Martínez Bande, José Manuel (1970). La Invasión de Aragón y el desembarco en Mallorca (in Spanish). Madrid: Ed. San Martín.
- Martínez Bande, José Manuel (1973). La Gran ofensiva sobre Zaragoza (in Spanish). Madrid: Editorial San Martín.
- Martínez Bande, José Manuel (1975). La llegada al mar (in Spanish). Madrid: Editorial San Martín.
- Martínez Bande, José Manuel (1977). La ofensiva sobre Valencia (in Spanish). Madrid: Editorial San Martín.
- Pagès i Blanch, Pelai (2007). Cataluña en guerra y en revolución (1936-1939) (in Spanish). Espuela de Plata.
- Salas Larrazábal, Ramón (2006). Historia del Ejército Popular de la República (in Spanish). La Esfera de los Libros. ISBN 84-9734-465-0.
- Téllez, Antonio (1996). La Red de Evasión del Grupo Ponzán. Anarquistas en la guerra secreta contra el franquismo y el nazismo (1936-1944) (in Spanish). Barcelona: Editorial Virus.
- Thomas, Hugh (1976). Historia de la Guerra Civil Española. Barcelona: Círculo de Lectores. ISBN 84-226-0874-X.
- Zaragoza, Cristóbal (1983). Ejército Popular y Militares de la República, 1936-1939 (in Spanish). Barcelona: Ed. Planeta.
