= XII Army Corps (Spain) =

- XII Cuerpo de Ejército
- Active: June 1937–February 1939
- Country: Spain
- Allegiance: (Second Spanish Republic) Republican faction
- Branch: Spanish Republican Army
- Type: Infantry
- Size: Army Corps
- Engagements: Spanish Civil War: Zaragoza Offensive; Aragon Offensive; Battle of the Segre; Battle of the Ebro; Catalonia Offensive

Commanders
- Notable commanders: Etelvino Vega

The XII Army Corps was a military formation belonging to the Spanish Republican Army that fought during the Spanish Civil War. Formed by veteran units, throughout the war it took part in prominent intervention in some of the main battles of the war, such as Aragon or the Ebro.

== History ==
The formation was created in June 1937, within the Eastern Army. At the end of August some of its units intervened in the Zaragoza Offensive, distinguishing the 25th Division in the Battle of Belchite. (Note: There are doubts about whether it was the commander of the XII Army Corps, Pedro Sánchez Plaza, the officer in command of the conquest of Belchite —whose sector was within the area assigned to the XII Army Corps. Other sources indicate that the command would have belonged to Karol Świerczewski, commander of the 35th Division.)

In March 1938, at the beginning of the Aragon Offensive, the XII Army Corps had established its headquarters in Alcorisa and integrated the 24th, 30th and 44th divisions; it covered the front that ran from the Ebro river to Vivel del Río Martín. During the withdrawal from Aragon, the formation suffered significant losses and was undone. After the republican zone was cut in two, it was isolated in Catalonia. After being briefly dissolved, the XII Corps was rebuilt (Note: In March-April 1938, a "B" Army Corps was created in the Segre area - formed by the 16th Division, which was under the command of Claudio Martín Barco; this formation later adopted the definitive numbering of "XII", receiving more reinforcement divisions.) and assigned to Ebro Army, grouping within the divisions 16th, 44th and 56th. The militia major Etelvino Vega was appointed as the new commander of the XII Army Corps.

The 16th and 44th divisions came to participate in the fighting on the Ebro, supporting the forces of the V and XV army corps. The 56th Division remained on the Segre front, where it intervened in the attacks against Vilanova de la Barca and Seròs.

At the beginning of the Catalonia Offensive the XII Army Corps covered the line of the Segre River. Its units, however they had a bad performance against the nationalist offensive; the 56th Division was practically disbanded, while the 16th Division was powerless to offer an organized defense. As a consequence, Etelvino Vega was instantly dismissed at the beginning of January 1939, being replaced by Francisco Galán. The XII Army Corps, however, was unable to resist the enemy pressure and undertook the retreat towards the French border.

== Controls ==
Commanders

- Pedro Sánchez Plaza;
- Claudio Martín Barco;
- Etelvino Vega;
- Francisco Galán;

Commissars

- Juan Moles Martínez, of the ERC;
- Virgilio Llanos Manteca, of the PSUC;
- Saturnino Pérez Martínez, of the CNT;

Chiefs of Staff

- Luis Fernández Ortigosa;
- Anastasio Santiago Rojo;
- Pedro Ferrando Laura;
- Ángel Calvo Herrera;

== Order of battle ==
Date	Attached Army	Integrated divisions	Battlefront
June-July 1937	Eastern Army	25th, 30th and 44th	Aragon
October 1937	Eastern Army	25th and 30th	Aragon
December 1937	Eastern Army	24th, 30th and 44th	Aragon
April 1938	Autonomous Group of the Ebro	16th, 44th and 56th	Segre-Ebro
July 1938	Ebro Army	16th, 44th and 56th	Segre-Ebro

== Bibliography ==
- Alpert, Michael (1989). El Ejército Republicano en la Guerra Civil (in Spanish). Madrid: Siglo XXI de España. ISBN 9788432306822.
- Beevor, Antony (2005). La Guerra civil española (in Spanish). Editorial Crítica.
- Cabrera Castillo, Francisco (2002). Del Ebro a Gandesa. La batalla del Ebro, julio-noviembre 1938 (in Spanish). Almena.
- Engel, Carlos (1999). Historia de las Brigadas Mixtas del Ejército Popular de la República (in Spanish). Madrid: Almena. 84-922644-7-0.
- Maldonado, José M.ª (2007). El frente de Aragón. La Guerra Civil en Aragón (1936–1938) (in Spanish). Mira Editores. ISBN 978-84-8465-237-3.
- Martínez Bande, José Manuel (1975). La llegada al mar (in Spanish). Madrid: Editorial San Martín.
- Martínez Bande, José Manuel (1978). La Batalla del Ebro (in Spanish). Madrid: Ed. San Martín.
- Martínez Bande, José Manuel (1979). La Campaña de Cataluña (in Spanish). Madrid: Ed. San Martín.
- Martínez Reverte, Jorge (2006). La caída de Cataluña (in Spanish). Barcelona: Crítica.
- Michonneau, Stéphane (2017). Fue ayer: Belchite. Un pueblo frente a la cuestión del pasado (in Spanish). Prensas de la Universidad de Zaragoza.
- Salas Larrazábal, Ramón (2006). Historia del Ejército Popular de la República (in Spanish). La Esfera de los Libros. ISBN 84-9734-465-0.
- Thomas, Hugh (1976). Historia de la Guerra Civil Española (in Spanish). Barcelona: Círculo de Lectores. ISBN 84-226-0874-X.
- Zaragoza, Cristóbal (1983). Ejército Popular y Militares de la República, 1936-1939 (in Spanish). Barcelona: Ed. Planeta.
