= Samper de Calanda =

- municipality
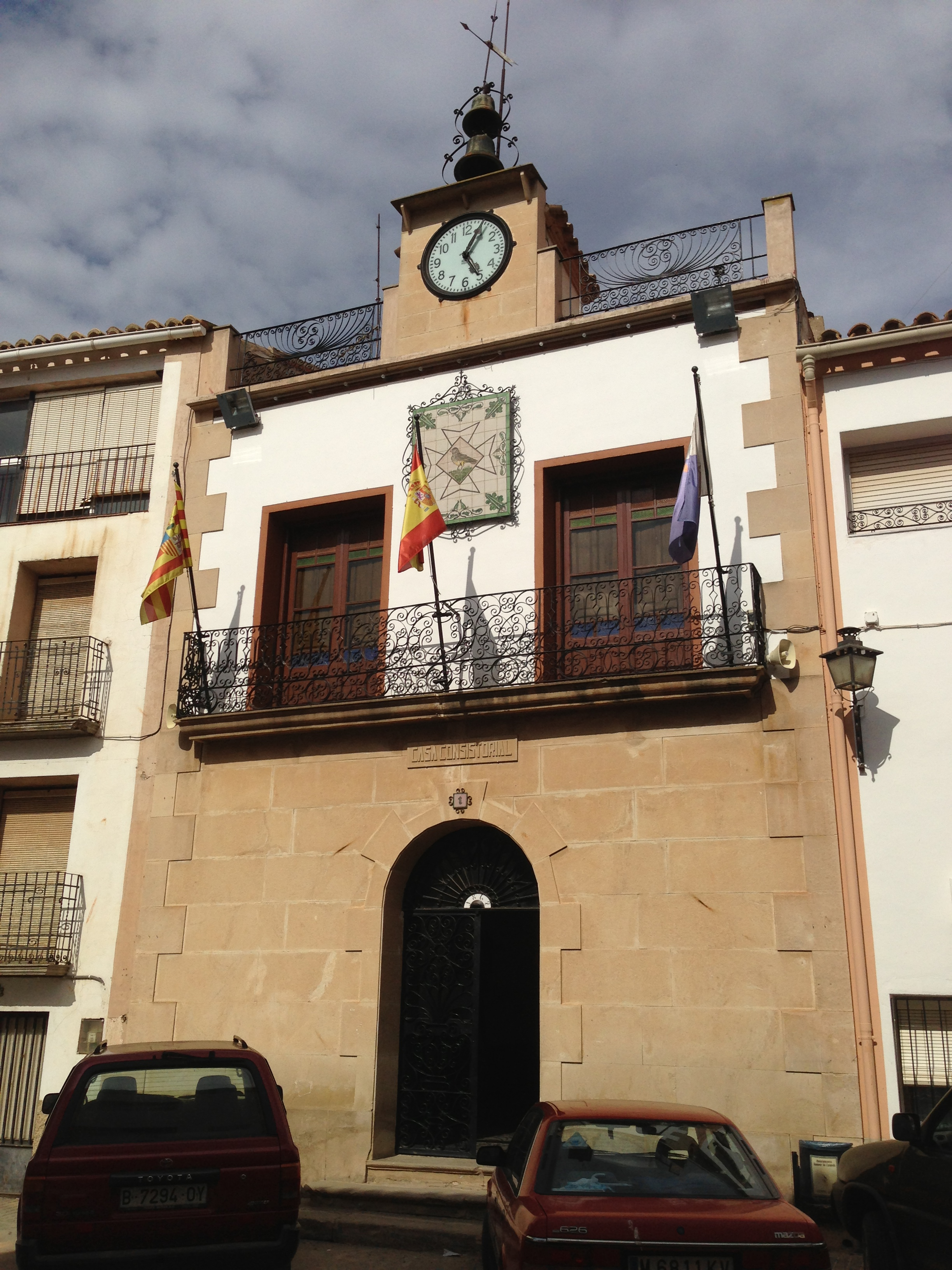
- Town hall

- Coat of arms

- Location within Spain
- Coordinates: 41°11′N 0°23′W
- Country: Spain
- Autonomous community: Aragon
- Province: Teruel
- Municipality: Samper de Calanda

Area
  - Total: 142.80 km^{2} (55.14 sq mi)
- Elevation: 258 m (846 ft)

Population (2025-01-01)
  - Total: 734
  - Density: 5.14/km^{2} (13.3/sq mi)
- Time zone: UTC+1 (CET)
  - Summer (DST): UTC+2 (CEST)

Samper de Calanda is a municipality located in the province of Teruel, Aragon, Spain. According to the 2004 census (INE), the municipality had a population of 984 inhabitants.
