= Antonio Ortiz Ramírez =

Spanish anarcho-syndicalist and anarchist (1907–1996)

- Antoni Ortiz Ramírez
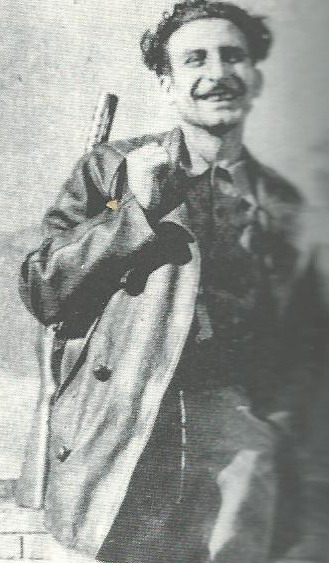
- Born: 13 April 1907; Barcelona, Spain
- Died: 2 April 1996 (aged 88); Barcelona, Spain
- Military career
- Allegiance: CNT-FAI
- Service: Confederal militias (1936–1937), Spanish Republican Army (1937–1938), Free French Army (1942–1945)
- Service years: 1936–1945
- Units: South Ebro Column (1936–1937), 25th Division (1937), 24th Division (1938)
- Conflicts: Spanish Civil War, World War II

Antonio Ortiz Ramírez (13 April 1907 – 2 April 1996) was a prominent member of the National Confederation of Labor and the Iberian Anarchist Federation. He dedicated himself to woodworking throughout his life, held various positions of responsibility in the Barcelona Wood Union, belonged to the anarchist group "Nosotros", held the position of commander of the South Ebro Column, he also served an officer in the French Resistance and participated in a botched attack against Franco. After the Spanish Civil War he went into exile in France and later in Latin America.

== Biography ==
=== Childhood and adolescence ===
He was born in the Poblenou neighborhood of Barcelona, the son of Valencian emigrants from Pedralba. Poblenou, being an industrial center, developed a deep union life in which Ortiz participated: at the age of 8 or 9 he attended a talk by Ángel Pestaña and regularly attended the Flor de Mayo cooperative where cultural activities were developed. At the age of 11, he began to work, as a result of his father's accident, to attend to family needs. From that age he worked in different carpentry shops and for some time he combined work and studies. In 1921, at the age of fourteen, he joined the CNT's Wood Union. During the dictatorship of Primo de Rivera he maintained the clandestine contribution, helped distribute Solidaridad Obrera and got involved in different cultural activities.

=== Militancy ===
==== Republic ====
With the fall of the dictatorship and the proclamation of the Second Spanish Republic, the CNT experienced a great expansion. The anarcho-syndicalist organization was experiencing a bitter debate at that time between the Trentistas and Faístas. Ortiz was akin to the Faist tendency, of which Buenaventura Durruti and Juan García Oliver were notable representatives. He published some articles in the CNT's newspaper, Solidaridad Obrera, joined the Poblenou defense committee and accepted responsibilities in the Wood Union, of which he was appointed president in 1932. A few days after his appointment, a strike by the cabinetmakers' section began when the employers did not accept the union's demands: a 44-hour week, that the tools were in charge of the employers and abolition of all week-long festivities except for 1 May. The strike began on 14 November and ended in mid-April of the following year, its duration was due to the fact that the conflict was not reduced to a labor issue (It was understood that the requests were very moderate and would be accepted without problem), but was part of the power struggle between the CNT on the one hand and the UGT and the state on the other, entities that the anarchist union did not recognize. While the strike was taking place, Ortiz was arrested for another reason: the January 1933 insurrection. The police detained him on his way to L'Hospitalet after having clashes in Atarazanas and El Clot. During his detention, together with other detainees, he suffered torture which, although overshadowed by the events in Casas Viejas, was later denounced in the press. During his time in prison, he became friends with García Oliver, with whom he would show great ideological affinity and would be the one to later introduce him to the Nosotros group. Upon leaving prison at the end of 1933, he joined the group together with Durruti, García Oliver, Francisco Ascaso, Gregorio Jover, Ricardo Sanz, José Pérez Ibáñez and Aurelio Fernández. In mid-1935 he was arrested along with Durruti, Aurelio Fernández and Ascaso. The prisoners were transferred from Barcelona to the Valencia prison, where they left a few weeks before the 1936 elections were called. From the election to the war, Ortiz was very present at rallies and conferences.

==== The Civil War ====
The days prior to the coup of July 1936 were very busy for Ortiz: he made an arms exchange in Asturias and coordinated with some related officers to sabotage the coup. During the time that the fight lasted in Barcelona, he was present at the confrontations in Parallel and in the taking of the Atarazanas. He was present at the meeting that representatives of the CNT had with Lluís Companys and at the plenary session in which it was decided to collaborate with the other political forces.

Once the fight in Barcelona was decided, the Committee of Antifascist Militias was formed, which ordered Ortíz to organize a column of militiamen to occupy the towns between Zaragoza and Caspe. The column left Barcelona on 24 July with around 800 men and arrived in Caspe on the next day. In addition to the militants from Barcelona, the column was reinforced by dispersed groups and other smaller columns. Finally the front was extended between Azuara and Sástago, with 4 different sectors, and the general staff in Caspe. Ortíz participated in the extraordinary plenary session of unions in Bujaraloz which agreed on the creation, functions and powers of the Regional Defence Council of Aragon. In the debates that took place, he positioned himself as against the council having powers in matters of war and in favor of appointing Joaquín Ascaso as president of the council. During the process of militarization of the militias, which was subject to the columns accepting the change, he defended it due to the urgent need to obtain weapons for the front. Once finished, he went on to lead the 25th Division.

Maneuvers of the communist 11th Division eventually led to the dissolution of the Council of Aragon, of the collectives, the imprisonment of Joaquín Ascaso and the repression of the libertarian movement in the area. Ortíz kept the 25th division in their positions and defended detained and persecuted militants on numerous occasions, turning the 25th division into a "refuge." Shortly after the dissolution of the council, an offensive began on Zaragoza that pursued a triple intention: to create a distraction to the rebellious side in its northern campaign, to divert attention from the events in Aragon with an attempt to take Zaragoza, and to blame the lack of targets in the same offensive on the confederal divisions columns. As a result of his discrepancies with the way of directing the attack and his refusal to step down, he was relieved of his position on 14 September by García Vivancos. This replacement had been planned by the communists since July 1937.

After his dismissal, he spent a few days in Valencia from where he broke Ascaso out of jail and returned to Barcelona. His destination was pending until December 1937, at which time he joined the Popular School of the General Staff, from which he left as an officer in February. After an attempt to withdraw Ricardo Sanz from the 26th Division, in which he saw an attempt to antagonize him and therefore began to suspect CNT's national committee, he ended up receiving command of the 24th Division, which covered the Segre river line. The Pyrenean position was precarious and Ortiz fundamentally believed that the Communist Party of Spain and even his own organization were setting traps for him to die. He was removed from command and the general staff. The suspicion that they wanted to assassinate him on the way led him to flee to France on 5 July 1938, with ten other men, among them Joaquín Ascaso.

=== Exile ===
==== France ====
They entered France and surrendered to the gendarmes, who took them to Bayonne, where they stayed for 4 days until the French authorities decided that they could not stay in the country and had to leave it. They then went to Andorra, where they were arrested and sent to Perpignan thanks to the efforts of a French deputy. They were there for a month, after which they were sent to different cities, leaving Ortiz in Privas. In September 1938 he and Ascaso suffered an assassination attempt. After surviving the poisoning, they went to Marseille. Here the French police detained them for an extradition demand from the Republican government, but it was voided in the first days of April, and they were released. They went to Paris where they survived off the solidarity of colleagues and acquaintances, because after their flight from Spain and government positions they were expelled from the CNT and stopped receiving the aid they provided. At the end of August, Ortiz went to Perpignan where he got a job through Gregorio Jover. In September, France and Britain declared war on Nazi Germany, complicating the situation for the exiles. The French police arrested Ortiz the same month and send him to the Saint-Cyprien concentration camp. From there he was sent to the fortress of Collioure, and after its closure he was sent to the Vernet d'Ariège internment camp. Here, on 10 May 1940, he received the news that France had fallen to the Nazis. He remained imprisoned there for two years.

==== World War II ====
Those interned in the Vernet d'Ariège Internment Camp that were regarded as more revolutionary and intransigent were deported to Algeria by the French government to work on the railway. He was released after the Allied invasion of North Africa, and he enlisted in the Free French Army as a volunteer for the entire duration of the war. He participated in several battles against the Nazi Afrika Korps and was promoted to sergeant. He embarked for France where the first Allied landing integrated into the French army took place. He progressed through Aix-en-Provence and Lyon, receiving various distinctions from his commanders. His most important participation occurred in the liberation of Belfort, which was worth a distinction signed by Charles De Gaulle. The body in which Ortiz was integrated continued its offensive into German territory, taking Karlsruhe and Pforzheim, where he was wounded.

==== Attack against Franco and exile in Latin America ====
After the end of the war and with the demobilization, Ortiz set up a sawmill in Saverdun together with his friend José Pérez Ibáñez. On 12 September 1948, he was part of a frustrated attack against Francisco Franco. The attack was to be carried out during a frigate competition, aboard a plane from which they would drop bombs. The attack failed because, although the information they had defended that there would be a multitude of planes and they would go unnoticed, there was no private plane flying over the sky. In February 1951, the French press reported the discovery of the plane, so he decided to emigrate to Latin America. He lived in Bolivia and Peru and in 1955 he settled in Venezuela, where he set up a carpentry shop. In 1987 he returned to Barcelona, where he was awarded a salary as a sergeant in the republican army. He died in a nursing home in the La Verneda neighborhood and bequeathed his body to medical research.

== Bibliography ==
- Márquez Rodríguez, José Manuel; Gallardo Romero, Juan José (1999). Ortiz: general sin Dios ni amo. Barcelona: Hacer. ISBN 84-930512-0-9.
