= 44th Division (Spain) =

- 44.ª División
- Flag of the 44th Division
- Active: May 1937–February 1939
- Country: Spanish Republic
- Allegiance: Republican faction
- Branch: Spanish Republican Army
- Type: Infantry Division
- Size: 8,650-8,800 men (1937)
- Part of: XII Army Corps
- Engagements: Spanish Civil War: Zaragoza Offensive; Battle of Belchite; Aragon Offensive; Balaguer Offensive; Battle of the Ebro; Catalonia Offensive

The 44th Division was one of the divisions of the Spanish Republican Army that were created during the Spanish Civil War.

== History ==
=== Formation ===
The 44th Division was formed in May of 1937 in Catalonia. In June 1937, the division became attached to the XII Army Corps. Immediately after troop training was finished, the 44th Division was sent to participate in the Zaragoza Offensive. During the offensive, the division participated in the Battle of Belchite. By the end of 1937, the 44th Division numbered between 8,650 and 8,800 men.

=== 1938 offensives ===
During the Balaguer Offensive, the 44th Division made numerous unsuccessful attacks between 25 May and 28 May, 1938. On August 9, some units of the 44th Division managed to establish a bridgehead on the other side of the Serge river. However, after 3 days of fighting, the division was forced to withdraw. During the Battle of the Ebro, the 44th Division suffered high casualties against Nationalist counterattacks. Combat actions in November left the division's 140th Mixed Brigade severely depleted.

=== Catalonia Offensive and Disbandment ===
The 44th Division was unable to offer effective resistance against the Nationalist Catalonia Offensive. The division's 145th and 146th mixed brigades entrenched themselves in the town of Juncosa but were unable to hold it.

== Bibliography ==
- Maldonado, José M.ª (2007). El frente de Aragón. La Guerra Civil en Aragón (1936–1938). Mira Editores. ISBN 978-84-8465-237-3.
- Álvarez, Santiago (1989). Los comisarios políticos en el Ejército Popular de la República. Ediciós do Castro.
- Engel, Carlos (2005). Historia de las Brigadas Mixtas del Ejército Popular de la República. Madrid, Almena. ISBN 84-922644-7-0.
- Beevor, Antony (2005). La Guerra civil española (in Spanish). Editorial Crítica.
