= Regional Defence Council of Aragon =

Governing body in Aragon, Spain, 1936–1937

Coordinates: 41°14′N 0°02′W

- Autonomous entity of the Second Spanish Republic
- 1936–1937
- Flag Coat of arms

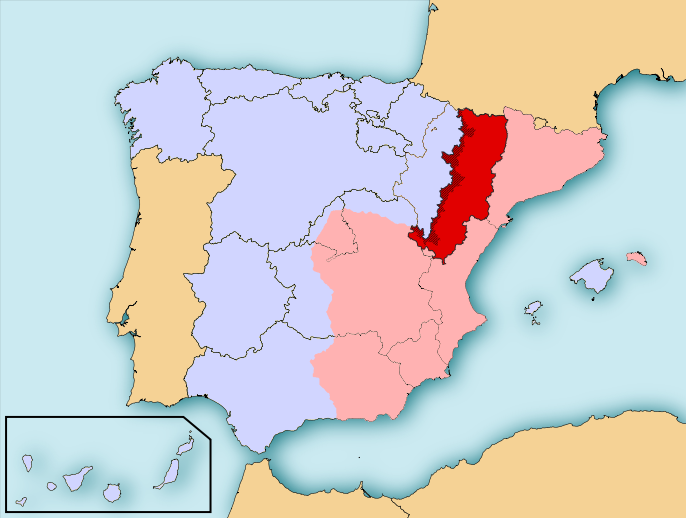
- Territory controlled and administered by the CRDA (in red) within Republican Spain (in pink)
- Capital: Fraga^{a} (until December 1936); Caspe^{a} (from December 1936)
- Demonym: Aragonese
- Government
  - Type: Anarchist commune
  - Motto: Honor y Justicia (Honour and Justice)
- President
  - 1936–1937: Joaquín Ascaso
- Historical era: Spanish Civil War
  - Established: 6 October 1936
  - Legalized by the Second Spanish Republic government: 23 December 1936
  - Dissolved by the Second Spanish Republic government: 10 August 1937
  - Disestablished: 11 August 1937
Preceded by	Succeeded by
Second Spanish Republic	Second Spanish Republic
- Today part of: Spain
- a. Administrative capital

The Regional Defence Council of Aragon was an administrative entity created by the Confederación Nacional del Trabajo (CNT) in the context of the Spanish Revolution, during the Spanish Civil War. Until its dissolution, the CRDA controlled and administered the eastern half of Aragon. The price of goods was centrally controlled to mitigate inflation.

The Council of Aragon was the first autonomous government of Aragon since 1707, becoming a government of its own within the Second Spanish Republic. It was established in its first stage (October to December 1936) by anarchist members of the CNT, with eventual representation of all the anti-fascist forces of the Popular Front from December 1936 until its dissolution. Its life was ephemeral since its activities lasted less than a year until it was dissolved by the republican authorities, pressured by the Communist Party of Spain, in August 1937. During its brief lifespan, it implemented some progressive and revolutionary policies.

== History ==
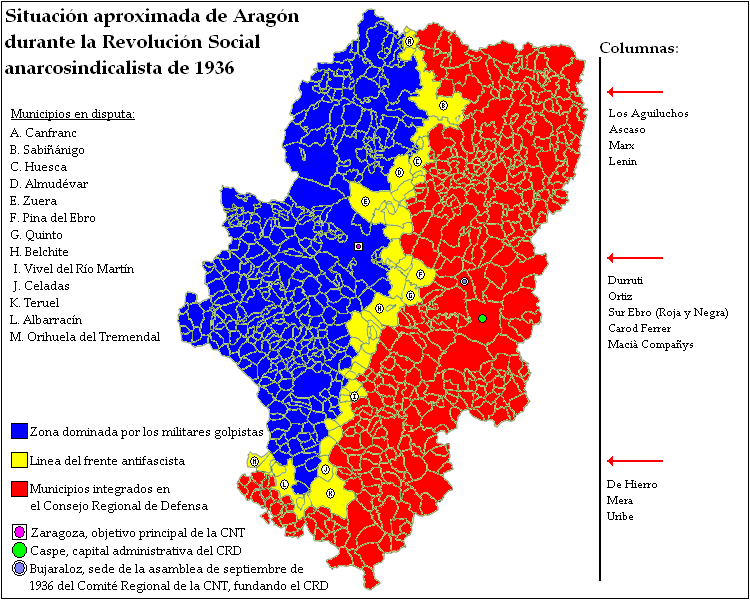
Territory administered by the Regional Defence Council of Aragon (in red).

=== Origins and creation ===
The origins of the Regional Defence Council of Aragon are, for the most part, in the anarcho-syndicalist tradition of the Aragonese peasantry and the influence that the CNT enjoyed in this territory. The revolutionary situation that developed in Aragon happened prior to the arrival of militia columns from Catalonia and Valencia. The arrival of the militia columns from Catalonia was fundamental when it came to defending the victories achieved, given that the workers' militias had seized power and were implanting a social revolution that did not destroy the Republican State but did occupy the power vacuum that the military rebellion had caused. The Madrid government of the Second Spanish Republic and the Catalan government had little influence in Aragon.

After the military coup, in October 1936, a dividing line was established from north to south of Aragon that marked the "Aragon Front"; the western side was occupied by the fascists and the eastern side by Republicans and anarchists. In the areas that theoretically remained under the jurisdiction of the Republic, those who really had the power were the militias that protected the revolutionary committees, almost all of them made up of anarchists who worked outside the Republican State.

On 6 October 1936, the Extraordinary Plenary of Trade Unions and Columns of the Regional Committee of Aragon, Rioja and Navarra of the National Confederation of Labor (CNT) was held at the headquarters of the Durruti Column in Bujaraloz. In addition to the 174 representatives from the CNT unions of 139 Aragonese towns, the National Committee of the CNT and different confederal columns (Durruti Column, Red and Black Column, Los Aguiluchos Column of the FAI, and Carod-Ferrer Column) and numerous members of the Catalonia CNT, prominent representatives of the columns were present, such as Buenaventura Durruti, Gregorio Jover, Antonio Ortiz, Cristóbal Alvaldetrecu and Julián Merino. The call for this important meeting was made by Francisco Carreño, Pablo Ruiz and Julián Merino. The Plenary debated the proposed collaboration with the republican governing bodies, resolving to create, in the margin of the republican governments, Regional Defense Councils linked in a federated way to a National Defense Council, following the directives proposed on 15 September 1936 in Madrid by the National Plenary of the CNT. The Plenary agreed to the creation of the Regional Defense Council of Aragon. This included approximately 450 rural communities, almost all of which were run by the CNT, with just 20 run by the UGT. This situation was not much to the liking of the republican authorities and the Generalitat, but at that time they were forced to accept it.

The Regional Defence Council was based in Caspe and from there formed the main power of revolutionary Aragon. Their leaders soon declared that rural Aragon had become a "Spanish Ukraine" and that they would not allow themselves to be overwhelmed by Marxist militarism, as happened to Russian anarchism in 1921. The Regional Defence Council of Aragon was one of the most prominent and powerful anarchist councils.

=== An ephemeral life ===
Despite its revolutionary origin it was initially recognized on 6 October by government decree. It held its first official assembly on 15 October that year, where Joaquín Ascaso, member of the CNT and cousin of Francisco Ascaso, was elected President of the Council. Although it was not definitively legalized and regulated by the republican government until 23 December 1936, on the condition that other members of the Popular Front were represented in the administration of the Council. From January 1937, the revolutionary character of the Council would be progressively diminished under pressure from the members of the government coalition, whose presence and number gradually increased. For example, in January, Primary education schools (that had been organized by anarcho-syndicalist commissions) returned to government control.

Ascaso received the official appointment of a government delegate on 19 January 1937. In mid-February 1937 a congress, attended by 500 delegates representing 80,000 collectivists from Libertarian Aragon, was held in Caspe with the purpose of creating a regional Federation of Collectives.

It is complicated to estimate figures on the economic management of anarchist communities, since most of the reports are biased according to ideological interests and sympathies. Conservative historian Hugh Thomas argues that coal production in the Utrillas mines only reached one tenth of the pre-war figures. On the other hand, in the documentary Living the Utopia, testimonies and data are collected that would confirm that in many communities production increased. Although many of the collectives had been a success as social communities, for the communists their contribution to the war left much to be desired. The republican government had already tried to establish a coordinated action in this regard, given the needs of the war industry. At the beginning of the summer of 1937, after the May Days, the confiscation of food trucks from the communities by the republican government's carabineros began.

=== Disbandment ===
The independence with which the Regional Council acted had always been an irritant for the republican authorities. Thus, after having re-established its control over Catalonia, the Spanish Republican government, backed by its republican, socialist and communist sectors, was determined to disband this Aragonese entity. Finally on 4 August Indalecio Prieto, the National Defense Minister, ordered the Spanish Republican Army to intervene and the 11th Division, led by Enrique Líster was sent to Aragon, officially disbanding the Aragon Council (Consejo de Aragón) on 10 August.

The dissolution was carried out through a military intervention that occupied the town of Caspe by surprise, to avoid a reaction. The Local CNT Federation of Trade Unions was attacked, and Líster's troops destroyed some of the town as they invaded. Tanks and artillery were concentrated at the exit of the city. There were some clashes and there were casualties. Joaquín Ascaso and the anarchist members of the CRDA were arrested on several charges (among others, Jewelry smuggling). Another 700 anarchists were arrested in the rest of Aragon.

After the dissolution of the Council and the arrest of Ascaso, the Government appointed José Ignacio Mantecón as Governor General to manage the republican territory in the three Aragonese provinces. Mantecón, a former member of the Council and a Left Republican, thus took supreme authority over republican Aragon. The peasants who had managed to stay out of the collectives retook many of them by force, privatizing and redistributing all the food and equipment they had. The offices of the CNT Regional Committee were occupied and their files and records were confiscated by the Republican authorities. Meanwhile, communist military units occupied various collectives of the Ebro valley and upper Aragon. For their part, the leaders of the CNT made every effort to prevent the executions of anarchists, but eventually accepted the dissolution of the "Council of Aragon" as a matter of fact. Subsequently, when crop yields began to fail, some of the broken-up collectives were restored, without making them what they were during the CNT administration. Meanwhile, many anarchists were interned in prisons or concentration camps under republican control until the end of the war.

== Composition ==
Reproduction of the shield of the Regional Defence Council.

According to the CRDA bulletin nº 12, from 21 December 1936, the council composition was as follows:

Cabinet Position	Office Holder	Political Party or Trade Union
President	Joaquín Ascaso	CNT
Public Order	Adolfo Ballano	CNT
Information & Propaganda	Evaristo Viñuales Larroy	CNT
Agriculture	Adolfo Arnal	CNT
Labor	Miguel Chueca Cuartero	CNT
Transport & Communications	Luis Montoliu Salado	CNT
Economy & Supplies	Evelio Martínez	CNT
Justice	José Ignacio Mantecón	IR
Finance	Jesús Gracia	IR
Culture	Manuel Latorre	UGT
Public Works	José Ruiz Borao	UGT
Health & Social Assistance	José Duque	PCE
Industry & Commerce	Custodio Peñarrocha	PCE
General Secretary	Benito Pabón	PS
