= Moneva =

- municipality
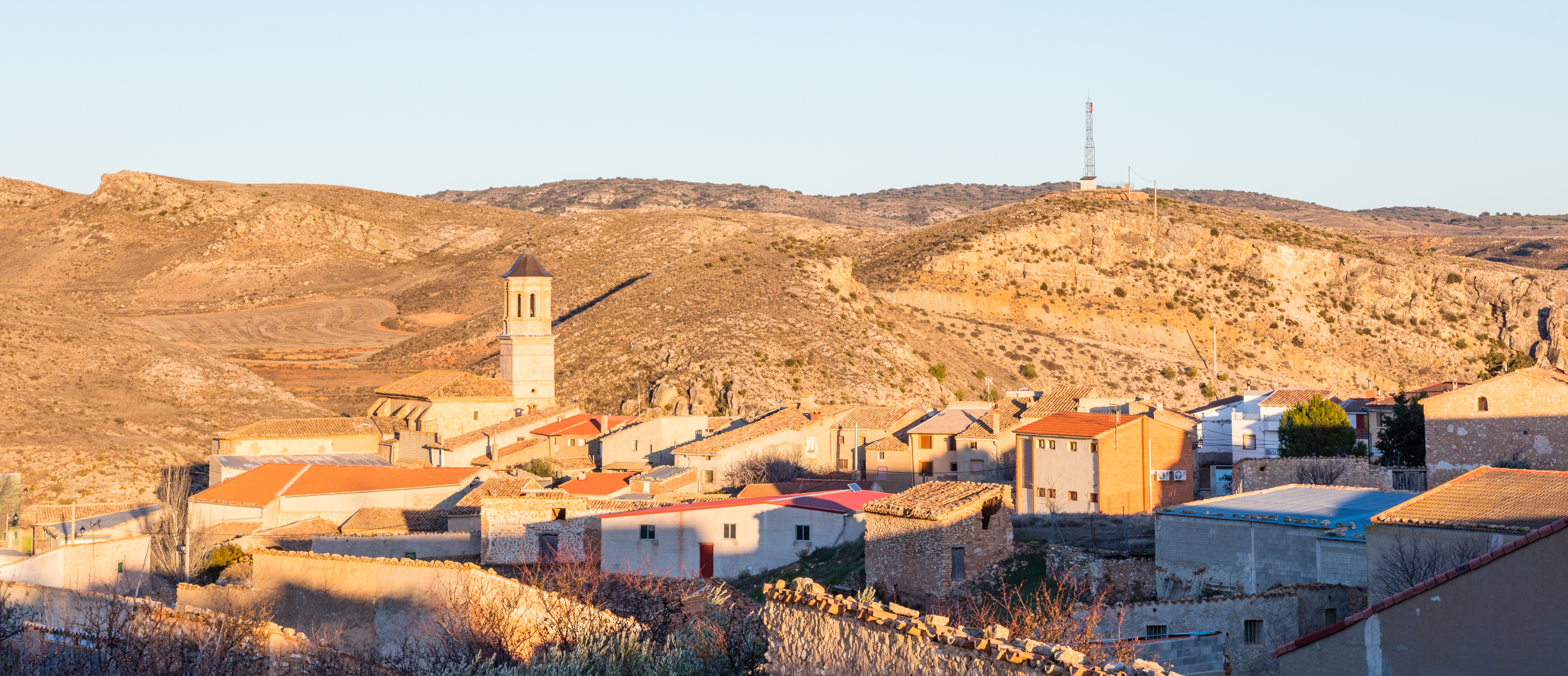

- Flag Coat of arms

- Location in Spain.
- Coordinates: 41°07′53″N 0°50′00″W
- Country: Spain
- Autonomous community: Aragon
- Province: Zaragoza
- Comarca: Campo de Belchite

Government
  - Mayor: Luis Martín Mareca

Area
  - Total: 61 km^{2} (24 sq mi)
- Elevation: 659 m (2,162 ft)

Population (2025-01-01)
  - Total: 107
  - Density: 1.8/km^{2} (4.5/sq mi)
- Time zone: UTC+1 (CET)
  - Summer (DST): UTC+2 (CEST)
- Postal code: 50144

Moneva is a municipality located in the province of Zaragoza, Aragon, Spain. According to the 2004 census (INE), the municipality has a population of 123 inhabitants.

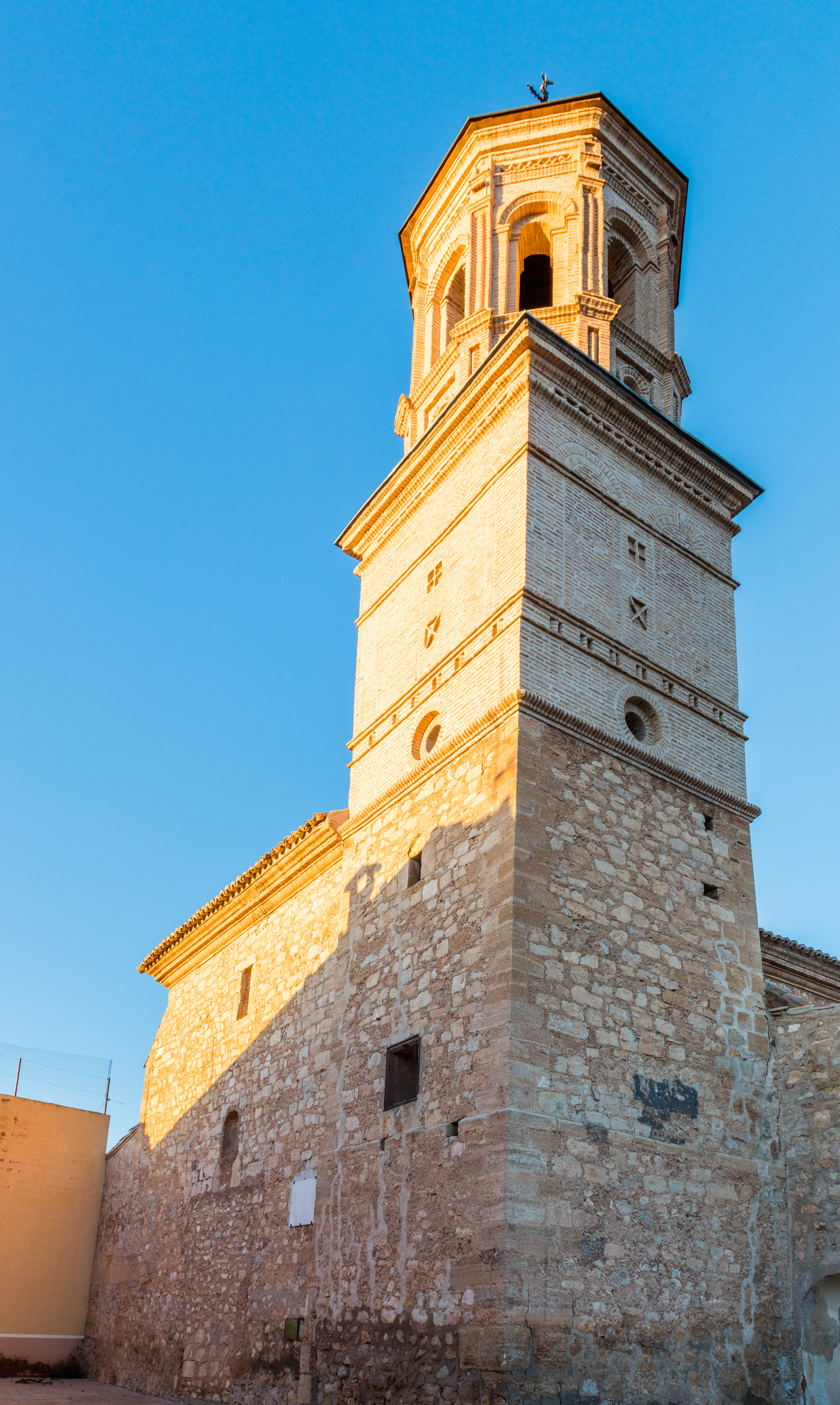
Church of St Eulalia in Moneva

== See also ==
- List of municipalities in Zaragoza
