= Etelvino Vega =

Spanish army officer (1906–1939)

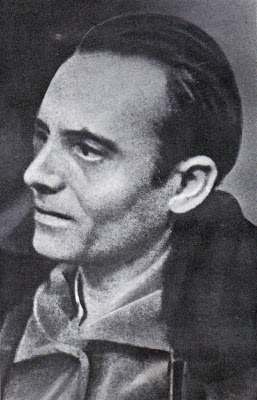
- Born: Etelvino Vega Martínez; 1906; Mieres, Asturias, Kingdom of Spain
- Died: 15 November 1939 (aged 32–33); Alicante, Spanish State
- Military career
- Allegiance: (Second Spanish Republic) Spanish Republic
- Branch: Spanish Republican Army
- Service years: 1936–1939
- Rank: Lieutenant Colonel
- Commands: 34th Division, 12th Army Corps (1938-9).
- Conflicts: Spanish Civil War: Battle of Guadalajara; Battle of Teruel; Battle of the Ebro; Final offensive of the Spanish Civil War

Etelvino Vega Martínez (1906–1939) was a Spanish politician and military officer.

== Life ==
In 1931, he was a member of the central committee of the Communist Party of Spain (PCE). However in 1932, after the failed coup attempt by Sanjurjo, he broke with the Comintern's directives and supported the government of the Second Spanish Republic famously coining the slogan “Defence of the Republic". As a result, he and other central committee members were expelled from the party. He subsequently spent time in the Soviet Union before returning to Spain.

After the outbreak of the Spanish Civil War, he fought with the Fifth Regiment on the Somosierra front and later with the Popular Army in the Battle of Guadalajara. He subsequently led the 34th division of Heredia’s 18th Army Corps in the Battle of Teruel and later commanded the 12th Army Corps in the Battle of Ebro. In March 1939, he was appointed military commander of Alicante, but during Casado’s coup on 6 March, he was arrested by the supporters of Casado. After the end of the war, he was captured by the Nationalists at the Port of Alicante, then he was confined in Los Almendros concentration camp and Albatera concentration camp, and finally executed in November 1939. He left his handkerchief to one of his cellmates, asking him a last favour: "It's all I have, you give it to my wife."
