= 24th Division (Spain) =

- 24.ª División
- Active: 3 April 1937–17 January 1939
- Country: Spanish Republic
- Allegiance: (Second Spanish Republic) Republican faction
- Branch: Spanish Republican Army
- Type: Infantry
- Size: Division
- Engagements: Spanish Civil War: Battle of Brunete; Battle of Albarracín; Battle of Belchite; Battle of Teruel; Battle of the Segre; Battle of the Ebro

Commanders
- Notable commanders: Miguel Gallo Martínez; Miguel Yoldi; Miguel García Vivancos

The 24th Division was one of the divisions of the Spanish Republican Army that were organized during the Spanish Civil War on the basis of mixed brigades. Throughout the war, the unit was deployed on the Andalusian, Madrid, Aragon and Segre fronts, taking part in some of the main battles.

== History ==
It was created on 3 April 1937, as a reserve of the Southern Army. During the previous weeks the division had been organizing in Alcaracejos, around the 25th Mixed Brigade. In June it joined the 9th Army Corps.

The command of the unit was assumed by Miguel Gallo Martínez, former head of the 6th Mixed Brigade. The 24th Division subsequently moved to the Central front and took part in the Battle of Brunete, attacking south of Madrid. Shortly after, it was urgently sent to the Teruel front, where it participated in the arrest of the Francoist counteroffensive on the Albarracín sector, (Note: At the beginning of July the Republican 42nd Division had launched an offensive against Albarracín.) In July 1937, it also took part in the second phase of the Battle of Belchite. On 15 November 1937, Gallo took command of the 10th Army Corps, and was replaced as division commander by Miguel Yoldi Beroiz. By then the unit had its headquarters in Lagata. During the following months the 24th Division remained at the Aragon front, without intervening in relevant military operations.

In March 1938, when the Aragon Offensive took place, the division was unable to withstand the impact of the nationalist attack and undertook a disorganized retreat, during which it apparently ran out of ammunition. The division was disbanded on 12 March, although it was recreated again on 19 March with the 19th, 104th and 143rd mixed brigades. The command was handed over to Antonio Ortiz Ramírez, former commander of the 25th Division and an anarchist. After the end of the nationalist offensives, the 24th Division established its defensive positions around the Segre River. Its headquarters were established in Artesa de Segre.

At the beginning of July 1938, Ortiz left the command of the unit, fleeing to France; This prompted his replacement with Miguel García Vivancos, who was given the order to capture and shoot him. During the rest of the year the 24th Division did not intervene in relevant operations. At the end of 1938 it was under the command of Hermenegildo Roca Oliver. As part of the 24th Army Corps, it was deployed on the Ebro front.

It took part in the first phase of the Catalonia Offensive, without much success. On 17 January 1939, the unit, strongly broken and disorganized, ended up being dissolved. The remains of the unit were used to reinforce the 43rd Division, while Major Roca Oliver assumed command of the unmade 56th Division.

== Command ==
Commanders

- Miguel Gallo Martínez (from April 1937);
- Miguel Yoldi Beroiz (from December 1937);
- Antonio Ortiz Ramírez (from March 1938);
- Miguel García Vivancos (from July 1938);
- Hermenegildo Roca Oliver (from November 1938);

Commissars

- José Gallardo Moreno, of the PCE;
- Francisco Señer Martín, of the CNT;

Chiefs of staff

- José Guarner Vivancos (from July 1937);

Date	Attached Army Corps	Integrated mixed brigades	Battlefront
April 1937	Southern Army	25th, 52nd and 86th	Andalusia
July 1937	2nd Army Corps	6th, 7th and 19th	Madrid
14 July 1937	2nd Army Corps	6th, 16th and 21st	Brunete
August 1937	5th Army Corps	6th, 21st and 97th	Belchite
December 1937	12th Army Corps	6th and 153rd	Teruel
March 1938	12th Army Corps	6th, 140th and 153rd	Aragon
March–April 1938	10th Army Corps	19th, 104th and 143rd	Segre
December 1938	24th Army Corps	19th, 133rd and 143rd	Ebro

== Bibliography ==
- Alpert, Michael (1989). El ejército republicano en la guerra civil (in Spanish). Siglo XXI Editores.
- Álvarez Gómez, Santiago (1989). Los comisarios políticos en el Ejército Popular de la República (in Spanish). Ediciós do Castro.
- Álvarez Rey, Leandro [in Spanish]; Lemus López, Encarnación (1998). Historia de Andalucía Contemporánea (in Spanish). Universidad de Huelva.
- Engel, Carlos (1999). Historia de las Brigadas Mixtas del Ejército Popular de la República (in Spanish). Madrid: Almena. ISBN 84-922644-7-0.
- Maldonado, José M.ª (2007). El frente de Aragón. La Guerra Civil en Aragón (1936–1938) (in Spanish). Mira Editores. ISBN 978-84-8465-237-3.
- Márquez, José Manuel; Gallardo, Juan José (1999). Ortiz: general sin Dios ni amo (in Spanish). Hacer Editorial.
- Martínez Bande, José Manuel [in Spanish] (1979). La Campaña de Cataluña (in Spanish). Madrid: San Martín.
- Martínez Bande, José Manuel (1981). La batalla de Pozoblanco y el cierre de la bolsa de Mérida (in Spanish). Madrid: Editorial San Martín.
- Salas Larrazábal, Ramón (2006). Historia del Ejército Popular de la República (in Spanish). Madrid: La Esfera de los libros. ISBN 84-9734-465-0.
- Thomas, Hugh (1977). The Spanish Civil War (3 ed.). San Francisco: Harper & Row. ISBN 0060142782.
- Zaragoza, Cristóbal (1983). Ejército Popular y Militares de la República, 1936-1939 (in Spanish). Barcelona: Ed. Planeta.
