= Aragonese people =

Aragonese
- Location of Aragon in Spain

Total population
- about 1 million

Regions with significant populations
- Aragon, Spain

Languages
- Majority: Spanish; Minority: Aragonese, Catalan

Religion
- Predominantly Roman Catholicism

Related ethnic groups
- other Spaniards, including peoples from the old Crown of Aragon (Catalans, Valencians) and other neighboring areas (Navarre, La Rioja, provinces of Soria and Guadalajara)

The Aragonese (Aragonese and Spanish: aragoneses, Catalan: aragonesos) are the Romance people self-identified with the historical region of Aragon, in inland northeastern Spain. Their Aragonese language, which might have been spoken in the whole of the Kingdom of Aragon, Kingdom of Navarre and La Rioja in the Middle Ages, is as of 2011 a seriously endangered language, natively spoken only by around 25,000 people in the northern mountain area of the autonomous community of Aragon. In 2009, the Aragonese language was recognized by the regional government as the "native language, original and historic" of Aragon, and it received several linguistic rights, such as use in public administration. This legislation was repealed by a new law in 2013 (Law 3/2013).

Most Aragonese (90% or more) speak the Spanish language, traditionally in a northern variety with some regional traits, particularly in intonation and vocabulary. The use of the native Aragonese language is now confined to a minority, mostly in rural and mountainous regions of northern Aragon. In the easternmost areas, La Franja, varieties of the Catalan language are spoken by about 90% of the population.

== See also ==
- List of Aragonese
- Aragon
- Kingdom of Aragon
- Crown of Aragon
- Nationalities of Spain
