= Red and Black Column =

Anarchist militia column during the Spanish Civil War

- Columna Roja y Negra
- Active: August 1936–May 1937
- Country: Spain
- Allegiance: Confederación Nacional del Trabajo
- Branch: Confederal militias
- Type: Militia column
- Size: 1,500
- Garrison/HQ: Azuara
- Colours: Red; Black
- Engagements: Spanish Civil War: Battle of Mallorca; Aragon front; May Days

Commanders
- Commander: José García Pradas
- Military advisor: Luis Jiménez Pajarero
- Political officer: Juan Yagüe

The Red and Black Column (Spanish: Columna Roja y Negra) was a column of the confederal militias that fought in the Spanish Civil War. It was initially established to participate in the Mallorca landings, but after the expedition was defeated, it became the fifth anarchist militia to be dispatched to the Aragon front. The column's position on the front was adjacent to the militia of the Workers' Party of Marxist Unification (POUM), but the two refused to collaborate with each other. The column participated in the establishment of the Regional Defence Council of Aragon and later merged into the Ascaso Column. In early 1937, it was militarised and transformed into the 127th Mixed Brigade of the Popular Army of the Republic. During the May Days, members of the former Red and Black Column attempted to abandon the front and go to Barcelona, but they were turned back after intervention from anarchist officials and the Republican military.

== Formation ==
In the lead up to the July 1936 military uprising in Barcelona, on 17 July, the anarchist defence committee members Juan Yagüe and Julián Merino raided the ships in the port of Barcelona and seized the weapons on board. After the uprising was defeated in Barcelona, the Catalan revolutionaries organised a number of militia columns to fight against the Nationalists in Aragon. The first two columns, the Durruti Column and South Ebro Column, were sent by the anarchists. They were followed soon after by the anarchist Ascaso Column, then by the Del Barrio Column of the Unified Socialist Party of Catalonia (PSUC) and the Rovira-Arquer Column of Workers' Party of Marxist Unification (POUM). In August, the anarchists sent their fourth column, the Aguiluchos Column.

During this time, Juan Yagüe put together the Red and Black Column (Spanish: Columna Roja y Negra) for the Battle of Mallorca, but the expedition to take the island was ultimately unsuccessful. Antònia Fontanillas Borràs had convinced Yagüe to allow her to join the column and participate in the Mallorca landings, but her father made her stay behind. Two of her friends joined the Mallorca expedition and one went on to fight on the Aragon front. In mid-September, the Red and Black Column was sent to the Aragon front as the anarchists' fifth militia column. The column was commanded by the syndicalist José García Pradas, with Luis Jiménez Pajarero as the column's military advisor. The Column was politically led by Juan Yagüe, who died on the front lines later that month.

== Aragon front ==
The Red and Black Column established its barracks in Azuara, approximately six kilometres behind the front line. There they established a local union of the Confederación Nacional del Trabajo (CNT) and a group of the Libertarian Youth, which fielded many of the militia's members. Members of the Red and Black Column attended town meetings, and according to Augustin Souchy, maintained a "cordial relationship" with the town's inhabitants. Near the front line in Angüés, the Red and Black Column and the militia of the Workers' Party of Marxist Unification (POUM) occupied opposite sides of the village. When one went into combat, the other stayed behind, rather than the two fighting together.

On 6 October 1936, the Red and Black Column participated in the establishment of the Regional Defence Council of Aragon. The Red and Black Column and Aguiluchos Column eventually merged into the Ascaso Column, which came to count 7,000 militiamen under the command of Domingo Ascaso and Gregorio Jover. In early 1937, the Red and Black Column was militarised into the 127th Mixed Brigade, which was integrated into the 28th Division of the Popular Army of the Republic.

== May Days ==
Following the outbreak of the May Days, on 5 May 1937, between 1,500 and 2,000 militiamen of the former Red and Black Column and the POUM abandoned the front line in Huesca and attempted to go to Barcelona. They left some of their forces distributed along the front, in order to assure its defence against the Nationalists. Juan Manuel Molina was alerted to the movements when the 127th Mixed Brigade, led by Máximo Franco, passed through Monzón carrying artillery cannons and machine guns. On their way, they were intercepted by the Spanish Republican Air Force and detained in Lleida. Franco then met with CNT members from Binéfar and was put on the phone to Molina, who assured him that the anarchists had enough forces in Barcelona to beat the communists. The meeting with the CNT officials convinced most of the Red and Black columnists to return to the front. 40 members of the column continued on to Barcelona, where they captured the Ronda de Sant Pau. But following appeals from the leadership of the CNT, they eventually abandoned the barricades.

== Bibliography ==
- Alba, Victor; Schwartz, Stephen (1988). "Defamation". Spanish Marxism versus Soviet Communism: A History of the P.O.U.M. Transaction Publishers. pp. 171–209. doi:10.4324/9781315130118-7. ISBN 0-88738-198-7.
- Alexander, Robert J. (1999). The Anarchists in the Spanish Civil War. Janus Publishing Company. ISBN 978-1-85756-400-6.
- Alpert, Michael (2013). The Republican Army in the Spanish Civil War, 1936–1939. Cambridge University Press. ISBN 978-1-107-02873-9.
- Beevor, Antony (2006). The Battle for Spain: The Spanish Civil War, 1936-1939. Weidenfeld & Nicolson. ISBN 978-0-14-303765-1.
- Casanova, Julián (2005). Preston, Paul (ed.). Anarchism, the Republic and Civil War in Spain: 1931–1939. Translated by Dowling, Andrew; Pollok, Graham. Routledge. ISBN 0-415-32095-X.
- Evans, Danny (2018). Revolution and the State: Anarchism in the Spanish Civil War, 1936–1939. Routledge. ISBN 978-1-138-06314-3.
- Fraser, Ronald (1979). Blood of Spain: The Experience of Civil War, 1936-1939. Penguin Books. ISBN 0-7139-1085-2.
- Guillamón, Agustín (2013) [2010]. "From Defense Cadres to Popular Militias". Libcom.org. Translated by Reclus, Alias.
- Pagès i Blanch, Pelai (2013) [2007]. War and Revolution in Catalonia, 1936–1939. Translated by Gallagher, Patrick. Brill. ISBN 978-90-04-25426-8.
- Paz, Abel (2006) [1996]. Durruti in the Spanish Revolution. Translated by Morse, Chuck. Edinburgh: AK Press. ISBN 1-904859-50-X. LCCN 2006920974. OCLC 482919277.
- Paz, Abel (2011). The Story of the Iron Column: Militant Anarchism in the Spanish Civil War. AK Press. ISBN 978-1-84935-064-8.
- Souchy, Augustin (2017) [1937]. "Azuara". With the Peasants of Aragon. Translated by Bluestein, Abe. Theory and Practice. pp. 56–58. ISBN 978-0-9956609-0-8.
