= Nosotros (group) =

Spanish anarchist group

Us
- Nosotros
- Leaders: Buenaventura Durruti; Francisco Ascaso; Joan Garcia Oliver
- Dates active: May 1931–July 1936
- Country: Spain
- Headquarters: Barcelona
- Ideology: Anarchism; Libertarian communism
- Political position: Far-left
- Part of: Iberian Anarchist Federation

Nosotros (English: Us) was a Spanish anarchist militant group during the period of the Second Spanish Republic in the 1930s. The group was a reorganisation of Los Solidarios, a militant group that had resisted the dictatorship of Primo de Rivera. After the proclamation of the Republic, Nosotros quickly came into conflict with the new government of Spain and provoked a number of insurrections during the early 1930s. Group members were deported following the Alt Llobregat insurrection of January 1932. The group, led by Joan Garcia Oliver, then incited the anarchist insurrection of January 1933. Following the 1933 Spanish general election, the group split over whether to carry out another insurrection, with Garcia Oliver calling for a focus on organisation, while Buenaventura Durruti went to Zaragoza to lead the anarchist insurrection of December 1933.

Many of the group's members were arrested during the Revolution of 1934, but managed to reorganise. They then shifted away from insurrectionary anarchism and began advocating for anarchists to organise, as they believed a civil war was imminent. During the July 1936 military uprising in Barcelona, Nosotros led the anarchist resistance to the coup, culminating in the Spanish Revolution of 1936. Group members then oversaw the organisation of the confederal militias, which participated in the war effort against the Spanish Nationalists.

== Establishment ==
Under the dictatorship of Primo de Rivera, political repression had forced activists of the anarchist group Los Solidarios to disperse. Some of the group's members, such as Joan Garcia Oliver, were imprisoned by the regime; others, including Francisco Ascaso, Buenaventura Durruti, Miguel García Vivancos and Gregorio Jover, fled into exile in Europe and Latin America. Ascaso and Durruti were among the first exiled anarchists to arrive in Barcelona after the proclamation of the Second Spanish Republic. When Ricardo Sanz informed Ascaso and Durruti about the regime change, they regretted the CNT's decision, believing Companys to be an agent of counterrevolution. They called for the CNT to return to its anarchist roots, respond to the prevailing socio-political problems in the country and refrain from stabilising the new government. Ascaso and Durruti believed that the new republican government would not bring any radical reforms and would instead allow the existing socio-economic conditions to persist. They concluded that popular support for the government would decline and that anarchists should be there to channel popular discontent into social revolution. Their position was criticised by other members of the CNT, who denounced them as "anarcho-Bolsheviks", as well as Marxists, who disregarded them as "infantile revolutionaries".

The regime change created problems for the CNT and the Iberian Anarchist Federation (FAI), as many of their militants remained in prisons throughout the country, due to the dictatorship having categorised them as common criminals rather than political prisoners. When the provisional government said it would review the encarcerations on a case-by-case basis, Solidaridad Obrera denounced the decision and demanded the immediate release of all anarchist prisoners. Los Solidarios took up the call, as many of their own members were still dispersed between various different prisons: Esteban Euterio Salamero, Juliana López and Rafael Torres Escartín were in El Dueso prison; Aurelio Fernández was in Cartagena; and Joan Garcia Oliver was in Burgos.

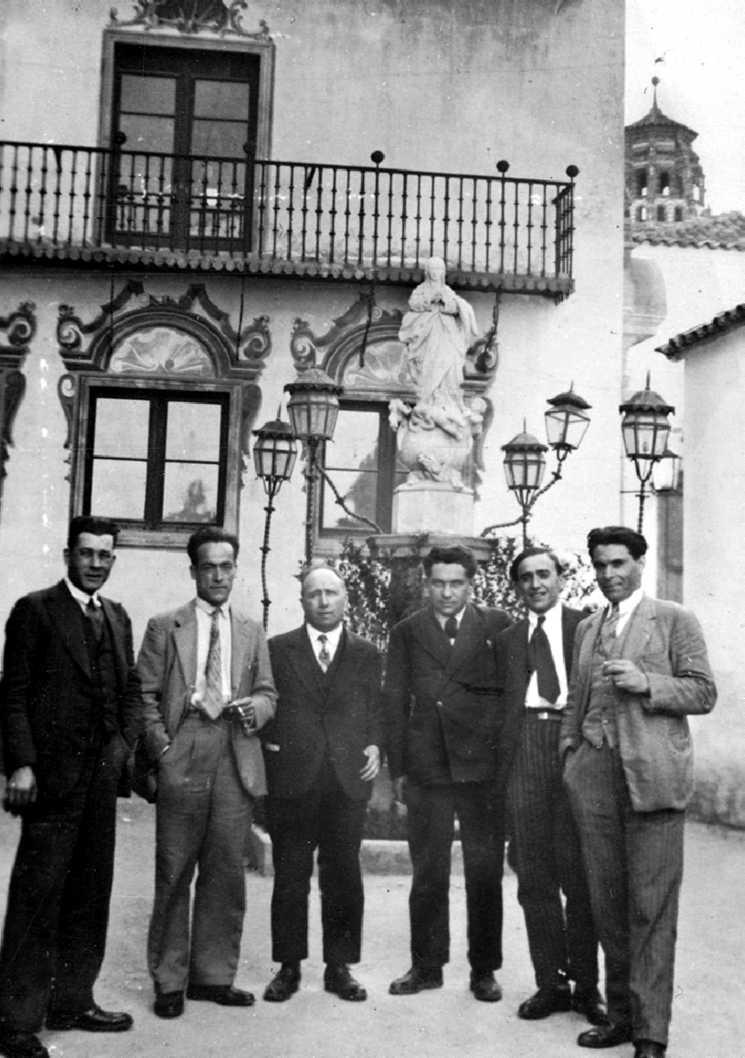
Los Solidarios members at the Poble Espanyol on 1 May 1936

At a meeting of the CNT at Montjuïc, on 18 April, members of Los Solidarios spoke about the new Republic and their view that radical social and political reforms were needed. García Oliver, who had been released from Burgos prison and returned to Barcelona, made passionate invocations for revolution. Ascaso and Durruti gave similar well-received speeches, with the latter warning that Spain would head towards civil war if the government did not meet the demands of the working classes. As the CNT began to prepare for the celebration of International Workers' Day, Ascaso and Durruti were delegated to accompany foreign anarchists that were coming to the event: Marcel Dieu from Belgium; Louis Lecoin and Pierre Odéon from France; Helmut Rüdiger and Augustin Souchy from Germany; Camillo Berneri from Italy; Albert de Jong from the Netherlands; and Ida Mett and Volin from Russia. After the demonstration arrived at the Plaça Sant Jaume and a delegation attempted to enter the Palace of the Generalitat of Catalonia, the Civil Guard began to shoot at the demonstrators. Durruti briefly managed to restore calm, but before long, a battle had broken out between the police and demonstrators. Soldiers were eventually brought in to stop the violence, and together with the demonstrators, they forced the police to withdraw.

In response to the repression of the International Workers' Day demonstration, the CNT and FAI called meetings to decide how to respond. The Catalan President Francesc Macià himself attempted to offer a truce, hoping the CNT would support him in the upcoming referendum on the Catalan Statute of Autonomy. Some members of the CNT supported a deal with the Catalan government, but others opposed it, worrying that it would lead to further political repression against the anarchist movement. Signs of a split showed at the CNT's meeting on the issue, which ultimately resolved to refer the issue to a National Congress of the CNT, which they hoped could provide a coherent response to the new political conditions. Thirty Catalan anarchist groups also held a joint meeting, where many of the old guard of the anarchist movement met new activists who had joined up during the years of the dictatorship. At the meeting, Los Solidarios discovered that one of the recently formed youth groups had taken the same name. Not wanting to press the issue, the ex-Solidarios renamed themselves to Nosotros (English: Us).

== Social conflict ==
Nosotros thought that the new Spanish Republic was being "held hostage" by men who had been part of the ruling class under the Kingdom of Spain, including conservative politicians such as Prime Minister Niceto Alcalá-Zamora and Interior Minister Miguel Maura, and reactionary military officers such as Gonzalo Queipo de Llano of the Carabineros and José Sanjurjo of the Civil Guard. They considered social and political reform to be impossible under these men. Nosotros believed that, as neither the state nor the capitalist class would be willing to institute the labour reforms proposed by Labour Minister Francisco Largo Caballero, the working class would be radicalised towards class conflict and eventually lead to political repression. They thus argued for revolutionaries of the CNT to prevent the new state from strengthening itself by practising "revolutionary gymnastics", through which workers would be exposed to revolutionary theory in practice and begin to work towards changing society. Moderate members of the CNT considered their analysis of social conditions in Spain to be overly simplistic and labelled the Nosotros group as Blanquists.

Class conflict soon broke out, with peasants throughout the province of Córdoba carrying out attacks against haciendas and looting the premises, which local socialist mayors divided between their citizens. Miguel Maura dispatched the Civil Guard to the area and begged Largo Caballero to rein in his radical colleagues, but attacks against haciendas only increased. Maura reacted by imprisoning socialist mayors and militant activists, replacing the local governments with committees of large landowners and caciques, and placing the province under Civil Guard occupation. Peasant revolts continued throughout Andalusia and New Castile, but they never escalated from rebellion to revolution, as the peasants were largely driven by desperation rather than conscious action and ideals. Nosotros dedicated itself to provoking insurrections, in which workers would bring the means of production under collective ownership and establish libertarian communism. They brought this proposal up at meetings of the FAI, which broadly accepted it, with Isaac Puente drawing up a programme for libertarian communism.

By this time, members of Nosotros were active in labour struggles throughout Spain; they attended meetings, organised militant groups and acquired weapons for future outbreaks of social conflict. Francisco Ascaso and Ricardo Sanz attended a number of CNT rallies in the Basque Country, including one organised in Bilbao by the Asturian miner José María Martínez. They then went to the Garate, Anitua y Compañía factory in Eibar, where they discussed the delivery of 1,000 rifles purchased by Los Solidarios years earlier. The manufacturers responded that the delivery required authorisation from the governor Ramón María Aldasoro, who in turn said that he required authorisation from Interior Minister Maura. When Ascaso went to Madrid and asked Maura to authorise the shipment of the rifles to the CNT, he rejected the request and instead authorised the shipment of the rifles to the Catalan government. Nosotros reluctantly accepted the cession of their weapons to the Generalitat, which used them to arm the Escamots militia.

In Barcelona, the new civil governor Josep Oriol Anguera de Sojo and police chief Arturo Menéndez López had begun to carry out political repression against the CNT. Activists were imprisoned, unions shut down and workers' meetings broken up. The majority of the members of Nosotros were blacklisted from their trades, requiring them to find jobs through the CNT, which had obliged owners in Barcelona's manufacturing and textiles industries to hire only unionised workers. In August 1931, some workers called a general strike to demand the release of political prisoners, but the call was not supported by the moderate leaders of the CNT, leading to its collapse. Workers in some sectors, including 20,000 metalworkers and 42,000 construction workers, continued the strike. Catalan business owners responded by closing factories and firing striking workers. The FAI attempted to channel the discontent into a coherent force, establishing an Economic Defense Commission, which organised a rent strike and mobilised large popular assemblies. On 2 August, a mass meeting was held at the Palau de les Belles Arts, where the FAI activists Buenaventura Durruti, Joan Garcia Oliver, Tomás Cano Ruiz, Vicente Corbi and Arturo Perera gave speeches. Construction workers continued to strike, even as metalworkers returned to work. On 4 September, Anguera de Sojo ordered the seizure of the Construction Workers' Union offices on Carrer dels Mercaders. When the Assault Guards approached the building, union activists shot at them, leading to a shootout. After several hours, the trade unionists ran out of ammunition and surrendered; 94 trade unionists, including Mariano R. Vázquez, were arrested and imprisoned on a former slave ship. The Assault Guards brought a dozen of the arrested workers to their headquarters, ostensibly for questioning, and shot them.

== Split in the CNT-FAI ==
Following the 1931 Congress of the CNT, internal divisions within the CNT crystallised into two main factions: the treintistas, who supported a reformist form of syndicalism; and the faistas (members of the FAI), which encompassed the broad spectrum of anarchism. The FAI itself was also divided into three main tendencies, based on generational, geographical and ideological divides: the anarcho-syndicalist faction, which consisted mostly of older activists from Madrid and Asturias, favoured building the organisational capacity of the CNT before carrying out a revolution against the state; the revolutionary faction, consisting largely of groups from Catalonia such as Nosotros, which called for immediate revolutionary action; and the intellectual faction, led by Diego Abad de Santillán, which was fixated on economic planning. Informed by their own experiences and practices, the revolutionaries of Nosotros upheld the self-organisation of the working class and rejected the guidance of the working class by political theorists and thought leaders. Nosotros member Francisco Ascaso believed that the best way for workers to educate themselves on anarchism was through experience, rather than reading political theory. Ascaso firmly rejected doctrine, believing it could deter workers from taking direct action against capitalism: "Our people stand for action on the march. It is while going forward that they overtake. Don't hold them back, even to teach them 'the most beautiful theories'".

In late August 1931, thirty moderate members of the CNT leadership, including Joan Peiró and Ángel Pestaña, published the "Manifesto of the Thirty". They argued for revolutionary initiatives to be temporarily pacified, so that workers could attract intellectuals and technicians into the CNT, which could then plan a new economy that could replace the existing capitalist economy. They also implicitly criticised the revolutionary members of the FAI for "Blanquism" and accused them of attempting to Bolshevise the CNT through dictatorial methods. In an attempt to further divide the CNT, right-wing newspapers began to attack the FAI, which they claimed was led by the "three bandits" Ascaso, Durruti and García Oliver. As the National Committee of the CNT began to restrain the independent initiative of its membership, Solidaridad Obrera defended the thirty as "sensible men". In El Luchador, Federica Montseny defended the FAI and criticised the CNT leadership for attempting to make the organisation an affiliate of the Catalan government and the Republican Left of Catalonia (ERC). In interviews with Eduardo de Guzmán, Durruti and García Oliver rejected the manifesto and called for workers of the CNT to carry out a social revolution against the government of Spain.

Antagonism between the two factions of the CNT came to a head at a meeting of the Barcelona Local Federation on 30 September, during a discussion on the establishment of Industrial Federations. Moderates accused the FAI of trying to assume dictatorial control of the CNT, while the radicals rejected the bureaucratisation of the CNT and attempts to integrate it into the state. Although the meeting voted in favour of instituting industrial federations, it also selected the faistas Francisco Ascaso and José Canela as its representatives to the upcoming regional meeting of the Catalan CNT, provoking Joan Peiró to resign as editor of Solidaridad Obrera. On 11 October, after 16 hours of debate, the Catalan Regional Federation decided to accept the establishment of the industrial federations, on the condition that regional confederations and individual unions reserved the right to apply or not apply the decision. In a further defeat for the moderate faction, the meeting elected the extremist Felipe Alaiz as the new editor of Solidaridad Obrera.

As news of Alaiz's election spread, Spanish newspapers began attempting to turn public opinion against the FAI. The right-wing press branded Ascaso, Durruti and García Oliver as "public enemies", while the Catalan nationalist press labelled them as "Murcians". After Ascaso was arrested, Catalan anarchists immediately organised a campaign for his release. By December 1931, Ascaso had been released from prison. Soon after, Durruti was arrested in Girona and León, respectively on charges of attempting to assassinate King Alfonso XIII in 1926 and robbing a bank in Xixón in 1923.

== Insurrection ==
=== January 1932 ===
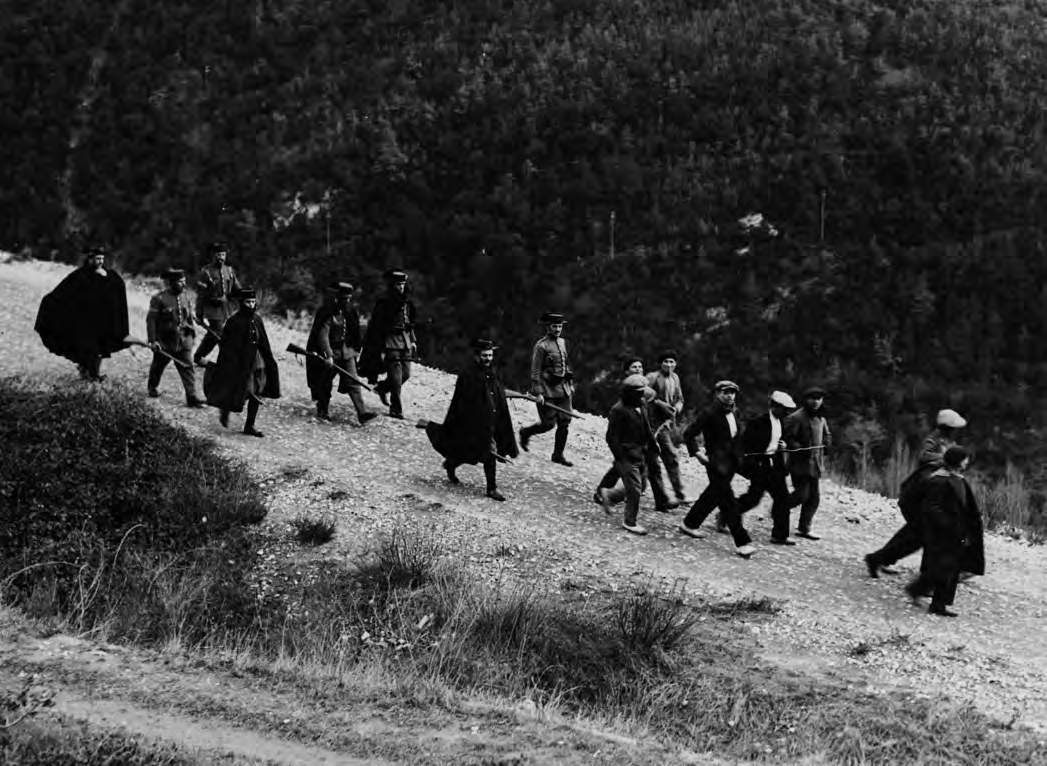
Miners under arrest, following the Alt Llobregat insurrection

In January 1932, members of Nosotros organised the Alt Llobregat insurrection, during which anarchist miners and textile workers proclaimed libertarian communism throughout central Catalonia. After the uprising was suppressed, 110 activists of the CNT were arrested and deported. Among the deportees were members of Nosotros, including Buenaventura Durruti, Francisco and Domingo Ascaso, and Gregorio Jover. Although the insurrection had collapsed, it convinced many within the FAI that revolution was a real possibility. On the other hand, the treintistas condemned the uprising and many of the faction's leading members were subsequently removed from office within the CNT. When moderate members of the CNT broke away from the organisation to form their own trade union centre, the FAI published a statement denouncing the split. Nosotros member García Oliver oversaw the writing of the document, which called on workers to choose between the "extremist" and "moderate" factions.

=== January 1933 ===
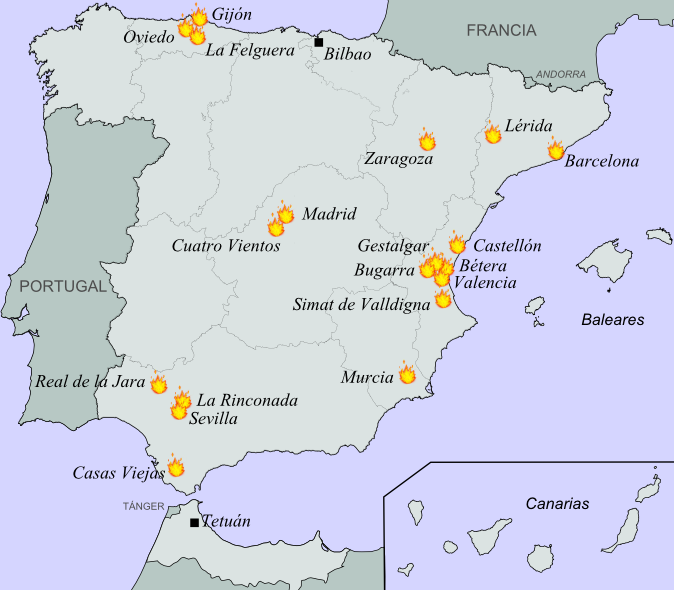
Map of the anarchist insurrection of January 1933

In December 1932, after the group's deported members had returned from exile, García Oliver called a meeting at his house. Among the attendees were Domingo and Francisco Ascaso, Buenaventura Durruti, Aurelio Fernández, Miguel García Vivancos, Gregorio Jover, Juliana López, Pepita Not, Antonio Ortiz, Ricardo Sanz and María Luisa Tejedor. García Oliver informed them that the Catalan Regional Committee of the CNT had entrusted him with devising a plan for an insurrection. The group lamented that the CNT had wasted time with internal debates, while the state had strengthened itself. They believed that it would have been easy to carry out a social revolution during the first year of the republic, when the Assault Guard did not yet exist, the Spanish Republican Army still lacked discipline and the Civil Guard was hated by much of the public. Seeking to prevent the further consolidation of the government's forces and inspired by the Alt Llobregat insurrection, the group resolved to bring about a revolutionary situation.

In mid-December 1932, García Oliver met with the Catalan Regional Committee and explained his plan to them. The committee was divided on the issue, with some arguing that the CNT ought to first focus on its internal issues with the treintistas before going on the offensive, while others considered making a move against the Spanish and Catalan governments to be an urgent matter. Despite the disagreements, the Committee adopted the plan and established a Revolutionary Committee, headed by Nosotros members Garcia Oliver, Ascaso and Durruti. They excluded moderate members of the CNT and FAI from the committee, consolidating their control over the organisation. Nosotros called for an immediate confrontation with the Catalan government under Macià, believing the conditions were right for an insurrection, due to the rising backlash against reforms such as the establishment of works councils by Santiago Casares Quiroga.

Together they planned to besiege police and army barracks throughout Barcelona, while guerrilla groups in the city centre captured government and civil infrastructure buildings. On 8 January 1933, while bombs were being placed beneath the Police Prefecture and the Civil Government building, García Oliver and Gregorio Jover were arrested, effectively neutralising the insurrection before it had broken out. Durruti attempted to assault the barracks in Gràcia, but found that the police there were already mobilised. As the insurrection was defeated in the early hours of 9 January, many of the insurgents fled into hiding, while Garcia Oliver was tortured for having instigated the uprising. In response to vocal public criticisms of their actions, Ascaso, Durruti and García Oliver defended the insurrection, which they believed would eventually lead to the fall of the Republican government.

While Garcia Oliver remained in La Model prison, in early April 1933, Ascaso and Durruti were arrested in Seville. They were kept in El Puerto de Santa María for six months, until October 1933, when they were released after carrying out a hunger strike. Josep Peirats, the general secretary of the Barcelona section of the FAI, later called a secret meeting with Nosotros on Turó de la Rovira. There he met with Joan Garcia Oliver and Aurelio Fernández, who he asked to explain their conduct during the insurrection. Garcia Oliver and Fernández claimed that they were not members of the FAI, which Peirats later confirmed in a letter to Frank Mintz.

=== December 1933 ===
In response to the perceived inevitability of a right-wing victory in the 1933 Spanish general election, the CNT resolved to carry out another insurrection against the forthcoming government. When Nosotros met to discuss the proposed insurrection, they disagreed on how to respond. Drawing from his experience in the January insurrection, Joan Garcia Oliver believed that they should establish a coordinated revolutionary paramilitary, but as they had limited time and resources, he concluded that the conditions were not yet right for insurrection. He also called for closer cooperation with the Spanish Socialist Workers' Party (PSOE). His view was shared by most of the group, except Francisco Ascaso and Buenaventura Durruti, who believed they were compelled to confront the situation. Durruti claimed that a defeat would be better than inactivity or absence from political life during an election, as even in defeat, they would have warned the incoming government about the revolutionary potential of the working class. Durruti also believed that the continued influence of moderates in the PSOE, such as Indalecio Prieto, would prevent any alliance with the anarchists. He claimed that high rates of abstention in the elections justified a rebellion against the election results. Durruti broke from the rest of Nosotros and went to Zaragoza, where he led the anarchist insurrection of December 1933.

In the wake of the insurrection, in early 1934, moderate intellectuals led by Diego Abad de Santillán took control of the Peninsular Committee of the FAI. The new leaders of the FAI soon moved against the Nosotros group, which it considered to have held a disproportionate influence over the organisation. The A group of the Barcelona federation called for greater internal democracy within the organisation, which would allow minorities to dissent and propose changes to the organisation. Towards the end of 1934, the A group attempted to expel the Nosotros group from the FAI. Members such as Abelardo Iglesias, Ricard Mestre and Jacinto Toryho believed that the revolutionary tactics advocated by the Nosotros group aligned closer with Bolshevism than anarchism, and proposed their expulsion. However, the expulsion attempt was ultimately unsuccessful, and Nosotros remained an influential force within the FAI.

=== October 1934 ===
In the summer of 1934, the Catalan socialist politicians Rafael Vidiella and José Vila Cuenca met with the Nosotros group members Ascaso, Durruti and Garcia Oliver. They proposed that the CNT join with the Unión General de Trabajadores (UGT) and the ERC to carry out an uprising against the right-wing government. Ascaso agreed to a meeting with the UGT leader Francisco Largo Caballero, but it never took place, as ERC leader Lluís Companys refused to meet with members of the CNT-FAI. Companys believed that his escamots militia would be enough to resist the Spanish government, without any need for anarchist support. When the Revolution of 1934 broke out in Catalonia, it received little support from the CNT-FAI, and many of its members were arrested by the Catalan government. Nosotros openly opposed the uprising. Less than a day after the Catalan State was proclaimed by Companys, it was suppressed by the Spanish Republican Army. Garcia Oliver proclaimed the Catalan revolt to have been as poorly planned as the December 1933 insurrection.

== Civil War ==
=== Preparations ===
Despite the repressions that followed the 1934 revolution, by early 1935, Nosotros managed to regroup. Believing that the CNT-FAI was heading towards civil war against the right-wing, Nosotros met to discuss how to strengthen the organisation. Garcia Oliver called for the formation of neighbourhood committees, which would link together CNT and FAI groups at a local level, and could then federate together from the bottom-up. He proposed the formation of guerrilla military units, each composed of 100 people, which would attack selected targets. As some anarchists opposed the proposal, still holding to the old doctrine of revolutionary spontaneity, Nosotros called a meeting of local groups in Barcelona. In May 1935, the meeting was held on Passatge dels Escudellers, where Nosotros put the issue of revolutionary strategy on the agenda. When one attendee raised the issue of armed robberies, Durruti proclaimed his opposition to such actions, believing that they discredited the CNT-FAI, and called for anarchists to distance themselves from armed robberies. He admitted that the Nosotros group had previously used such tactics, but now called for them to be left in the past and for collective action to be prioritised over individual action. He then proclaimed his belief that civil war could break out at any moment, and that anarchists needed to organise militias in order to take a leading role in the conflict. Over the subsequent months, Nosotros became more critical of individual acts of robbery and sabotage, believing them ineffective and even detrimental to the CNT.

Following the collapse of the right-wing government in late 1935, a general election was scheduled for February 1936. On the right, Gil-Robles aimed to establish a totalitarian dictatorship; while on the left, electoral efforts were coordinated around the Popular Front. Companys attempted to convince the CNT to cease its anti-electoral agitation, dispatching Francesc Farreras and Celestí Martí Salvat to meet with Miguel García Vivancos and arrange a meeting with Nosotros. The Nosotros met to discuss the proposal, as Garcia Oliver believed if they did not provide a prompt response then Companys would turn to other members of the CNT. Aurelio Fernández, Buenaventura Durruti, Miguel García Vivancos, Gregorio Jover, Antonio Loredo Martínez, Antonio Ortiz and Ricardo Sanz all gathered at Garcia Oliver's apartment in El Poblenou. Garcia Oliver believed that, if the CNT abstained, then it would be morally equivalent to voting for the right-wing. He thus proposed that anarchists tactically vote for the Popular Front; in exchange for their votes, he requested that the Popular Front provide the CNT with weapons to fight back against a military coup, which he believed would be inevitable following a left-wing electoral victory. Ascaso, Durruti and Garcia Oliver met with the Catalan nationalists two days later. At the meeting, Companys apologised for his conduct during the 1934 Revolution and urged them to vote for the Popular Front, promising the release of anarchist political prisoners. When the three requested weapons in return for their support, Companys argued his belief that a military coup was unlikely and that the state would be able to deter a right-wing uprising, although he promised that he would provide arms after the Popular Front won the elections. The Nosotros group subsequently agreed to use their influence to prevent the CNT-FAI from advocating for abstention. By the time of the election, the Nosotros group was organising defense committees and forming links with soldiers, in preparation for a coming civil war.

Amidst rising far-right terrorism that had followed the left-wing electoral victory, in May 1936, the CNT held its 5th National Congress in Zaragoza. Representing Nosotros at the congress, Garcia Oliver argued against political sectarianism, calling for unity between the various factions of the CNT. The far-left benefitted greatly from the congress, with Nosotros gaining 200 new members in the aftermath. Even outside of the group, anarchists considered prime minister Santiago Casares Quiroga to be doing nothing to prevent the rise of reactionary sentiments within the Spanish Army. They thus sought to form confederal militias, in order to defend the anarchist movement from any military coup. Meanwhile, the UGT had begun to seek an alliance with the anarchists, with Francisco Largo Caballero approaching Nosotros in June 1936 to ask for their support. In protest against this, some authoritarian socialists in Catalonia broke away from the PSOE and merged with Catalan communists to form the Unified Socialist Party of Catalonia (PSUC). Fearing the rise of the moderate socialists and communists, the anarchists accepted Largo Caballero's overtures and formed an alliance with the UGT.

=== Joining the war effort ===
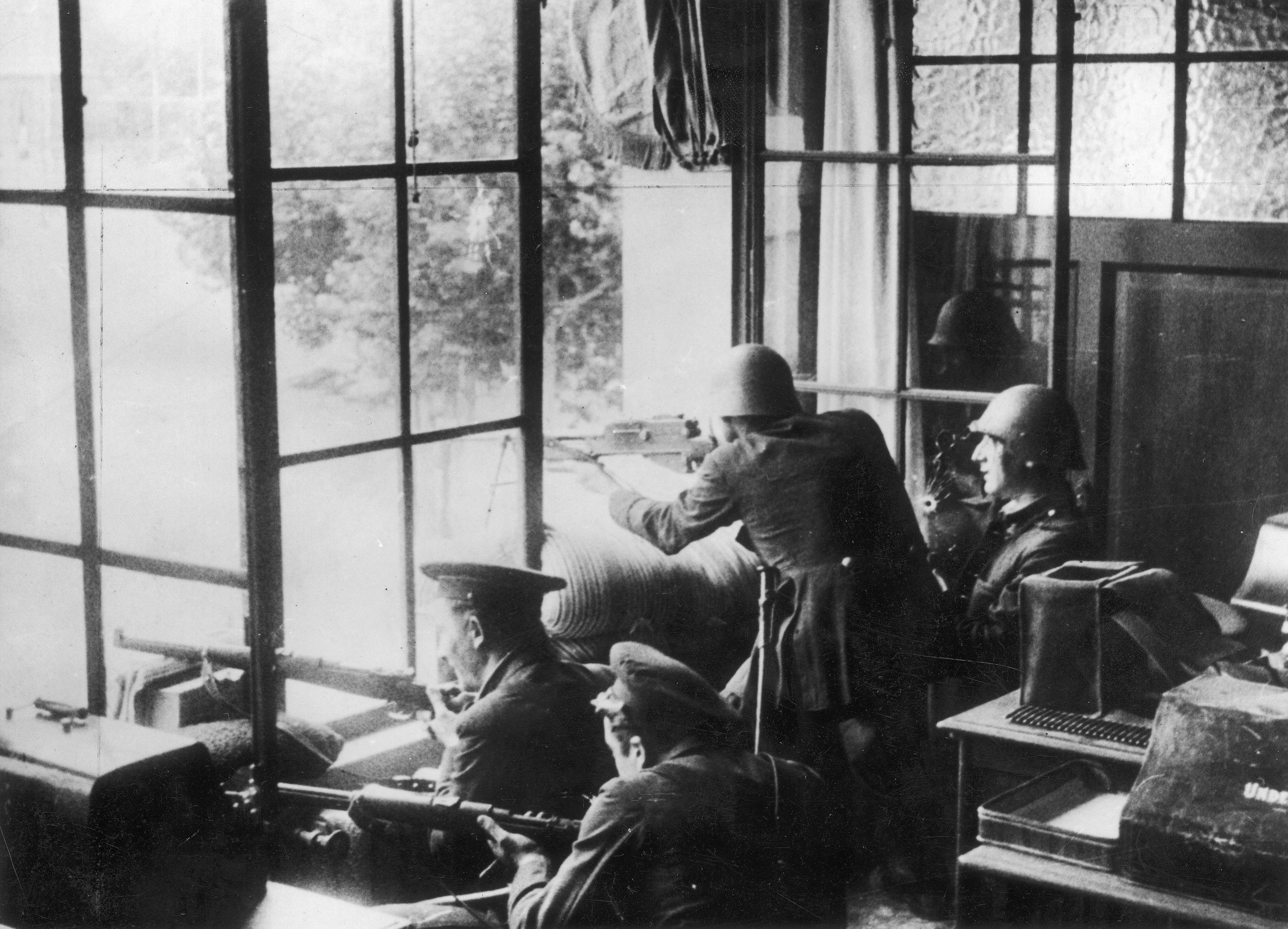
Republican soldiers fighting against the July 1936 military uprising in Barcelona

When news of the Spanish coup of July 1936 reached Barcelona, the Nosotros group was already fully prepared and implemented their contingency plan for when the coup was launched in Barcelona. Members of the Nosotros group, led by Durruti, immediately went to the headquarters of the FAI. Having been preparing for such an event for over a month, they arrived with weapons and convinced the CNT transport union to call a general strike. By 22:00 on 17 July 1936, public transit was halted in Barcelona. Barricades were erected throughout the city, while Nosotros established a command post near La Rambla. The group posted cadres throughout the city, and outfitted trucks to function as mobile headquarters during the fighting. Nosotros led the attack against the Drassanes barracks, where they faced down the military uprising in Barcelona. Francisco Ascaso was killed during the fighting, but eventually the rebel soldiers surrendered to the anarchists. Nosotros reunited and Garcia Oliver declared victory.

Following the defeat of the coup, Catalan President Companys called a meeting of all the left-wing factions in the city, with the Nosotros group being represented by Joan Garcia Oliver. The meeting resolved to establish the Central Committee of Antifascist Militias of Catalonia (CCMA), which the anarchists aimed to use to direct the Spanish Revolution. Garcia Oliver himself had proposed that the Nosotros group, led by Durruti, seize government buildings throughout Barcelona and assert anarchist control of Revolutionary Catalonia. But Durruti opposed his proposal, believing that the priority was to liberate Zaragoza from the Nationalists; he insisted that the anarchist seizure of power be deferred until after they took Aragon, which would establish a more solid territory for a libertarian communist society.

After attending the funeral of Francisco Ascaso, Buenaventura Durruti set about organising the anti-fascist militias and was appointed as their commander-in-chief. On 23 July, Durruti handed command over to Enric Pérez Farràs, who dispatched the militias to the front lines in Aragon. At the head of the Nosotros militia, Pérez Farràs countered the Nationalist advance at Barbastro. Inspired by Nestor Makhno's Revolutionary Insurgent Army of Ukraine, Durruti organised his own militia column according to anarchist principles, eschewing rank, electing all officers and collectively deciding on strategy. Members of Nosotros, including Joan Garcia Oliver and Ricardo Sanz, led the new executive committee of the militias. The Nosotros group threw itself into the war effort: Aurelio Fernández sat on the CCMA; Joan Garcia Oliver led the Aguiluchos Column; Gregorio Jover led the Ascaso Column; Antonio Ortiz led the South Ebro Column; and Ricardo Sanz oversaw military education and training at the barracks in Pedralbes. Each group member had complete autonomy over their own area of operations. After Durruti was killed in the Siege of Madrid, Sanz was transferred to the Spanish capital to replace him as the commander of the Durruti Column.

Having learnt from the failures of the insurrections of the early 1930s, the Nosotros group moderated itself during the civil war, collaborating closely with the Republican government. But as the Communist Party of Spain (PCE) gained more power in the Republican government, some anarchists turned back towards insurrectionary anarchism and political sectarianism. Embittered by the deaths of Ascaso and Durruti, Nosotros member Gregorio Jover joined the Friends of Durruti, a hardline anarchist group that reminded him of the old anarchist affinity groups of the 1920s. Following the May Days, several members of Nosotros were arrested for "military crimes", including Gregorio Jover and Miguel García Vivancos. Some anarchists responded to increasing political repression under the Juan Negrín government by attempting to revive the old terrorist tactics used by Nosotros, with a new group called Ácrata attempting to carry out an anti-communist campaign in August 1937.

== Bibliography ==
- Christie, Stuart (2008). We, the Anarchists: A Study of the Iberian Anarchist Federation (FAI). AK Press. ISBN 9781904859758. LCCN 2007939202.
- Kern, Robert W. (1978). Red Years/Black Years: A Political History of Spanish Anarchism, 1911-1937. Institute for the Study of Human Issues. ISBN 0-915980-54-1. LCCN 77-13595.
- Paz, Abel (2006) [1996]. Durruti in the Spanish Revolution. Translated by Morse, Chuck. Edinburgh: AK Press. ISBN 1-904859-50-X. LCCN 2006920974. OCLC 482919277.
