= Los Errantes =

Spanish anarchist militant group in Latin America

The Wanderers
- Los Errantes
- Leaders: Buenaventura Durruti; Francisco Ascaso; Gregorio Jover
- Dates active: December 1924–June 1926
- Country: Cuba (January–February 1925); Mexico (February–May 1925); Chile (June–August 1925); Argentina (August 1925–February 1926); France (April–June 1926)
- Ideology: Anarchism
- Political position: Far-left
- Size: 2–7

Los Errantes (English: The Wanderers) was a Spanish anarchist militant group, which carried out a series of bank robberies in Latin America during the 1920s. Exiled from Spain by the dictatorship of Primo de Rivera, Buenaventura Durruti and Francisco Ascaso moved to Cuba, where they organised trade unions and participated in strike actions. After assassinating one of their employers, they fled the country to Mexico, where they were joined by Gregorio Jover and carried out robberies to finance the activities of the General Confederation of Workers (CGT). They then carried out a bank robbery in Valparaíso before heading on to the Argentine capital of Buenos Aires. As the Argentine anarchist movement was divided over the issue of robberies and assassinations, the group held off for some months. After a series of botched robberies of train stations by Spanish men in Buenos Aires, the group's identities were provided to the Argentine police. They then carried out a bank robbery in San Martín, before escaping the continent back to Europe.

In Paris, Los Errantes plotted the assassination of Spanish King Alfonso XIII, but they were arrested before they could carry it out. Following a trial, extradition proceedings were initiated against them by the Argentine government, with the backing of the Primo de Rivera dictatorship. Defence campaigns in France and Argentina ultimately resulted in the French government passing a new extradition law, which set terms for the fulfilment of extradition requests. Under these terms, with the Argentine government facing social unrest and the French government facing removal, Los Errantes were released.

== Background ==
During the early 1920s, the rising influence of organised anarcho-syndicalism in Spain, and an internal conflict within the Spanish government over the conduct of the Rif War, had provoked the preparation of a military coup by General Miguel Primo de Rivera. To resist the coming coup, the anarchist group Los Solidarios planned to rob a branch of the Bank of Spain in Xixón and use the money to purchase weaponry. On 1 September 1923, the group made off with 650,000 pesetas. Some of their members took the money to Bilbao, where they purchased rifles, while others hid out in the mountains. When the latter group's position was attacked by the Civil Guard, some managed to escape, while others were arrested or killed.

Following the 1923 Spanish coup d'état and the establishment of the dictatorship of Primo de Rivera, the group broke some of its members out of prison and dispatched its two most wanted members – Buenaventura Durruti and Francisco Ascaso – to Paris. In the French capital, they used the remaining funds from the Xixón heist to establish a publishing house. In March 1924, the dictatorship arrested and killed a number of the group's members, including participants in the Xixón heist. Domingo Ascaso managed to escape to France, where he plotted an insurrection to overthrow the dictatorship. After the defeat of the attempted insurrection in November 1924, many Spanish anarchist militants fled into exile in Latin America. Seeking to gain support for further revolutionary actions against the dictatorship, in December 1924, Buenaventura Durruti and Francisco Ascaso set off to the Americas.

== Cuba ==
After a brief stop in New York, Ascaso and Durruti went to Havana. At the time, the Republic of Cuba was ruled by the United States-backed government of Gerardo Machado, which had overseen a deterioration of living conditions for the working class. The two Spaniards stayed at the home of a young Cuban anarchist, but quickly came to disagree on issues of strategy. Cuban anarchists largely focused on education and opposed the revolutionary tactics of the Spanish anarchists; their host warned them that they would be expelled or imprisoned if they attempted any agitation. The two insisted that, while propaganda was important, it needed to be accompanied by direct action and strong organisation. They were not deterred by the pessimism of the Cuban anarchists. Inspired by the Cuban War of Independence, they hoped to see Cuba achieve economic independence from American capitalism.

Ascaso and Durruti found jobs as dockworkers and were quickly exposed to the poor living and working conditions of the trade. Having been disappointed by their union representatives and the suppression of past strike actions, Cuban dockers had become fatalistic about their situation. The two responded that the workers were right to distrust their union leaders, but cautioned against individual rebellion. They instead called for the creation of a rank-and-file trade union, which could drive collective action towards the fulfilment of their demands. Using plain language, they communicated the need for self-organisation without hierarchy, an idea which soon took hold. Before long, the dockworkers had formed a union and federated it together with unions in the tobacco and food industries. But their union organising also drew the attention of the police, forcing Ascaso and Durruti to leave Havana.

The two were guided to Santa Clara Province, where they found new jobs harvesting sugarcane on an estate near Palmira and Cruces. Not long after their arrived, the estate owner reduced the workers' wages, provoking a sitdown strike. But the strike was swiftly broken up, its leaders arrested and severely beaten by foremen, and the workers were forced to return to work. Durruti and Ascaso decided to take revenge against the estate owner. He was discovered dead the following morning. His body was full of stab wounds and had a note pinned to it, attributing the murder to Los Errantes (English: The Wanderers). By the time the police began their search, Ascaso and Durruti were already in Camagüey Province. Newspapers reported that Los Errantes were a Spanish gang and alleged that they had already executed half a dozen employers for mistreating their workers. The police carried out mass raids, beat peasants and burned down houses, in an attempt to intimidate anyone that may have sympathised with Los Errantes. As the search continued, the murder of a foreman in Holguín Province was attributed to Los Errantes, which made the police unsure about the location of the culprits and intimidated employers into fortifying their estates.

Ascaso and Durruti realised they would not be able to stay in Cuba. They went to Havana, where they rented a cutter, which they used to hijack a fishing vessel. They forced the skipper to take the boat into the sea, where they demanded the boat be sailed to Mexico.

== Mexico ==
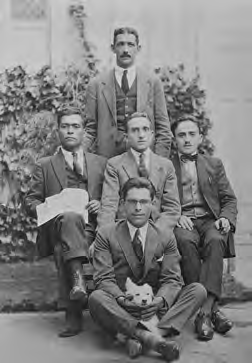
Los Errantes in Mexico

Los Errantes disembarked at Yucatán, where they paid the Cuban sailors for their trouble. They were immediately noticed by officers of the Mexican Treasury, who suspected them of being smugglers. They were arrested and taken towards Progreso, but on the way Durruti bribed the agents for their release and directions to Veracruz. They were greeted there by a Mexican anarchist, who brought them to Mexico City. There they met Rafael Quintero, the leader of the General Confederation of Workers (CGT). Quintero secured them a place to stay at the CGT's publishing house, and after he informed them of their financial difficulties in sustaining their publication, the two immediately donated 40 pesos. They were saddened to hear about the struggles of the Mexican anarcho-syndicalist movement, which was only being kept alive by the legacy of the Revolution; most Mexican anarcho-syndicalists had either died or joined the government.

In March 1925, Los Errantes were joined in Mexico by Alejandro Ascaso and Gregorio Jover. At Quintero's suggestion, they found residence at a farm in Tecomán, where they linked up with the local anarchist group. In April 1925, the group robbed a fabric factory and donated the money to the CGT, which used it to sustain its publication and to establish rationalist schools. Mexican police soon began searching for Los Errantes, so they decided to leave the country. Having been living in a luxury hotel, registered under the assumed identity of a wealthy Peruvian mine owner named "Mendoza", they packed their bags and left without paying the bill.

== Chile ==
By May 1925, Los Errantes had sold most of their belongings to finance their trip to Cuba. But as the country was still not safe for them, they only stayed there briefly. After robbing a bank in Havana, they immediately set sail on a steamship to Valparaíso, in Chile. They arrived in the city on 9 June 1925, and spent the subsequent month working as handymen. At the boarding house where they stayed, they were often heard speaking openly about their plans to finance the revolutionary movement against the Spanish monarchy.

On 16 July 1925, Los Errantes robbed a branch of the Bank of Chile, taking 46,923 Chilean pesos and escaping in a car. According to a police report, they shot a bank employee that attempted to stop their car from leaving. While Durruti, the Ascaso brothers and Jover remained in Chile, their accomplice Antonio Rodríguez took the money back to Spain to finance the underground movement against the dictatorship. The rest of Los Errantes continued working in the city until August 1925, when they departed for Buenos Aires, the capital of Argentina.

== Argentina ==
By the time Los Errantes arrived in Argentina, police from three different countries were already trying to catch them. They visited the offices of the anarchist newspaper La Antorcha and were greeted by its editor Donato Antonio Rizo, who informed them of how the Argentine anarchist movement had split over how to respond to state terrorism. In order to avoid aggravating the schism within the Argentine anarchist movement, Los Errantes decided to refrain from carrying out any violent attacks or robberies and instead sought dialogue with both factions. Los Errantes already knew Spanish anarchists that were living in the city, including Diego Abad de Santillán and Emilio López Arango, who both wrote for La Protesta, which took a middle position between illegalism and reformism. Rizo had also told them about the militant anarchists Severino di Giovanni and Miguel Arcángel Roscigna, who were both supported by La Antorcha. Using their contacts, they were able to find jobs: Durruti worked in the docks, Francisco Ascaso worked as a cook and Jover assembled cabinets; Alejandro Ascaso himself left the city. For the following months, they lived mostly unassuming lives.

On the night of 18 October 1925, there was an armed robbery against an Anglo Tramway station in the neighbourhood of Palermo. The money had been put in the safe and the keys to it were with the boss, who had already left by the time the robbers arrived. They ended up leaving with only a small bag of coins, amounting to 38 pesos, and got away in their car. The Capital Police were confused by reports of the gunmen having Spanish accents, as they were unaware of anyone that met the description. Knowing the robbers had gotten away with so little, they awaited their next heist. Just after midnight, on 17 November 1925, robbers with Spanish accents held up a ticket-seller at the Primera Junta station in Caballito. After they grabbed a wooden box and headed towards the exit, the seller shouted for help and one of the robbers responded by shooting his gun into the air. A police officer heard the commotion and intercepted the robbers with his gun drawn, but the lookouts saw the officer first and shot him twice, killing him. When they tried to get away, their car failed to start, forcing them to get out and run. They ultimately discovered that the wooden box had no money in it.

As the Argentine police began to put together their case against the Spaniards, they received files from the Chilean police, which provided the photographs and assumed identities of the Spaniards that had robbed the Bank of Chile. The authorities searched boarding houses and hotels for the Spaniards, while known anarchist activists were detained, but they never found their suspects. As they continued the search, the Argentine police hanged wanted posters of Los Errantes throughout Buenos Aires. Without any leads, the police began to believe the robbers had either fled to Brazil or Uruguay, or that they were in hiding while planning another heist.

At midday on 19 January 1926, seven men got out of a car in San Martín and walked towards a branch of the Bank of Argentina, armed with rifles. While the three stood guard outside, four of the men put on masks and entered the bank branch, shouting with Spanish accents. They collected all the money they could from the counters and the paymasters, ignoring the safe, and left with 64,085 pesos. Two employees attempted to escape and were shot by the robbers, killing one and wounding the other. As they got into their car with the money, police attempted to give chase, but the robbers covered their escape with gunfire.

As Buenos Aires police pushed forward with their investigation, with three additional men now part of the robbers' group, they received vital information from police in Barcelona. The Spanish police identified the four wanted Spaniards as: Buenaventura Durruti (who went by the assumed identity of Ramon Carcano Caballero); Francisco Ascaso (under the name Teodoro Pichardo Ramos); Alejandro Ascaso (under the name Manuel Labrada Pontón); and Gregorio Jover (under the name Manuel Serrano García). They identified them as a dangerous anarchist gang, specifying that Francisco Ascaso was wanted for the murder of Archbishop Juan Soldevila. In collaboration with Mexican and Cuban police, the Argentine and Spanish authorities retraced the steps of Los Errantes from Spain, through Mexico, Cuba and Chile, to Argentina.

Argentine police increased surveillance on the anarchist movement and tightened border controls. Los Errantes were initially unable to find safe haven, as many of their comrades refused to get involved by helping them. They were ultimately assisted by contributors of La Antorcha and El Libertario, with the Spanish anarchist J.C. Este arranging their escape to Montevideo, in Uruguay. While Los Errantes sought false passports for their escape, the Argentine police continued searching for them. The search was complicated on 23 February 1926, when the newspaper ABC reported that Durruti had been arrested in the French city of Bordeaux. This led the Argentine authorities to assume that Los Errantes had already escaped to France.

== France ==
In late February 1926, the anarchists set sail from Montevideo. They transferred to another ship in the Canary Islands, and went on to France. On 30 April 1926, they disembarked at Cherbourg. By May, they were staying at a hotel in Clichy, under the assumed names on their false passports: Durruti was known as Roberto Cotelo, Ascaso as Salvador Arévalo, and Jover as Luis Victorio Rejetto. There were few Spanish anarchists who had remained in Paris, as most had either moved to Belgium, Occitania or Arpitania. The International Press, established by Ascaso and Durruti in 1923, continued to function under the management of Le Libertaire. Spanish anarchist publications had also been established in Paris, where Valeriano Orobón Fernández published Tiempos Nuevos and Liberto Callejas edited Iberón. At this time, Los Errantes met with three young Catalan anarchists who had been implicated in bomb attacks against Spanish Army officers. Los Errantes sent them to Argentina and vouched for them to Miguel Arcángel Roscigna. These three invited Roscigna back to Europe to participate in the activities of Los Errantes, but he declined and stayed in Argentina.

By June 1926, Los Errantes were preparing an assassination attempt against the Spanish king, Alfonso XIII, who was planning to visit Paris. To avoid the police, they blended into Parisian high society, playing tennis at a private club and buying an expensive car, which they planned to use to avoid suspicion at the King's welcome ceremony. As the king's visit drew near, they were unable to find a driver; they had attempted to recruit a comrade from Buenos Aires, as well as Miguel García Vivancos, who had driven them during the Xixón heist, but neither accepted. Pressed for time, they were introduced to another driver, but he turned out to be a police informant.

Alfonso XIII had already survived over a dozen assassination attempts, so when he made plans to visit Paris in 1926, the Spanish embassy requested that Parisian police imprison any exiled Spaniards suspected of anti-monarchist sentiments. On the morning of 25 June 1926, the French police launched a mass raid on the Spanish emigrant community in Paris, arresting about 200 people. As they left their hotel in Clichy, Ascaso, Durruti and Jover were arrested and the weapons cache in their hotel room was discovered. They were sent to La Santé Prison. The government of France also issued a gag order against anti-monarchist publications; Le Libertaire was shut down by police after it ran an editorial deemed insulting to the head of state and its manager was charged with instigating an assassination attempt against the Spanish king. Alfonso XIII arrived in the French capital on 27 June, welcomed by the anthem La Marseillaise.

News of the political repression was not released until 2 July, when Alfonso XIII had already left the country. The police announced to the press that they had uncovered an assassination plot against the Spanish king and had arrested three Spaniards. That same day, Le Libertaire resumed publication, covering the political repression in detail. They also called for protests, demanding that the left-wing French government stop the planned deportation of Spanish anarchists. The Spanish embassy also released a statement announcing the arrest of the would-be assassins and thanking the French authorities for their cooperation. The Spanish embassy then began preparations to demand the extradition of Los Errantes to Spain, although the ambassador himself questioned the viability of such a demand, due to the lack of popular support in France for the Spanish dictatorship. He instead convinced the Argentine embassy to initiate extradition proceedings, believing it more likely for Argentina to succeed. Having now learned that Los Errantes had escaped to Paris, the Argentine government solicited information about the case, from which they discovered that they had escaped using Uruguayan passports.

Argentine police arrested the Uruguayan anarchist Roberto Cotelo, a writer for El Libertario, whose name had been used on Durruti's false passport. He confessed that, on 1 April, he had obtained a Uruguayan passport from the embassy in Buenos Aires and claimed that he had lost it only a few hours later. Cotelo remained in jail for two months, before a judge ordered his release due to an absence of evidence. Although the Argentine press and public had already grown critical of the police's campaign against the anarchists, President Marcelo Torcuato de Alvear dispatched police to Paris to secure the extradition of Los Errantes. The calls for extradition even drew criticism from sensationalist newspapers, including Crítica, which held that there was no evidence of the anarchists' involvement in the San Martín heist.

== Extradition proceedings ==
=== Trial ===
On 7 October 1926, the trial of Ascaso, Durruti and Jover began at the Palais de Justice; they were all charged with the use of false passports, while Ascaso and Durruti faced charges for possession of prohibited weapons. The courtroom audience was packed with police informants, to prevent sympathisers from observing the trial. Due to his knowledge of the French language, Durruti spoke for the group: he stated that they planned to abduct the king and hold him until a revolution broke out in Spain; he also confessed to their possession of weapons and false passports. He justified their actions due to the political repression by the Primo de Rivera dictatorship, stating that they could not have avoided its spy networks without using false passports. The group was defended by the French lawyers Henry Torrès and Henri Berthon, who pressed the French police into admitting that they had been given all their information on the defendants by the Spanish embassy. Berthon himself praised the defendants and said he was honoured to be defending "the most advanced sector of the Spanish opposition".

The three Errantes were ultimately convicted: Ascaso was sentenced to six months, Durruti to three and Jover to two. As Durruti and Jover had already served their sentence in pre-trial detention, only Ascaso spent time in La Santé prison, from which he was released on Christmas Day. But by this time, the French government had already accepted the extradition demands of the Argentine government; Durruti and Jover were subsequently detained in the Conciergerie. To prevent any action against the group, their defense lawyers quickly appealed the extradition to the Court of Cassation. Meanwhile, Le Libertaire called for protests against the extradition, as under French law, they believed they should be considered political refugees.

=== Defense campaign ===
Parisian anarchists had already established the International Anarchist Defense Committee (IADC), through which they had campaigned for the release of the Italian American anarchists Sacco and Vanzetti. Led by the French anarcho-communist Louis Lecoin, the IADC took on the case of Ascaso, Durruti and Jover and established a new committee to support their asylum in France. As the IADC criticised illegalism, which it considered detrimental to the anarchist movement and discouraged as a method of anti-capitalist action, Lecoin instead sought to proclaim the "innocence" of Sacco, Vanzetti, Ascaso, Durruti and Jover. As Lecoin wanted the defense campaign to be broad-based, rather than a specifically anarchist campaign, he set out to convince as many people as possible to stand up for the Italian American and Spanish defendants. Lecoin sought to attack the foreign policy of Raymond Poincaré's government, which had become friendly with the dictatorship of Primo de Rivera, due to mutual interest in the repression of Abd el-Krim's Republic of the Rif, despite the wishes of its own electorate.

Lecoin appealed for support from Caroline Rémy de Guebhard of the Human Rights League (LDH), who had already defended the three Spaniards and denounced the dictatorship of Primo de Rivera. The IADC also began holding political demonstrations in support of Los Errantes, with an inaugural rally on 25 October attracting speakers such as the union leader Lucien Huart, the poet Georges Pioch, and IADC representative Sébastien Faure. The rally received widespread coverage in left-wing newspapers, including L'Humanité, Le Populaire and L'Œuvre. Lecoin also met with the LDH's president Victor Basch, but members of the government had already warned Basch against getting involved with the case, so he told Lecoin that the LDH would not be joining any campaigns in their defense. However, after Lecoin left the meeting, he received a surprise phone call from the secretary of the LDH, informing him that the organisation would in fact be taking on the case. Basch had been convinced by Rémy de Guebhard.

In November 1926, Le Libertaire called another rally to protest the extradition of Ascaso, Durruti and Jover to Argentina, and published a statement of support from the LDH. They also published a letter from Ascaso and Durruti, in which they announced that they were to be handed over to the Argentine police. Although the two accepted their own extradition, they appealed for the French government to grant clemency for Jover, who had two young children. Le Libertaire commented that the letter had provoked numerous members of the General Confederation of Labour (CGT) to pressure their general secretary Léon Jouhaux to intervene; the government responded to Jouhaux that the trial would possibly be reviewed, which prompted Henry Torrès to press his appeal to the Court of Cassation. Torrès also met with the Argentine ambassador, as well as several lawyers and members of parliament, while Lecoin gathered a list of parliamentarians who supported clemency for Los Errantes.

Caught between the French public and foreign governments, the French government delayed handing Los Errantes over to the Argentine government. They instead decided to extradite another Spanish anarchist, José Alamarcha, to Spain. Le Libertaire protested Alamarcha's extradition, proclaiming a lack of evidence against him, which made them doubt the safety of Los Errantes themselves. On 3 December 1926, the LDH was informed by the French government that the fingerprints provided to the authorities by the Argentine police had not been taken from the scene of the San Martín heist, but had actually been given to them by a foreign government. Le Libertaire again proclaimed the innocence of the three Spaniards and demanded their release. The IADC continued to hold public demonstrations in support Ascaso, Durruti and Jover, alongside ones protesting the imminent execution of Sacco and Vanzetti.

On 10 December, Le Libertaire reported on a similar defense campaign taking place in Argentina, where the local anarchist movement threatened action against the Argentine police if the extradition went forward. The Argentine newspaper Crítica defended the Spaniards and criticised the French government for accepting the extradition request without solid evidence against them. Argentine public opinion was largely sympathetic towards the Spanish revolutionaries, but the Argentine police continued to push for extradition and attempted to shut down rallies in support of them. Several independent trade unions, alongside La Antorcha and the Social Prisoner Support Committee, continued to hold impromptu demonstrations in spite of the police. One planned meeting in Plaza Once was surrounded and dispersed by mounted police, but one anarchist chained himself to the railing of a metro entrance and began shouting about the extradition to passersby. He continued his speech, even as the police beat him with batons and attempted to gag him, so police were forced to wait for a locksmith as he continued speaking for another hour.

=== Legislative reforms ===
The issue of extraditing Los Errantes soon escalated to the French Parliament, where several socialist deputies proposed legislation to end the police's control over the proceedings. On 9 December 1929, the Senate passed a law requiring the authorisation of the Court of Cassation for any extraditions, following an intensive investigation and a fair trial for the accused. The law also specified that extradition would be refused if a crime or criminal proceedings were political in nature. Although the reform was implemented, it was not applied retroactively to the case of Los Errantes.

The Chamber of Deputies then requested clarification from the government about the extradition proceedings, with Justice Minister Louis Barthou replying that they would not be extraditing Los Errantes to Spain. The charges against them in Spain were recognised by French law as political actions, but the government considered the charges in Argentina to be common law offences. Despite the distinction, Argentine activists claimed that extraditing the Spaniards to Argentina would inevitably lead to their subsequent extradition to Spain. The defense campaigns in Argentina and France redoubled their efforts to prevent this. On 7 January 1927, the IADC organised a rally at the Salle Wagram, but the building ended up being too small to accommodate the whole crowd. Among the speakers were IDH President Victor Basch, the Spanish writer Miguel de Unamuno, the socialist politicians Ludovic-Oscar Frossard and Henri Sellier, Sébastien Faure of the IADC, and the group's defense lawyers Henry Torrès and Henri Berthon. The rally unanimously demanded the release of Los Errantes.

By this time, 100 deputies of the Chamber of Deputies openly supported the release of Ascaso, Durruti and Jover; additional supporters were gathered by the left-wing deputies André Berthon, Ernest Lafont, Vincent de Moro-Giafferi, Pierre Renaudel and René Richard. The Poincaré government's persistence on the extradition began to threaten its continued position in power. On 11 February, Le Libertaire published a letter from the Ascaso, Durruti and Jover, in which they announced their intention to carry out a hunger strike. Having previously stopped a planned hunger strike after their supporters held a rally against it, they asked their supporters to allow them to go through with it this time. They began their hunger strike two days later.

On 16 February, the government annulled the extradition order and moved for the Senate's bill on extradition law to be voted on by the Chamber of Deputies, with the new provision that it be applied retroactively. The Argentine ambassador responded by pressuring the Foreign Affairs Ministry to continue with the extradition, promising that the Argentine government would only prosecute them for common law offenses and would not deport them to Spain. But the French government held off until the new law on extraditions was ratified, so the case would be passed to the Court of Cassation. On 28 February, the Chamber of Deputies ratified the extradition law without any debate and the case of Los Errantes was forwarded to the Court of Cassation. A few days before the hearing was due to take place, French police reported that they had uncovered a plot to break the anarchists out of detention. Le Libertaire immediately denounced the allegations as an attempt by police to influence the court case.

On 27 April, the French government finally told the Argentine ambassador that they would hand the Spaniards over to his government. He requested that the Argentine Navy dispatch the Bahía Blanca to Le Havre, where it would pick up Los Errantes. According to French law, Argentina would then have a grace period of four weeks to take possession of the anarchists; if they had not done so by 27 May, the extradition would be revoked. La Antorcha responded by denouncing the Argentine government as an immoral and unjust institution. Anarchists of the Social Prisoner Support Committee issued a challenge to the Alvear administration, announcing that they would defend the three Spaniards from the moment they arrived in Argentina. International Red Aid also attempted to extend its support to Los Errantes, but it was criticised by Argentine anarchists due to its lack of support for anarchist political prisoners in the Soviet Union. Meanwhile, Louis Lecoin installed himself in the Palais Bourbon, where he constantly collected signatures from deputies, attempting to gain a majority to declare against the extradition.

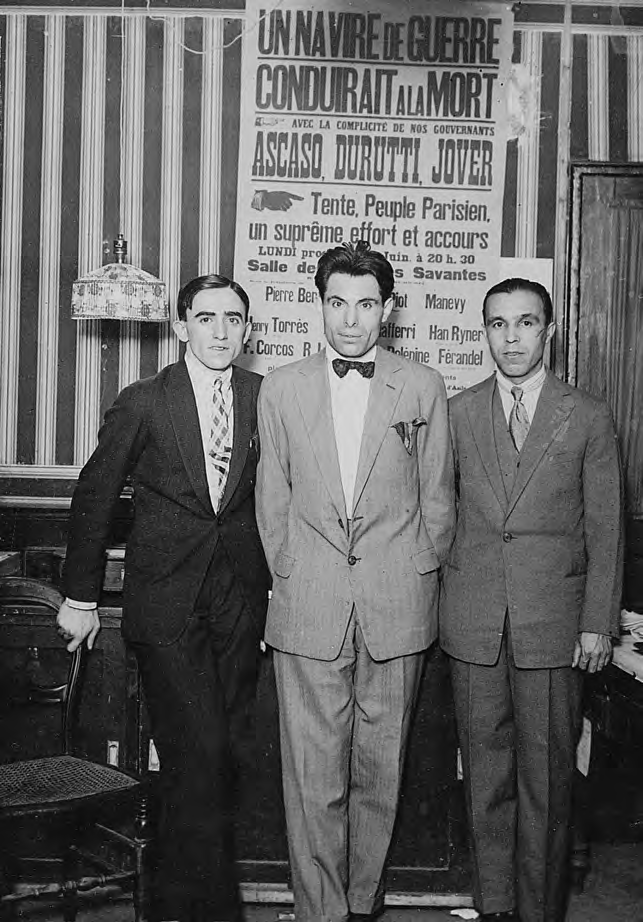
Francisco Ascaso (left), Buenaventura Durruti (centre) and Gregorio Jover (right) after their release in July 1927

In the end, when 27 May 1927 arrived, the Bahía Blanca had not yet docked in France. Worried about exacerbating the rising social tensions in Argentina, the Alvear government had retreated from its push for extradition. They feigned an accident that had halted the Bahía Blanca and instead asked the French Navy to escort the Spaniards to Argentina. The French government refused, leading each government to blame the other for the failure of the extradition process. According to the new extradition law, the French government would have to release Ascaso, Durruti and Jover. By this time, Lecoin had acquired a majority in the Chamber of Deputies, which scheduled a debate on 7 July 1927. Two hours before the debate, the prime minister's spokesperson Louis Malvy met with Lecoin, cautioning him that his interpellation could bring down the Poincaré government. In exchange for dropping the interpellation, Lecoin demanded that Ascaso, Durruti and Jover be released; Malvy agreed and Los Errantes were released the following morning. La Antorcha celebrated their release as a defeat for reactionary forces. Francisco Ascaso was reunited with his sister and mother, while Jover finally got to see his partner and two children. Los Errantes and their families had an impromptu dinner at an apartment on Rue du Repos, where Durruti proclaimed they would "continue the struggle with even greater intensity than before". Los Errantes carried on their militant activism, but never returned to Latin America. They left a marked influence on "expropriator anarchism" in Argentina, where their comrade Miguel Arcángel Roscigna continued carrying out raids.

== Aftermath ==
=== Clandestinity in France ===
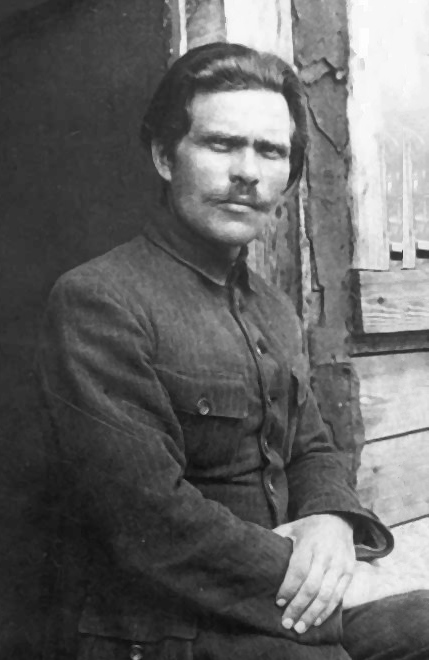
Nestor Makhno, the Ukrainian anarchist revolutionary who met with Ascaso and Durruti after their release from prison

After their release, the French government immediately ordered the three Spanish anarchists to leave the country within two weeks. No other country's embassy would grant them entrance visas, so they began to consider other options. Wanting to stay with his family, Jover forged documents for himself and moved to Béziers, where he lived with his family and worked as a cabinetmaker. At this time, Durruti and Ascaso frequented the Anarchist Bookshop in Ménilmontant, where they met the French anarchists Émilienne Morin and Berthe Favert, with whom they respectively formed relationships. They also met the Ukrainian anarchist Nestor Makhno, a revolutionary leader whose Makhnovist movement was destroyed by the Red Army, forcing him into exile in Paris. Wounded physically and emotionally by the war, Makhno had found it difficult to adapt to life in exile.

Having followed the trial of Durruti and Ascaso, Makhno agreed to meet them at his family's apartment. Makhno spoke optimistically about the prospects of revolution in Spain, praising the organisational abilities of the Spanish anarchists, and expressed hope that he would live to participate in it. He told them about the federation of agrarian and industrial communes he had built in Ukraine. He claimed that popular participation had ensured the prevention of any bureaucracy emerging, with popular assemblies guiding communal life and military committees overseeing the war effort. He believed that the Red Army had suppressed the revolution in Ukraine because the Makhnovists had proved the authoritarian tactics of the Bolsheviks were unnecessary. Before they left, he told them: "I hope that you'll do better than us when the time comes. [...] If I'm still alive when your revolution begins, I'll be one fighter among many." Makhno's conception of a revolutionary army would later form the basis for the confederal militias, which Ascaso and Durruti went on to establish during the Spanish Civil War.

On 23 July 1927, Ascaso and Durruti were escorted by French police to the Belgium–France border. When the Belgian border guards refused to allow them into the country, the French police waited until night fell and smuggled the two across the border. They made their way to Brussels, where they were received by Marcel Dieu, who found them space to stay while they waited for to be granted political asylum. The following month, the two learned that the Italian American anarchists Sacco and Vanzetti had been executed by the United States government. In Argentina, Severino di Giovanni carried out a series of dynamite attacks against American institutions in revenge for the execution. In late August, Belgian police took Ascaso and Durruti back to the border and smuggled them back into France. The Belgian authorities then alerted the French police of the anarchists' return to France, prompting Parisian police to raid the homes of anyone suspected of sheltering them.

Facing deportation back to Spain if they stayed in Paris, the anarchists found refuge at the house of the pacifist Émile Bouchet in Joigny. There they had some close calls with the Gendarmerie, but Bouchet managed to keep them safe from arrest. Ascaso and Durruti then briefly returned to Paris. There the Revolutionary Alliance Committee, which had recently been formed by members of Los Solidarios to foment insurrections in Italy and Spain, advised them to move to Lyon. They arrived in Lyon in November 1927. As the city lacked a thorough police presence, they were able to remain covert, using false documents to secure housing and jobs. There they learned about the formation of the Iberian Anarchist Federation (FAI) earlier that year.

=== Debates in the CNT ===
Ascaso and Durruti became embroiled in an internal debate within the National Confederation of Labour (CNT) over whether the union should integrate into a post-revolutionary government after the overthrow of the Primo de Rivera dictatorship. This raised the question of the CNT's commitment to libertarian communism and anti-statism, as in alliance with political parties, it could achieve positive reforms for the working class. Some anarchists responded to these proposals by arguing for anarchism to be made the dominant force in the labour movement, while others advocated for a division of labour between union organisers and political agitators. Ascaso and Durruti themselves argued that anarchists ought to accelerate the revolution against the Spanish ruling class by agitating among the masses to raise class consciousness and encourage revolutionary initiatives. Although they believed that the CNT was an organisation capable of carrying this out, they held that it should focus on long-term revolutionary objectives, rather than short-term improvements to working conditions. Their suggestions were rejected by orthodox anarchists, who accused them of "anarcho-Bolshevism". The relative inactivity of the Spanish exiles had made debates over the issue very heated.

Some Spanish anarchists proposed that exiled CNT members establish their own sections in France, but Durruti and Ascaso rejected the proposal, as they believed that Spanish workers would not be able to organise openly for better working conditions and that it would divert attention away from revolutionary initiatives. By January 1928, Joaquín Cortés had been expelled from Argentina, and Ricardo Sanz and Miguel García Vivancos had left Spain. When all three arrived in Paris, Durruti and Ascaso went to visit them and discuss news from the two countries. Sanz reported on the divisions within the CNT, which had consumed all organising meetings, and on various failed attacks against the dictatorship. In contrast, Cortés told them about how the Argentine Regional Workers' Federation (FORA) was recovering from its own splits and had risen to count 100,000 members. But he also expressed worry about the threat of a fascist coup in the country, reporting on the rising incidences of violence after the execution of Sacco and Vanzetti, which had given way to a fierce conflict between insurrectionists (led by Severino di Giovanni) and theoreticians (led by Diego Abad de Santillán).

At a meeting of the Spanish-speaking Anarchist Groups in France, CNT representative Bruno Carreras spoke about the difficulties the CNT faced in organising clandestinely and proposed the creation of CNT sections in France. Most of the attendees, including Cortés and Ascaso, opposed the proposal, arguing against Carreras's position that Spanish exiles preferred to join the CNT rather than participate in anarchist groups. Sections of the CNT were established in April 1928, but since they could not take public action, they instead organised under the banner of the French Confédération Générale du Travail-Syndicaliste Révolutionnaire (CGT-SR).

=== Attempts to secure visas ===
In April 1928, Ascaso and Durruti were arrested and imprisoned for six months. While they were in prison, the Asylum Support Committee continued to search for entrance visas for the two Spanish anarchists, but most countries denied their requests. Only the Soviet Union gave a positive reply, but Makhno had advised against them going there. They ultimately decided to pursue a Soviet entrance visa, so they could use it to hide out in Central Europe. They went to Brussels and spoke to the Soviet embassy about visas, but the embassy staff informed them that the relevant paperwork for them was in the Parisian embassy. Although they were barred from re-entering France, they covertly travelled to Paris. In order to receive their visas, they were required to pledge their loyalty to the Soviet Union; they refused.

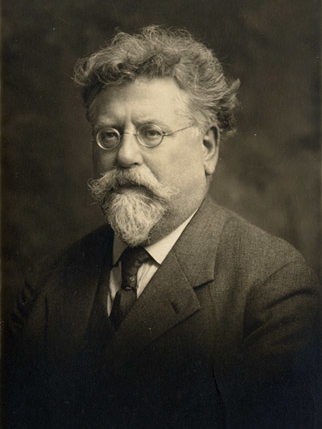
Rudolf Rocker, the German anarchist who helped Durruti and Ascaso during their time in Berlin

Instead, towards the end of October 1928, the two moved to Berlin, as Germany was the only European country where the anarchist movement still maintained an organisational strength. Valeriano Orobón Fernández provided them with the address of Augustin Souchy, who briefly took the anarchists into his home. The anarcho-syndicalist theoretician Rudolf Rocker then found them a safe house in the suburbs, where they lodged in secret. Rocker and Erich Mühsam reached out to the Social Democratic politician Paul Kampffmeyer, who had previously aided anarchists fleeing the Soviets. But after two weeks, Kampffmeyer reported that he was blocked from moving further. The Free State of Prussia, which was run by a Social Democratic-led coalition with the Catholic Centre Party, wanted to avoid a governmental crisis by giving asylum to Ascaso, who had killed Archbishop Juan Soldevila. Kampffmeyer commented that he could have succeeded if they had assassinated Alfonso XIII, but that the Centre Party would not allow asylum to someone that had killed a Catholic Archbishop.

When Rocker and Souchy informed them of the rejection, they decided to go back to Mexico, where they would be able to go unnoticed and find work. Without telling the Spaniards, who they thought would turn them down, the German anarchists began to raise funds to cover their trip. Through Muhsam, they spoke to the actor Alexander Granach, who immediately gave them 400 Reichsmarks without asking for any details about who it would be helping.

=== Residency in Brussels ===
With Granach's money, Ascaso and Durruti left for Belgium, planning to take a ship to Mexico from Antwerp. But when they arrived in Belgium in early 1929, they found the country had relaxed its immigration policies. Aided again by Marcel Dieu, they applied to the Belgian police, who agreed to provide them with residency on the condition that the two change their names. With residency secured, they ruled out moving to Mexico, choosing instead to remain among the many Spanish exiles who had also settled in Brussels, and sent most of their money back to Rocker. On Rue Haute, Spanish refugees had established the Casa de Pueblo, where exiles gathered to organise against the Primo de Rivera dictatorship. Ascaso painted the building's facade, while his brother Domingo sold stationery, Durruti found a job as a metalworker and Liberto Callejas worked in the hotel where the Catalan nationalist leader Francesc Macià was staying. The Spanish anarchists also frequented Marcel Dieu's bookshop, which leased space for a workshop, ran by Léo Campion and the "Barasco firm". Many of the Spanish anarchists, including Ascaso and Durruti, answered to the name "Barasco". Despite the conditions of the Great Depression, and despite their open distaste for their employers, Ascaso and Durruti were able to find regular work in Brussels. During this time, the Spanish anarchists were closely surveilled by the Brussels police.

In January 1929, Ascaso and Durruti collaborated with Francesc Macià on a plot by José Sánchez-Guerra to overthrow the dictatorship. Although the plot itself was unsuccessful, it mobilised Spanish anarchists. On 6 February 1929, Spanish anarchist groups in Paris called for all Spanish anarchists to prepare to return to Spain in the event of a rebellion against the dictatorship. Erguido Blanco was tasked with acquiring weapons and discussed military questions with Nestor Makhno. On 26 December 1929, L'Indépendance Belge reported that police had been surveilling the Italian Camillo Berneri, who had allegedly plotted to assassinate Belgian Princess Marie-José and the Italian Crown Prince Umberto; Ascaso and Durruti were implicated in the alleged plot. Later it was discovered that the plot had been fabricated by agents of Fascist Italy. Berneri was deported for carrying a false passport, but Ascaso and Durruti were allowed to remain.

By the end of 1929, the dictatorship of Primo de Rivera had begun to collapse under internal pressure. On 28 January 1930, Primo de Rivera was dismissed by Alfonso XIII and replaced with Dámaso Berenguer. Although the dictatorship was temporarily preserved, Berenguer attempted to restore constitutional order in Spain. The Spanish anarcho-syndicalist movement was revived and many anarchist exiles began to return to the country. Durruti and Ascaso were themselves tempted to return, but as many of the repressive structures of the dictatorship remained in place, Liberto Callejas cautioned them to wait for the right moment. When the Second Spanish Republic was proclaimed on 14 April 1931, Durruti, Ascaso and Callejas were among the first anarchist exiles to arrive back in Barcelona.

== Bibliography ==
- Bayer, Osvaldo (2015) [1975]. The Anarchist Expropriators: Buenaventura Durruti and Argentina's Working-Class Robin Hoods. Oakland, California: AK Press. ISBN 978-1-84935-223-9. OCLC 908088288.
- Kern, Robert W. (1978). Red Years/Black Years: A Political History of Spanish Anarchism, 1911-1937. Institute for the Study of Human Issues. ISBN 0-915980-54-1. LCCN 77-13595.
- Paz, Abel (2006) [1996]. Durruti in the Spanish Revolution. Translated by Morse, Chuck. Edinburgh: AK Press. ISBN 1-904859-50-X. LCCN 2006920974. OCLC 482919277.
