= 127th Mixed Brigade =

- 127.ª Brigada Mixta
- Active: April 1937 – March 1939
- Country: Spanish Republic
- Allegiance: Republican faction
- Branch: Spanish Republican Army
- Type: Infantry
- Size: Brigade
- Part of: 28th Division
- Engagements: Spanish Civil War: Aragon Offensive; Extremadura campaign

The 127th Mixed Brigade was a unit of the Spanish Republican Army, belonging to the 28th Division, created during the Spanish Civil War. It operated on the Aragón and Extremadura fronts.

== History ==
The unit was created on April 28, 1937, on the Huesca front, from the old Red and Black Column. Command of the brigade fell to Máximo Franco Cavero, with Ramón de la Torre Martín as Chief of Staff and the anarcho-syndicalist Manuel Lozano Guillén as political commissioner. It was integrated into the 28th Division, which was the former Ascaso Column. In June it took part in the Huesca Offensive and a few months later it also participated in the Zaragoza Offensive, attacking the town of Zuera —without success—. (Note: Where it acted as a reinforcement for the 27th Division, after this unit had repeatedly collided with the nationalist's defenses.) During the Battle of Teruel, while the 125th and 126th mixed brigades participated in the fighting, the 127th MB remained located in Upper Aragón as a reserve force for the Eastern Army.

On March 9, 1938, after the start of the nationalist offensive on the Aragon front, the brigade was ordered to march to the threatened sector to try to contain the enemy attack. On March 11, however, the brigade disbanded due to contact with the enemy in the area of Alagón-Oliete. On March 13, it lost the towns of Andorra, Ariño and Alloza, having to retreat to the area between Teruel and Escorihuela, where it was located until April 23. Its remains ended up being reintegrated into the old division. The 127th Brigade, which suffered a major loss, had to be withdrawn to Calles to undergo a reorganization.

In August 1938, it was sent as reinforcement to the Extremadura front, now under the command of the militia major Esteban Serra Colobrans. The brigade intervened in the Republican counterattack that followed the Franco offensive in the Battle of Merida pocket. After crossing the Zújar river, it continued advancing until it was in the vicinity of Castuera. It remained in this sector until it was withdrawn to cover losses suffered. In January 1939, it intervened in the Battle of Peñarroya, participating in the breakdown of the front and managing to advance to the Patuda and Trapera mountains. The unit was dissolved at the end of the war. (Note: According to José Manuel Martínez Bande, during the Casado coup the 127th Mixed Brigade positioned itself alongside the Casadista forces.)

== Commanders ==
Commanders

- Máximo Franco Cavero;
- Esteban Serra Colobrans

Commissars

- Manuel Lozano Guillén

Chiefs of Staff

- Ramón de la Torre Martín;
- Enrique Genovés Guillén

== See also ==
- Mixed Brigades
- Red and Black Column

== Bibliography ==
- Álvarez, Santiago (1989). Los comisarios políticos en el Ejército Popular de la República (in Spanish). Ediciós do Castro.
- Álvarez Fernández, José Ignacio (2007). Memoria y trauma en los testimonios de la represión franquista (in Spanish). Barcelona: Anthropos.
- Casanova, Julián (1985). Anarquismo y revolución en la sociedad rural aragonesa, 1936-1938 (in Spanish). Siglo XXI Editores.
- Engel, Carlos (1999). Historia de las Brigadas Mixtas del Ejército Popular de la República (in Spanish). Madrid: Almena. ISBN 84-922644-7-0.
- Maldonado, José M.ª (2007). El frente de Aragón. La Guerra Civil en Aragón (1936–1938) (in Spanish). Mira Editores. ISBN 978-84-8465-237-3.
- Martínez Bande, José Manuel (1985). El final de la Guerra Civil (in Spanish). Madrid: San Martín. ISBN 84-7140-232-7.
- Téllez, Antonio (1996). La Red de Evasión del Grupo Ponzán. Anarquistas en la guerra secreta contra el franquismo y el nazismo (1936-1944) (in Spanish). Barcelona: Editorial Virus.
