= 125th Mixed Brigade =

Military unit

- Active: April 1937 – March 1939
- Country: Spanish Republic
- Allegiance: Republican faction
- Branch: Spanish Republican Army
- Type: Infantry
- Size: Brigade
- Part of: 28th Division
- Engagements: Spanish Civil War

The 125th Mixed Brigade was a unit of the Spanish Republican Army, integrated into the 28th Division, that participated in the Spanish Civil War.

== History ==
The 125th Mixed Brigade was created on April 28, 1937, on the basis of the Ascaso Column. The resulting unit would be integrated into the 28th Division, also newly created, with Miguel García Vivancos as head of the unit. Vicancos was later succeeded by Antonio Aguilá Collantes and the latter, shortly after, by Juan Mayordomo Moreno. (Note: Vivancos took command of the 25th Division, also of anarchist composition.) During the rest of the year the 125th MB was present at the Huesca front, contributing to the siege of the provincial capital and without taking part in other actions.

In February 1938, while in the Monzón area, it was sent to the Teruel front to aid the republican forces stationed there. After its arrival, on February 12, it attacked the nationalist positions in La Torana, without success. Between the 24th and 28th it had to face new nationalist attacks in this area, after which it withdrew to the plains of Valdecebro. Subsequently, the 125th MB took part in the Aragon and Levante offensives, where it had to withdraw on several occasions due to enemy pressure. By July 24, it was located at the XYZ Line, in Viver-Jérica. However, due to the heavy losses suffered, it had to be withdrawn to Chelva.

In August the 125th Mixed Brigade was sent to the Estremadura front, now under the command of Ricardo Meléndez Ramos. To cover its losses on the Levante front, it received reinforcements from the 83rd Mixed Brigade. Upon arrival at Puebla de Alcocer, it was located as a reserve for the 28th Division, north of the "Vertice Cabezuela" - near the road that linked Cabeza del Buey with Zarza Capilla. The brigade took part in the republican attacks that tried to cut the nationalist lines in Cabeza del Buey. On September 21, it took over from the 191st Mixed Brigade on the road from Cabeza de Buey to Sancti-Spíritus.

At the beginning of December the 66th Mixed Brigade relieved it of its positions and the 125th MB was sent to Chillón to be subjected to a reorganization. A few weeks later, in January 1939, it participated with the rest of the division in the Battle of Peñarroya, where it remained until the beginning of February. During the fighting, the unit suffered casualties that affected 40% of its troops, so it was withdrawn from the front to be restructured. The brigade took part in no further actions for the remainder of the war.

== Commanders ==
Commanders

- Miguel García Vivancos;
- Antonio Aguilá Collantes;
- Juan Mayordomo Moreno; (Note: Came to command the 28th Division as of August 11, 1938.)
- Ricardo Meléndez Ramos;
- Germán Riera Condal

Commissars

- Juan Tenaguillo Cano

== See also ==
- Ascaso Column
- Mixed Brigades

== Bibliography ==
- Alpert, Michael (2013). The Republican Army in the Spanish Civil War, 1936-1939. Cambridge University Press.
- Álvarez, Santiago (1989). Los comisarios políticos en el Ejército Popular de la República (in Spanish). Ediciós do Castro.
- Engel, Carlos (1999). Historia de las Brigadas Mixtas del Ejército Popular de la República (in Spanish). Madrid: Almena. ISBN 84-922644-7-0.
- Maldonado, José María (2007). El frente de Aragón. La Guerra Civil en Aragón (1936-1938) (in Spanish). Mira Editores.
- Zaragoza, Cristóbal (1983). Ejército Popular y Militares de la República, 1936-1939 (in Spanish). Barcelona: Ed. Planeta.
