= Aguiluchos Column =

Republican military unit in the Spanish Civil War

- Columna Los Aguiluchos
- Country: Spanish Republic
- Allegiance: FAI
- Branch: Confederal militias
- Type: Militia
- Role: Home defense
- Size: 1,700
- Garrison/HQ: Grañén
- Colors: Red and Black
- Engagements: Spanish Civil War: Aragon front

Commanders
- Notable commanders: • Miguel García Vivancos • Juan García Oliver

The Aguiluchos Column (Spanish: Columna de los Aguiluchos; English: Harriers Column) was the last of the great Catalan anarcho-syndicalist columns. Later, more militias left Catalonia for the front, but they would no longer do so in the form of a column but rather as reinforcement units of the existing columns. This column was supposed to form a large unit - of around 10,000 combatants - but it ended up reinforcing the Ascaso Column as an autonomous column - with about 1,500 militiamen with 200 militiawomen. Organized in the Bakunin barracks in Barcelona, it was sent to the Huesca front on 28 August, with Juan García Oliver and Miguel García Vivancos leading the column.

== History ==
In mid-August, Joan Garcia i Oliver, Gregorio Jover and Miguel García Vivancos began making plans to create a force of between 10,000 and 15,000 anarchists to launch an offensive against the nationalist line on the Aragon front. Garcia i Oliver wanted to take advantage of the call to arms made by the Government, to organize an anarchist army. However, the CNT unions did not agree to a massive mobilization for the front. García Vivancos and Garcia i Oliver were frustrated by the refusal of the unions. But they decided to go ahead with the column, thinking of creating a reinforcement to some column already present in the front. They believed that with the departure of so many troops to the front, the war industry and the then recent collectivizations of companies would be in danger. The CNT's own structure would also be in danger. Thus, they organized the new column outside the Committee of Antifascist Militias.

On 19 August the CNT newspaper in Catalonia, "Solidaridad Obrera", called for volunteers to start joining a new anarchist column that was being organized at the Bakunin barracks. This column would be called the FAI Aguiluchos. "Aguiluchos" (English: Harriers) in the anarchist terminology of the time symbolized young anarchists like the Libertarian Youth. Only young men between the ages of 16 and 18 were recruited to join this column. On 28 August the formation of the column was completed, it left the Bakunin barracks and went to parade to Via Laietana, where the CNT-FAI headquarters was located. The column started with about 1,500 militiamen, including more than 200 women. These were young women, predominantly between the ages of 16 and 20. Later the column would receive some reinforcements until reaching 2,000 troops.

The famous anarchist maquis Quico Sabaté took part in the Aguiluchos Column, and joined the column with his brother José. They participated in the column and later in the 126th Mixed Brigade of the 28th Division.

== See also ==
- Anarchism in Spain

== Bibliography ==
- Juan García Oliver. The echo of the steps. FELLA, La Rosa de Foc, CNT-Cataluña, Barcelona 2008. ISBN 978-84-612-5003-5
- Francisco Javier Navarro Navarro. To the revolution for culture: cultural practices and sociability. University of Valencia, 2004.
- Vicente Guarner. Catalonia in the Spanish War (Ed. G. del Toro)
- Martínez de Sas, María Teresa et al .: Biographical Dictionary of the Movement to Work in Catalan Countries , Ed. Publicacions de L'Abadia de Montserrat. ISBN 9788484152439
- Julián Casanova, "Anarchism and revolution in rural Aragonese society, 1936-1938". 2006, Review. 978-84-8432-842-1

== Filmography ==
- Libertarias , 2004, Spain. Feature film by Vicente Aranda
- Harriers of the FAI for the lands of Aragon (Report No. 3). Another original title: La Toma de Siétamo . 1936, Spain

== See also ==
- Spanish Civil War
- Spanish Revolution of 1936
- Battle of Teruel
