= Cabeza del Buey =

- Municipality
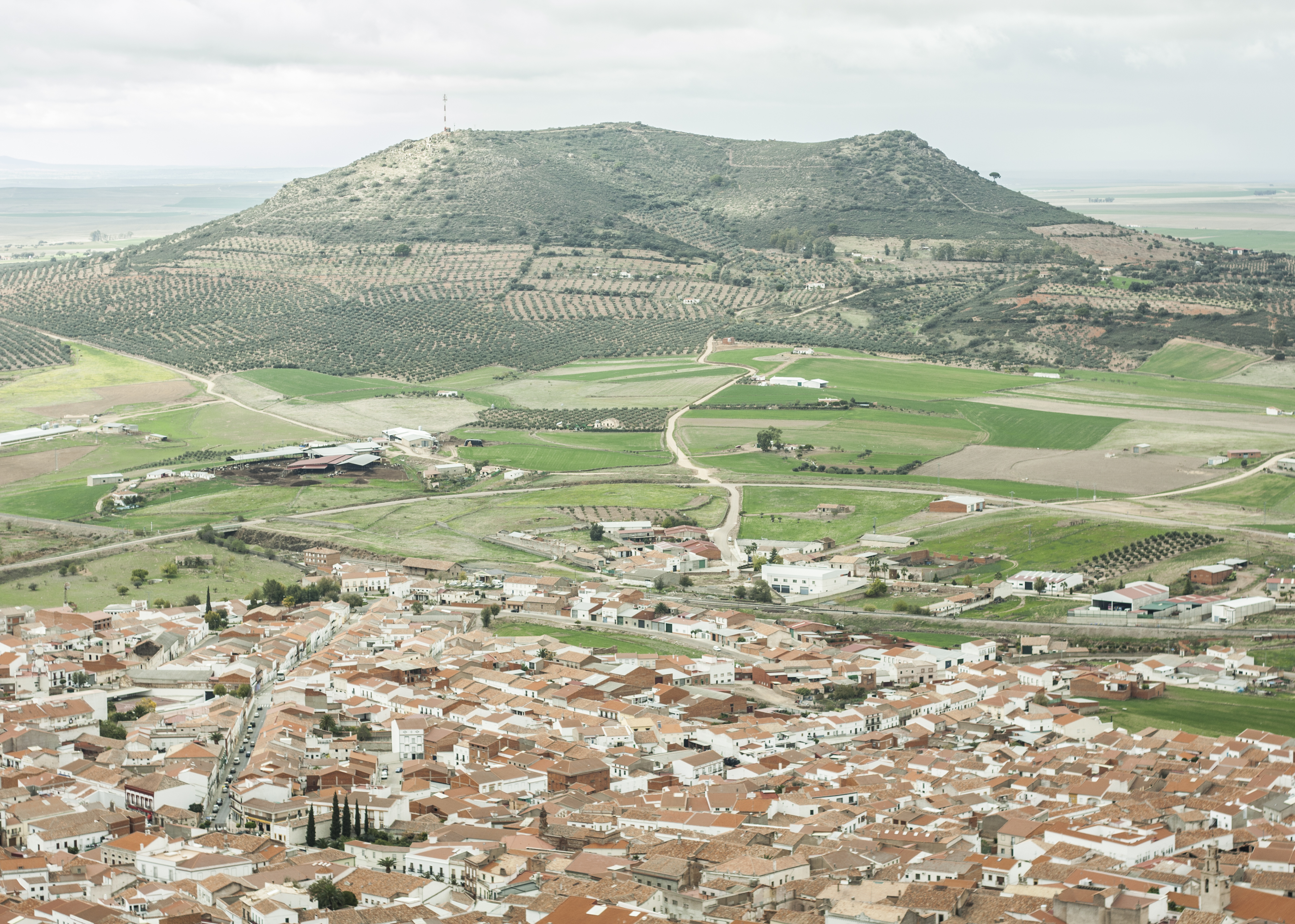

- Coat of arms

- Location of Cabeza del Buey within Extremadura Cabeza del Buey (Spain)
- Coordinates: 38°44′16″N 5°13′10″W
- Country: Spain
- Autonomous community: Extremadura
- Province: Badajoz
- Comarca: La Serena

Government
  - Alcaldesa: Ana Belén Valls Muñoz

Area
  - Total: 475.06 km^{2} (183.42 sq mi)

Population (2025-01-01)
  - Total: 4,489
  - Density: 9.449/km^{2} (24.47/sq mi)
- Time zone: UTC+1 (CET)
  - Summer (DST): UTC+2 (CEST)
- Website: Ayuntamiento de Cabeza del Buey

Cabeza del Buey (Spanish pronunciation: [kaˈβeθa ðel ˈβwej]; lit. 'Bull's Head') is a Spanish municipality in the province of Badajoz, Extremadura. According to the 2014 census, the municipality has a population of 5,234 inhabitants.

== See also ==
- List of municipalities in Badajoz
