= Ricardo Sanz García =

Valencian militant (1898–1986)

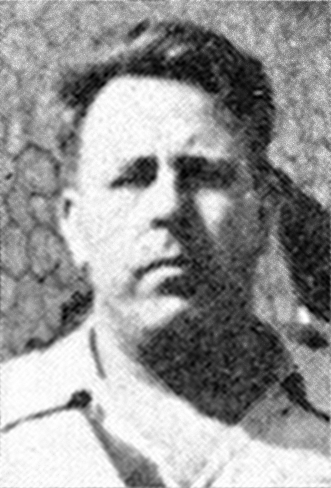
- Sanz in 1936
- Born: 5 November 1898; Canals, Valencia, Spain
- Died: 25 October 1986 (aged 87); Valencia, Spain
- Military career
- Allegiance: Spanish Republic
- Service: Confederal militias (1936–1937); Spanish Republican Army (1937–1939)
- Service years: 1936–1939
- Commands: Durruti Column (1936–1937); 26th Division (1937–1939)
- Conflicts: Spanish Civil War

Ricardo Sanz García (1898–1986) was a Valencian anarchist militant. A member of Buenaventura Durruti's insurgent group Los Solidarios, Sanz participated in the anarchist armed struggle against the Spanish monarchy and the dictatorship of Primo de Rivera. Following the proclamation of the Second Spanish Republic, he became a leader of the Confederación Nacional del Trabajo (CNT) and Federación Anarquista Ibérica (FAI) in Catalonia. During the Spanish Civil War, Sanz oversaw the training of the confederal militias and went on to lead the Durruti Column following the death of its namesake. In command of the Aragon front, he attempted multiple unsuccessful offensives against Zaragoza, but was either hampered by severe weather or held back by the Ministry of Defence. After the militarisation of the Column, he continued to command it as the reorganised 26th Division, but came into conflict with Communist-aligned commanders of the Spanish Republican Army. After the Nationalist victory in the Aragon Offensive, Sanz fled to France, where he remained for the rest of his life.

== Biography ==
=== Early life and militant activism ===
Ricardo Sanz García was born in Valencia in 1898. In 1916, he moved to Barcelona, where he worked in textiles, joined the Confederación Nacional del Trabajo (CNT), and was imprisoned for two years. Sanz joined the militant anarchist group Los Solidarios. Formed by Buenaventura Durruti and Francisco Ascaso, the small group attacked trains and robbed banks associated with the Rio Tinto mining company, in actions that Sanz participated in.

With the rise of the dictatorship of Primo de Rivera, the CNT decentralised into a series of local and regional groups. With the backing of the syndicate in Blanes, Manuel Buenacasa established a newspaper El Productor, which called for anarchists to drop their support for the CNT and establish a "loose party structure". This proposal received support from anarchists throughout Spain, as well as many exiles in France, mostly from the younger generation. Sanz was one of the only "experienced revolutionaries" left in Spain and the highest-ranking member of the Solidarios that hadn't yet fled the country. But before Buenacasa could make contact with him, he was arrested while trying to break three anarchists out of prison in Zaragoza. To avoid detention, in 1924, Sanz fled to France, where he began smuggling weapons into Catalonia. He was arrested during a smuggling expedition and imprisoned for two years.

Following the proclamation of the Second Spanish Republic, Sanz joined the newly established Federación Anarquista Ibérica (FAI) and became a leader of the CNT in Catalonia. By 1933, members of Nosotros had begun to dissolve into other groups, with Sanz becoming a leader of the "Group A.", along with Jacinto Toryho and Abelardo Iglesias.

=== Militia command ===
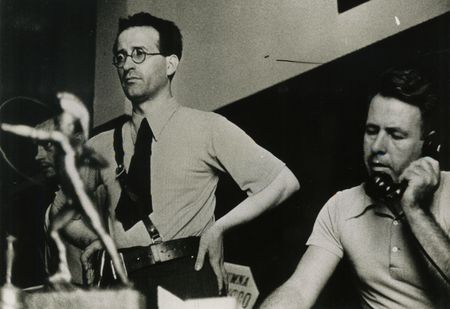
Ricardo Sanz (right) and Diego Abad de Santillán (left), during their organisation of militia columns at the Pedralbes barracks

At the outbreak of the Spanish Civil War, Sanz was one of the main organisers of the confederal militias. Together with Joan Garcia i Oliver, he established the Central Committee of Antifascist Militias of Catalonia (CCMA). He also oversaw the military training of new anarchist militias, at the barracks in Pedralbes. Following Buenaventura Durruti's death, the CNT began looking for a successor to command his militia column. Juan García Oliver was the first choice, but he declined, in order to continue his work as Minister of Justice. In November 1936, Sanz was chosen to take over commander of the Durruti Column.

Seeking to avenge Durruti's death, on the night of 21 December 1936, Sanz led the column into an offensive against the Nationalist-held city of Zaragoza. Their advance was slowed by a snowstorm, which delayed them from reaching the city and isolated the anarchist insurgents that were launching an uprising in the city; more than two hundred insurgents died in the street fights and another hundred were executed on Christmas Day, with only a few managing to link up with the militia column. They held parts of the city until New Year's Day of 1937, when they were forced to retreat, helping more than two thousand anarchists escape the city.

They began making plans for another offensive against the city a few weeks later, with anarchist spies and saboteurs infiltrating the city in order to stage an attack, which was scheduled for 24 January 1937. Despite the preparations, the Ministry of Defence ordered the offensive be cancelled, convinced that the militia lacked the sufficient means to succeed. Sanz protested the decision, as over 5,000 guerrillas were in Zaragoza at that moment, waiting for the militia to attack. But without the prestige of his predecessor, he was unable to reverse the decision and the anarchists' planned January offensive was abandoned. In anarchist historiography, it's remembered as the last major anarchist offensive in Aragon, one that "Madrid did not want them to win".

=== Conflict and militarisation ===
Sanz continued to face difficulties on the Aragon front, as sectarian disputes between the anarchists and the Unified Socialist Party of Catalonia (PSUC) overtook meetings of the Republican command staff. Internal disputes were exacerbated when the Ministry of Defence transferred more Communists to the Aragon front, although Sanz was able to veto the transfer of the International Brigades, who he denounced as "adventurers imposed upon the Spanish people against their will."

The intervention of the Ministry of Defence reached its height over the subsequent months, after it was decreed that the militias be militarised into the Spanish Republican Army, a decision that many anarchists fiercely opposed. After the fall of Málaga in February 1937, the communists consolidated control over the government, while their own military campaigns collapsed. With the end of the militia system in sight, in April 1937, Sanz ordered one last offensive against the cities of Zaragoza and Huesca, hoping a victory would delay their militarisation. But after ten days of assaults, the Nationalists, now equipped with Italian and German equipment, managed to repel the anarchists, who themselves faced endemic supply issues.

Sanz subsequently oversaw the column's reorganisation into the 26 Division, which was made up of the 120th, 121st and 199th Mixed Brigades. In the wake of the May Days, the anarchists lost what remained of their influence in the Republican command. Sanz's 26th Division was joined at the front by Enrique Lister's 11th Division, which began attacking the CNT's local institutions and breaking up the Aragonese communes, causing a conflict to break out between the two divisions. The 26th Division was dissolved into the ranks of the Eastern Army, commanded by Sebastián Pozas, who broke up the Regional Defence Council of Aragon. José Ignacio Mantecón, the newly appointed military governor of Aragon, was disliked by Sanz, who called him a señorito (little lord).

=== Later life ===
Having failed to achieve his objective of capturing Zaragoza, after the Nationalist victory in the Aragon Offensive, Sanz fled to France and was interned in a number of French concentration camps. He lived the remainder of his life in France, where he wrote his memoirs. Sanz died in 1986.

== Works ==
- El sindicalismo y la politica: los "Solidarios" y "Nosotros" (Tolosa, 1966)
- Los que fuimos a Madrid: Columna Durruti (Tolosa, 1969)
- Figuras de la revolución española (1972)

== Bibliography ==
- Kern, Robert (1978). Red Years/Black Years: A Political History of Spanish Anarchism, 1911–1937. Philadelphia: Institute for the Study of Human Issues. ISBN 0-915980-83-5.
- Salvadó, Francisco J. Romero (2013). "Sanz García, Ricardo". Historical Dictionary of the Spanish Civil War. Rowman & Littlefield. p. 309. ISBN 978-0-8108-5784-1.
