= Miguel García Vivancos =

Spanish painter

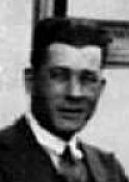
- Born: 9 April 1895; Mazarrón, Murcia, Spain
- Died: 23 January 1972 (aged 76); Córdoba, Andalusia, Spain
- Military career
- Allegiance: CNT
- Service: Confederal militias (1936-1937); Spanish Republican Army (1937-1939)
- Service years: 1936-1939
- Units: Harriers Column (1936-1937), 125th Mixed Brigade (1937), 25th Division (1937), 29th Division (1937-1938), 24th Division (1938)
- Conflicts: Spanish Civil War: Battle of Belchite; Battle of Teruel

Signature
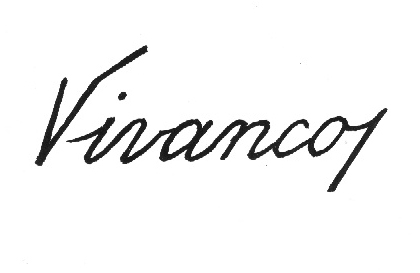

Miguel García Vivancos (19 April 1895 in Mazarrón, Region of Murcia – 23 January 1972 in Córdoba) was a Spanish Naïve painter and anarchist. He was a member of the National Confederation of Labor (Spanish: Confederación Nacional del Trabajo, CNT), during the Spanish Civil War he commanded several military units. With the defeat of the Republic he went into exile, where he developed a career as a painter. He was artistically known by his second surname.

== Biography ==
He was born in Mazarrón on 19 April 1895. Apprentice at the arsenal of Cartagena, he went with his widowed mother and brothers to Barcelona. At an early age he joined the anarchist National Labor Confederation (CNT); To actively fight against the gunmen hired by the businessmen to suppress workers' demands, he formed the group "Los Solidarios" together with Buenaventura Durruti, Francisco Ascaso, Juan García Oliver, Gregorio Jover, Ramona Berri and Aurelio Fernández.

During the civil war he commanded the Harriers Column that left Barcelona to fight in the front of Huesca. García Vivancos agreed with the militarization of the militias and tried to cooperate with the communists. Later he commanded the 125th Mixed Brigade and the 25th Division, intervening in the battles of Belchite and Teruel. In May 1938 he was promoted to the rank of lieutenant colonel. During the rest of the war, he also held command of the 29th Division - a former POUM militia - and the 24th Division — replacing Antonio Ortiz Ramírez.

He fled at the end of the civil war to France, where he was held in 1940 in the Vernet concentration camp. He remained there at the beginning of the Nazi occupation, before being liberated by the resistance and joining it. After the end of World War II, he worked in many different trades . One day he began to paint scenes and landscapes of Paris on handkerchiefs to sell to American soldiers. This is how he discovered his talent for painting by beginning to capture his works in oil on canvas.

In the year 1947 he met Picasso who welcomed him warmly as he had heard of his actions during the civil war. Picasso became interested in his painting and sought out the dealer María Cuttoli to make it known. In 1948 he held his first exhibition in Paris at the Mirador gallery. He made a name for himself, and in one of his exhibitions, André Breton dedicated a few lines to it, saying:

The elf that Vivancos shows in his painting is the gift of those who take pleasure in discovering art for themselves; It is the invirginal consecration of life, perhaps defeated in advance, but together with the possibility of restarting it each time.

— André Breton, 1948

Seriously ill, he returned to Spain, where he died in Córdoba on 23 January 1972.

== Bibliography ==
- Alexander, Robert J. (1999). The Anarchists in the Spanish Civil War. Janus Publishing Company Lim. pp. 744, 1100. ISBN 978-1-85756-412-9.
- Alpert, Michael (2013). The Republican Army in the Spanish Civil War, 1936-1939. Cambridge University Press. pp. 142, 334. ISBN 978-1-107-02873-9.
- Álvarez, José (2010). Vivancos (in Spanish). Córdoba: Fundación Rafael Botí.
- Arnáiz, José Manuel (1993). Cien años de pintura en España y Portugal (1830-1930) (in Spanish). Ediciones Antiquaria.
- Bihalji-Merin, Oto (1975). Die Naiven der Welt (in German). Wiesbaden: R. Löwit Verlag.
- Llorens, Vicente; Aznar, Manuel (2006). Estudios y ensayos sobre el exilio republicano de 1939 (in Spanish). Sevilla: Renacimiento. ISBN 978-1-107-02873-9.
- Márquez, José Manuel; Gallardo, Juan José (1999). Ortiz: general sin Dios ni amo (in Spanish). Hacer Editorial.
- M. Lorenzo, César (1972). Los Anarquistas españoles y el poder 1868-1969 (in Spanish). Ruedo Ibérico.
- Roca, Juan Manuel; Álvarez, Iván Darío (2008). Diccionario anarquista de emergencia (in Spanish). Editorial Norma.
- Téllez, Antonio (1992). Sabaté. Guerrilla urbana en España (1945-1960) (in Spanish). Virus. ISBN 9788460418610.
- Vallejo-Nágera, Juan Antonio (1975). Naifs españoles contemporáneos (in Spanish). Madrid: Mas Actual, S.A. de Ediciones.
- Zueras Torrens, Francisco (1990). La gran aportación cultural del exilio español (in Spanish). Diputación provincial de Córdoba.
- "73. Año IV". Revista Bellas Artes (in Spanish) (21). Madrid. March 1973.
