= Louis Lecoin =

French author and anarcho-pacifist (1888–1971)

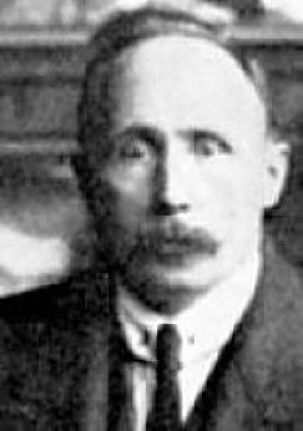
- Born: 30 September 1888; Saint-Amand-Montrond, Cher, France
- Died: 23 June 1971 (aged 82)

Louis Lecoin (30 September 1888 – 23 June 1971) was a French anarcho-pacifist. He was at the center of the foundation of the Union pacifiste de France.

== Biography ==
Louis Lecoin was born into a very poor family in Saint-Amand-Montrond in the Cher département. His parents were illiterate (he himself did not gain any qualification beyond the basic certificat d'études). He became a proof-reader at a printing press after having tried out being a manual labourer, gardener, cement worker and a beggar. He had a life partnership with a worker for the PTT, Marie Morand, which lasted until her death in 1958. Over the course of his life he edited several publications: Ce qu’il faut dire, Le Libertaire, Défense de l’Homme and Liberté.

He spent twelve years of his life in prison for his ideas. In October 1910, a young recruit, he received the order with his regiment to break a railway workers' strike. He refused, which got him 6 months in prison. Demobilized in 1912, he went to Paris and, having made contact with anarchist circles, he became secretary of the Fédération anarchiste communiste.

During World War I, he was called before a military court for insubordination on the 18 December 1917. He was sentenced to 5 years of military prison as well as 18 months of prison for disturbing public order, without being given the opportunity to defend himself.

In 1921, at the congress of the CGT in Lille, faced with strong-arm threats from the leadership, he fired his revolver in the air so that the revolutionary syndicalists could express themselves.

He fought two battles which were to have repercussions throughout the entire world.

- The first was to defend three militants from the Spanish Confederación Nacional del Trabajo, Buenaventura Durruti, Gregorio Jover and Francisco Ascaso, who were sought by Argentina and Spain. They were accused of having plotted an attack on Alfonso XIII of Spain who had announced he was to visit France. They were arrested in France for carrying banned weapons. Lecoin established a committee on the right to asylum and took control of the Ligue des droits de l'homme. The three men were never extradited.
- The second struggle was in support of Nicola Sacco and Bartolomeo Vanzetti, executed in the United States of America on 23 August 1927. Shortly thereafter Lecoin snuck into a meeting of the American Legion. Despite being followed by the police, he managed to enter disguised as a soldier. Finding a seat in the middle of the meeting, when the president spoke, Lecoin got up and repeated three times "Long live Sacco and Vanzetti". He was then arrested.

After the declaration of World War II, Lecoin penned a tract entitled "Paix immédiate". Because of this he was sent to prison until 1943.

After the war, Lecoin founded the committee to support Garry Davis in introducing a worldwide citizenship. In 1958 Lecoin launched his campaign to create a law for conscientious objectors. Albert Camus participated actively although he did not live to see its conclusion. The government was refusing to keep its promise of 1 June 1961, so Lecoin began a hunger strike, despite being 74 years old. The strike met with initial indifference, but after a few days, Lecoin received important support from the press, particularly from Henri Jeanson of the Canard enchaîné; Jeanson seized the attention of the intellectual class with a resounding "Holà ! Les Grandes Gueules ! Laisserez-vous mourir Louis Lecoin ?" (Hey big-mouths, are you going to let Lecoin die?). Lecoin was sent to hospital by force. On the 21st day, prime minister Georges Pompidou sent him a promise that a legislative bill was about to be submitted to the Parlement. It was not until the next day that Lecoin broke his fast. In August 1963, with the bill still not voted into law, Lecoin threatened to recommence his hunger strike. The government yielded, the law was promulgated on 23 December 1963 and all objectors were freed.

Though a committee developed to recommend Lecoin for 1964 Nobel Peace Prize, he retracted his name to support (eventual laureate) Martin Luther King Jr.'s candidacy.

== Bibliography ==
- Louis Lecoin De prison en prison (édité à compte d'auteur, Paris), 1946
- Louis Lecoin, Le cours d'une vie (édité à compte d'auteur, Paris), 1965
- Louis Lecoin, La Nation face à l'armée
- Louis Lecoin, Écrits de Louis Lecoin (Union pacifiste, Paris), 1974
- Sylvain Garel, Louis Lecoin et le mouvement anarchiste (Volonté anarchiste, Fresnes), 1982.
- Jean-Claude Lemonnier, Louis Lecoin combattant de la Paix (Anima, Saint-Amand-Montrond), 1991.

== See also ==
- List of peace activists
