= 28th Division (Spain) =

- 28.ª División
- Active: 28 April 1937 - 27 March 1939
- Disbanded: 27 March 1939
- Country: Spanish Republic
- Allegiance: Republican faction
- Branch: Spanish Republican Army
- Type: Infantry
- Size: Division

Commanders
- 1937-1938: Gregorio Jover
- 1938-1939: Juan Mayordomo Moreno

The 28th Division was one of the divisions of the Spanish Republican Army that were organized during the Spanish Civil War on the basis of the Mixed Brigades. It was deployed on the Aragon and Segre fronts.

== History ==
The unit was created in April 1937 from the old Ascaso Column, commanded by the anarchist Gregorio Jover. The new 28th Division, in addition to the forces coming from the «Ascaso» column, had also absorbed the remains of other militia forces and became composed of 125th, 126th and 127th mixed brigades; continued under Jover's command.

The 28th Division remained on the Aragon front for much of the war. In June 1937 it took part in the unsuccessful Huesca Offensive, and at the end of August one of its units - the 127th MB - took part in the Zaragoza Offensive. In February 1938 it took part in the Battle of Alfambra. During the subsequent offensive on the Aragon front, the unit undertook several withdrawals in the face of enemy pressure. It took part in the Levante Offensive integrated in the 13th Army Corps, being later transferred to the Estremadura front, where it participated in the Battle of Merida pocket. After Gregorio Jover was promoted to command of the 10th Army Corps, on August 11 Juan Mayordomo Moreno took command of the division. In January 1939, the unit participated in the Battle of Valsequillo, integrated into the Toral Group.

== Commanders ==
Commanders

- Gregorio Jover;
- Juan Mayordomo Moreno

Commissars

- Adolfo Arnal García;
- Pedro Fernández Alonso

Chief of Staff

- Ramón Rodríguez Bosmediano

== Battles ==
Dates	Attached Army Corps	Integrated Mixed Brigades	Battle front
May–June 1937	10th	125th, 126th and 127th	Aragón
December 1937	21st	125th, 126th and 127th	Aragón
April 1938	13th	125th, 126th and 127th	Levante
August 1938	7th	125th, 126th and 127th	Estremadura

== See also ==
- Spanish Republican Army
- List of Spanish Republican divisions

== Bibliography ==
- Alpert, Michael (2013). The Republican Army in the Spanish Civil War, 1936-1939. Cambridge University Press.
- Álvarez, Santiago (1989). Los comisarios políticos en el Ejército Popular de la República (in Spanish). Ediciós do Castro.
- Casanova, Julián (1985). Anarquismo y revolución en la sociedad rural aragonesa, 1936-1938 (in Spanish). Siglo XXI Editores.
- Engel, Carlos (1999). Historia de las Brigadas Mixtas del Ejército Popular de la República (in Spanish). Madrid: Almena. ISBN 84-922644-7-0.
- Gabriel, Pere (2011). Historia de la UGT IV. Un sindicalismo en guerra (1936-1939) (in Spanish). Siglo XXI de España Editores.
- Navarro, Ramón Juan (2010). Resistir es vencer. El frente de Viver en la Guerra Civil española (in Spanish). Lulu.com. ISBN 978-1-4466-9664-4.
- Maldonado, José M.ª (2007). El frente de Aragón. La Guerra Civil en Aragón (1936–1938) (in Spanish). Mira Editores. ISBN 978-84-8465-237-3.
- Martínez Bande, José Manuel (1985). El Final de la guerra civil (in Spanish). Madrid: San Martín.
- Salas Larrazábal, Ramón (2006). Historia del Ejército Popular de la República. La Esfera de los Libros (in Spanish). ISBN 84-9734-465-0.
- Thomas, Hugh (1976). Historia de la Guerra Civil Española (in Spanish). Barcelona: Círculo de Lectores. ISBN 9788497598323.
- Zaragoza, Cristóbal (1983). Ejército Popular y Militares de la República, 1936-1939 (in Spanish). Barcelona: Planeta.
