= Ascaso Column =

Republican military column in the Spanish Civil War

- Columna Ascaso
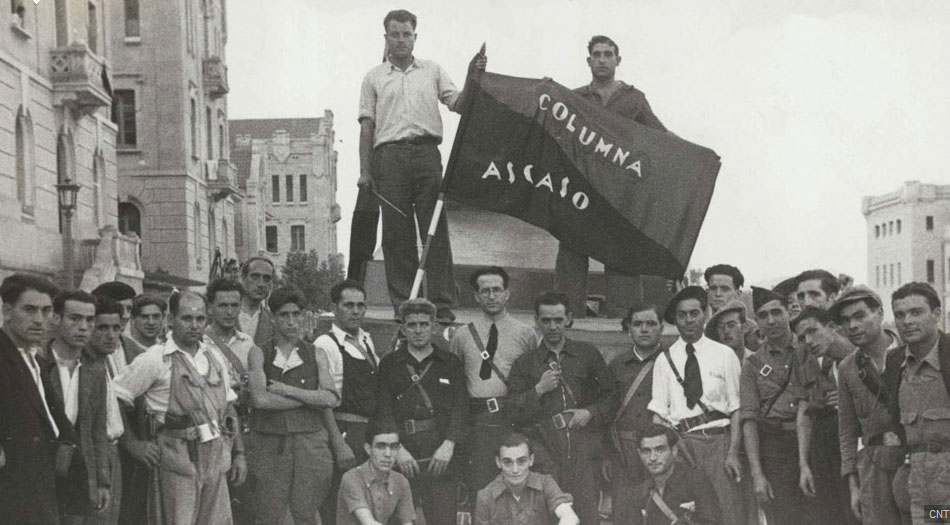
- The Ascaso Column on the day they left for the front in Aragon
- Active: 25 July 1936 - 28 April 1937
- Country: Spanish Republic
- Allegiance: CNT
- Branch: Confederal militias
- Type: Militia
- Role: Home defense
- Size: 2,000
- Garrison/HQ: Huesca
- Engagements: Spanish Civil War: Aragon front

Commanders
- Notable commanders: Cristóbal Alvaldetrecu, Gregorio Jover, Domingo Ascaso

The Ascaso Column was the third column organized in Barcelona at the beginning of the Spanish Civil War. It fought on the Aragon front, in Huesca, where it was joined by a battalion of Italian anti-fascists. During the militarisation of the confederal militias, it was reorganised into the 28th Division.

== History ==
The column was named after Francisco Ascaso, who died fighting the July 1936 military uprising in Barcelona, and was led by his surviving brother Domingo Ascaso, along with Cristóbal Alvaldetrecu. It left for the Aragon front in mid-August, with fewer than the expected number of fighters. The column was stationed south of Huesca, positioned between the Lenin Column and the Harriers Column. There it put out its own newspaper, Mas Alla (English: Beyond).

Shortly after the outbreak of the war, on 17 August 1936, Italian anarchists (led by Camillo Berneri) and socialists (led by Carlo Rosselli) together established an Italian Column in Barcelona. The Italian anti-fascists joined up with the Ascaso Column on the Aragon front, where they faced their first engagement on 28 August 1936, at the Battle of Monte Pelado. By December 1936, the Italians of the Ascaso column had reorganized themselves into two battalions: the anarchists joined the International Battalion, while the socialists joined the Matteotti Battalion; both remaining affiliated with the Ascaso column.

Command of the column was later taken by Gregorio Jover, who also commanded its successor, the 28th Division of the Spanish Republican Army. Domingo Ascaso himself abandoned the unit after its militarisation. He and fellow Ascaso column fighter Camillo Berneri were found dead following the May Days.

== See also ==
- Anarchism in Spain

== Bibliography ==
- Alexander, Robert J. (1999). Anarchists in the Spanish Civil War. Janus Publishing. ISBN 1-85756-400-6.
- Casanova, Julian (2004) [1997]. Anarchism, the Republic and Civil War in Spain: 1931–1939. Routledge. ISBN 0-203-02280-7.
