= Gregorio Jover =

Spanish anarcho-syndicalist (1891-1964)

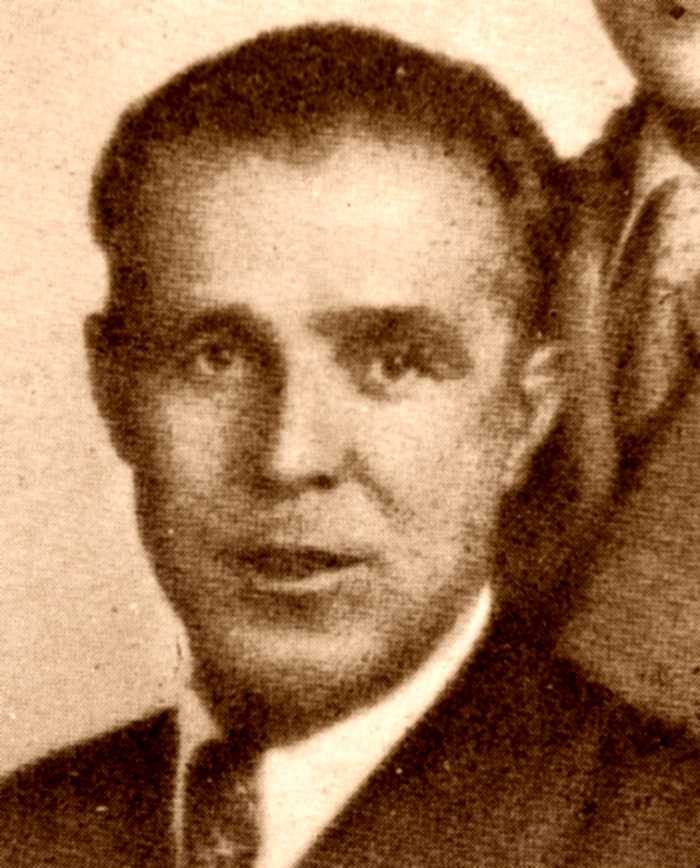
- Born: Gregorio Jover Cortés; 25 October 1891; Teruel, Aragon, Spain
- Died: 22 March 1964 (aged 72); Mexico
- Military career
- Allegiance: CNT-FAI
- Service: Confederal militias (1936–1937), Spanish Republican Army (1937–1939)
- Service years: 1936–1939
- Rank: Lieutenant Colonel
- Units: Ascaso Column (1936–1937), 28th Division (1937–1938), 10th Army Corps (1938–1939)
- Conflicts: Spanish Civil War; Aragon Offensive; Battle of Segre; Catalonia Offensive

Gregorio Jover Cortés (Teruel, 25 October 1891 – Mexico, 22 March 1964) was an Aragonese anarcho-syndicalist and a member of the CNT during the first third of the 20th century. During the Spanish Civil War he was commander of the Ascaso Column and later the militarized 28th Division, which fought on the Aragon front.

== Biography ==
=== Early years ===
As a child he emigrated to Valencia, where he joined socialist and later anarchist youth organizations. Around 1911, after completing military service as a conscript, he again emigrated to Barcelona, where he worked as a carpenter, joining the corresponding CNT union. Persecuted for his activism, he took refuge in Valencia for a time, and then returned to Barcelona, where he was elected delegate of the Catalan Wood Union, although he was also active in the Los Valencianos group. On 12 August 1923 he took part in the regional congress of the CNT held in Manresa, rejecting the post of secretary offered to him because he was declared illiterate.

With the dictatorship of Primo de Rivera increased the repression against the labor movement as groups of gunmen, organized by the Sindicatos Libres, began to mortally attack the most exposed union activists. As a means of defense, Jover helped found the illegalist direct action group Los Solidarios, organized in independent cells in defense and support of armed with the group of Spanish anarchists of the CNT-FAI. With Buenaventura Durruti, he took part in organizing the assassination of the prime minister Eduardo Dato e Iradier (8 March 1921), although he did not take part directly in the action. It was during one of these "operations" that on 24 March 1924, Jover was arrested in Barcelona, but managed to escape and go into exile in Paris together with Francisco Ascaso, Buenaventura Durruti and most of the militiamen of Los Solidarios. There he worked in a mattress factory and turned down an offer to become a factory foreman. He was also one of the organizers of the failed expedition to Bera (7 November 1924) and the attempted assault on the Drassanes barracks (24 November 1924). Meanwhile, in 1923 and 1924, his partner Nieves Castella had two children, Emma and Liberto.

In order to avoid expulsion from France, along with Buenaventura Durruti and Francisco Ascaso he emigrated to Latin America, where he created another illegalist group Los Errantes, which organized the first expropriation robbery in the country's history. The group returned to Paris in 1926. In 1927 Jover took part in the organization of the assassination attempt on Alfonso XIII, but despite the order of summons and search, he managed to escape arrest. In 1931, with the proclamation of the Second Spanish Republic, he returned to Barcelona and rejoined the CNT.

From November 1932 he was a member of the committee of the Barcelona Metallurgical Union. As a member of the Nosotros group, he was the protagonist of many anti-capitalist direct actions and several uprisings, which cost him some periods of imprisonment.

=== Spanish Civil War ===
After the outbreak of the Spanish Civil War in July 1936, he quickly joined the Confederal militias and went on to lead the Ascaso Column in its advance from Barcelona to the Aragón front, also participating in the politics of the towns nearby, where they were able to organize their libertarian ideas in practice. Jover's column, together with other militias, headed towards Huesca, establishing positions around the city while besieging it.

After the militarization of the militias decreed by the republican government, in 1937 he went on to lead the 28th Division, which fought on the front of Aragon, in Teruel, in the Levante and in Estremadura. In May 1938 he was promoted to the rank of lieutenant colonel. From the spring of that year he was in command of the 10th Army Corps, fighting on the Segre Front until the fall of Catalonia in January 1939.

=== Exile ===
Exiled to France, Jover was arrested on 10 February 1939 in La Guingueta d'Ix on the pretext that he had already been expelled from France twelve years earlier. He was interned for 41 days in Perpignan prison, from which he was released on 4 April after being sentenced to 15 days. He was then sent to Le Vernet concentration camp until 10 July 1939, but thanks to the permission of the sub-prefect of Prades he was granted permission to reside; here he was supported thanks to the monthly subsidies of 2,000 francs sent to him by the Spanish Refugee Evacuation Service (SERE). However, in October 1939, the police again identified him as the Gregorio Jover that was expelled from France in 1925 and on October 18 he was interned again in the Sant Cebrià de Rosselló camp.

The internment made him see that he was suffering a persecution that made his life impossible in France. He then decided to leave for the Americas, before embarking for Santo Domingo and then Mexico. He was elected secretary of the subdelegation of the CNT in Mexico and the Committee on Relations and Aid, on whose behalf in 1945 he requested the entry of the CNT into the Spanish Republican government in exile. Gregorio Jover Cortés died in Mexico on 22 March 1964.

== Bibliography ==
- Alexander, Robert J. (2007). The Anarchists in the Spanish Civil War. Vol. II. Janus Publishing Company Lim. ISBN 978-1-85756-412-9.
- Alpert, Michael (2013). The Republican Army in the Spanish Civil War, 1936-1939. Cambridge University Press.
- Baer, James A. (2015). Anarchist Immigrants in Spain and Argentina. University of Illinois Press. ISBN 978-0-252-03899-0.
- Bayer, Osvaldo (1975). Los Anarquistas Expropiadores (in Spanish).
- Enzensberger, Hans Magnus (1977). Der kurze Sommer der Anarchie Suhrkamp (in German). Frankfurt am Main.
- Goldman, Emma; Porter, David (2007). Vision on Fire: Emma Goldman on the Spanish Revolution. AK Press.
- Gómez, Esteban C. (2002). El eco de las descargas. Adiós a la esperanza republicana (in Spanish). ESCEGO.
- Maldonado, José M.ª (2007). El frente de Aragón. La Guerra Civil en Aragón (1936–1938) (in Spanish). Mira Editores. ISBN 978-84-8465-237-3.
- Paz, Abel; Gutiérrez Molina, José Luis; Morse, Chuck (2007). Durruti in the Spanish revolution. AK Press.
- Peirats, José (1962). Breve storia del sindacalismo libertario spagnolo (in Italian). Edizioni RL.
- Pagès i Blanch, Pelai (2007). War and Revolution in Catalonia, 1936-1939. Leiden: Brill NV.
- Silingardi, Claudio (1984). Rivoluzio Gilioli: un anarchico nella lotta antifascista (1903-1937) (in Italian). Istituto storico della Resistenza.
- Téllez, Antonio (1996). La Red de Evasión del Grupo Ponzán. Anarquistas en la guerra secreta contra el franquismo y el nazismo (1936-1944) (in Spanish). Barcelona: Editorial Virus.
- Thomas, Hugh (1976). Historia de la Guerra Civil Española (in Spanish). Barcelona: Círculo de Lectores. ISBN 9788497598323.
