= Aragon front =

Front of the Spanish Civil War

- Part of the Spanish Civil War
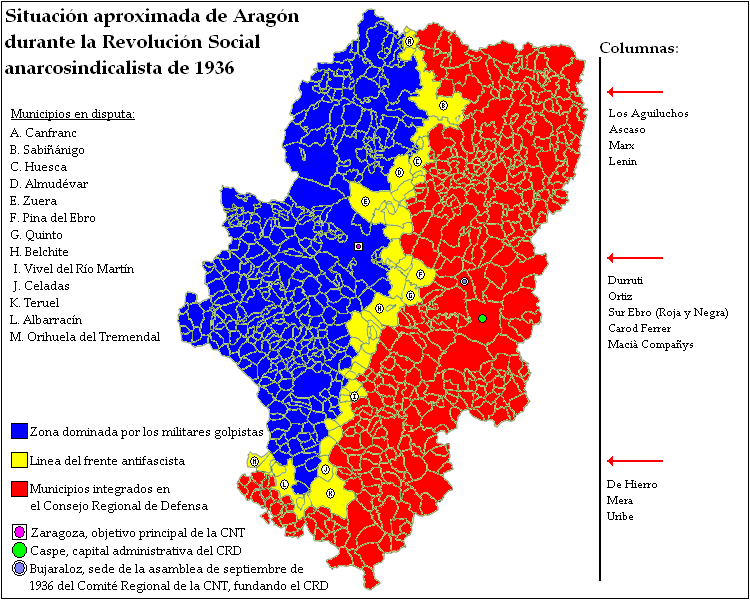
- Aragon, divided between its Nationalist (blue) and Republican (red) zones
Date	July 1936 - August 1938
Location	Aragon, Spain
Result	Nationalist victory

Belligerents
Nationalists	Republicans

Commanders and leaders
Francisco Franco; Miguel Cabanellas; Juan Yagüe	Sebastián Pozas

The Aragon front was the theatre of operations that existed in Aragon during the Spanish Civil War. It held from July 1936 until the spring of 1938, when the Aragon Offensive led to the withdrawal of the Republican Army from the territory.

== Coup ==
During the Spanish coup of July 1936, the only general in Aragon who was clearly committed to the uprising was Miguel Cabanellas, who headed the V Military Region with its headquarters in Zaragoza. On 18 July, Cabanellas ordered the arrest of many leaders of the Republican parties and workers' organisations, in order to neutralise any possible resistance to the coup. The coup itself took in the early hours of 19 July, with Cabanellas proclaiming a state of war and securing the support of Zaragoza's Civil Guard and the Assault Guard for the insurrection. The other two Aragonese capitals, Uesca and Teruel, also fell under the control of the rebels; of the major towns of Aragon, only Jaca offered resistance to the coup, as the local Civil Guards remained loyal to the Republic.

== Establishment of the front ==
Aragon was thereafter divided into two: the Nationalist zone in the west and the Republican zone in the east. The Republican zone was held by columns of the confederal militias, which after suppressing the military uprising in Barcelona, had set out from Catalonia to try to reclaim Aragon. The anarcho-syndicalist militias soon established an autonomous entity to govern the region, the Regional Defence Council of Aragon, which organised numerous agricultural collectives.

Despite some military operations undertaken by the anarcho-syndicalist columns, the front line remained stable during the winter of 1936–1937, with only a few minor territorial changes. During the May Days of 1937, units of the 26th Division gathered in Barbastro with the intention of marching on the Catalan capital, although they ultimately remained in their positions. The 28th and 29th Divisions also considered abandoning the front until the commander of the Republican Air Force in Aragon threatened to bomb them.

== Republican offensives ==
After the riots in Barcelona, the Republican government completed the militarisation of the militias and reorganised them into the Eastern Army under the command of General Sebastián Pozas. As a strategy to distract the Nationalist forces from their Northern offensive, the Republicans undertook several military operations on this front. In June 1937, the Huesca Offensive was launched, which aimed to take the provincial capital, which had been besieged by anarcho-syndicalist militias since the beginning of the war. The Republicans, who had numerical superiority over the rebels, suffered 1,000 casualties in two weeks and ultimately failed to take the city.

After the Battle of Brunete and the dissolution of the Regional Defence Council of Aragon, the Republicans launched a major offensive with the intention of capturing the Aragonese capital and alleviating the situation of the Republicans fighting in the Battle of Santander. In the early hours of 24 August, the Republicans attacked the enemy front at eight different points, managing to break through and isolating some towns (Belchite, Quinto, Codo). By 1 September, the Republican advance in Aragon had been halted by the arrival of Nationalist reinforcements, preventing them from capturing Zaragoza. With the offensive having failed, the Republicans concentrated on the battle of Belchite, which fell to the Republicans on 6 September. After a few isolated actions in October, the front stabilised.

In December, the Republican Army launched a new offensive in Teruel, with the intention of preventing a Nationalist offensive on Madrid. In what became known as the battle of Teruel, the Republicans surrounded the city on 17 December, and from 22 December onwards, they fought throughout the city with the Nationalist garrison. Despite General Francisco Franco's attempts to break the siege, the defenders surrendered on 8 January 1938. Fighting around the devastated city continued for weeks, until 22 February, when the capital of Teruel returned to Nationalist control. Both sides suffered heavy casualties and numerous material losses, but the Republican Army was severely weakened for future operations.

== Nationalist offensive ==
On 7 March 1938, units of Franco's army broke through the Republican front in Aragon, launching a large-scale offensive. By 15 March, the Nationalist vanguard had reached the outskirts of Caspe. By 22 March, all Republican positions between Zaragoza and Huesca had fallen. Despite resistance from some Republican units, the Eastern Army was defeated during the offensive and retreated hastily to Catalonia. On 3 April, Juan Yagüe's Moroccan Army Corps captured Lleida. The 43rd Division, led by Antonio Beltrán Casaña, was isolated in the Bielsa pocket. These troops maintained their resistance in a small portion of territory until June, when they were forced to retreat to the French border.

== Bibliography ==
- Aróstegui, Julio (2006). Por qué el 18 de julio… Y después (in Spanish). Barcelona: Flor del Viento Ediciones. ISBN 84-96495-13-2.
- Thomas, Hugh (2001) [1961]. The Spanish Civil War. New York: Modern Library. ISBN 0-375-75515-2.
