= Almonacid de la Cuba =

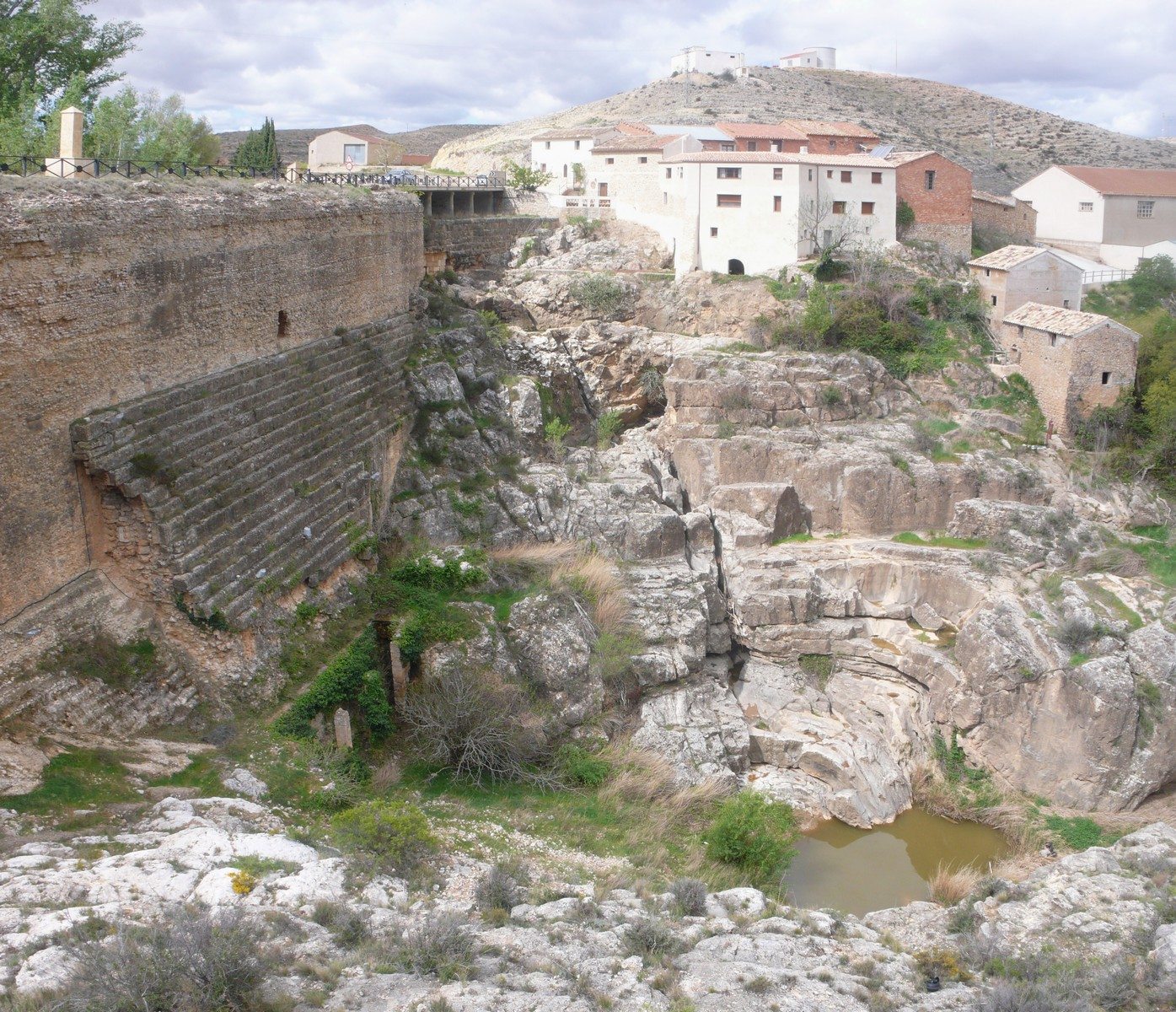

- Flag Coat of arms

- Location within Aragon Location within Spain Location within Europe
- Country: Spain
- Autonomous community: Aragon
- Province: Zaragoza
- Comarca: Campo de Belchite

Area
  - Total: 55 km^{2} (21 sq mi)

Population (2025-01-01)
  - Total: 220
  - Density: 4.0/km^{2} (10/sq mi)
- Time zone: UTC+1 (CET)
  - Summer (DST): UTC+2 (CEST)

Almonacid de la Cuba (Aragonese: Almonecir de la Cuba) is a municipality located in the province of Zaragoza, Aragon, Spain. According to the 2012 census (INE), the municipality has a population of 252.

Lobo Hill, an important Spanish Republican artillery position where the artillery strafed what is now Belchite old town during the Battle of Belchite (1937) is located 2 km (1 mi) to the east of Almonacid de la Cuba. The caves and holes have been preserved and are open to visitors.

== See also ==
- Almonacid de la Cuba Dam
- Lobo Hill
- List of municipalities in Zaragoza
