= Church of San Martín de Tours (Old Town Belchite, Zaragoza) =

Ruined Spanish church

Coordinates: 41.2997°N 0.7455°W

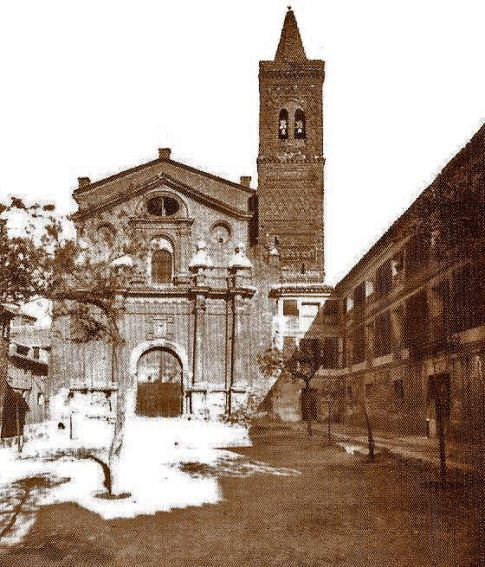
Church of San Martín de Tours, Belchite

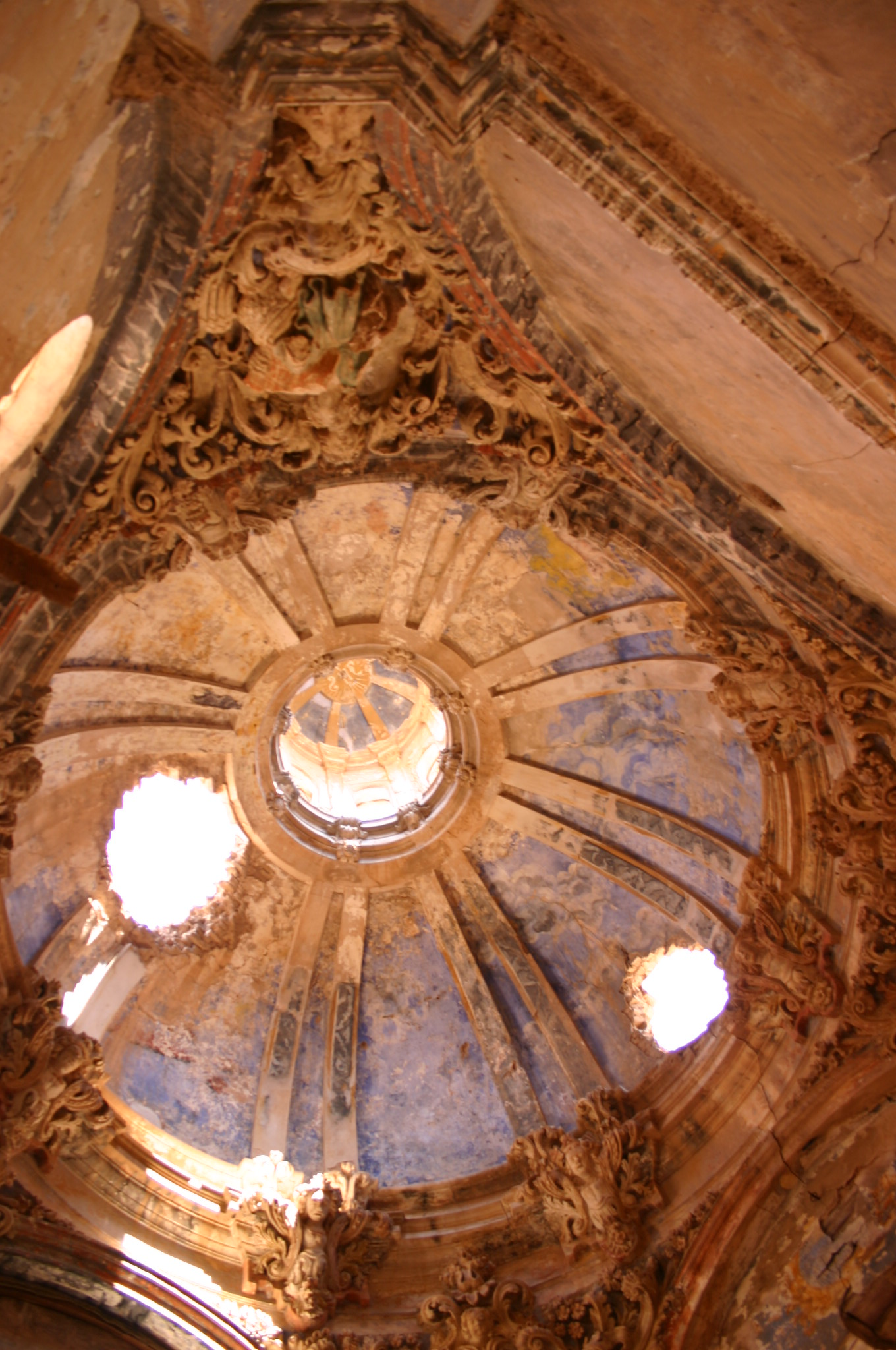
Ruins of the Church

The ruins of the Church of San Martín de Tours in the old village of Belchite in Zaragoza, Spain are a cultural property of a historical place indexed in the Spanish heritage register of Bienes de Interés Cultural under the reference RI-54-0000176. It was built in 1560. The ruins remain a national monument and memorial to the Battle of Belchite. In the battle the church was destroyed. Franco ordered that the ruins be left untouched as a "living" monument of war.

The ruins were featured in Season 3, Episode 5 of television series "The Walking Dead: Daryl Dixon" on October 5, 2025.
