= Fuendetodos =

Town in Spain

- Municipality
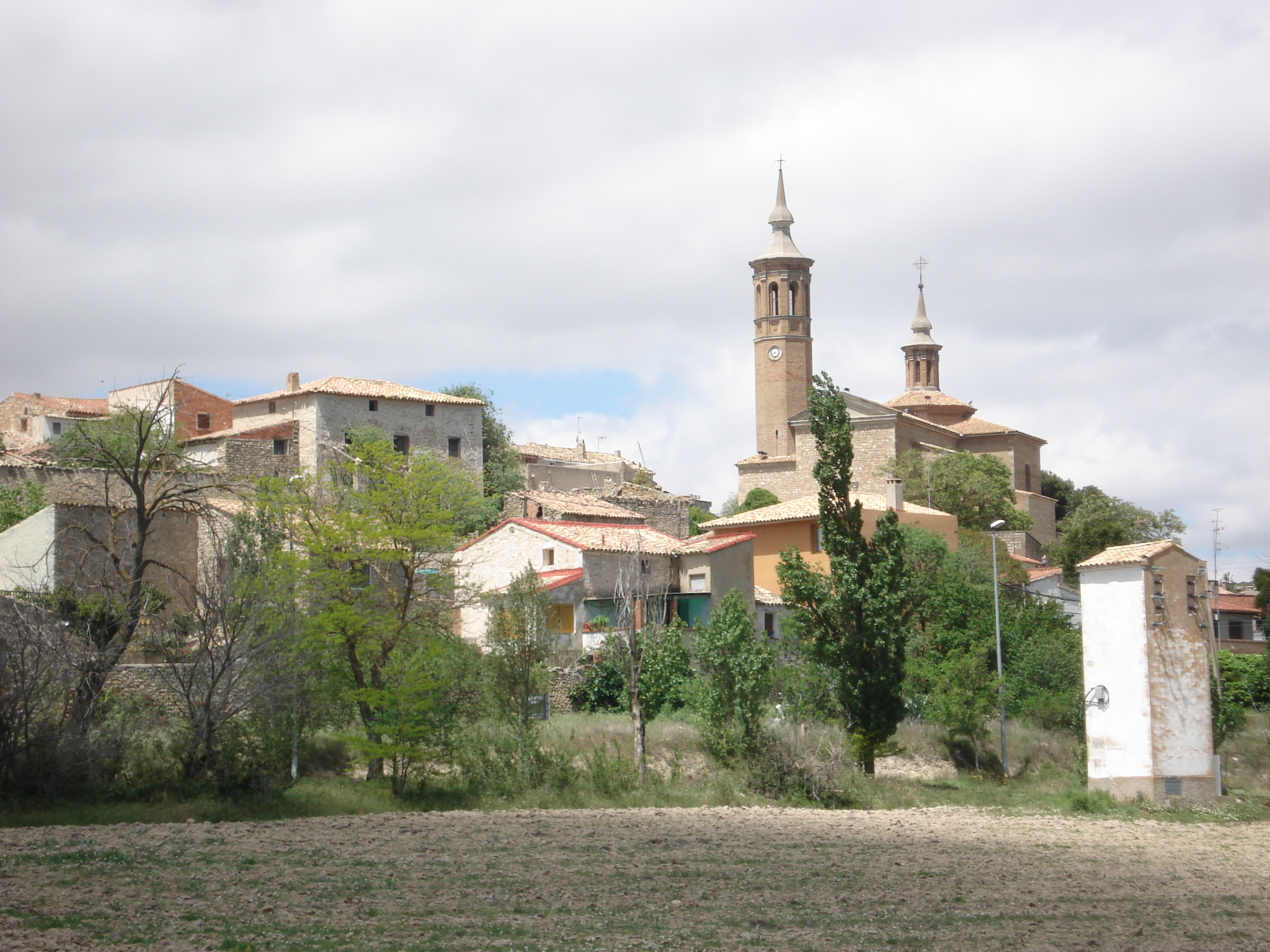

- Location in Spain Fuendetodos (Spain) Fuendetodos (Europe)
- Coordinates: 41°20′36″N 0°51′31″W
- Country: Spain
- Autonomous community: Aragon
- Province: Zaragoza
- Comarca: Campo de Belchite
- Judicial district: Zaragoza

Government
  - Mayor: Joaquín Gimeno Salueña (PSOE)

Area
  - Total: 62.20 km^{2} (24.02 sq mi)
- Elevation: 750 m (2,460 ft)

Population (2025-01-01)
  - Total: 130
  - Density: 2.1/km^{2} (5.4/sq mi)
- Demonym: Fuendetodinos
- Time zone: UTC+1 (CET)
  - Summer (DST): UTC+2 (CEST)
- Climate: Cfb
- Website: Official website

Fuendetodos (Spanish pronunciation: [ˈfwendeˌtoðos]) is a town in the Campo de Belchite comarca (county), in Aragon, Spain, located about 44 kilometers south-east of Zaragoza. As of 2011, it had a population of approximately 178.

The town is associated with painter Francisco de Goya, who was born in Fuendetodos in 1746, and contains a museum dedicated to his work. The town has nearly 25,000 visitors each year.

== Geography ==
Fuendetodos is located in the Aragonese comarca of Campo de Belchite, 44 km to the south of Zaragoza.

It had a population of 178 according to the census of 2011. As of 1 January 2015, the population was estimated to be 144.

== History ==
The town was originally called Fuentedetodos meaning "source of all." Before its foundation in the 12th century as a recolonized village associated with a castle, it was known for its quarries of "caracoleña" stone. This had already been exploited by the Romans who used it in many buildings constructed in nearby Caesaraugusta. From the 14th century, the village was part of the domain of the family of Fernandez de Heredia, known as the Count of Fuentes.

During the Little Ice Age, the traditional industry of ice production flourished.

In 1724, the stones of the ruined castle were used to construct the new Church of Nuestra Señora de la Asunción. Goya was baptised there. He was born in Fuendetodos almost by chance, since his parents were living in Saragossa at that time. His mother was from Fuendetodos and his father was entrusted with the work of gilding the main altarpiece of the new church. He brought along his pregnant wife and they stayed in the town for several months during which time the painter was born. When Goya was born, the Pignatelly family held the title of Count of Fuentes. They provided support for the young artist who made one of his first paintings in Fuendetodos, in the sacristy cupboard. Goya also came to take refuge in Fuendetodos during the Second Siege of Zaragoza in 1809, since he was there making sketches to paint the destruction caused by Napoleonic troops.

In the 1920s, another Spanish painter, Ignacio Zuloaga y Zabaleta, came to learn his idol's birthplace. He found Goya's birth house, bought it, and transformed it into a museum. He repeatedly returned, also helping the town with the donation of a new school.

During the Spanish Civil War, Fuendetodos passed from rebel hands to those of the republicans with the arrival of an anarchist column. The church, being a resistance stronghold, was burnt by the troops, and the altarpiece and Goya's other paintings there were destroyed. Also Goya's birth house was looted and many pieces of the original furniture were lost. Goya's birth house remained a humble tourist place until its renovation in the late 1980s, with the arrival Joaquín Gimeno as mayor of the town. From the 1990s to the present, promotion of his home has turned it into a significant tourist destination.

== Economy ==
The population was traditionally engaged in rainfed agriculture and rearing sheep and goats. For centuries, the stone quarries (caracoleña), exclusive to Fuendetodos, and the ice industry were important economic activities. It had 22 neverones (ice refrigerators) and ice was sold mainly in the market of Zaragoza providing significant revenues to the people. Today its wind power production, and the services associated with tourism (there are 20,000 visitors annually) have become more important.

== Vegetation ==
Much of the town is covered with the Alepo pine. These had belonged to the Counts of Fuentes for centuries, but were later grown on municipal property. Holm oaks dot the hills. Romeral, the Mediterranean scrub, with plenty of black juniper, lavender, sage, and other sclerophyllous shrubs, share the territory with kermes oak. There are deep gorges carved into the hard limestone caused by glacial runoff. These gorges harbor a variety of flora given Fuendetodos' dry environment including: deciduous forests of hackberry, Montpellier maple, turpentine tree can be found as well as five species of fern.

== Points of interest ==
=== Francisco de Goya's birthplace and the Museo del Grabado de Goya ===
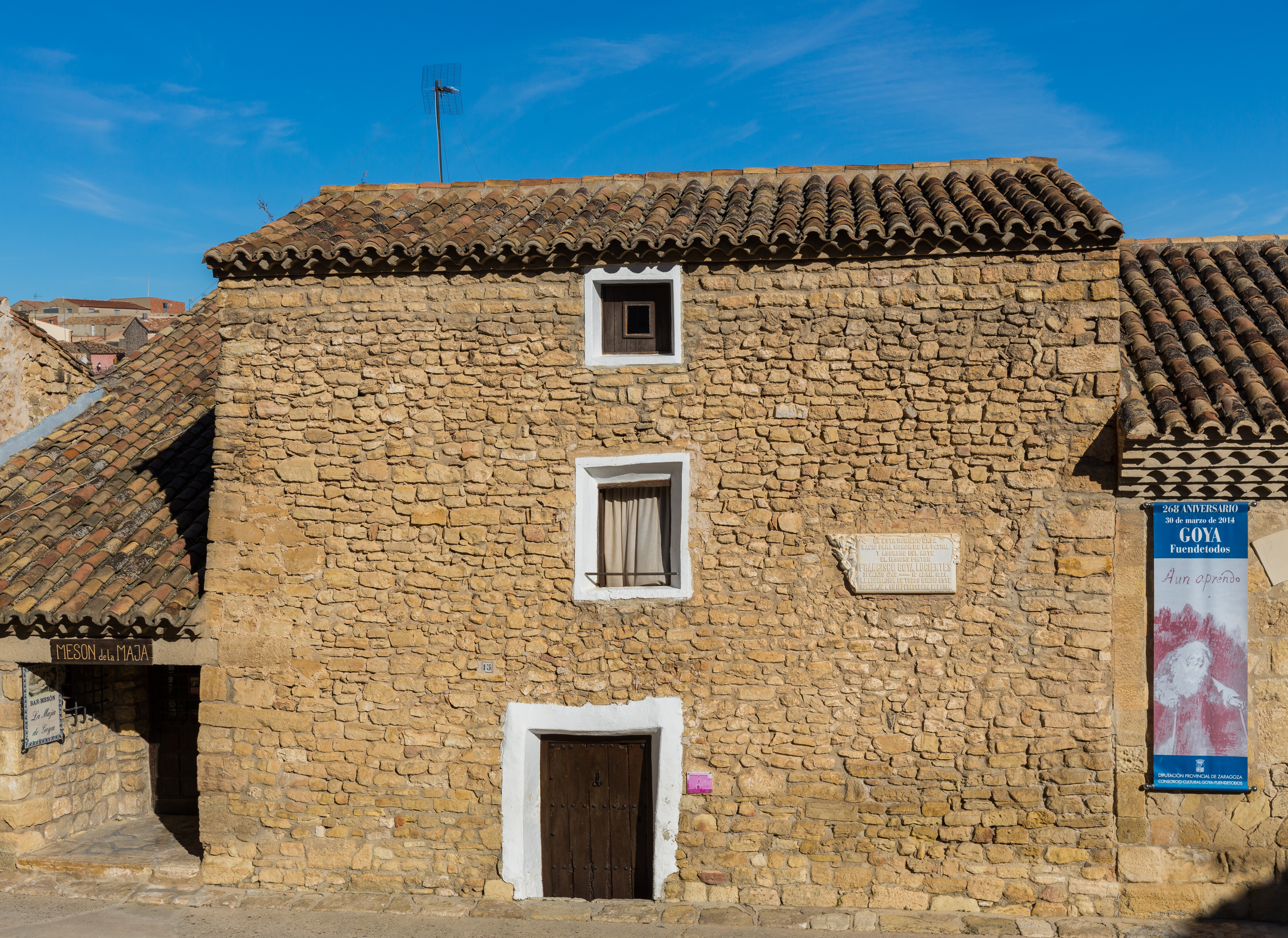
Birth house of Francisco de Goya

The birthplace of the great Spanish painter was built in the early 18th century. A few meters away is the Museo del Grabado de Goya, opened in 1989, which displays Goya's graphic work, including a permanent collection of his work from the series Los Desastres, Los Caprichos, Los Disparates, and La Tauromaquia as well as materials related to printmaking techniques.

=== Fuendeverde ===
The Fuendeverde Nature Space, opened in June 2010, is dedicated to raising awareness of the rich biodiversity of the flora and fauna of Fuendetodos, and the richness and variety of habitats found in the natural environment of the municipality. There is a nature centre with a permanent exhibition and a nature school for workshops in a restored, former farm house constructed over the remains of the castle. There are also guided tours available to surrounding natural hot spots.

=== Neveras ===
Neveras or neverones are stone constructions used for snow storage in winter. This was then transformed into ice blocks to be sold. The ice production industry flourished during the Little Ice Age, reaching its peak in the 18th century. During that period there were 22 working neveras producing ice for the markets in Saragossa. Its construction style is particular to this area, with a 6 m deep and 6m wide pit over which a false cupule was constructed and topped with a specially shaped big stone. Remains of neveras are scattered all around Fuendetodos. Nevera de la Culroya is the only completely preserved example.

- See Ice house (building)

=== Church of Our Lady of the Assumption ===
The church was built in the 18th century, but had to be rebuilt in the 20th century after it was destroyed during the Spanish Civil War (1936–1939). The baptismal font, where Goya was baptized, is still preserved in the church. Before the war, there were paintings in the Sacristy cupboard Goya produced when he was young and the baroque altarpiece gilded by his father. When it was constructed it was the church for the wealthy families, since there was another, smaller church in the "El Calvario" neighbourhood; only some remnants of this church remain.

=== Busts of Goya ===
In Fuendetodos there are two sculptures dedicated to the painter. The first is a bronze bust of Goya on a three-foot-high base of rough, blue jasper extracted from quarries in Codo. This monument was designed in 1920 by Julio Antonio and paid for by Ignacio Zuloaga and his friends in Saragossa. Below the inscription A GOYA are the words: "For the spirit of the immortal artist, that the glory spread around the world, live in the town that gave birth." And below is the inscription: "This monument was erected by Ignacio Zuloaga and his friends. October 19, 1920." The other bust sculpture, designed by José Gonzalvo Vives, was placed in front of Goya's birthplace in 1978.

=== Moorish artwork ===
The town contains the remains of the medieval castle of Fuendetodos. It was built of masonry, after the reconquest by the Christians in the 12th century, and located in the western part of the town. Since being abandoned and then re-used as a source of stone for the construction of the Church of Our Lady of the Assumption in the 18th century, its towers and walls were used by villagers as barns and stables. A farm built in the 1979 over part of the castle is now the Fuendeverde Space of Nature.

=== ARTEfuendetodos Gallery ===
ARTEfuendetodo Gallery is a meeting point for artists and patrons can view works of modern art in its four exhibition rooms.

=== Fuente Vieja ===
The "Old Source" or "Source of everybody" of the legend is still providing some water, but it was restored for its historical interest, since there is now a regular water supply. It has a Gothic arch door that allow visitors to see the artificial cave where the source of water comes from. Inside the cave there is a Romanic older arch.

== Notable people ==
- Francisco Goya (1746–1828), artist

== See also ==
- List of municipalities in Zaragoza
