= Campo de Belchite =

- Comarca
- Flag Coat of arms

- Coordinates: 40°50′N 0°48′W
- Country: Spain
- Autonomous community: Aragon
- Province: Zaragoza

Area
  - Total: 1,043.8 km^{2} (403.0 sq mi)

Population
  - Total: 5,282
  - Density: 5.060/km^{2} (13.11/sq mi)
- Time zone: UTC+1 (CET)
  - Summer (DST): UTC+2 (CEST)
- Largest municipality: Belchite

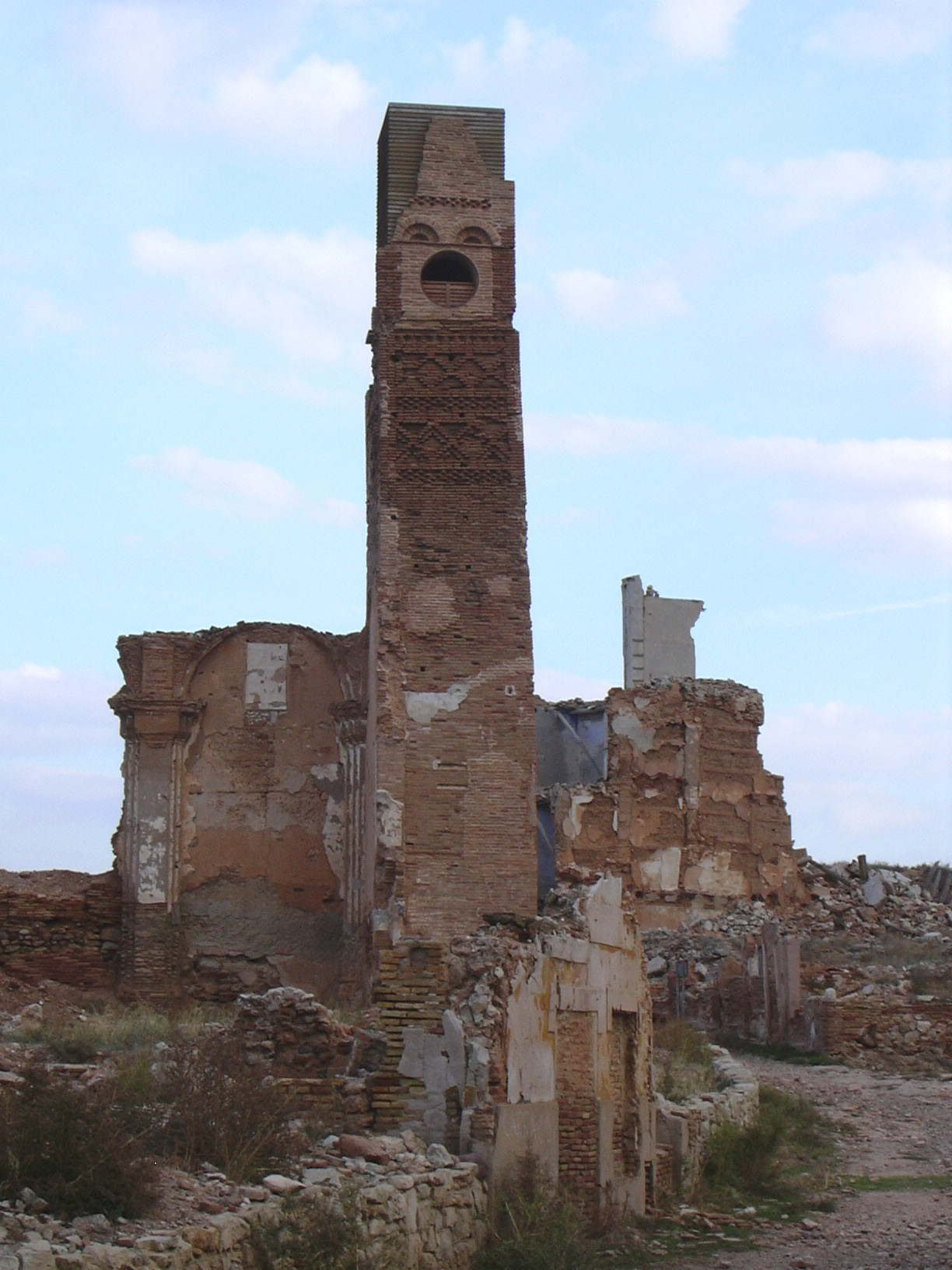
Ruins of Belchite old village

Campo de Belchite is a comarca in Aragon, Spain. It is located in Zaragoza Province, in the transitional area between the Iberian System and the Ebro Valley. The administrative capital is Belchite, the largest town in the comarca.

Some municipal terms of Campo de Belchite are part of the historical region of Lower Aragon.

This comarca was the scene of violent battles during the Spanish Civil War (1936 - 1939) between fascist troops supporting General Francisco Franco and the loyalist Spanish Republican armies.

== Municipalities ==
- Almochuel
- Almonacid de la Cuba
- Azuara
- Belchite
- Codo
- Fuendetodos
- Lagata
- Lécera
- Letux
- Moneva
- Moyuela
- Plenas
- Puebla de Albortón
- Samper del Salz
- Valmadrid

== See also ==
- Battle of Belchite (1937)
- Lower Aragon
- Lobo Hill
