= Samper del Salz =

Coordinates: 41°14′N 0°49′W

- municipality
- Flag Coat of arms
- Interactive map of Samper del Salz
- Country: Spain
- Autonomous community: Aragon
- Province: Zaragoza

Area
  - Total: 11 km^{2} (4.2 sq mi)

Population (2025-01-01)
  - Total: 79
  - Density: 7.2/km^{2} (19/sq mi)
- Time zone: UTC+1 (CET)
  - Summer (DST): UTC+2 (CEST)
- Climate: BSk

Samper del Salz is a municipality located in the Campo de Belchite comarca, province of Zaragoza, Aragon, Spain. According to the 2004 census (INE), the municipality has a population of 130 inhabitants.

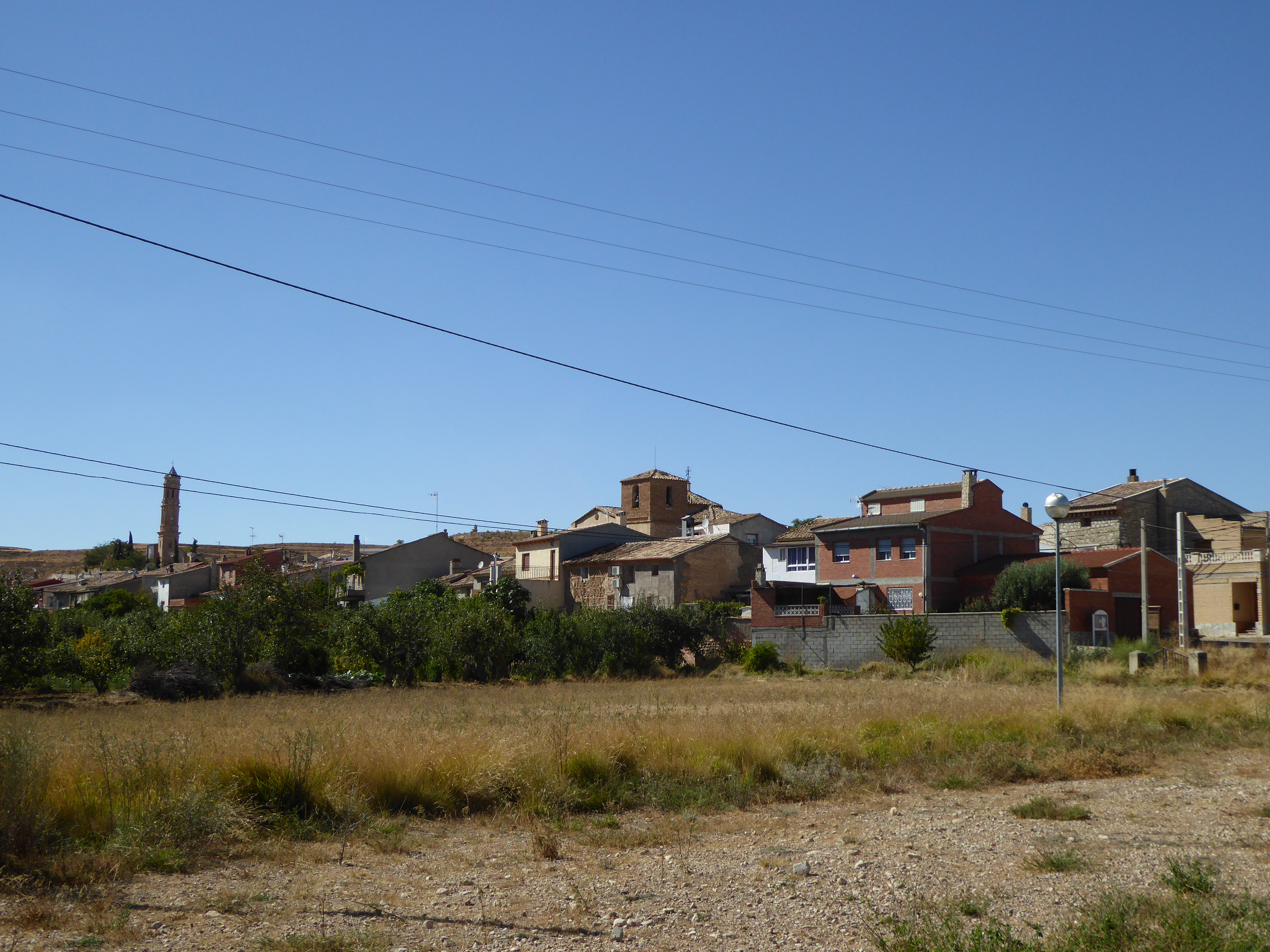
View of Samper del Salz

== See also ==
- List of municipalities in Zaragoza
