= Antonio Cordón García =

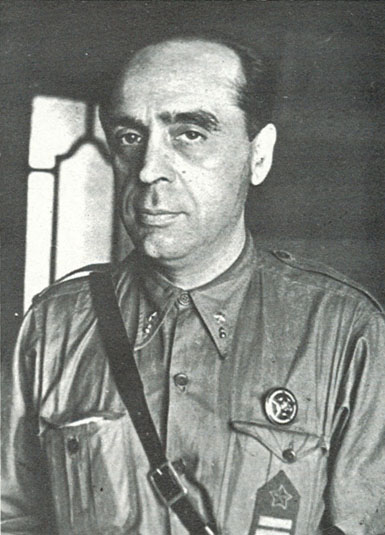
- Born: 1895; Seville, Kingdom of Spain
- Died: 1969 (aged 73–74); Rome, Italy
- Military career
- Allegiance: Spanish Republic (1936–1939); Soviet Union (1939–1945)
- Branch: Spanish Army; Spanish Republican Army
- Service years: 1936–1938
- Rank: chief of staff
- Commands: (1936), Republican Army of the East
- Conflicts: Spanish Civil War: Siege of the Santa María de la Cabeza Sanctuary; Battle of Belchite

Antonio Cordón García (1895 in Seville – 1969) was a Spanish soldier, born in Sevilla, who commanded during the Spanish Civil War.

== Early life ==
As a career soldier as an artilleryman in the Spanish Army, he passed into the reserves in 1932, but reenlisted into active duty upon the beginning of the Spanish Civil War to join the Republican cause. He was a key entity in the conversion of the Popular Front's militias into a disciplined standing army, the Spanish Republican Army, able to fight Franco's Nationalist Front.

== Spanish Civil War ==
His career was brilliant and was parallel to his promotions in the Communist Party, being promoted to undersecretary of Defense and achieving a close relationship with Prime Minister Juan Negrín until he was finally promoted to the position of general, in March 1939.

He participated in many of the battles in the major theaters of wars, including the Siege of the Santa María de la Cabeza Sanctuary, in Teruel, and the Battle of Belchite, in 1938. On 1937 he was the chief of staff of the Army of the East.

Antonio Cordón also actively contacted with the Soviet Union over the provision of war materials, including T-26 light tanks and Polikarpov I-16s. Finalizing the war, Antonio Cordón immigrated to the Soviet Union and formed part of the Central Committee of the Communist Party, working closely with Dolores Ibárruri and Santiago Carrillo, who he coincided in Paris with for a short while. He also had close relations with figures such as Rafael Alberti and Teresa León. After Casado's coup, on 6 March 1939 he fled Spain from the Monòver aerodrome with Negrín and Ibárruri.

== Exile ==
Despite having a wife and seven children in Spain, he never married again but had another child. In the Soviet Union, he wrote his memoirs Trayectoria. He died in Rome in 1968. After the death of the dictator Francisco Franco in 1975 and the change of the political situation in Spain, his remains were transferred to Spain.
