= Azuara impact structure =

Azuara structure
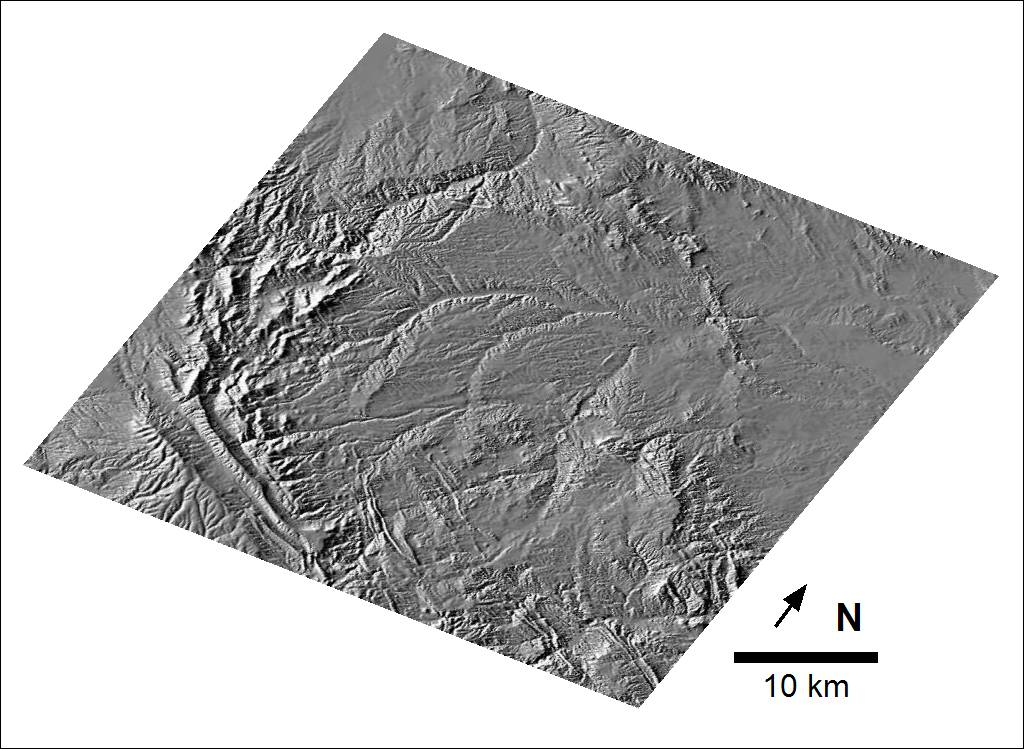
- Morphological signature of the Azuara structure taken from the digital map of Spain, 1:250,000

- Location within Spain
- Location: Azuara, Zaragoza Province, Aragon, Spain; 41.18°N 0.88°W

Impact crater structure
- Confidence: Unlikely
- Diameter: Supposedly ~30 km (19 mi)
- Age: 32 to 40 Ma; Late Eocene or Early Oligocene
- Exposed: Yes
- Drilled: No

The Azuara structure is a structural feature of about 30 kilometres (19 mi) diameter, located in northeastern Spain, roughly 50 kilometres (31 mi) south of Zaragoza. The name is attributed to the small town of Azuara located near the center of the structure. It has been subject to controversial, generally rejected claims that it represents an impact feature. It was formerly listed in the Earth Impact Database, but was subsequently removed.

== History ==
The first claims of an impact origin was given by Wolfgang Hammann as early as 1980, and the first field work was done by Johannes Fiebag in the early eighties. In 1985, Ernstson et al. published the purported occurrence of shock metamorphism.

== Reception ==
Mainstream scientific opinion rejects the Azuara structure as being of impact origin, with the shock effects being tectonic features, the supposed impact ejecta (Pelarda Formation) actually being Quaternary alluvial fans and supposed impact breccias and dike breccias are generally interpreted as karst features and soil formations. The opposition against the impact origin for Azuara has been supported by an analysis and paper (Langenhorst & Deutsch 1996) rejecting the occurrence of shock metamorphism in Azuara rocks. Based on this paper and analysis, Azuara was removed from the Canadian Impact Data Base when its management changed to the University of New Brunswick.

== See also ==
- Rubielos de la Cérida impact structure
