= Valmadrid =

Coordinates: 41°26′N 0°53′W

- municipality
- Flag Coat of arms
- Interactive map of Valmadrid
- Country: Spain
- Autonomous community: Aragon
- Province: Zaragoza

Area
  - Total: 50 km^{2} (19 sq mi)

Population (2025-01-01)
  - Total: 112
  - Density: 2.2/km^{2} (5.8/sq mi)
- Time zone: UTC+1 (CET)
  - Summer (DST): UTC+2 (CEST)
- Climate: BSk

Valmadrid is a municipality located in the Campo de Belchite comarca, province of Zaragoza, Aragon, Spain. According to the 2004 census (INE), the municipality has a population of 100 inhabitants.

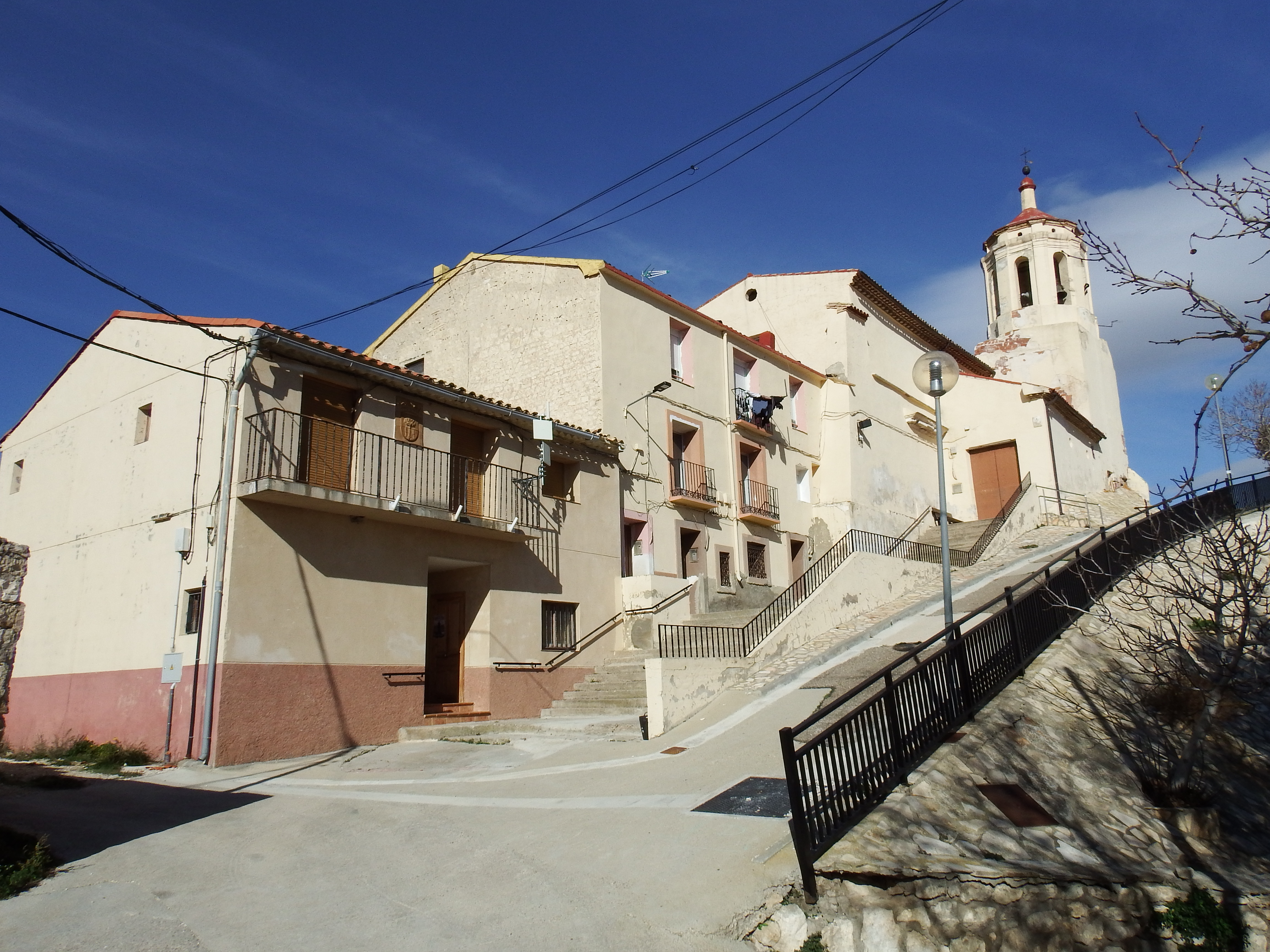
Valmadrid Town Hall

== See also ==
- List of municipalities in Zaragoza
