= Museo del Grabado de Goya =

Art museum in Spain

Coordinates: 41.33584°N 0.92513°W

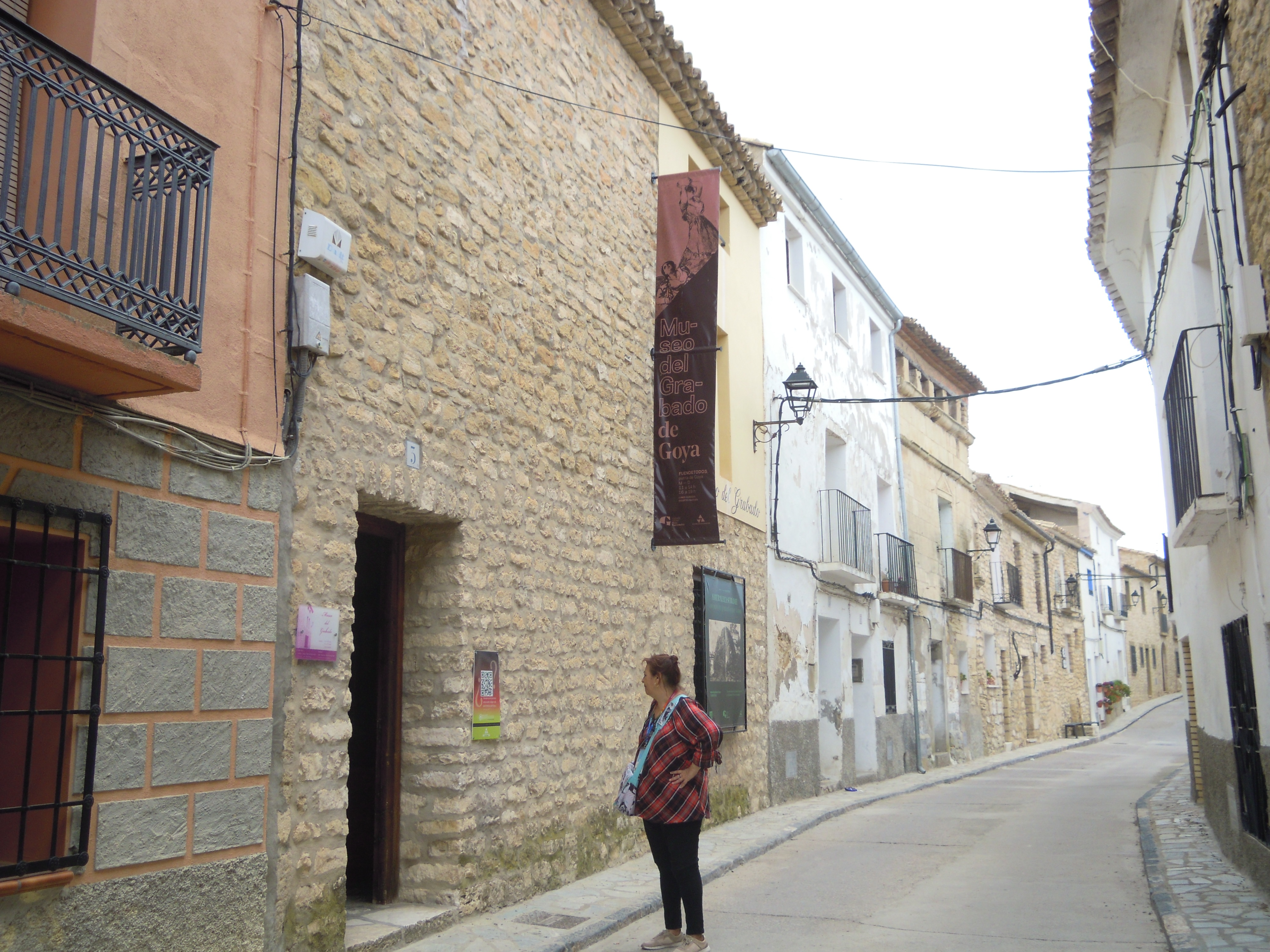
Museo del Grabado de Goya, in Fuendetodos

The Museo del Grabado de Goya (English: Goya Engraving Museum) is an art museum dedicated to the engravings made by Spanish artist Francisco Goya, in Fuendetodos, near Zaragoza, Spain. It is the only museum in the world dedicated entirely to Goya's artworks. It is located right next to the painter's birthplace, and it was inaugurated in 1989.

== Building ==
The museum is housed in a modest peasant home from the 18th century, and it is decorated accordingly. It consists of a hall, a living room and a kitchen. It also helds graphic documentation.

== Museum ==
The museum is housed in a typical village building, built in stone and remodeled for its new use. The Provincial Council of Zaragoza and the Fuendetodos City Council financed its restoration and the museum was inaugurated in April 1989.

This building is actually a typical house from Aragon. It is composed of three floors: the ground floor with the vestibule, the kitchen, agricultural rooms and a small patio with a well; the first floor is composed of four rooms and the second floor is an attic. The exhibition is located on both floors, while the ground floor is occupied by the reception, the store, the offices and a small room that hosts temporary exhibitions.

The museum contains four permanent collections of engravings by Goya:

- Los caprichos
- The Disasters of War
- La Tauromaquia
- Los disparates

The first floor displays 22 prints from Los disparates series, 40 prints from La Tauromaquia and 82 prints from The Disasters of War, while the second floor displays 80 engravings from Los caprichos. The collection was created thanks to several donations of works from renowned artists bought after they were auctioned.

== See also ==
- List of single-artist museums
