= Letux =

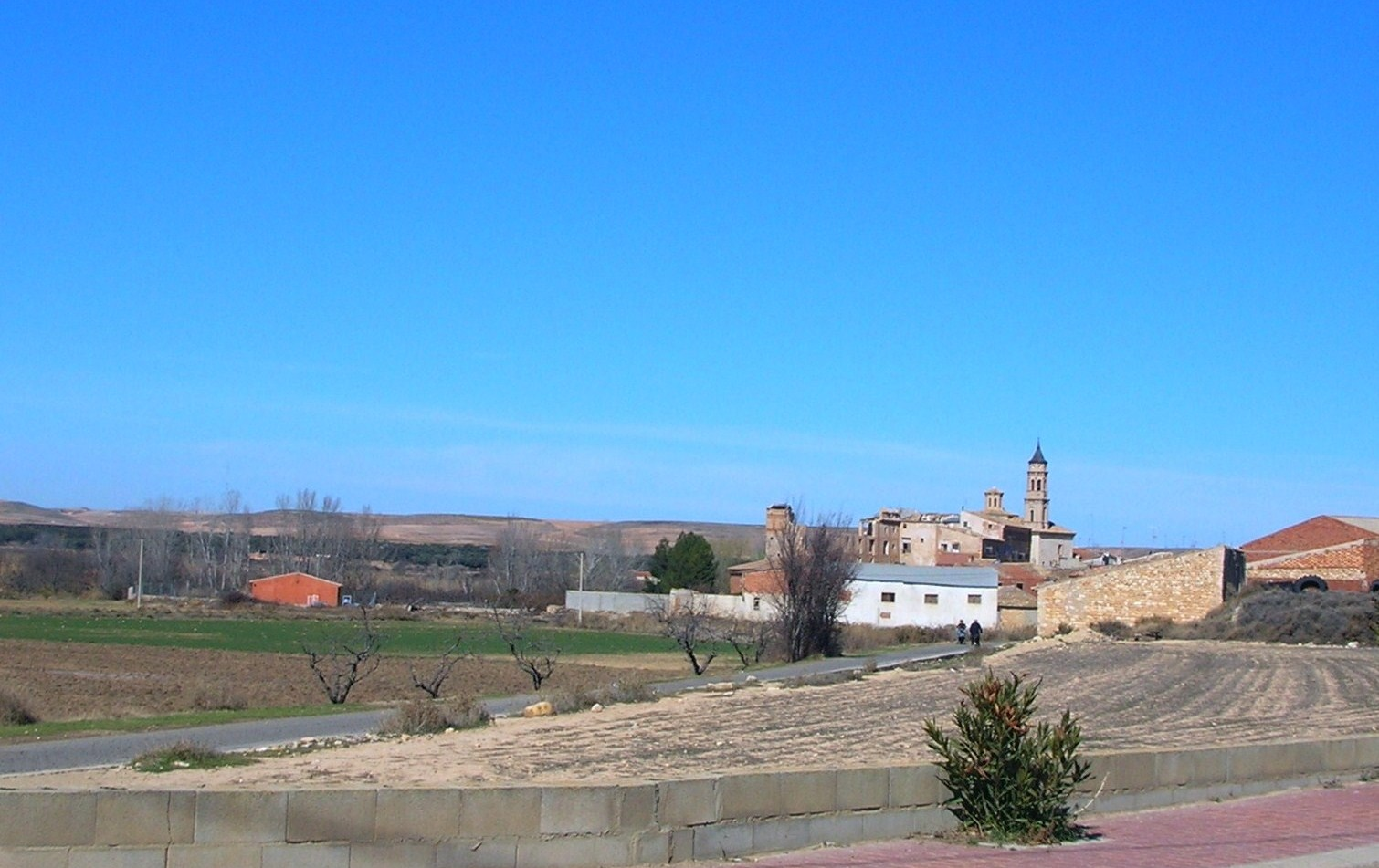
- View of Letux town around noon

- Flag Coat of arms

- Location within Aragon Location within Spain Location within Europe
- Country: Spain
- Autonomous community: Aragon
- Province: Zaragoza
- Municipality: Letux

Area
  - Total: 30 km^{2} (12 sq mi)

Population (2025-01-01)
  - Total: 349
  - Density: 12/km^{2} (30/sq mi)
- Time zone: UTC+1 (CET)
  - Summer (DST): UTC+2 (CEST)

Letux is a municipality located in the Campo de Belchite comarca, province of Zaragoza, Aragon, Spain. According to the 2010 census, the municipality has a population of 425 inhabitants.

== See also ==
- List of municipalities in Zaragoza
