= Azuara =

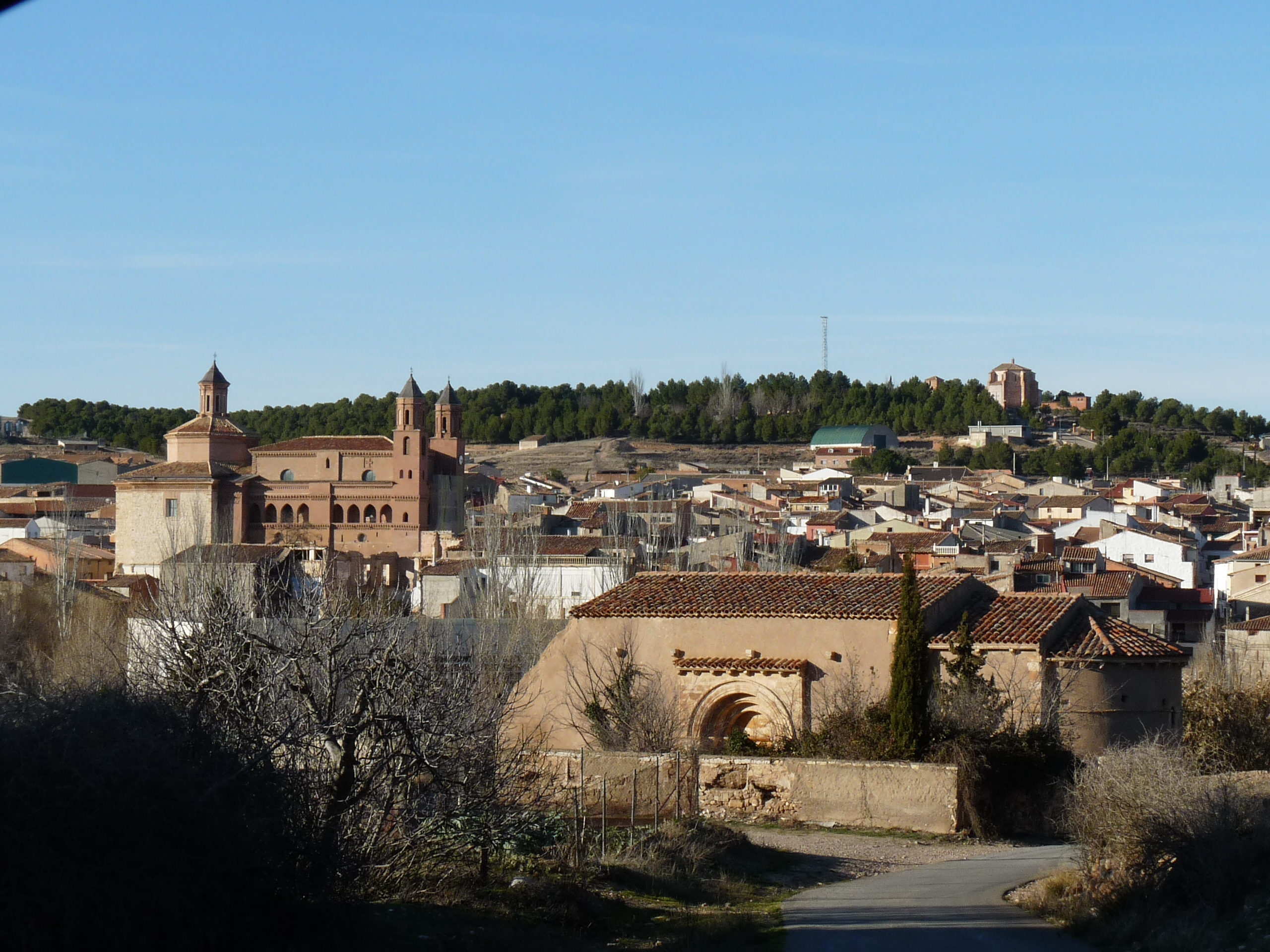

- Flag Coat of arms

- Location within Aragon Location within Spain Location within Europe
- Coordinates: 41°15′N 0°52′W
- Country: Spain
- Autonomous community: Aragon
- Province: Zaragoza
- Comarca: Campo de Belchite

Area
  - Total: 165 km^{2} (64 sq mi)
- Elevation: 603 m (1,978 ft)

Population (2025-01-01)
  - Total: 548
  - Density: 3.32/km^{2} (8.60/sq mi)
- Time zone: UTC+1 (CET)
  - Summer (DST): UTC+2 (CEST)
- Postal code: 50140
- Climate: BSk

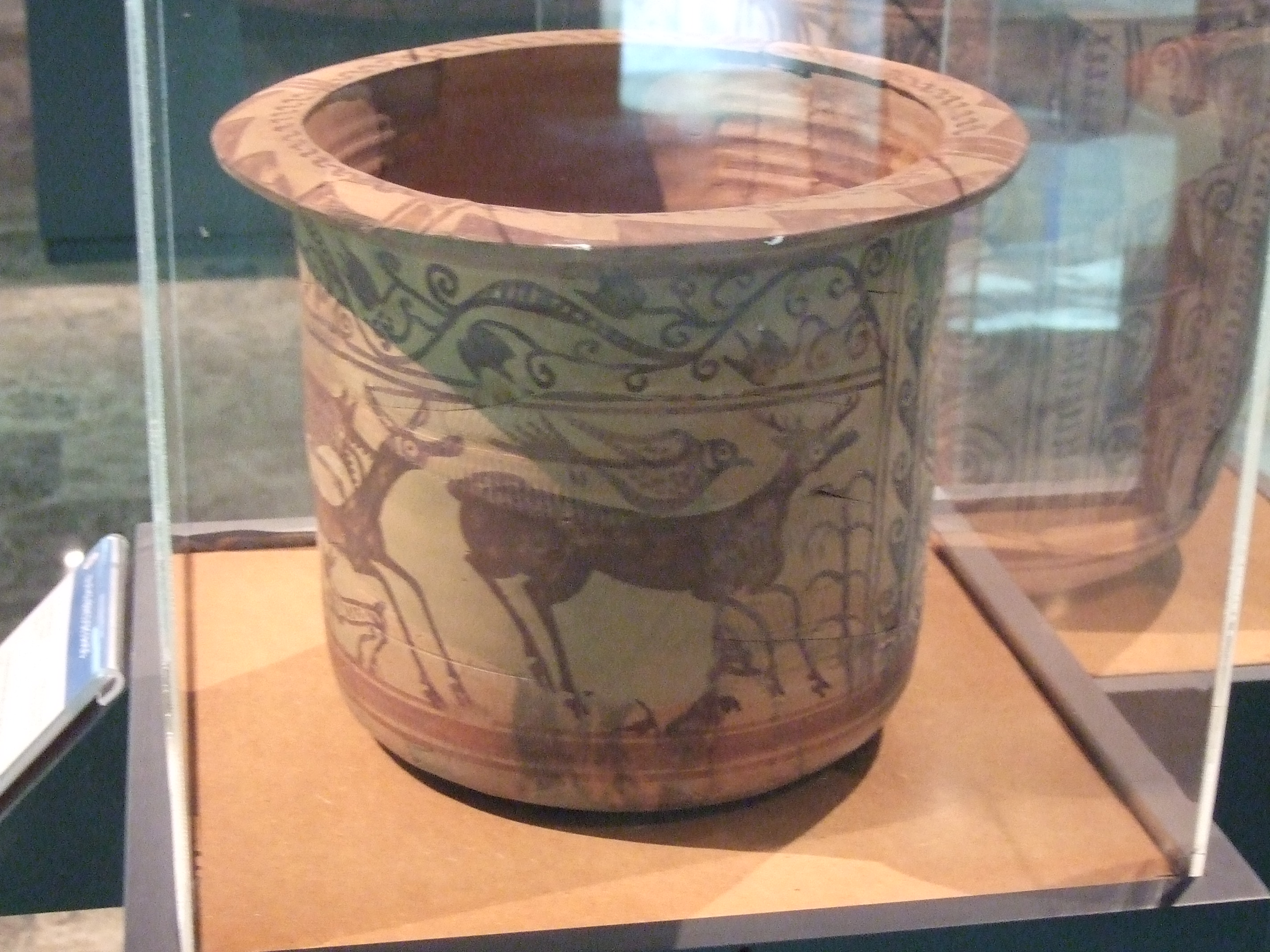
Decorated ancient Iberian earthenware showing deer, one of them attacked by a wolf. Cueva del Cabuchico, Azuara. 1st century BC

Azuara is a municipality located in the province of Zaragoza, Aragon, Spain. According to the 2010 census the municipality has a population of 220 inhabitants. Its postal code is 50140

Cueva del Cabuchico is an ancient Iberian archaeological site near Azuara.

== See also ==
- Azuara impact structure
- Jiloca Comarca
- List of municipalities in Zaragoza
