= Almonacid de la Cuba Dam =

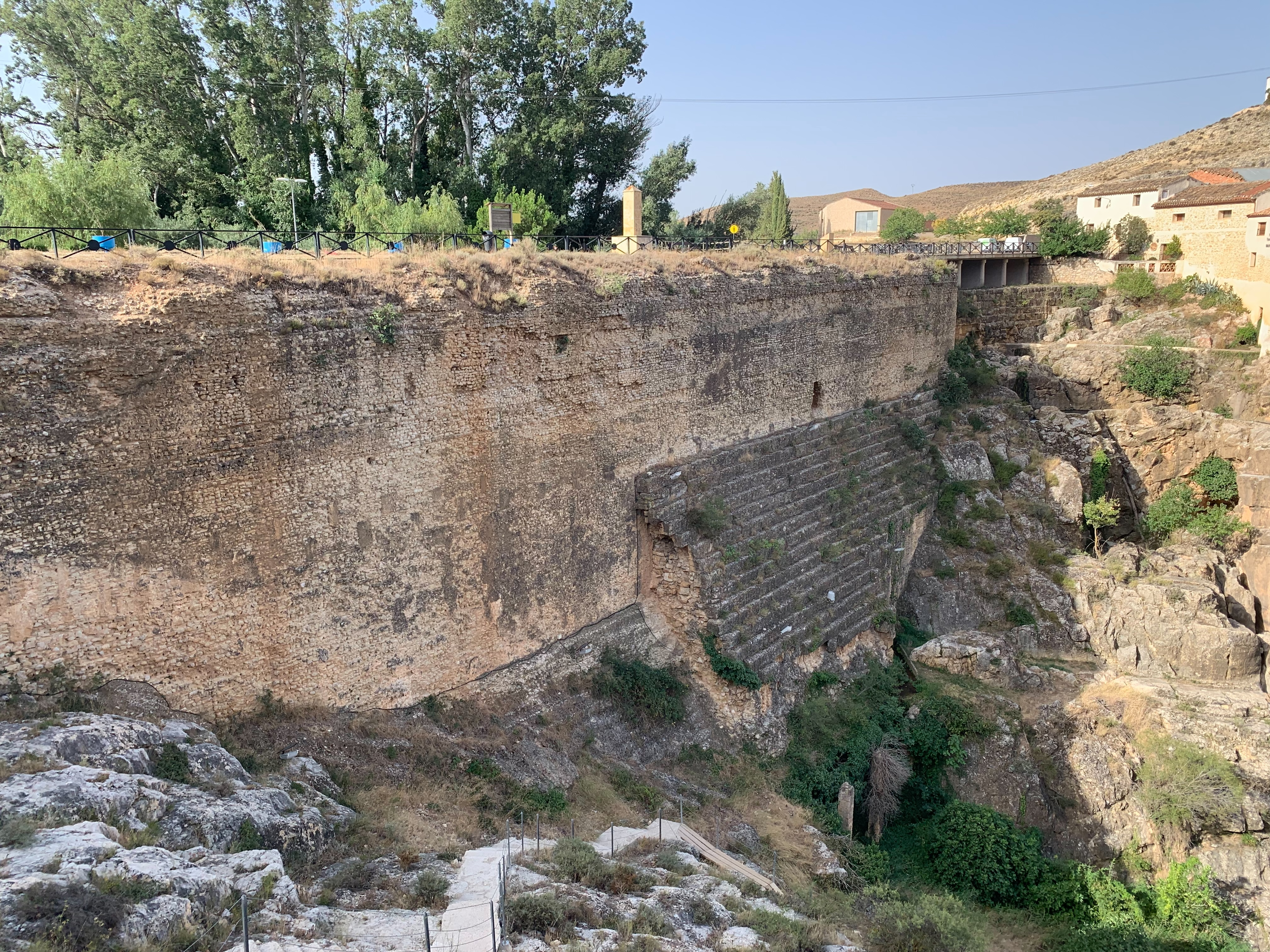
- Interactive map of Almonacid de la Cuba Dam
- Location: Zaragoza province, Aragon, Spain
- Coordinates: 41°16′29″N 0°47′20″W
- Opening date: 1st century

Dam and spillways
- Impounds: Aguasvivas (Ebro basin)
- Height: 34 m (112 ft)
- Length: 120 m (390 ft)
- Width (base): 38 m (125 ft)

The Almonacid de la Cuba Dam is a Roman gravity dam on the Aguasvivas River in Almonacid de la Cuba, Zaragoza province, Aragon, Spain, dating to the 1st century AD. This dam, with a height of 34 metres (112 ft) was the highest in the Spain until 1590.

Construction was begun under Augustus; the remains of this earlier, three-arched, dam on the site have been detected, but it was breached by flooding early, perhaps even during construction. Immediately thereafter it was reconstructed as a gravity dam, incorporating portions of the earlier structure. It underwent repairs under Claudius and under Trajan, at which time it was heightened, probably to offset the effects of silting.

The dam was abandoned by the Moors in the 13th century, but later reused, and is still in use today. In 2020 a system of walkways and footbridges was constructed to allow visitors a close-up view of the dam and its surroundings. In 2024 the town of Almonacid de la Cuba was spared by the dam from flooding that devastated other nearby towns.

== See also ==
- List of Roman dams and reservoirs
- Roman architecture
- Roman engineering
