= Lagata =

- municipality
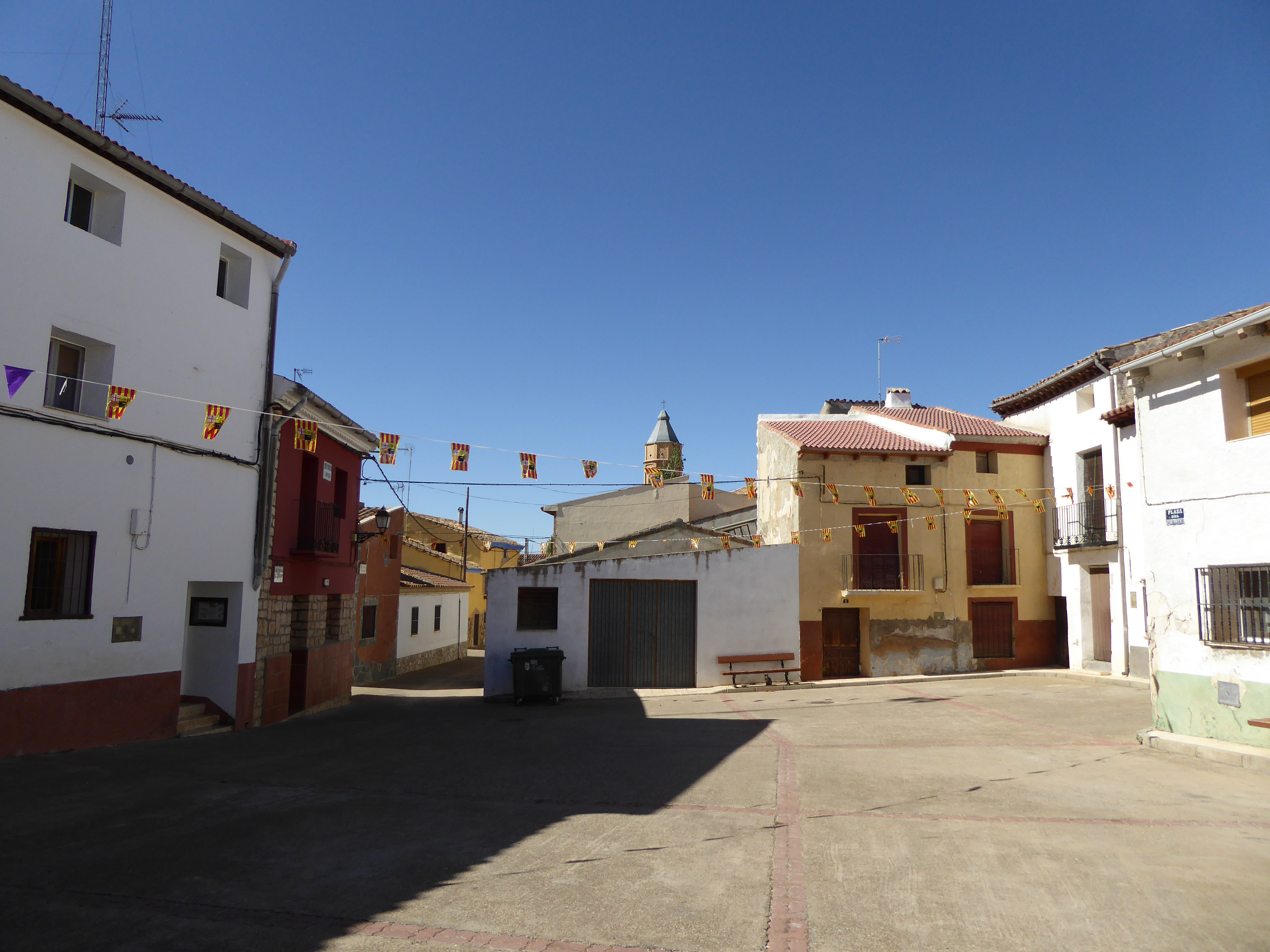

- Flag Coat of arms

- Location within Aragon Location within Spain Location within Europe
- Country: Spain
- Autonomous community: Aragon
- Province: Zaragoza

Area
  - Total: 23 km^{2} (8.9 sq mi)

Population (2025-01-01)
  - Total: 113
  - Density: 4.9/km^{2} (13/sq mi)
- Time zone: UTC+1 (CET)
  - Summer (DST): UTC+2 (CEST)
- Climate: BSk
- Website: https://www.lagata.org

Lagata is a municipality located in the Campo de Belchite comarca, province of Zaragoza, Aragon, Spain. According to the 2004 census (INE), the municipality has a population of 132 inhabitants.

== See also ==
- List of municipalities in Zaragoza
