= Puebla de Albortón =

Coordinates: 41°23′N 0°51′W

- Coat of arms
- Interactive map of Puebla de Albortón
- Country: Spain
- Autonomous community: Aragon
- Province: Zaragoza
- Municipality: Puebla de Albortón

Area
  - Total: 76 km^{2} (29 sq mi)

Population (2025-01-01)
  - Total: 133
  - Density: 1.8/km^{2} (4.5/sq mi)
- Time zone: UTC+1 (CET)
  - Summer (DST): UTC+2 (CEST)
- Climate: BSk

Puebla de Albortón is a municipality located in the Campo de Belchite comarca, province of Zaragoza, Aragon, Spain. According to the 2004 census (INE), the municipality has a population of 144 inhabitants.

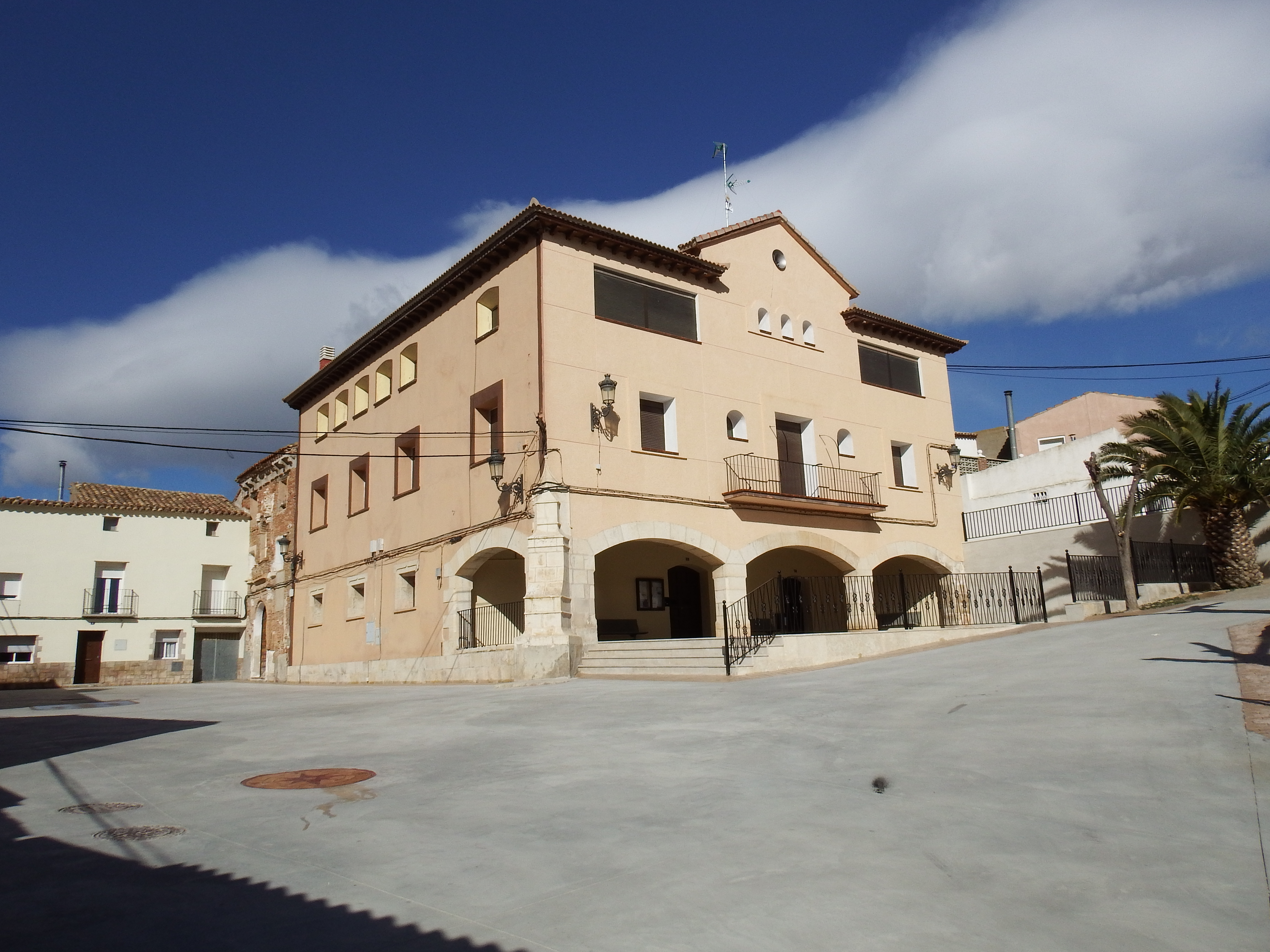
Town Hall of Puebla de Albortón, Zaragoza

== See also ==
- List of municipalities in Zaragoza
