= Lobo Hill =

Mountain in Spain

Lobo
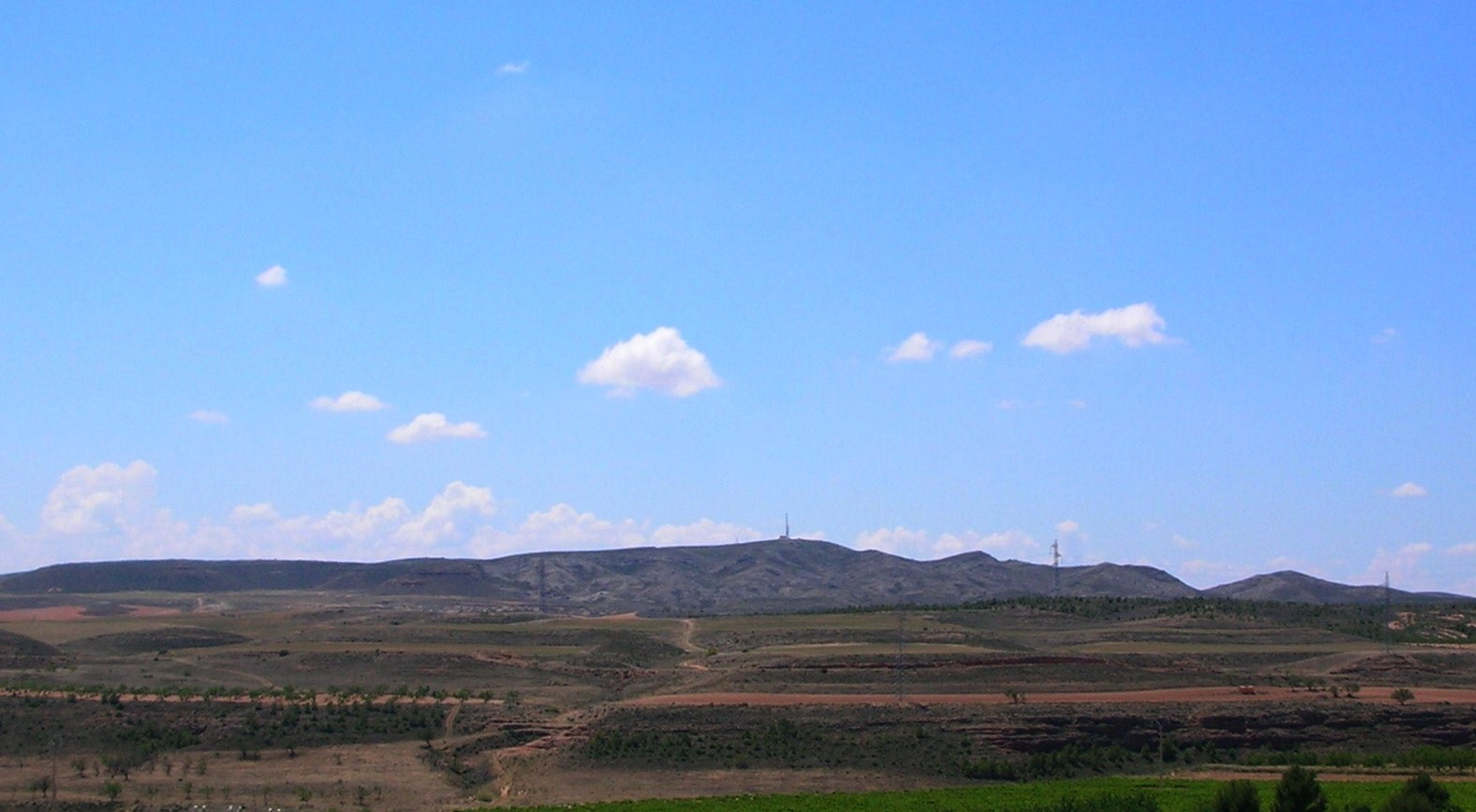
- View of Lobo Hill from Belchite old town

Highest point
- Elevation: 630 m (2,070 ft)
- Listing: List of mountains in Aragon
- Coordinates: 41°16′24″N 00°45′58″W

Geography
- Location within Spain
- Location: Campo de Belchite, Aragon
- Parent range: Isolated hills; Sistema Ibérico

Geology
- Mountain type: Sedimentary rock

Climbing
- First ascent: Unknown
- Easiest route: Drive from Belchite or Almonacid de la Cuba

Lobo, also known as El Lobo, Cabezo del Lobo, Cerro del Lobo and Mojón del Lobo, is a 630 m high mountain in the Campo de Belchite comarca, Zaragoza Province, Aragon, Spain, located about 3 km (1.86 miles) to the south of Belchite and 2 km (1.24 miles) east of Almonacid de la Cuba. This hill is named after the wolf (Spanish: lobo), for there were wolves in the area until the 19th century.

Lobo Hill is arid and desolate-looking. It is barely covered with low and sparse clumps of dryland vegetation. There is a triangulation station at the top marked "LOBO" in large letters.

== History ==
There was much military activity in and around this arid mountain both in 1809 during the Peninsular War and again in 1937–1938 at the height of the Spanish Civil War, during the Battle of Belchite (1937). The top of the hill commands an excellent view of the Campo de Belchite.

The holes and tunnels from where the Spanish Republican artillery positions fired towards what is now Belchite old town have been preserved and are open to visitors.

There is also a broadcasting station with a large antenna on top of the hill.

== See also ==
- Battle of Belchite (1937)
- Mountains of Aragon
