= Rubielos de la Cérida impact structure =

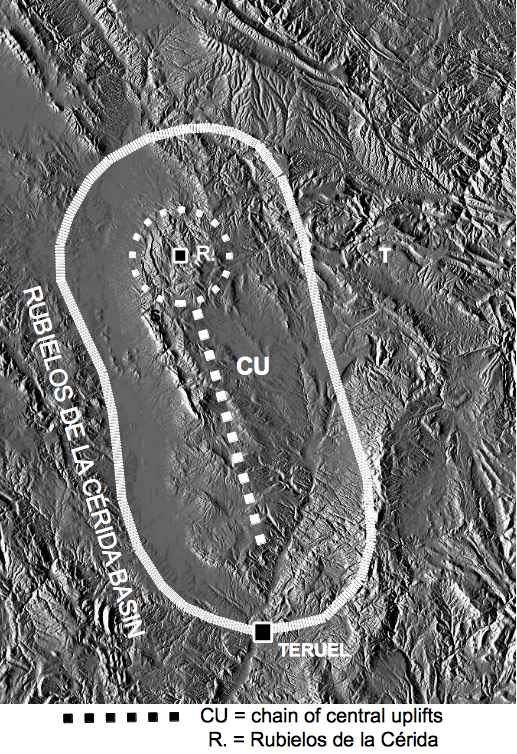
- Supposed morphological signature of the Rubielos de Cérida structure taken from the digital map of Spain, 1 : 250,000
- Location: Teruel, Aragon, Spain

Impact crater structure
- Confidence: Largely rejected
- Diameter: Claimed 40–80 kilometres (25–50 mi)
- Age: Supposedly 30 - 40 Ma

The c. 80 km x 40 km sized Rubielos de la Cérida structure is a claimed impact feature located in Aragon, northeast Spain, north of Teruel purported to have formed during the Upper Eocene or Oligocene (roughly 30 - 40 Mill. years ago). The name is derived from the nearby village of Rubielos de la Cérida. The claim that the structure represents an impact feature is rejected by the majority of scientists, and the mainstream consensus is that the supposed structure is explained by non-impact related tectonic structures, namely the Jiloca-Calatayud graben and the Alfambra-Teruel graben.

== Reception ==
The origin of the Rubielos de la Cérida structure has been debated, and the mainstream opinion of Spanish geologists is that the structure is not an impact feature. The supposed shock effects are actually tectonic features, the purported impact ejecta are Cenozoic alluvial fans or conglomerates and supposed impact breccias and dike breccias are interpreted as karst features and soil formations. The opposition against the impact origin for Rubielos de la Cérida (and Azuara) has been supported by an analysis and paper (Langenhorst & Deutsch 1996) rejecting the occurrence of shock metamorphism in Azuara rocks. It is not listed in the Earth Impact Database.

== See also ==
- Azuara impact structure
