= Casa natal de Goya =

Historic house museum in Spain

Coordinates: 41.2033°N 0.57320°W

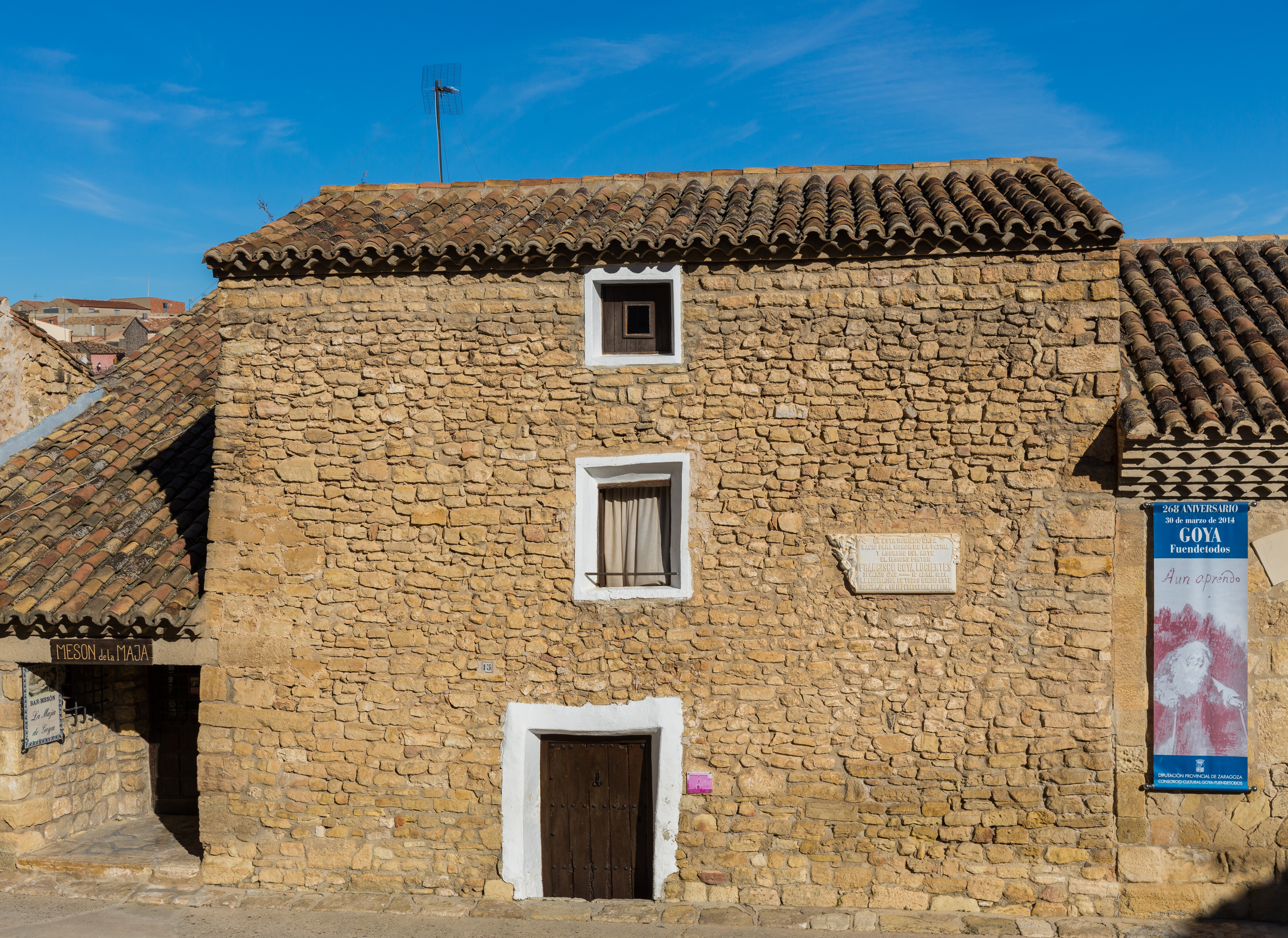
Casa natal de Goya, in Fuendetodos

The Casa natal de Goya (English: Goya's Birthplace) is an historical house museum in Fuendetodos, Aragon, where renowned artist Francisco Goya was born in 1746. It is, since 1989, a house museum, that preserves reproductions of artworks and documents from Goya, and also objects and furniture of Aragonese style. An inscription in the façade of the house identifies it as the birthplace of Goya. Both the house museum and the contiguous Sala Zuloaga are open to the public.

== The building ==
The building is a rural house of farmers, with their typical objects. It still has the same rural and modest atmosphere of the past. The façade and the walls are of well worked masonry. It has three floors, with the ground floor consisting of a square, a kitchen with a kitchenette and an entrance. A staircase leads to the first floor, where there is a room and two bedrooms. The false floor is a barn with a two-sided roof.

== History ==
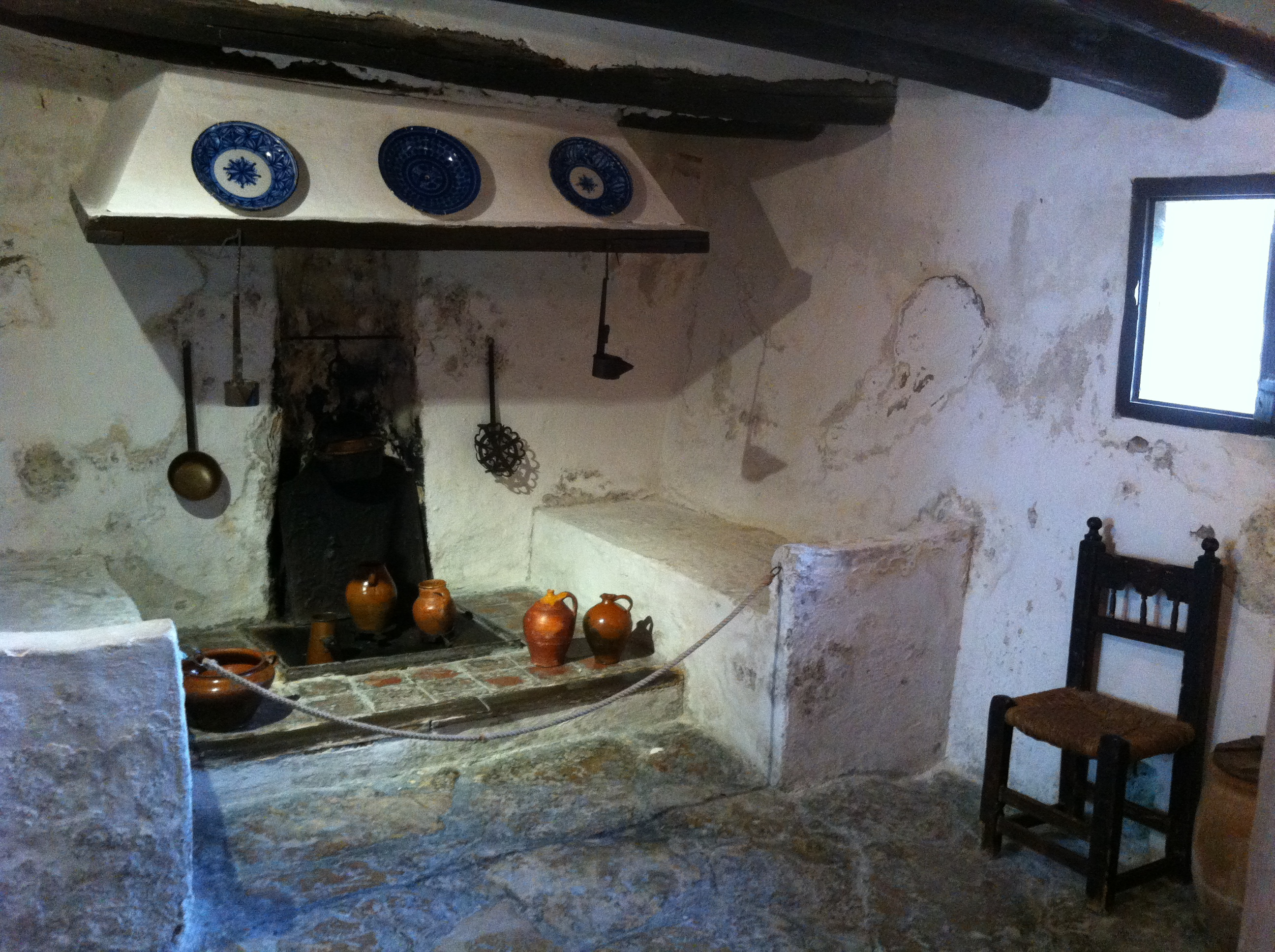
Detail of the kitchen

This house was built in the early 18th century and was owned by Miguel Lucientes, brother of Gracia Lucientes, the painter's mother and of noble descent. Shortly after the Goya family settled in the house due to the work of his father, José Goya, who had to gild the main altarpiece of the local church, Francisco Goya was born, on 30 March 1746. He lived here the first six years of his life, when his family returned to Zaragoza.

In 1913, the painter Ignacio Zuloaga, and a group of artists from Zaragoza, identified the house as the birthplace of Goya, and bought it to Benita Aznar Lucientes, a niece-in-law of the artist. In 1928, the Syndicate of Initiatives and Propaganda of Aragon (SIPA) decided to celebrate the centenary of the artist's death, and one of their initiatives was the preservation of the house.

Unfortunately, during the Spanish Civil War, the birthplace was partially destroyed. It would be rebuilt by Teodoro Ríos, in 1946. Later, in 1981, the General Directorate of Political Arts approved a new project of restoration of the building, which was completed in 1985. In 1982, a Royal Decree declared it a Spanish Historic Monument.

== Sala Zuloaga ==
The Sala Zuloaga, or Zuloaga Room, is an exhibition space created in the house next to the birthplace of Goya, which the Basque painter Ignacio Zuloaga converted into schools bearing his name in 1917. It is a traditional two-storey house that was converted into an exhibition hall in the 1990s and opened on March 30, 1996, with an exhibition on Zuloaga.

The Sala Zuloaga is specialized in graphic arts, and has held exhibitions of artists such as Pablo Picasso, Joan Miró, Luis Gordillo, Antonio Saura, Eduardo Chillida, Joan Brossa, among others.

== See also ==
- List of single-artist museums
