= Rubielos de la Cérida =

- Location within Spain
- Coordinates: 40°46′N 1°12′W
- Country: Spain
- Autonomous community: Aragon
- Province: Teruel
- Comarca: Jiloca

Area
  - Total: 66.90 km^{2} (25.83 sq mi)
- Elevation: 1,240 m (4,070 ft)

Population (2025-01-01)
  - Total: 20
  - Density: 0.30/km^{2} (0.77/sq mi)
- Time zone: UTC+1 (CET)
  - Summer (DST): UTC+2 (CEST)

Rubielos de la Cérida is a municipality located in the province of Teruel, Aragon, Spain. According to the 2010 census the municipality had a population of 45 inhabitants. Its postal code is 44166.

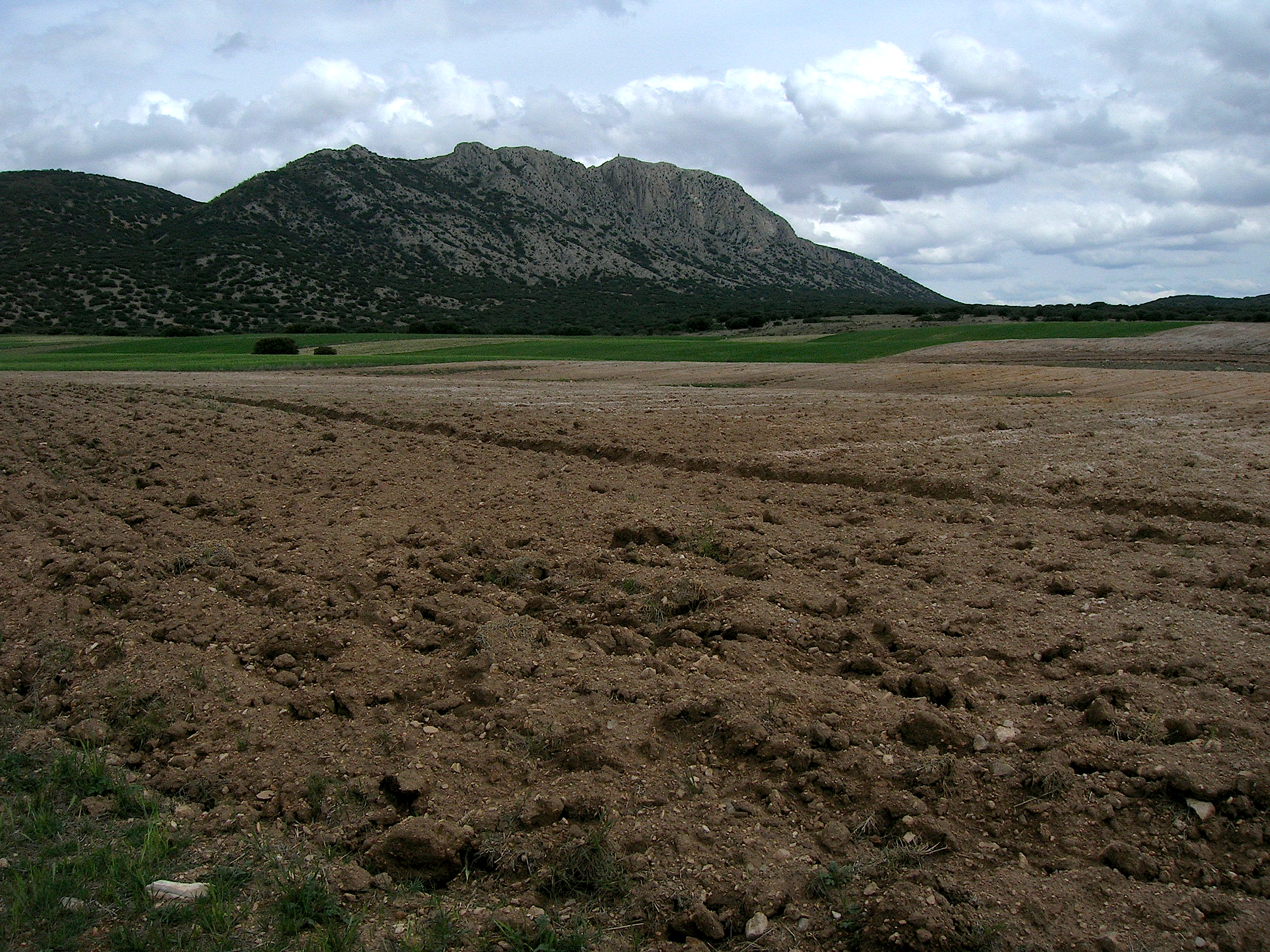
"Pico Palomera", part of the central-uplift chain in the Rubielos de la Cérida impact structure in Sierra Palomera, Sistema Ibérico

== See also ==
- Rubielos de la Cérida impact structure
- Jiloca Comarca
- List of municipalities in Teruel
