= Almochuel =

- municipality
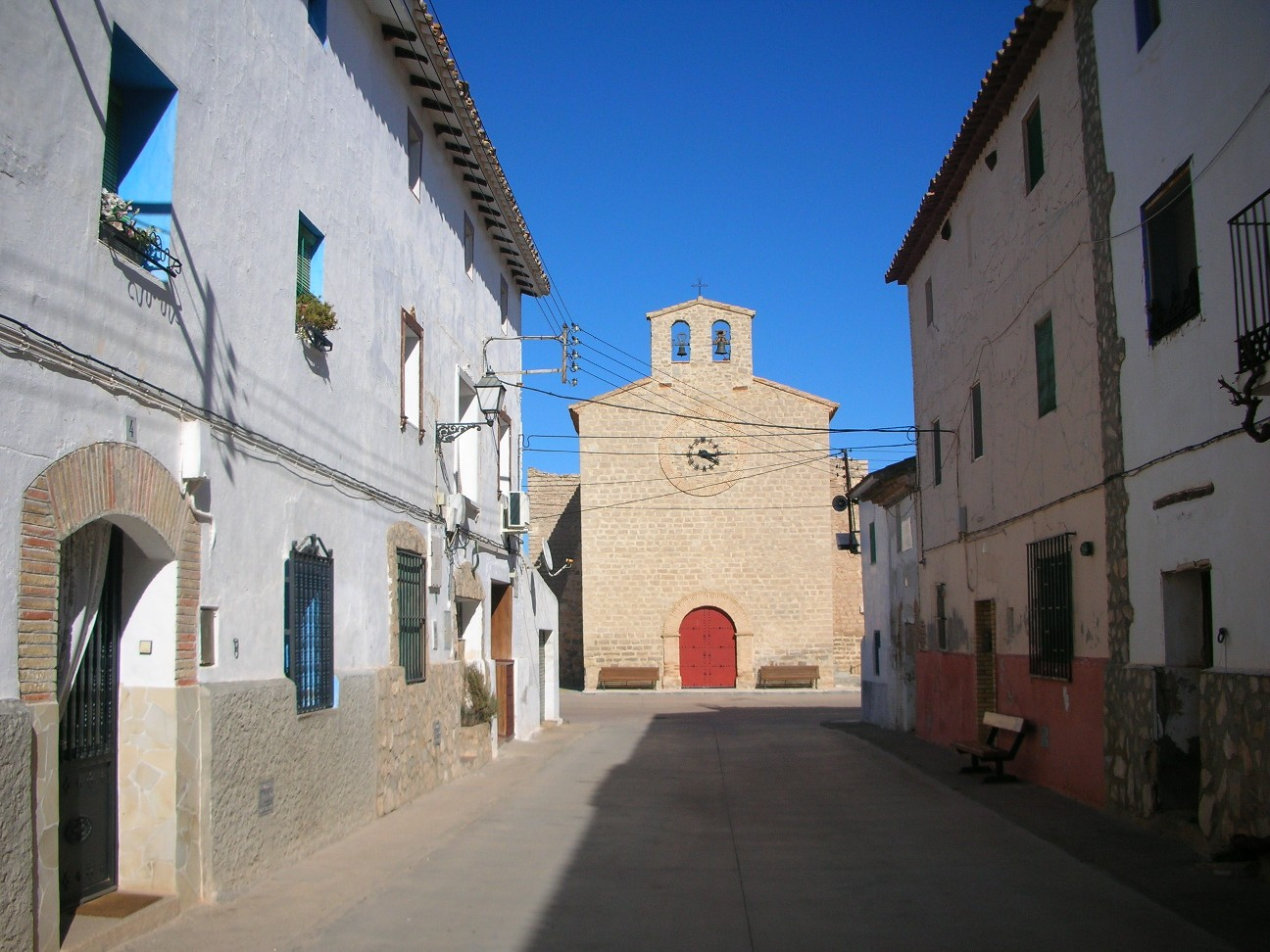
- Almochuel church

- Location within Aragon Location within Spain Location within Europe
- Country: Spain
- Autonomous community: Aragon
- Province: Zaragoza

Area
  - Total: 31 km^{2} (12 sq mi)

Population (2025-01-01)
  - Total: 22
  - Density: 0.71/km^{2} (1.8/sq mi)
- Time zone: UTC+1 (CET)
  - Summer (DST): UTC+2 (CEST)
- Climate: BSk

Almochuel is a municipality located in the Campo de Belchite comarca, province of Zaragoza, Aragon, Spain. According to the 2008 census (INE), the municipality has a population of 33 inhabitants.

== See also ==
- List of municipalities in Zaragoza
