= Codo, Aragon =

Codo
- municipality
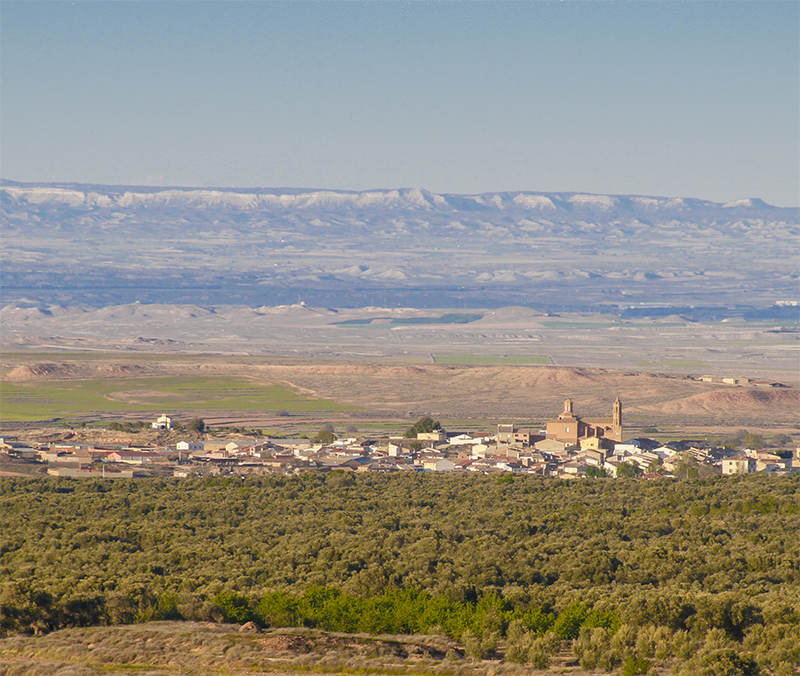

- Flag Coat of arms

- Location within Aragon Location within Spain Location within Europe
- Country: Spain
- Autonomous community: Aragon
- Province: Zaragoza
- Comarca: Campo de Belchite

Area
  - Total: 11.4 km^{2} (4.4 sq mi)
- Elevation: 342 m (1,122 ft)

Population (2025-01-01)
  - Total: 204
  - Density: 17.9/km^{2} (46.3/sq mi)
- Time zone: UTC+1 (CET)
  - Summer (DST): UTC+2 (CEST)
- Climate: BSk

Codo is a municipality located in the province of Zaragoza, Aragon, Spain. According to the 2008 census (INE), the municipality has a population of 228 inhabitants.

This town is located in the Campo de Belchite comarca, between Belchite and Quinto.

== See also ==
- List of municipalities in Zaragoza
