= Battle of Belchite (1937) =

Battle of the Spanish Civil War (1937)

Coordinates: 41.3000°N 0.7500°W

- Part of the Spanish Civil War
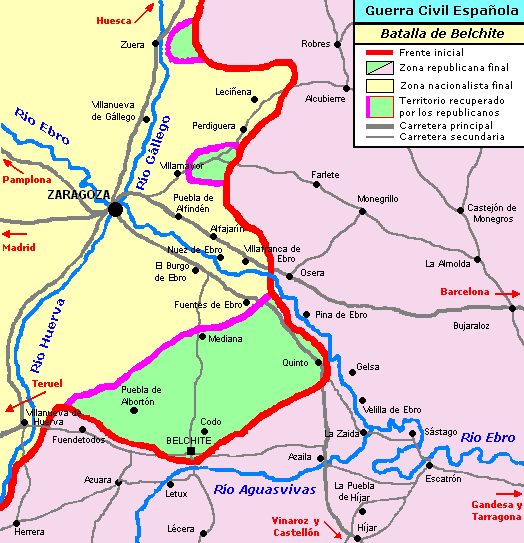
- Progress of the Battle of Belchite with initial and final situations shown.
Date	24 August 1937 – 7 September 1937 (conquest of the town of Belchite) (2 weeks) The Offensive against Zaragoza continued until the beginning of November 1937
Location	Belchite, near Zaragoza, Spain
Result	Republican victory

Belligerents
Spanish Republic: International Brigades	Nationalist Spain

Commanders and leaders
Colonel Vicente Rojo Lluch; General Sebastián Pozas; General Antonio Cordón; General Walter; General Kléber; Commander Enrique Líster	General Miguel Ponte; Lieutenant Colonel San Martín †; Commander Santa Pau †; Major Alfonso Trallero †

Strength
80,000 infantry 105 tanks 200 aircraft (for the whole Offensive of Zaragoza) 8-25,000 infantry, 40 tanks, 80 aircraft to conquer the town of Belchite	70,000 infantry, (5,000 in the town of Belchite, including civilians) 100 aircraft, 100 artillery

Casualties and losses
2,800 killed 6,000 wounded (in the town of Belchite)	2,000 killed 600 wounded 2,411 taken prisoner, including civilians (in the town of Belchite)

The Battle of Belchite refers to a series of military operations that took place between 24 August and 7 September 1937, in and around the town of Belchite (almost 4,000 inhabitants in 1936, decreasing to around 2,600 during the battle, from the repression and displacement of the first year), in Aragon during the Spanish Civil War, as part of a much bigger offensive to take Zaragoza, that continued until the beginning of November 1937.

Since the Offensive of Zaragoza failed, the Republicans started calling it Battle of Belchite for propaganda reasons instead, so that it would look like a victory, the journalists that came to report the victory, including Ernest Hemingway, contributed to this change of names. The Nationalists continued the confusion, since they exploited the "Numantine" defense of the town for propaganda too, to counteract the bad image of the bombing of Guernica.

== Prelude ==
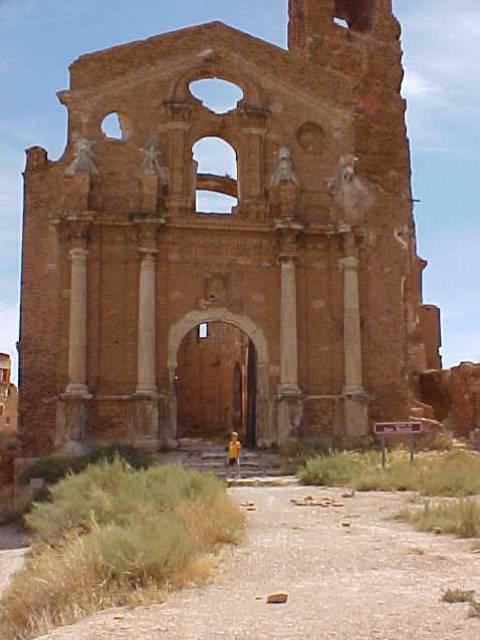
Ruins of the old village

After failed attempts to capture Brunete, the Republican military leadership decided to try a new series of offensives to slow down the Nationalist advance in the north. A new campaign, therefore, was planned for Aragon. The decision was based on political as well as military considerations, as the government saw it as a way to decrease Anarchist and Workers' Party of Marxist Unification (POUM) influence in the region by bringing in communist troops and incorporating three Anarchist divisions into the newly designated Army of the East under command of General Sebastián Pozas. Another objective of the planned offensive was to take Zaragoza, the capital of Aragon, which was only a few kilometres behind enemy lines. Capturing the regional capital offered more than symbolic significance, because it was also the communication centre of the whole Aragon front. The first year of the war in this part of Spain had emphasised that the possession of key towns was of far greater importance than the control of wide areas of open countryside. The Nationalists had only three divisions, the 51st, 52nd and 105th, spread across the three hundred kilometres of front, with the majority of their troops concentrated in towns. General Pozas and his Chief of Staff Antonio Cordon set up their headquarters in Bujaraloz. Their plan was to break through at seven different points on the central one hundred-kilometre stretch between Zuera and Belchite. The object of splitting their attacking forces was to divide any Nationalist counter-attack and to offer fewer targets for bombing and strafing than at Brunete.

== Republican offensive ==
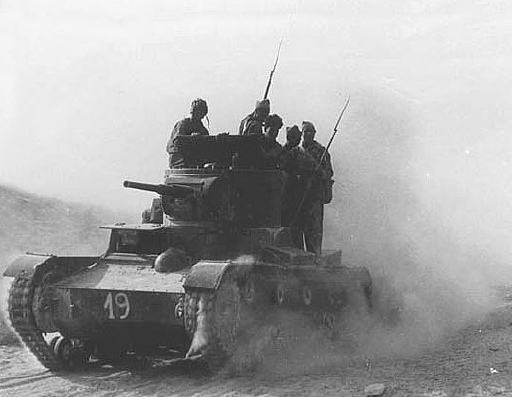
Republican International Brigadiers with T-26 tank

The Republican Army of the East, together with the XI and XV International Brigades, started its offensive with eighty thousand men, six aviation squadrons with Polikarpov I-16 (moscas), Polikarpov I-15 (chatos), SB-2 bombers (Kathiuskas), R-Z and R-5 smaller bombers (Natachas and Rasantes) (200 aeroplanes in total) and one hundred and five T-26 tanks in three main and five secondary directions on a one hundred-kilometre stretch between Zuera and Belchite. On the first two fronts (north and centre), the Republicans managed to take only vacant territories. On the southern portion of the front, the Republican Army took the villages of La Puebla de Albortón, Codo, Mediana during the two first days and the bigger town of Quinto was taken on the fourth day of the offensive. In the tiny village of Codo, there was one Requeté company, the Tercio of Montserrat, and 40 falangists that tied down two Republican brigades for two days. The fiercest resistance was encountered in Belchite, where close to five thousand Nationalist defenders (2273 military and around 2600 civilians, including women, children and elder) resisted until 6 September in the surrounded town when Republicans took it. Logistic failures and lack of coordination between different brigades and commanders in Republican side delayed the planned surprise attack on Zaragoza, allowing the Nationalists to bring up reinforcements. When Republican commanders saw their offensive slowing down, they decided to take Belchite to raise morale, but it resisted longer than expected. This and later delays, such as the failed massive attack with tanks on Fuentes de Ebro in October 1937, made the full-scale offensive on Zaragoza fail, after more than two months of combats.

== Nationalist counteroffensive ==
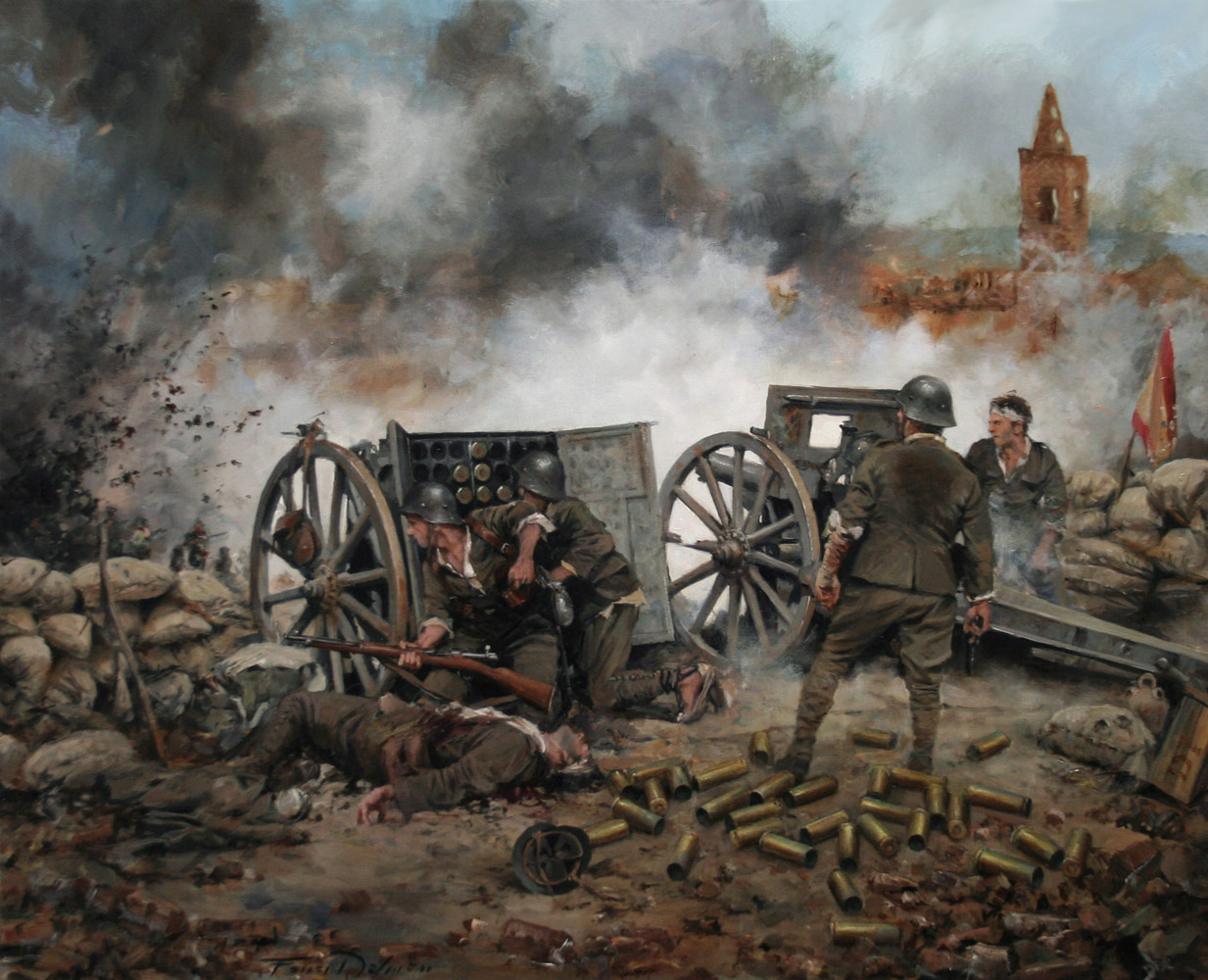
Painting of Battle by Augusto Ferrer-Dalmau

With five Nationalist divisions whereof two were withdrawn from the Madrid front, artillery and more than 100 Fiat CR.32, Heinkel He 46, Savoia-Marchetti SM.81 , Junkers Ju 52, Fiat Br.20 (Cicogna), and Heinkel He 51, the Nationalist counter offensive on the town Belchite started on 30 August and ended on 6 September, when they allowed the last defenders of Belchite to stop fighting and try to escape. The Nationalist ground troops were unable to break Republican lines surrounding Belchite, remaining 20 km away from the town, so the Nationalist aviation was key to prolong the resistance, by daily dropping ammunition, food and medicines with the big cargo planes Ju-52 and by efficiently bombing Republican positions around and within Belchite. German Legion Condor was of big importance, their fast plane Heinkel He 70 (Rayo) took daily photographs of Republican positions, helping to the destruction of many of their batteries. The Nationalist counteroffensive to defend Zaragoza continued until the beginning of November, with hard combats around Mediana, Fuentes de Ebro and Vertice Sillero.

== Aftermath ==
Although the Republicans gained some initial success and managed to push the front line twenty kilometres deeper into Nationalist territory, both of the main objectives of the offensive failed. The Nationalists did not postpone their big offensive in the north, as they had done before the Battle of Brunete, and the attempt to capture Zaragoza failed.

== Ruins as national monument ==
The town was partially destroyed, but instead of rebuilding it, Franco, who reconquered the town in March 11, 1938, after Nationalist intensive bombing and artillery barrage, ordered that the ruins were left untouched as a "living" monument to the destruction caused by the Red Army, although both armies contributed. A new town was constructed near the former. The holes and caves in Lobo Hill south of Belchite from where the Spanish Republican artillery positions fired towards what is now Belchite Old Town have been preserved and are open to visitors, as well as the Nationalist positions of El Saso and Seminar.

== See also ==
- List of Spanish Republican military equipment of the Spanish Civil War
- List of Spanish Nationalist military equipment of the Spanish Civil War
- Corbera d'Ebre

== Sources ==
- Hugh Thomas (2001). The Spanish Civil War. Modern Library. ISBN 0-375-75515-2.
- Antony Beevor (2006). The Battle for Spain. The Orion Publishing Grour. pp. 297–301. ISBN 0-2978-4832-1.
