= Belchite =

- Municipality
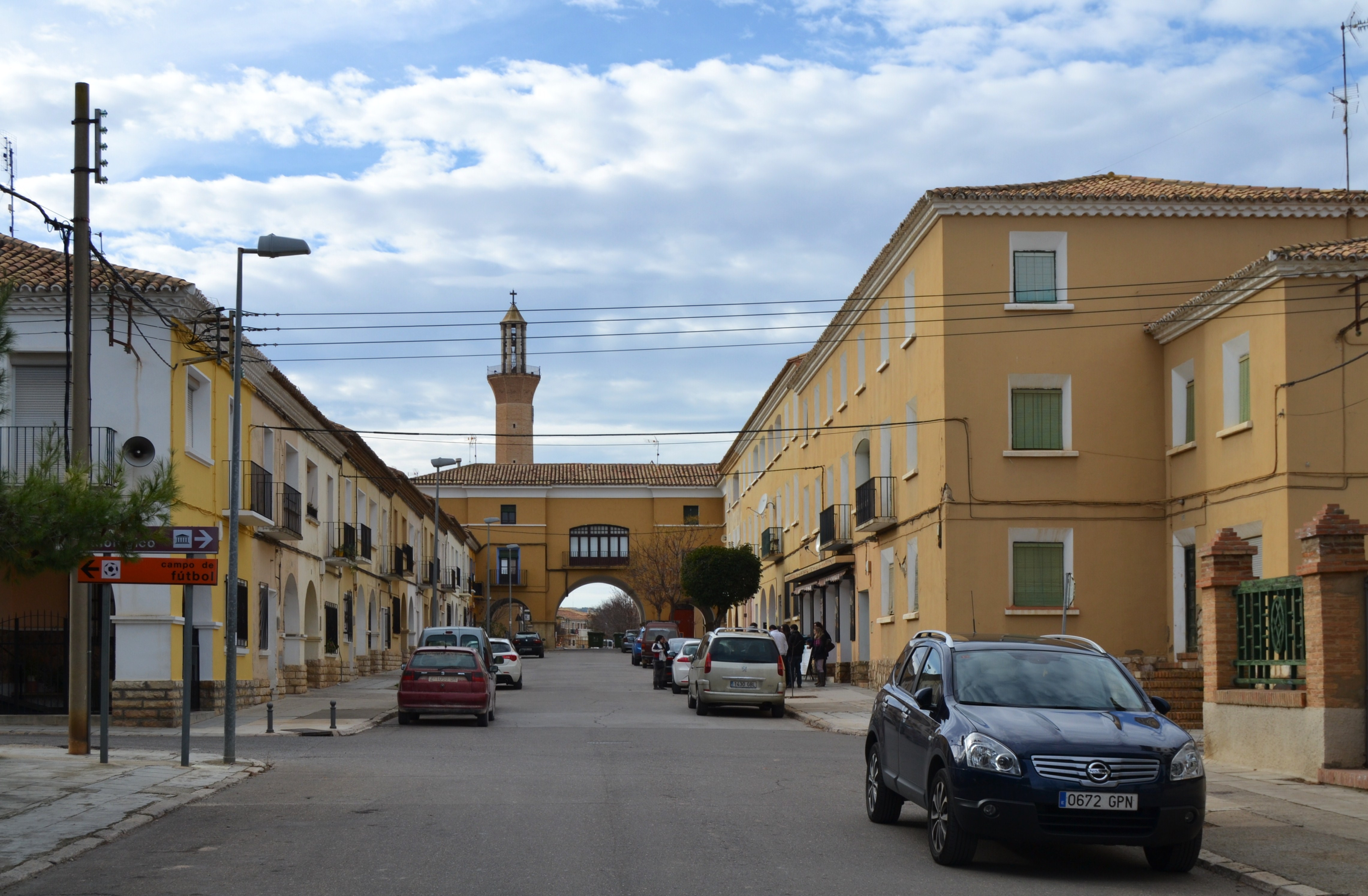
- The modern town

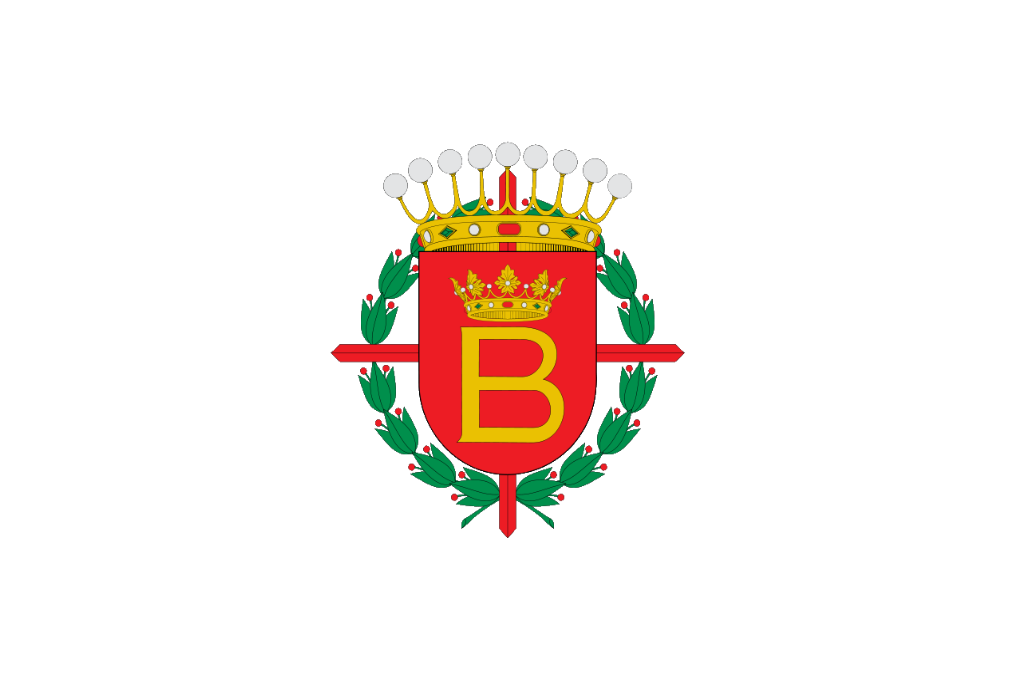
- Flag Coat of arms

- Location in Spain
- Coordinates: 41°18′23″N 0°45′15″W
- Country: Spain
- Autonomous community: Aragon
- Province: Zaragoza
- Comarca: Campo de Belchite
- Judicial district: Zaragoza

Government
  - Mayor: Angeles Ortiz Álvarez (PSOE)

Area
  - Total: 273.7 km^{2} (105.7 sq mi)
- Elevation: 440 m (1,440 ft)

Population (2025-01-01)
  - Total: 1,495
  - Density: 5.462/km^{2} (14.15/sq mi)
- Demonym: Belchitanos
- Time zone: UTC+1 (CET)
  - Summer (DST): UTC+2 (CEST)
- Postal code: 50130
- Dialing code: 976
- Climate: BSk

Belchite is a municipality and town in the province of Zaragoza, Spain, about 40 km southeast of Zaragoza. It is the capital of Campo de Belchite comarca (administrative region) and is located in a plain surrounded by low hills, the highest of which is Lobo.

In 1122, Alfonso the Battler founded the Confraternity of Belchite to defend the frontier between the Christian kingdoms and al-Andalus. On 15 June 1809, during the Peninsular War French and Spanish forces fought in the Battle of María near the town. Between 24 August and 7 September 1937, during the Spanish Civil War, loyalist Spanish Republican forces fought Francisco Franco's rebel forces in the Battle of Belchite in and around the town. After 1939, a new town was built near the ruins of the old one, which remains a ghost town as a memorial to the war.

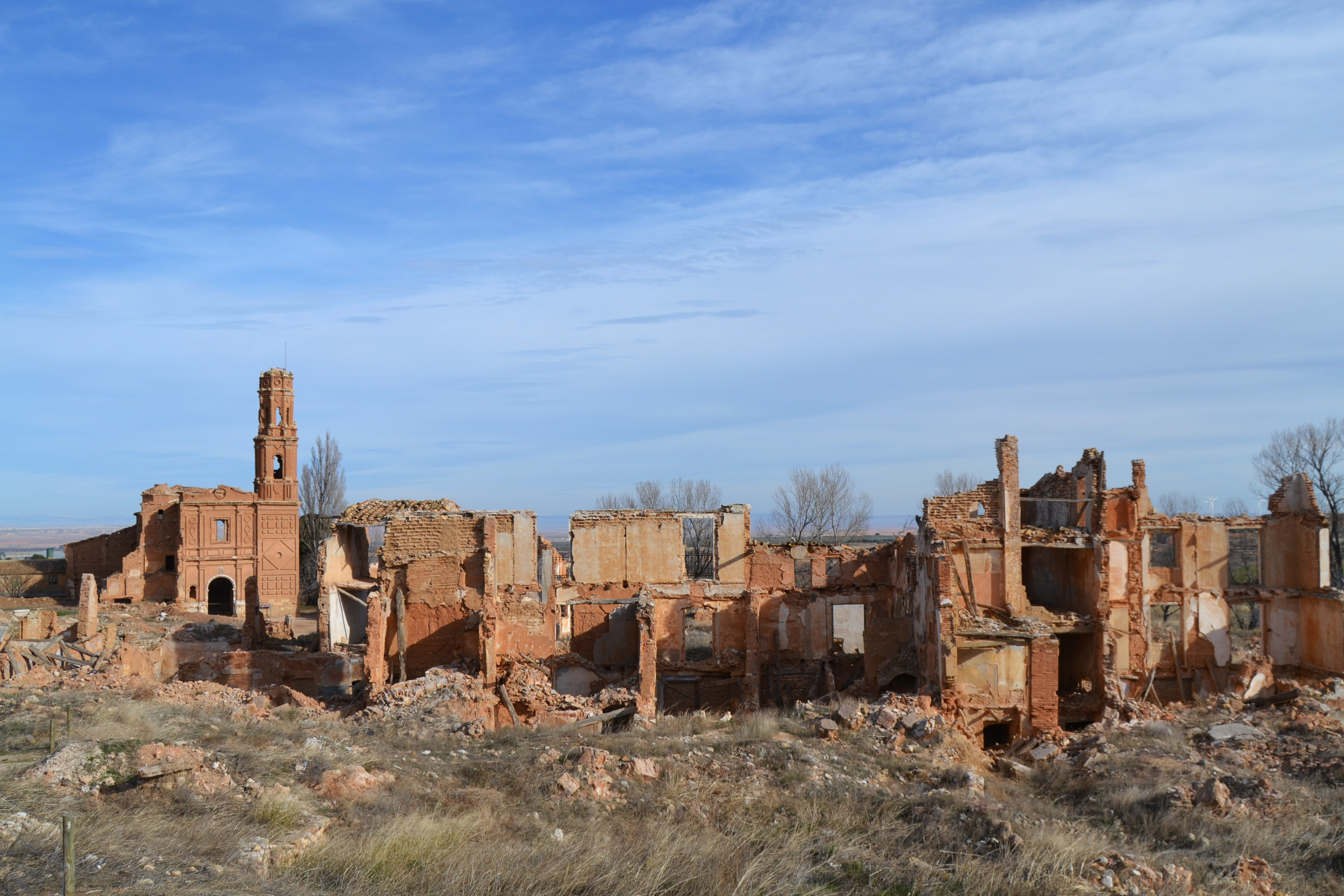
Ruins of the former town of Belchite

The ruins of the old village have been used as a filming location in films including Terry Gilliam's 1988 film The Adventures of Baron Munchausen and Guillermo del Toro's Pan's Labyrinth. It also appeared as a location in season 3 of The Walking Dead: Daryl Dixon with part of an episode taking place in the ruins.

== See also ==
- List of municipalities in Zaragoza
