= Ernesto Milá =

Spanish political activist

- Born: 1952 (age 73–74); Barcelona, Spain
- Occupations: Political activist, blogger

Ernesto Milá Rodríguez (born 1952) is a Spanish far-right political activist.

== Early years ==
Born in Barcelona to a Catalan father belonging to the Penedès rural community and an Extremaduran immigrant mother (herself the daughter of a Republican military officer), Milá began his political activity as one of the members of the fringe right-wing extremist groups (usually named incontrolados, "uncontrolled elements") who rallied against leftist or pro-democratic meetings during late Francoism, usually assuming the role of unofficial mob breakers and violent counter-rioters. His political affiliation began in the relatively short-lived neonazi group Partido Español Nacional Socialista (PENS).

As Xavier Casals Meseguer explains in Los Neonazis en España (Editorial Grijalbo, 1995), the PENS terrorist attacks on the headquarters of El Ciervo (a relatively center-leaning Catholic journal), theTaller Picasso (1971), Catalan libraries (such as the Cinc d'Oros, 1971), the Gran enciclopédia catalana (1974) and libraries and public centers in Valencia (1975), among others, were not prosecuted—mainly due to the fact that the Francoist police and the SECED itself, along with a former member of Franco's bodyguard corps (Luis García Rodríguez, later founder of the neo-Nazi group Estado Nacional Europeo), provided active support for said actions.

Milá then became a member of the Círculo José Antonio in Barcelona, subsequently entering Blas Piñar's Fuerza Nueva (1975), from which he was expelled in 1977, mostly on the grounds of his recent civil marriage; he then joined the Fuerza Nueva splinter group Frente Nacional de la Juventud founded by Ramón Graells Bofill, which later merged into the Youth Front.

In June 1980, an illegal gathering dubbed Día de la Patria Española and organized by Milá on behalf of the Youth Front, ended with the assault and arson of the Barcelona Union of the Democratic Centre (UCD) headquarters. The Barcelona Supreme Court ruled that Milá was the main inductor of the demonstration and sentenced him in absentia to a two-year prison sentence. This formal indictment forced Milá to flee for France. In Paris he contributed to a neofascist magazine entitled Confidentiel founded by the Italian far-right activist Stefano Delle Chiaie in 1979. In addition there Milá was investigated in connection with the Copernicus street synagogue bombing in Paris, which claimed four lives. He was sentenced to three months imprisonment in La Santé for his use of forged documents. During his time in prison, he wrote an apology letter to Blas Piñar in which he assured his return to the Catholic faith, as shown in the documents compiled by Piñar himself in Escrito para la historia (Fuerza Nueva Editorial, 2000).

In January 1981, during Milá's absence, more than thirty militants of the Frente de la Juventud were arrested by the police, and accused of terrorist activities, among them a bombing in Madrid which killed one person and wounded nine others. The party officially dissolved 29 August 1982.

== Bolivia and prison sentences ==
From France, he departed to Latin America, where he engaged in (mostly undisclosed) collaboration with a number of activists and regimes of probably diverging political obedience. As he admitted himself in his interview with Manuel Vázquez Montalbán, during his stay in Bolivia he worked as an adviser (most likely on PSYOPS or plain torture) for the short-lived dictatorship of Luis García Meza along with neo-fascists such as Stefano delle Chiaie and Nazi war criminal Klaus Barbie, later returning to Spain in 1983.

Upon his return, he was arrested by the police at the Spanish frontier with Ingram machine guns in his possession, indicted on firearms and illegal demonstration charges and sentenced to two years in prison.

The 22 February 1983 edition of El País informed of his formal confinement in the Carabanchel prison, along with that of Rafael Tormo Acosta, after the aforementioned arrest. The 14 April article in El País even qualified Milá's wife's written plea on behalf of her husband as "pathetic".

The 3 October 1985 issue of El País informed of a new arrest, this time in the streets of Barcelona, and his immediate confinement in the Modelo Prison, in order to execute his pending sentence for the 1980 incidents in the UCD headquarters.

== Recent history ==
Upon release from prison, Milà founded the Dissidencias journal, after having participated in forming Juntas Españolas along with the El Alcázar director, Antonio Izquierdo. During that time he directed Ediciones Alternativa, which published the first translations of the works of the Italian esoterist and fascist ideologue Julius Evola, one of whose career highlights was the book "Revolt Against the Modern World".

In 2000 he became a militant of the umbrella far-right group Democracia Nacional, already a haven for CEDADE ex-members (such as Christian Ruiz Reguant, Laureano Luna or Joaquín Bochaca) and other Spanish neo-Nazis. In 2004 Milà disenfranchised himself from DN after bitter disagreements with its leader, Manuel Canduela.

His attention then turned to Spain 2000, the controversial far-right platform linked to the Asociación Nacional de Empresarios de Locales de Alterne or ANELA, Spain's largest pimp syndicate (see Los Amos de la prostitución en España by Joan Cantarero (Ediciones B, 2007)). Milá was recently appointed as the party's press secretary, and appeared in the election list for the 2008 General Election, ostensibly an attempt to gain preponderance over other fascist groups in Spain by capitalizing on Milá's extensive history. Milá's presumed relation with the CNI and its predecessors, albeit not as yet admitted by him, has raised an outcry in most far-right blogs, especially those of Democracia Nacional and the currently marginal entourage of the once infamous Ricardo Saenz de Ynestrillas, who had a row with Milá himself although the latter decided not to press charges.

Widely considered the most intellectually ambitious and well-connected of all Spanish neo-fascists who have escaped successful or permanent legal prosecution, Milá is nowadays devoted to "cultural" dissertations in his blog on Julius Evola, theosophy, Esoteric Nazism, purportedly "mysterious" aspects of History (such Catharism, Freemasonry and unknown or "intriguing" aspects of Barcelona or Gaudí's legacy) and other subjects, most notably surveillance and security. He also uses the blog to extend on his particular view of contemporary topics, such as immigration, as well as to occasionally write film reviews. He has worked jointly with a number of printed and electronic media, with special attention towards esoterism and the occult. His orientation towards these themes has been the object of many a controversy with other journalists He also published in journals such as El Alcázar and Defensa, Más allá de la ciencia, Año Cero, Próximo Milenio, Nueva Dimensión and Historia y Vida, some of them also including articles by historic militants of CEDADE. The information in the articles written by Milá and published in his blog is often inconsistent with the known historical facts (e.g. assuming that it was William the Conqueror, and not Harold Godwinson, who defeated Harald III of Norway at the Battle of "Stanford" (sic) Bridge), or punctuated by facts and rumors of which he does seldom presents a proof, such as the different conspiracies whose confluence led to the 1981 coup attempt in Spain.

He was the chief editor of the Saber Más magazine, distributed in 1997 with the El Mundo edition in Catalunya—the relation between mainstream, purportedly center-right communication media such as El Mundo, Telemadrid, ABC or the COPE with former or rumoured neo-Nazi activists has long been a matter of controversy.

He then became chief editor for Nuevos Horizontes, directed by notorious "occultist" Sebastià d'Arbó, and then for the (In)Seguridad magazine. He is currently the editor of the Revista IdentidaD.

His current line of thought is overtly critical towards Catalan nationalists, whom he accuses of ignoring or even disparaging the Spanish immigration of the 60s and 70s, from whence he partially descends, while being oblivious of the “cultural and anthropological gap” with respect to more recent immigrants (itself another staple in his blog articles).
