= Madrid (Congress of Deputies constituency) =

Electoral constituency in Spain

Coordinates: 40°30′N 3°40′W

- Congress of Deputies; Electoral constituency
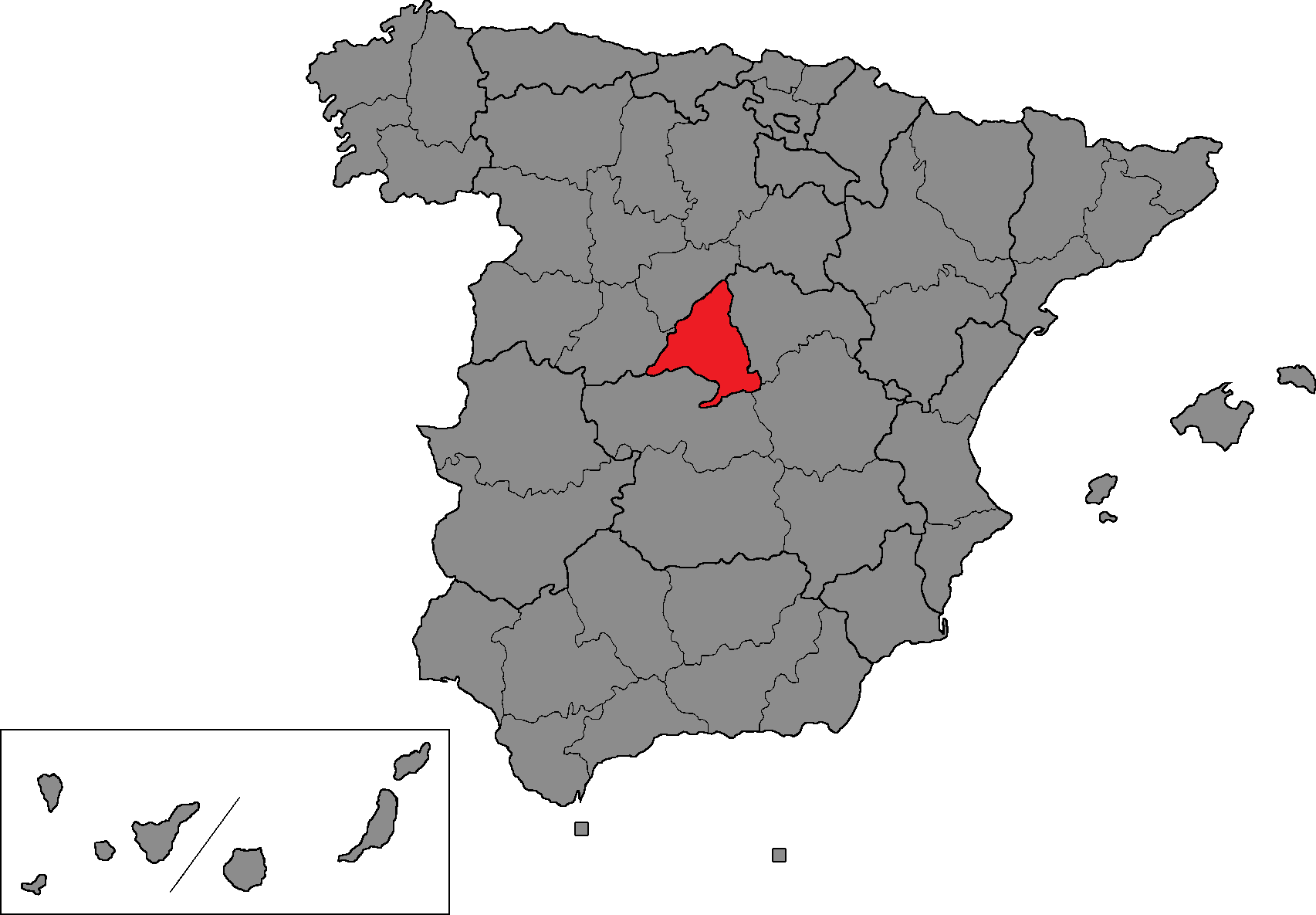
- Location of Madrid within Spain
- Province: Madrid
- Autonomous community: Community of Madrid
- Population: ▲7,001,715 (2024)
- Electorate: ▲5,224,561 (2023)
- Major settlements: Madrid, Móstoles, Alcalá de Henares, Fuenlabrada, Leganés, Getafe, Alcorcón, Torrejón de Ardoz, Parla, Alcobendas

Current constituency
- Created: 1977
- Seats: 32 (1977–1986); 33 (1986–1993); 34 (1993–2004); 35 (2004–2011); 36 (2011–2019); 37 (2019–present)
- Members: PP (16); PSOE (10); Sumar (5); Vox (5); Podemos (1)

Madrid is one of the 52 constituencies represented in the Congress of Deputies, the lower chamber of the Spanish parliament, the Cortes Generales. The constituency (whose boundaries correspond to those of the homonymous province) currently elects 37 deputies. The electoral system uses the D'Hondt method and closed-list proportional voting, with a minimum threshold of three percent.

== Electoral system ==
The constituency was created as per the Political Reform Law and was first contested in the 1977 general election. The Law provided for the provinces of Spain to be established as multi-member districts in the Congress of Deputies, with this regulation being maintained under the Spanish Constitution of 1978. Additionally, the Constitution requires for any modification of the provincial limits to be approved under an organic law, needing an absolute majority in the Cortes Generales.

Voting is based on universal suffrage, comprising all Spanish nationals over 18 years of age with full political rights, provided that they have not been deprived of the right to vote by a final sentence. The only exception was in 1977, when this was limited to nationals over 21 years of age and in full enjoyment of their political and civil rights. Amendments in 2011 required non-resident citizens to apply for voting, a system known as "begged" voting (Spanish: Voto rogado). which was abolished in 2022. Further, amendments in 2018 granted the right to vote to those legally incapacitated. The Congress of Deputies has a minimum of 300 and a maximum of 400 seats, with electoral provisions fixing its size at 350. Of these, 348 are elected in 50 multi-member constituencies corresponding to the provinces of Spain—each of which is assigned an initial minimum of two seats and the remaining 248 distributed in proportion to population—using the D'Hondt method and closed-list proportional voting, with a three percent-threshold of valid votes (including blank ballots) in each constituency. The remaining two seats are allocated to Ceuta and Melilla as single-member districts elected by plurality voting. The use of this electoral method may result in a higher effective threshold depending on district magnitude and vote distribution. The law does not provide for by-elections to fill vacant seats; instead, any vacancies arising after the proclamation of candidates and during the legislative term are filled by the next candidates on the party lists or, when required, by designated substitutes.

The electoral law allows for parties and federations registered in the interior ministry, alliances and groupings of electors to present lists of candidates. Parties and federations intending to form an alliance are required to inform the relevant electoral commission within 10 days of the election call—15 before 1985—whereas groupings of electors need to secure the signature of at least one percent of the electorate in the constituencies for which they seek election—one permille of the electorate, with a compulsory minimum of 500 signatures, until 1985—disallowing electors from signing for more than one list. Also since 2011, parties, federations or alliances that have not obtained a mandate in either chamber of the Cortes at the preceding election are required to secure the signature of at least 0.1 percent of electors in the aforementioned constituencies. Amendments in 2007 required a balanced composition of men and women in the electoral lists, so that candidates of either sex made up at least 40 percent of the total composition; further amendments in 2024 required the use of a zipper system.

== Deputies ==
Deputies 1977–present
Key to parties PCE IU U. Podemos Podemos Sumar PSP Más País PSOE UPyD CDS Cs UCD PP CP CD AP Vox UN
Legislature	Election	Distribution
Constituent	1977	4 / 3 / 11 / 11 / 3
1st	1979	4 / 12 / 12 / 3 / 1
2nd	1982	1 / 18 / 1 / 1 / 11
3rd	1986	2 / 15 / 5 / 11
4th	1989	5 / 12 / 4 / 12
5th	1993	5 / 13 / 16
6th	1996	6 / 11 / 17
7th	2000	3 / 12 / 19
8th	2004	2 / 16 / 17
9th	2008	1 / 15 / 1 / 18
10th	2011	3 / 10 / 4 / 19
11th	2015	2 / 8 / 6 / 7 / 13
12th	2016	8 / 7 / 6 / 15
13th	2019 (Apr)	6 / 11 / 8 / 7 / 5
14th	2019 (Nov)	5 / 2 / 10 / 3 / 10 / 7
15th	2023	6 / 10 / 16 / 5

== General elections ==
=== 2026 ===
Summary of the 29 November 2026 Congress of Deputies election results in Madrid
Parties and alliances	Popular vote			Seats	
Parties and alliances	Votes	%	±pp	Total	+/−
People's Party (PP)					
Spanish Socialist Workers' Party (PSOE)					
Vox (Vox)					
Broad Front (FA)^{1}			n/a		
We Can (Podemos)^{1}			n/a		
Animalist Party with the Environment (PACMA)					
Workers' Front (FO)					
For a Fairer World (M+J)					
Communist Party of the Workers of Spain (PCTE)					
Humanist Party (PH)					
Spanish Phalanx of the CNSO (FE de las JONS)					
Democracy for the 21st Century (D21)			New		
Justice Europe (IE)			New		
The Party is Over (SALF)			New		
Blank ballots					
Total				38	+1
Valid votes					
Invalid votes					
Votes cast / turnout					
Abstentions					
Registered voters	5,536,913				
Sources
Footnotes: ^{1} Within the Unite alliance in the 2023 election.

=== 2023 ===
Summary of the 23 July 2023 Congress of Deputies election results in Madrid
Parties and alliances	Popular vote			Seats	
Parties and alliances	Votes	%	±pp	Total	+/−
People's Party (PP)	1,463,183	40.55	+15.64	16	+6
Spanish Socialist Workers' Party (PSOE)	1,004,599	27.84	+0.97	10	±0
Unite (Sumar)^{1}	557,780	15.46	–3.20	6	–1
Vox (Vox)	506,164	14.03	–4.31	5	–2
Animalist Party with the Environment (PACMA)^{2}	21,742	0.60	–0.30	0	±0
Workers' Front (FO)	7,652	0.21	New	0	±0
For a Fairer World (PUM+J)	6,749	0.19	+0.07	0	±0
Zero Cuts (Recortes Cero)	3,784	0.10	–0.04	0	±0
Communist Party of the Workers of Spain (PCTE)	3,407	0.09	+0.04	0	±0
Humanist Party (PH)	2,902	0.08	+0.01	0	±0
Spanish Phalanx of the CNSO (FE de las JONS)	1,751	0.05	New	0	±0
Citizens–Party of the Citizenry (Cs)	n/a	n/a	–9.07	0	–3
Blank ballots	28,960	0.80	–0.01		
Total	3,608,673			37	±0
Valid votes	3,608,673	99.15	–0.06		
Invalid votes	30,827	0.85	+0.06		
Votes cast / turnout	3,639,500	69.66	–0.93		
Abstentions	1,585,061	30.34	+0.93		
Registered voters	5,224,561				
Sources
Footnotes: ^{1} Unite results are compared to the combined totals of United We Can and More Country–Equo in the November 2019 election.; ^{2} Animalist Party with the Environment results are compared to Animalist Party Against Mistreatment of Animals totals in the November 2019 election.

=== November 2019 ===
Summary of the 10 November 2019 Congress of Deputies election results in Madrid
Parties and alliances	Popular vote			Seats	
Parties and alliances	Votes	%	±pp	Total	+/−
Spanish Socialist Workers' Party (PSOE)	957,401	26.87	–0.40	10	–1
People's Party (PP)	887,474	24.91	+6.27	10	+3
Vox (Vox)	653,476	18.34	+4.48	7	+2
United We Can (Podemos–IU)	463,629	13.01	–3.22	5	–1
Citizens–Party of the Citizenry (Cs)	323,076	9.07	–11.88	3	–5
More Country–Equo (Más País–Equo)	201,389	5.65	New	2	+2
Animalist Party Against Mistreatment of Animals (PACMA)	31,983	0.90	–0.45	0	±0
Zero Cuts–Green Group–PCAS–TC (Recortes Cero–GV–PCAS–TC)	5,129	0.14	–0.06	0	±0
For a Fairer World (PUM+J)	4,305	0.12	–0.02	0	±0
Humanist Party (PH)	2,508	0.07	–0.02	0	±0
Communist Party of the Peoples of Spain (PCPE)	2,099	0.06	+0.01	0	±0
Communist Party of the Workers of Spain (PCTE)	1,895	0.05	–0.01	0	±0
Blank ballots	28,783	0.81	+0.16		
Total	3,563,147			37	±0
Valid votes	3,563,147	99.21	+0.05		
Invalid votes	28,317	0.79	–0.05		
Votes cast / turnout	3,591,464	70.59	–4.87		
Abstentions	1,496,629	29.41	+4.87		
Registered voters	5,088,093				

=== April 2019 ===
Summary of the 28 April 2019 Congress of Deputies election results in Madrid
Parties and alliances	Popular vote			Seats	
Parties and alliances	Votes	%	±pp	Total	+/−
Spanish Socialist Workers' Party (PSOE)	1,031,534	27.27	+7.70	11	+4
Citizens–Party of the Citizenry (Cs)	792,203	20.95	+3.16	8	+2
People's Party (PP)	705,119	18.64	–19.61	7	–8
United We Can (Podemos–IU–Equo)	613,911	16.23	–5.06	6	–2
Vox (Vox)	524,176	13.86	+13.38	5	+5
Animalist Party Against Mistreatment of Animals (PACMA)	50,909	1.35	+0.22	0	±0
Act (PACT)	19,208	0.51	New	0	±0
Zero Cuts–Green Group–PCAS–TC (Recortes Cero–GV–PCAS–TC)	7,512	0.20	–0.01	0	±0
For a Fairer World (PUM+J)	5,221	0.14	New	0	±0
Humanist Party (PH)	3,456	0.09	+0.03	0	±0
Communist Party of the Workers of Spain (PCTE)	2,329	0.06	New	0	±0
Communist Party of the Peoples of Spain (PCPE)	2,038	0.05	–0.04	0	±0
Blank ballots	24,631	0.65	+0.13		
Total	3,782,247			37	+1
Valid votes	3,782,247	99.16	–0.16		
Invalid votes	32,112	0.84	+0.16		
Votes cast / turnout	3,814,359	75.46	+4.65		
Abstentions	1,240,596	24.54	–4.65		
Registered voters	5,054,955				

=== 2016 ===
Summary of the 26 June 2016 Congress of Deputies election results in Madrid
Parties and alliances	Popular vote			Seats	
Parties and alliances	Votes	%	±pp	Total	+/−
People's Party (PP)	1,325,665	38.25	+4.81	15	+2
United We Can (Podemos–IU–Equo–CLI–AS)^{1}	737,885	21.29	–4.95	8	–2
Spanish Socialist Workers' Party (PSOE)	678,340	19.57	+1.73	7	+1
Citizens–Party of the Citizenry (C's)	616,503	17.79	–1.03	6	–1
Animalist Party Against Mistreatment of Animals (PACMA)	39,117	1.13	+0.35	0	±0
Vox (Vox)	16,803	0.48	–0.15	0	±0
Union, Progress and Democracy (UPyD)	14,659	0.42	–0.78	0	±0
Zero Cuts–Green Group (Recortes Cero–GV)	7,377	0.21	+0.10	0	±0
Spanish Phalanx of the CNSO (FE de las JONS)	3,946	0.11	–0.02	0	±0
Communist Party of the Peoples of Spain (PCPE)	3,110	0.09	+0.04	0	±0
Humanist Party (PH)	2,148	0.06	+0.01	0	±0
Libertarian Party (P–LIB)	1,111	0.03	±0.00	0	±0
Internationalist Solidarity and Self-Management (SAIn)	994	0.03	±0.00	0	±0
Blank ballots	18,137	0.52	±0.00		
Total	3,465,795			36	±0
Valid votes	3,465,795	99.32	–0.04		
Invalid votes	23,581	0.68	+0.04		
Votes cast / turnout	3,489,376	70.81	–3.31		
Abstentions	1,438,556	29.19	+3.31		
Registered voters	4,927,932				
Sources
Footnotes: ^{1} United We Can results are compared to the combined totals of We Can and United Left–Popular Unity in Common in the 2015 election.

=== 2015 ===
Summary of the 20 December 2015 Congress of Deputies election results in Madrid
Parties and alliances	Popular vote			Seats	
Parties and alliances	Votes	%	±pp	Total	+/−
People's Party (PP)	1,210,219	33.44	–17.53	13	–6
We Can (Podemos)	756,257	20.90	New	8	+8
Citizens–Party of the Citizenry (C's)	681,167	18.82	New	7	+7
Spanish Socialist Workers' Party (PSOE)	645,645	17.84	–8.21	6	–4
United Left–Popular Unity in Common (IU–UPeC)	190,193	5.26	–2.78	2	–1
Union, Progress and Democracy (UPyD)	43,508	1.20	–9.10	0	–4
Animalist Party Against Mistreatment of Animals (PACMA)	28,322	0.78	+0.39	0	±0
Vox (Vox)	22,643	0.63	New	0	±0
For the Left–The Greens (X Izda)	4,994	0.14	New	0	±0
Spanish Phalanx of the CNSO (FE de las JONS)	4,579	0.13	New	0	±0
Zero Cuts–Green Group (Recortes Cero–GV)	4,037	0.11	New	0	±0
For a Fairer World (PUM+J)	2,870	0.08	–0.08	0	±0
Humanist Party (PH)	1,779	0.05	–0.03	0	±0
Communist Party of the Peoples of Spain (PCPE)	1,742	0.05	–0.06	0	±0
Internationalist Solidarity and Self-Management (SAIn)	1,137	0.03	–0.01	0	±0
Libertarian Party (P–LIB)	1,075	0.03	–0.02	0	±0
Blank ballots	18,751	0.52	–0.52		
Total	3,618,918			36	±0
Valid votes	3,618,918	99.36	+0.40		
Invalid votes	23,209	0.64	–0.40		
Votes cast / turnout	3,642,127	74.12	+0.86		
Abstentions	1,271,766	25.88	–0.86		
Registered voters	4,913,893				

=== 2011 ===
Summary of the 20 November 2011 Congress of Deputies election results in Madrid
Parties and alliances	Popular vote			Seats	
Parties and alliances	Votes	%	±pp	Total	+/−
People's Party (PP)	1,719,709	50.97	+1.78	19	+1
Spanish Socialist Workers' Party (PSOE)	878,724	26.05	–13.63	10	–5
Union, Progress and Democracy (UPyD)	347,354	10.30	+6.56	4	+3
United Left–The Greens: Plural Left (IU–LV)	271,209	8.04	+3.38	3	+2
Equo (Equo)	65,169	1.93	New	0	±0
Animalist Party Against Mistreatment of Animals (PACMA)	13,136	0.39	+0.26	0	±0
Blank Seats (EB)	12,877	0.38	New	0	±0
Asturias Forum (FAC)	6,645	0.20	New	0	±0
For a Fairer World (PUM+J)	5,314	0.16	+0.09	0	±0
Anti-capitalists (Anticapitalistas)	4,268	0.13	New	0	±0
Communist Party of the Peoples of Spain (PCPE)	3,815	0.11	+0.05	0	±0
Humanist Party (PH)	2,706	0.08	–0.05	0	±0
Republicans (RPS)	2,183	0.06	New	0	±0
Internationalist Socialist Workers' Party (POSI)	1,723	0.05	+0.01	0	±0
Individual Freedom Party (P–LIB)	1,655	0.05	New	0	±0
Internationalist Solidarity and Self-Management (SAIn)	1,350	0.04	+0.03	0	±0
Communist Unification of Spain (UCE)	875	0.03	New	0	±0
Blank ballots	35,093	1.04	+0.09		
Total	3,373,805			36	+1
Valid votes	3,373,805	98.96	–0.52		
Invalid votes	35,526	1.04	+0.52		
Votes cast / turnout	3,409,331	73.26	–5.82		
Abstentions	1,244,448	26.74	+5.82		
Registered voters	4,653,779				

=== 2008 ===
Summary of the 9 March 2008 Congress of Deputies election results in Madrid
Parties and alliances	Popular vote			Seats	
Parties and alliances	Votes	%	±pp	Total	+/−
People's Party (PP)	1,737,688	49.19	+4.17	18	+1
Spanish Socialist Workers' Party (PSOE)	1,401,785	39.68	–4.43	15	–1
United Left of the Community of Madrid–Alternative (IUCM)	164,595	4.66	–1.77	1	–1
Union, Progress and Democracy (UPyD)	132,095	3.74	New	1	+1
The Greens–Green Group (LV–GV)	10,875	0.31	New	0	±0
The Greens of the Community of Madrid–The Greens of Europe (LVCM–LVdE)	9,925	0.28	–0.28	0	±0
Anti-Bullfighting Party Against Mistreatment of Animals (PACMA)	4,755	0.13	New	0	±0
Citizens–Party of the Citizenry (C's)	3,996	0.11	New	0	±0
Spanish Phalanx of the CNSO (FE de las JONS)	3,250	0.09	+0.01	0	±0
National Democracy (DN)	3,087	0.09	–0.03	0	±0
Citizens for Blank Votes (CenB)	2,687	0.08	–0.21	0	±0
For a Fairer World (PUM+J)	2,516	0.07	New	0	±0
Communist Party of the Peoples of Spain (PCPE)	2,130	0.06	+0.01	0	±0
Spanish Alternative (AES)	2,082	0.06	New	0	±0
Alternative in Blank (ABLA)	1,876	0.05	New	0	±0
Non-Smokers' Party (PNF)	1,616	0.05	New	0	±0
Union for Leganés (ULEG)	1,566	0.04	New	0	±0
Social Democratic Party (PSD)	1,350	0.04	New	0	±0
Internationalist Socialist Workers' Party (POSI)	1,340	0.04	+0.01	0	±0
Democratic and Social Centre (CDS)	1,248	0.04	–0.17	0	±0
Family and Life Party (PFyV)	998	0.03	–0.05	0	±0
Humanist Party (PH)	901	0.03	–0.02	0	±0
Spanish Democratic Centre (CDEs)	828	0.02	New	0	±0
Liberal Party of State Employment and Housing (PLEVE)	786	0.02	New	0	±0
Authentic Phalanx (FA)	776	0.02	–0.01	0	±0
Spain 2000 (E-2000)	764	0.02	±0.00	0	±0
Commoners' Land (TC)	611	0.02	–0.01	0	±0
Spanish Front (Frente)	552	0.02	New	0	±0
Internationalist Solidarity and Self-Management (SAIn)	434	0.01	New	0	±0
National Alliance (AN)	406	0.01	–0.02	0	±0
Carlist Party (PC)	291	0.01	±0.00	0	±0
Regionalist Party of the Leonese Country (PREPAL)	250	0.01	New	0	±0
State of Spain Unionist Party (PUEDE)	214	0.01	New	0	±0
Civil Liberties Party (PLCI)	212	0.01	New	0	±0
Internationalist Struggle (LI (LIT–CI))	183	0.01	±0.00	0	±0
European Ibero-American Alliance Party (PAIE)	174	0.00	New	0	±0
Aitch Party (PHache)	0	0.00	New	0	±0
Blank ballots	33,539	0.95	–1.11		
Total	3,532,381			35	±0
Valid votes	3,532,381	99.48	–0.02		
Invalid votes	18,477	0.52	+0.02		
Votes cast / turnout	3,550,858	79.08	+0.15		
Abstentions	939,182	20.92	–0.15		
Registered voters	4,490,040				

=== 2004 ===
Summary of the 14 March 2004 Congress of Deputies election results in Madrid
Parties and alliances	Popular vote			Seats	
Parties and alliances	Votes	%	±pp	Total	+/−
People's Party (PP)	1,576,636	45.02	–7.50	17	–2
Spanish Socialist Workers' Party (PSOE)	1,544,676	44.11	+11.05	16	+4
United Left of the Community of Madrid (IUCM)	225,109	6.43	–2.69	2	–1
The Greens of the Community of Madrid (LVCM)	19,600	0.56	–0.12	0	±0
The Eco-pacifist Greens (LVEP)	15,984	0.46	New	0	±0
Citizens for Blank Votes (CenB)	9,990	0.29	New	0	±0
Democratic and Social Centre (CDS)	7,528	0.21	+0.10	0	±0
National Democracy (DN)	4,036	0.12	New	0	±0
Family and Life Party (PFyV)	2,888	0.08	New	0	±0
Spanish Phalanx of the CNSO (FE de las JONS)^{1}	2,676	0.08	+0.03	0	±0
Alliance for Development and Nature (ADN)	2,215	0.06	New	0	±0
Party of Self-employed, Retirees and Widows (PAE)	2,082	0.06	+0.02	0	±0
The Phalanx (FE)	1,943	0.06	±0.00	0	±0
Humanist Party (PH)	1,770	0.05	–0.02	0	±0
Communist Party of the Peoples of Spain (PCPE)	1,746	0.05	–0.04	0	±0
Republican Left (IR)	1,530	0.04	New	0	±0
Another Democracy is Possible (ODeP)	1,302	0.04	New	0	±0
Romantic Mutual Support Party (PMAR)	1,211	0.03	New	0	±0
Commoners' Land–Castilian Nationalist Party (TC–PNC)	1,029	0.03	–0.01	0	±0
Spanish Democratic Party (PADE)	1,024	0.03	–0.01	0	±0
Alliance for National Unity (AUN)	923	0.03	New	0	±0
Authentic Phalanx (FA)	909	0.03	New	0	±0
Internationalist Socialist Workers' Party (POSI)	892	0.03	–0.03	0	±0
Republican Social Movement (MSR)	684	0.02	New	0	±0
Spain 2000 (E–2000)	528	0.02	±0.00	0	±0
Liberal Centrist Union (UCL)	410	0.01	New	0	±0
Carlist Party (PC)	238	0.01	±0.00	0	±0
Internationalist Struggle (LI (LIT–CI))	181	0.01	±0.00	0	±0
Blank ballots	72,038	2.06	+0.18		
Total	3,501,778			35	+1
Valid votes	3,501,778	99.50	+0.02		
Invalid votes	17,465	0.50	–0.02		
Votes cast / turnout	3,519,243	78.93	+6.85		
Abstentions	939,297	21.07	–6.85		
Registered voters	4,458,540				
Sources
Footnotes: ^{1} Spanish Phalanx of the CNSO results are compared to Independent Spanish Phalanx–Phalanx 2000 totals in the 2000 election.

=== 2000 ===
Summary of the 12 March 2000 Congress of Deputies election results in Madrid
Parties and alliances	Popular vote			Seats	
Parties and alliances	Votes	%	±pp	Total	+/−
People's Party (PP)	1,625,831	52.52	+3.23	19	+2
Spanish Socialist Workers' Party–Progressives (PSOE–p)	1,023,212	33.06	+1.64	12	+1
United Left of the Community of Madrid (IUCM)	282,180	9.12	–7.32	3	–3
Liberal Independent Group (GIL)	32,432	1.05	New	0	±0
The Greens (LV)	24,372	0.79	+0.63	0	±0
The Greens of the Community of Madrid (LVCM)	21,087	0.68	+0.43	0	±0
Centrist Union–Democratic and Social Centre (UC–CDS)	3,557	0.11	–0.26	0	±0
Communist Party of the Peoples of Spain (PCPE)	2,836	0.09	+0.04	0	±0
Party of Self-employed, Retirees and Independents (EL–PAPI)	2,336	0.08	New	0	±0
Humanist Party (PH)	2,050	0.07	+0.03	0	±0
The Phalanx (FE)	1,955	0.06	New	0	±0
Internationalist Socialist Workers' Party (POSI)	1,757	0.06	New	0	±0
Party Association of Widows and Legal Wives (PAVIEL)	1,690	0.05	New	0	±0
Independent Spanish Phalanx–Phalanx 2000 (FEI–FE 2000)	1,469	0.05	+0.02	0	±0
Madrilenian Independent Regional Party (PRIM)	1,363	0.04	–0.01	0	±0
Spanish Democratic Party (PADE)	1,306	0.04	New	0	±0
Commoners' Land–Castilian Nationalist Party (TC–PNC)	1,264	0.04	New	0	±0
Natural Law Party (PLN)	1,263	0.04	New	0	±0
Party of Self-employed, Retirees and Widows (PAE)	1,194	0.04	New	0	±0
Republican Action (AR)	1,089	0.04	+0.02	0	±0
Spain 2000 Platform (ES2000)	773	0.02	New	0	±0
Liberal and Social Democratic Coalition (CSD–L)	650	0.02	New	0	±0
Federal Progressives (PF)	609	0.02	New	0	±0
Iberian Union (UNIB)	388	0.01	New	0	±0
Carlist Party (PC)	384	0.01	New	0	±0
Internationalist Struggle (LI (LIT–CI))	306	0.01	New	0	±0
Blank ballots	58,114	1.88	+0.62		
Total	3,095,467			34	±0
Valid votes	3,095,467	99.48	–0.20		
Invalid votes	16,195	0.52	+0.20		
Votes cast / turnout	3,111,662	72.08	–7.51		
Abstentions	1,205,484	27.92	+7.51		
Registered voters	4,317,146				

=== 1996 ===
Summary of the 3 March 1996 Congress of Deputies election results in Madrid
Parties and alliances	Popular vote			Seats	
Parties and alliances	Votes	%	±pp	Total	+/−
People's Party (PP)	1,642,489	49.29	+5.37	17	+1
Spanish Socialist Workers' Party (PSOE)	1,046,904	31.42	–3.54	11	–2
United Left (IU)	547,901	16.44	+1.86	6	+1
The Greens–Green Group (LV–GV)	12,975	0.39	New	0	±0
Centrist Union (UC)	12,220	0.37	–2.62	0	±0
The Greens of Madrid (LVM)	8,483	0.25	New	0	±0
The European Greens–The Alternative Greens (LVE)	5,492	0.16	–0.91	0	±0
Alliance for National Unity (AUN)	1,907	0.06	New	0	±0
Madrilenian Independent Regional Party (PRIM)	1,671	0.05	–0.01	0	±0
Communist Party of the Peoples of Spain (PCPE)	1,588	0.05	New	0	±0
Humanist Party (PH)	1,495	0.04	+0.01	0	±0
Workers' Revolutionary Party (PRT)^{1}	1,339	0.04	–0.11	0	±0
Authentic Spanish Phalanx (FEA)	1,031	0.03	New	0	±0
Red–Green Party (PRV)	976	0.03	New	0	±0
Independent Spanish Phalanx (FEI)	867	0.03	–0.01	0	±0
Regionalist Party of the Leonese Country (PREPAL)	815	0.02	New	0	±0
Republican Coalition (CR)^{2}	712	0.02	±0.00	0	±0
Republican Action (AR)	656	0.02	–0.02	0	±0
Citizen Democratic Action (ADEC)	598	0.00	New	0	±0
Party of Self-employed of Spain (PAE)	0	0.00	New	0	±0
Revolutionary Workers' Party (POR)	0	0.00	–0.04	0	±0
Blank ballots	41,927	1.26	+0.28		
Total	3,332,046			34	±0
Valid votes	3,332,046	99.68	+0.07		
Invalid votes	10,582	0.32	–0.07		
Votes cast / turnout	3,342,628	79.59	+0.67		
Abstentions	857,171	20.41	–0.67		
Registered voters	4,199,799				
Sources
Footnotes: ^{1} Workers' Revolutionary Party results are compared to Workers' Socialist Party totals in the 1993 election.; ^{2} Republican Coalition results are compared to Coalition for a New Socialist Party totals in the 1993 election.

=== 1993 ===
Summary of the 6 June 1993 Congress of Deputies election results in Madrid
Parties and alliances	Popular vote			Seats	
Parties and alliances	Votes	%	±pp	Total	+/−
People's Party (PP)	1,373,042	43.92	+9.70	16	+4
Spanish Socialist Workers' Party (PSOE)	1,093,015	34.96	+1.47	13	+1
United Left (IU)	455,685	14.58	–0.84	5	±0
Democratic and Social Centre (CDS)	93,347	2.99	–8.00	0	–4
The Greens (Verdes)^{1}	33,295	1.07	–0.07	0	±0
Ruiz-Mateos Group–European Democratic Alliance (ARM–ADE)	13,782	0.44	–0.51	0	±0
The Ecologists (LE)	10,429	0.33	–0.56	0	±0
Workers' Socialist Party (PST)	4,808	0.15	–0.16	0	±0
United Extremadura (EU)	3,745	0.12	New	0	±0
Madrilenian Independent Regional Party (PRIM)^{2}	1,917	0.06	–0.07	0	±0
Spanish Phalanx of the CNSO (FE–JONS)	1,488	0.05	–0.09	0	±0
Revolutionary Workers' Party (POR)	1,391	0.04	–0.03	0	±0
Independent Spanish Phalanx (FEI)	1,212	0.04	+0.01	0	±0
Natural Law Party (PLN)	1,209	0.04	New	0	±0
Spanish Democratic Republican Action (ARDE)	1,202	0.04	±0.00	0	±0
Gray Panthers of Spain (ACI)	1,189	0.04	New	0	±0
Spanish Catholic Movement (MCE)	1,178	0.04	New	0	±0
Humanist Party (PH)	1,079	0.03	–0.04	0	±0
Commoners' Land–Castilian Nationalist Party (TC–PNC)	805	0.03	New	0	±0
Progressive Front of Spain (FPE)	641	0.02	New	0	±0
Leonese People's Union (UPL)	608	0.02	New	0	±0
Coalition for a New Socialist Party (CNPS)^{3}	529	0.02	–0.04	0	±0
Communist Unification of Spain (UCE)	0	0.00	New	0	±0
Centrist Unity–Democratic Spanish Party (PED)	0	0.00	–0.04	0	±0
Blank ballots	30,554	0.98	–0.04		
Total	3,126,150			34	+1
Valid votes	3,126,150	99.61	+0.14		
Invalid votes	12,361	0.39	–0.14		
Votes cast / turnout	3,138,511	78.92	+6.20		
Abstentions	838,551	21.08	–6.20		
Registered voters	3,977,062				
Sources
Footnotes: ^{1} The Greens results are compared to The Greens–Green List totals in the 1989 election.; ^{2} Madrilenian Independent Regional Party results are compared to Regional Party of Madrid totals in the 1989 election.; ^{3} Coalition for a New Socialist Party results are compared to Alliance for the Republic totals in the 1989 election.

=== 1989 ===
Summary of the 29 October 1989 Congress of Deputies election results in Madrid
Parties and alliances	Popular vote			Seats	
Parties and alliances	Votes	%	±pp	Total	+/−
People's Party (PP)^{1}	919,357	34.22	+2.25	12	+1
Spanish Socialist Workers' Party (PSOE)	899,723	33.49	–7.32	12	–3
United Left (IU)	414,392	15.42	+9.39	5	+3
Democratic and Social Centre (CDS)	295,189	10.99	–2.95	4	–1
The Greens–Green List (LV–LV)	30,495	1.14	+0.42	0	±0
Ruiz-Mateos Group (Ruiz-Mateos)	25,539	0.95	New	0	±0
The Ecologist Greens (LVE)	23,996	0.89	New	0	±0
Workers' Party of Spain–Communist Unity (PTE–UC)^{2}	11,621	0.43	–2.04	0	±0
Workers' Socialist Party (PST)	8,427	0.31	–0.13	0	±0
Spanish Vertex Ecological Development Revindication (VERDE)	4,963	0.18	–0.10	0	±0
Spanish Phalanx of the CNSO (FE–JONS)	3,657	0.14	–0.16	0	±0
Regional Party of Madrid (PAM)	3,396	0.13	New	0	±0
Group of Madrid Radicals (GRM)	3,330	0.12	New	0	±0
Communist Party of the Peoples of Spain (PCPE)	3,002	0.11	New	0	±0
Humanist Party (PH)	1,973	0.07	New	0	±0
Liberal and Social Democratic Coalition (CSD y L)	1,888	0.07	New	0	±0
Revolutionary Workers' Party of Spain (PORE)	1,847	0.07	–0.01	0	±0
Alliance for the Republic (AxR)^{3}	1,632	0.06	±0.00	0	±0
Independent Citizen Group (ACI)	1,359	0.05	New	0	±0
Centrist Unity–Democratic Spanish Party (PED)	1,057	0.04	New	0	±0
Spanish Democratic Republican Action (ARDE)	975	0.04	New	0	±0
Independent Spanish Phalanx (FEI)	827	0.03	New	0	±0
Asturianist Party (PAS)	767	0.03	New	0	±0
Communist Party of Spain (Marxist–Leninist) (PCE (m–l))^{4}	0	0.00	–0.08	0	±0
Blank ballots	27,303	1.02	+0.06		
Total	2,686,715			33	±0
Valid votes	2,686,715	99.47	+1.18		
Invalid votes	14,227	0.53	–1.18		
Votes cast / turnout	2,700,942	72.72	–1.18		
Abstentions	1,012,999	27.28	+1.18		
Registered voters	3,713,941				
Sources
Footnotes: ^{1} People's Party results are compared to People's Coalition totals in the 1986 election.; ^{2} Workers' Party of Spain–Communist Unity results are compared to Communists' Unity Board totals in the 1986 election.; ^{3} Alliance for the Republic results are compared to Internationalist Socialist Workers' Party totals in the 1986 election.; ^{4} Communist Party of Spain (Marxist–Leninist) results are compared to Republican Popular Unity totals in the 1986 election.

=== 1986 ===
Summary of the 22 June 1986 Congress of Deputies election results in Madrid
Parties and alliances	Popular vote			Seats	
Parties and alliances	Votes	%	±pp	Total	+/−
Spanish Socialist Workers' Party (PSOE)	1,054,730	40.81	–11.28	15	–3
People's Coalition (AP–PDP–PL)^{1}	826,206	31.97	–0.29	11	±0
Democratic and Social Centre (CDS)	360,246	13.94	+9.84	5	+4
United Left (IU)^{2}	155,932	6.03	+1.05	2	+1
Communists' Unity Board (MUC)	63.928	2.47	New	0	±0
Democratic Reformist Party (PRD)	36,709	1.42	New	0	±0
The Greens (LV)	18,559	0.72	New	0	±0
Workers' Socialist Party (PST)	11,282	0.44	+0.15	0	±0
Spanish Phalanx of the CNSO (FE–JONS)	7,761	0.30	+0.30	0	±0
Spanish Vertex Ecological Development Revindication (VERDE)	7,261	0.28	New	0	±0
Green Alternative List (LAV)	3,478	0.13	New	0	±0
National Unity Coalition (CUN)	3,080	0.12	New	0	±0
Communist Unification of Spain (UCE)	2,737	0.11	–0.03	0	±0
Republican Popular Unity (UPR)^{3}	2,191	0.08	+0.03	0	±0
Revolutionary Workers' Party of Spain (PORE)	2,044	0.08	New	0	±0
Natural Culture (CN)	1,886	0.07	New	0	±0
Internationalist Socialist Workers' Party (POSI)	1,422	0.06	New	0	±0
Party of the Communists of Catalonia (PCC)	296	0.01	New	0	±0
Union of the Democratic Centre (UCD)	n/a	n/a	–3.35	0	–1
Blank ballots	24,814	0.96	+0.53		
Total	2,584,562			33	+1
Valid votes	2,584,562	98.29	+0.16		
Invalid votes	44,844	1.71	–0.16		
Votes cast / turnout	2,629,406	73.90	–12.06		
Abstentions	928,522	26.10	+12.06		
Registered voters	3,557,928				
Sources
Footnotes: ^{1} People's Coalition results are compared to People's Alliance–People's Democratic Party totals in the 1982 election.; ^{2} United Left results are compared to Communist Party of Spain totals in the 1982 election.; ^{3} Republican Popular Unity results are compared to Communist Party of Spain (Marxist–Leninist) totals in the 1982 election.

=== 1982 ===
Summary of the 28 October 1982 Congress of Deputies election results in Madrid
Parties and alliances	Popular vote			Seats	
Parties and alliances	Votes	%	±pp	Total	+/−
Spanish Socialist Workers' Party (PSOE)	1,439,137	52.09	+18.75	18	+6
People's Alliance–People's Democratic Party (AP–PDP)^{1}	891,372	32.26	+23.66	11	+8
Communist Party of Spain (PCE)	137,459	4.98	–8.48	1	–3
Democratic and Social Centre (CDS)	113,384	4.10	New	1	+1
Union of the Democratic Centre (UCD)	92,508	3.35	–29.79	1	–11
New Force (FN)^{2}	22,602	0.82	–3.98	0	–1
Spanish Solidarity (SE)	10,017	0.36	New	0	±0
Workers' Socialist Party (PST)	8,064	0.29	New	0	±0
Communist Party of Spain (Marxist–Leninist) (PCE (m–l))	7,532	0.27	New	0	±0
Socialist Party (PS)^{3}	6,375	0.23	–0.35	0	±0
Spanish Communist Workers' Party (PCOE)	5,210	0.19	New	0	±0
Communist Unification of Spain (UCE)	3,900	0.14	–0.15	0	±0
Communist Left Front (FIC)	3,772	0.14	New	0	±0
Communist Unity Candidacy (CUC)^{4}	3,188	0.12	–0.08	0	±0
Falangist Movement of Spain (MFE)	2,187	0.08	New	0	±0
Independent Citizen Group (ACI)	1,710	0.06	New	0	±0
Spanish Catholic Movement (MCE)	1,694	0.06	New	0	±0
Communist League–Internationalist Socialist Workers' Coalition (LC (COSI))	634	0.02	–0.10	0	±0
Spanish Phalanx of the CNSO (FE–JONS)	92	0.00	New	0	±0
Blank ballots	11,826	0.43	+0.05		
Total	2,762,663			32	±0
Valid votes	2,762,663	98.13	–0.99		
Invalid votes	52,635	1.87	+0.99		
Votes cast / turnout	2,815,298	85.96	+12.69		
Abstentions	459,668	14.04	–12.69		
Registered voters	3,274,966				
Sources
Footnotes: ^{1} People's Alliance–People's Democratic Party results are compared to Democratic Coalition totals in the 1979 election.; ^{2} New Force results are compared to National Union totals in the 1979 election.; ^{3} Socialist Party results are compared to Spanish Socialist Workers' Party (historical) totals in the 1979 election.; ^{4} Communist Unity Candidacy results are compared to Workers' Communist Party totals in the 1979 election.

=== 1979 ===
Summary of the 1 March 1979 Congress of Deputies election results in Madrid
Parties and alliances	Popular vote			Seats	
Parties and alliances	Votes	%	±pp	Total	+/−
Spanish Socialist Workers' Party (PSOE)^{1}	769,328	33.34	–7.50	12	–2
Union of the Democratic Centre (UCD)	764,830	33.14	+1.19	12	+1
Communist Party of Spain (PCE)	310,496	13.46	+2.76	4	±0
Democratic Coalition (CD)^{2}	198,345	8.60	–1.88	3	±0
National Union (UN)^{3}	110,730	4.80	+4.11	1	+1
Workers' Revolutionary Organization (ORT)^{4}	48,354	2.10	+1.39	0	±0
Party of Labour of Spain (PTE)^{5}	25,832	1.12	+0.54	0	±0
Spanish Socialist Workers' Party (historical) (PSOEh)^{6}	13,322	0.58	–0.65	0	±0
Communist Movement–Organization of Communist Left (MC–OIC)^{7}	9,095	0.39	+0.16	0	±0
Republican Left (IR)	7,950	0.34	New	0	±0
Communist Unification of Spain (UCE)	6,680	0.29	New	0	±0
Spanish Phalanx of the CNSO (Authentic) (FE–JONS(A))	5,264	0.23	–0.09	0	±0
Liberal Party (PL)	4,873	0.21	New	0	±0
Revolutionary Communist League (LCR)^{8}	4,691	0.20	+0.06	0	±0
Workers' Communist Party (PCT)	4,675	0.20	New	0	±0
Syndicalist Party (PSIN)	3,845	0.17	New	0	±0
Basque Country Left (EE)	3,029	0.13	New	0	±0
Communist League (LC)	2,705	0.12	New	0	±0
Union for the Freedom of Speech (ULE)	1,716	0.07	New	0	±0
Carlist Party (PC)	1,683	0.07	New	0	±0
Proverist Party (PPr)	1,510	0.07	New	0	±0
Blank ballots	8,691	0.38	+0.12		
Total	2,307,644			32	±0
Valid votes	2,307,644	99.12	+0.14		
Invalid votes	20,585	0.88	–0.14		
Votes cast / turnout	2,328,229	73.27	–11.73		
Abstentions	849,503	26.73	+11.73		
Registered voters	3,177,732				
Sources
Footnotes: ^{1} Spanish Socialist Workers' Party results are compared to the combined totals of Spanish Socialist Workers' Party and People's Socialist Party–Socialist Unity in the 1977 election.; ^{2} Democratic Coalition results are compared to People's Alliance totals in the 1977 election.; ^{3} National Union results are compared to the combined totals of Spanish Phalanx of the CNSO and José Antonio Circles in the 1977 election.; ^{4} Workers' Revolutionary Organization results are compared to Workers' Electoral Group totals in the 1977 election.; ^{5} Party of Labour of Spain results are compared to Democratic Left Front totals in the 1977 election.; ^{6} Spanish Socialist Workers' Party (historical) results are compared to Democratic Socialist Alliance totals in the 1977 election.; ^{7} Communist Movement–Organization of Communist Left results are compared to Popular Unity Candidates totals in the 1977 election.; ^{8} Revolutionary Communist League results are compared to Front for Workers' Unity totals in the 1977 election.

=== 1977 ===
Summary of the 15 June 1977 Congress of Deputies election results in Madrid
Parties and alliances	Popular vote			Seats	
Parties and alliances	Votes	%	±pp	Total	+/−
Union of the Democratic Centre (UCD)	737,699	31.95	n/a	11	n/a
Spanish Socialist Workers' Party (PSOE)	731,380	31.68	n/a	11	n/a
Communist Party of Spain (PCE)	247,038	10.70	n/a	4	n/a
People's Alliance (AP)	242,077	10.48	n/a	3	n/a
People's Socialist Party–Socialist Unity (PSP–US)	211,440	9.16	n/a	3	n/a
Federation of Christian Democracy (FPD–ID)	34,113	1.48	n/a	0	n/a
Democratic Socialist Alliance (ASDCI)	28,363	1.23	n/a	0	n/a
Workers' Electoral Group (AET)	16,372	0.71	n/a	0	n/a
Spanish Phalanx of the CNSO (FE–JONS)	13,721	0.59	n/a	0	n/a
Democratic Left Front (FDI)	13,328	0.58	n/a	0	n/a
Spanish Phalanx of the CNSO (Authentic) (FE–JONS(A))	7,345	0.32	n/a	0	n/a
Popular Unity Candidates (CUP)	5,206	0.23	n/a	0	n/a
Independent Party of Madrid (PIM)	4,814	0.21	n/a	0	n/a
Spanish Social Reform (RSE)	4,344	0.19	n/a	0	n/a
Front for Workers' Unity (FUT)	3,264	0.14	n/a	0	n/a
José Antonio Circles (CJA)	2,301	0.10	n/a	0	n/a
Blank ballots	6,111	0.26	n/a		
Total	2,308,916			32	n/a
Valid votes	2,308,916	98.98	n/a		
Invalid votes	23,744	1.02	n/a		
Votes cast / turnout	2,332,660	85.00	n/a		
Abstentions	411,492	15.00	n/a		
Registered voters	2,744,152				

== Bibliography ==
- Ley 1/1977, de 4 de enero, para la Reforma Política (Fundamental Law 1/1977). Official State Gazette (in Spanish). 4 January 1977. BOE-A-1977-165.
- Real Decreto-ley 20/1977, de 18 de marzo, sobre Normas Electorales (Royal Decree-Law 20/1977). Official State Gazette (in Spanish). 18 March 1977. BOE-A-1977-7445.
- Constitución Española (Constitution). Official State Gazette (in Spanish). 27 December 1978. BOE-A-1978-31229.
- Ley Orgánica 5/1985, de 19 de junio, del Régimen Electoral General (Organic Law 5/1985). Official State Gazette (in Spanish). 19 June 1985. BOE-A-1985-11672.
- Carreras de Odriozola, Albert; Tafunell Sambola, Xavier (2005) [1989]. Estadísticas históricas de España, siglos XIX-XX (PDF) (in Spanish). Vol. 1 (II ed.). Bilbao: Fundación BBVA. pp. 1072–1097. ISBN 84-96515-00-1. Archived from the original (PDF) on 24 September 2015.
