= FJ =

FJ may refer to:

== Places ==
- Fiji (ISO 3166-1 alpha-2 country code)
  - .fj, the country code top level domain (ccTLD) for Fiji
  - Fijian language (ISO 639-1 language code)
- Fujian, a province of China

== Vehicles ==
- FJ Fury, an early Cold War fighter aircraft of the US Navy
- Flying Junior, a sailing dinghy
- Holden FJ, an Australian car
- Jeep FJ, a compact delivery van
- Toyota FJ Cruiser, a sport utility vehicle
- Yamaha FJ, motorcycle

== Science and mathematics ==
- The FASEB Journal, a scientific journal of experimental biosciences
- Femtojoule (fJ), an SI unit of energy equal to 10^{−15} joules
- Fritz John conditions, conditions in optimization problems

== Media ==
- FictionJunction, a J-pop group
- The FJ Holden, an Australian film

== Military ==
- Fallschirmjäger, German paratroopers
- Fahnenjunker, a military rank of the Bundeswehr
- FJ ABM, an anti-ballistic missile
- Young Force (Fuerza Joven), the former youth wing of the Fuerza Nueva
- Youth Front (Frente de la Juventud), a Spanish terrorist organization

== Aviation ==
- Fiji Airways (IATA code)
- Williams FJ33 and FJ44, families of turbofan jet engines

== Other uses ==
- FJ Management, an American corporation
- FJ Reitz High School, a public high school in Evansville, Indiana
- Formula Junior, an auto racing class
- Sony Vaio FJ, a mid-2000s series of laptops
- Fulbright & Jaworski, former United States law firm

== See also ==
- FJD (disambiguation)
- FJS (disambiguation)
