= Búnker =

Hard-line fascist group

The búnker was the faction that manifested itself in Spain during the end of the Franco regime and the Spanish transition to democracy. It was maintained by figures of the regime who were radically opposed to introducing any changes to it, and who after Franco's death absolutely rejected reforms, instead defending the continuity of the Movimiento Nacional. Its three main representatives were the neo-Francoists José Antonio Girón de Velasco, Raimundo Fernández-Cuesta, and Blas Piñar. The most important newspaper of the búnker was El Alcázar, which refers to the Siege of the Alcázar, where nationalist forces held the Alcázar of Toledo against an overwhelmingly larger Spanish Republican Army during the Spanish Civil War. The term refers to the extreme resistance that Hitler maintained until his last moments in the Führerbunker. According to the historian José Luis Rodríguez Jiménez,

[T]he concept of "bunker" refers to a group of influential people in entrenched positions and established in the institutions of the Francoist State. That is to say, it is a political, economic and ecclesiastical conglomerate, sometimes not very well synchronized. Its most solid pillars were in the National Council [of the Movement], the Cortes [Españoles], the Council of the Realm and the Syndical Organization, as well as in the press and in the army officer corps. Therefore, the term "bunker" refers, much more than to an ideology or a certain program, to a way of defending political and economic interests, as well as a mentality linked to the scheme of values imposed by the victors in the civil war.

== Members ==
At the head of the movement was the former Minister of Labour, the Falangist Girón de Velasco, as well as members of the army (Carlos Iniesta Cano, Milans del Bosch, Fernando de Santiago, Alfonso Pérez-Viñeta), the Church (the Spanish Priestly Brotherhood and names such as Fernando Quiroga Palacios and José Guerra Campos), and in politics, embodied by FET y de las JONS (José Luis Arrese, Fernández-Cuesta, Tomás García Rebull, Juan García Carrés, Luis Valero Bermejo, etc.) and by the New Force party, led by Piñar.

== History ==
=== Origin ===
The term was used for the first time in 1968 in an article published in the newspaper ABC by its director, Torcuato Luca de Tena, to refer to those who opposed the evolution of the Franco regime and opening up to Europe. However, the word búnker referring to the group of right-wing extremists was popularized by Santiago Carrillo, who used it in an article entitled "O la libertad o el búnker", implying that the refusal to start down a democratic path would mean for the defenders of the dictatorship an end analogous to that of Hitler in the Führerbunker, which ultimately ended up being his tomb. The búnker began form in 1974, the year before the death of Francisco Franco, although some authors trace its genesis to 1970, coinciding with the first signs of exhaustion of the regime and the voices that clamored for its reform. They identify the movement with Luis Carrero Blanco, who was Prime Minister for several months in 1973.

=== Actions ===
As an immobilist current of thought, the members of the búnker systematically opposed, through different means, all of the steps that were taken in the Spanish transition from dictatorship to democracy, beginning with their radical opposition to the so-called Spirit of February 12 and its eventual corollary, the Law of Political Associations. This opposition was expressed through opinion articles in related media, the most prominent being the one signed by Girón de Velasco in the newspaper Arriba on April 28, 1974, popularly known as the Gironazo, thus putting an end to any attempt at reform and precipitating the dismissal of the pro-reform Minister of Information and Tourism Pío Cabanillas.

On the same day that the gironazo appeared in the pages of Arriba, Nuevo Diario published an interview with Lieutenant General Tomás García Rebull, another prominent member of the búnker, in which he said that "as a Falangist I do not accept associations of any kind" because "[they] inevitably deviate into political parties and the parties, for me, are the opium of the masses, and the politicians their vampires". He also claimed that Freemasonry had been behind the assassination of Carrero Blanco. When asked what his claim was based on, he replied: "Well... on the things I see. Many times I ask myself: but hey, where does this come from? And I always say: nothing, Freemasonry. I think we have even exported Freemasons".

Before Franco's death, there was still pressure for the Crown to fall not on the designated heir Juan Carlos, but on his cousin, Alfonso, Duke of Anjou and Cádiz, at the time married to the dictator's granddaughter, María del Carmen Martínez-Bordiú. Therefore, the operation had the support of Alfonso's father-in-law, Cristóbal Martínez-Bordiú, and his grandmother-in-law, Carmen Polo. After the death of the dictator, the búnker tried to prevent each of the changes that were taking place on the path of democratization. The búnker's connections with the successive attempts to put an end to the democratic system that was beginning to take shape in Spain in the 1970s have been pointed out, identifying the events of 1978, 1979, 1980 and the 1981 Spanish coup d'état attempt.

== See also ==
- Cafetería Rolando bombing
- Political Reform Act
