= Plaza de San Justo, Toledo =

Coordinates: 39.8563°N 4.0217°W

The Plaza de San Justo is a square located in the city of Toledo, in Castile-La Mancha, Spain. In the upper part of the city, halfway between the Alcázar and the Cathedral there is a square named after the Church of San Justo y Pastor. Of the same church and in that same square it says the legend of "The Christ of the Cutlery". There a sign where it read the legend where events are supposed to happen, or not.

Also this small square houses other buildings of interest, such as the Palacio de Amusco and the Former Solís Sanatorium.
