= El Alcázar =

Spanish daily newspaper (1936-1988)

- Type: Daily newspaper
- Founded: 1936
- Ceased publication: 1988
- Political alignment: Far-right
- Language: Spanish

El Alcázar (meaning The Fortress in English) was a Spanish language newspaper published in Spain between 1936 and 1988.

== History and profile ==
El Alcázar was established in 1936. The paper was founded as a two-sided newsletter during the Siege of the Alcázar by the defenders of the Alcázar of Toledo. After the siege was lifted it became a regular newspaper within the Nationalist zone that mainly focused on military news.

During a short period that spanned from 1966 to 1968, the paper opened itself to the more moderate tendencies of Francoist Spain. However, its direction changed in 1968 and El Alcázar renewed with its support of Falangist ideology, especially after it was converted into the official newspaper of the Confederación Nacional de Ex Combatientes, an organization grouping militants defending the essence of Francoist Spain who fought in the Spanish Civil war, in June 1975.

Following Francisco Franco's death in November 1975 and the beginning of the transition to democracy, the newspaper became the mouthpiece of the Búnker, a group of Francoist and ultramontanist soldiers and leaders opposed to democracy. Between 1977 and 1981, they published various articles from the Colectivo Almendros which publicly declared itself in favor of a coup d'état, one a short time before the 23-F attempted putsch. Following the self-dissolution of Blas Piñar's Fuerza Nueva, a Francoist far-right party, the newspaper published in 1983 a call for the creation of a new far-right party, materialized by the foundation of the Juntas Españolas.

The circulation of El Alcázar declined between 1970 and 1975. Its circulation was 13,119 copies in 1975, 26,724 copies in 1976, 63,646 copies in 1977 and 66,104 in 1978. The increase in its circulation continued until 1980.

El Alcázar closed in 1988 as a result of poor sales. Antonio Izquierdo served as the paper's last editor. By the end of the paper's run, circulation was primarily among Francoist veterans.

In November 1994 the Audiencia Nacional sentenced the Spanish State to pay 3 billion pesetas (€18 million) to the owners of the defunct newspaper for discriminating it from official advertising, public subscription and subsidies by socialist governments. The money was used to pay the debts that Dyrsa, company holding the header had with the Social Security, public finances and ex-workers.

== Notable people ==
- Jorge Claramunt
- Jesús Evaristo Casariego
- Jesús Ercilla
- José Luis Cebrián
- Fernando Vizcaíno Casas
- Enrique Jardiel Poncela
- Rafael García Serrano
- José Antonio Gurriarán
- Alfonso Paso
- Yale

== See also ==
- Juntas Españolas
