= Military Democratic Union =

Unión Militar Democrática (the Democratic Military Union) was a clandestine Spanish organisation of military officers in the late- and post-Francoist Spain era.

== History ==
In the final years of the rule of Francisco Franco, there was uncertainty as to the path the country would follow after the caudillo's demise. Many members of the officer corps willingly accepted the prospect of a transition to a new constitutional order, but others, mainly in the army, who still identified with Franco's ideological notions, regarded democratisation as a betrayal of the nationalist victory in the civil war that ended in 1939.

In 1972, a small, secret society of younger army officers was formed around a platform of common objectives: Unifying the three armed-forces ministries; restricting the scope of the military justice system; reducing the length of military service for the population which was, at the time, obligatory; the imposition of restrictions on the military intelligence system; restricting the authority of the captains general of the nine military regions of the country; etc. The group grew relatively quickly, its members numbering between two and three hundred military officers by 1974.

Events in Portugal, where, on 25 April 1974, the military forces, organized in the Armed Forces Movement, staged a coup that effectively returned democracy to the country, boosted participation in the secret organisation of Spanish military officers, which then took inspiration in this movement and adopted the name Unión Militar Democrática (Democratic Military Union).

== Reaction of the regime ==
The existence of the organisation quickly became known to the SECED, the intelligence service of the Spanish state, and nine of its members were arrested in Madrid in July 1975, put on trial and condemned in 1976 to prison sentences of up to eight years. One of the arrested was founding member Major Luis Otero who got the heaviest sentence but was pardoned under the 1977 Amnesty Law.

Notably, one of the arrested members of UMD had been born inside the citadel of Alcázar during its protracted siege by Republican forces, in the Spanish Civil War.

In a 2010 interview to Spanish newspaper El País, one of the founding members said that he and his fellow officers had contacted "as many people as possible" within the military in order to spread their ideas, concluding "We obviously talked to the wrong people because the intelligence services found out about us immediately."

== Dissolution ==
The organisation declared itself dissolved in June 1977, on the occasion of the first free, democratic elections to be held in Spain since 1935.

== Legacy ==
Most of the reforms outlined in the political platform of UDM were eventually, though gradually, adopted after Franco's death by the democratic governments.

In 2008, Spanish judge Baltasar Garzón opened a far-reaching investigation into the disappearances of Republicans in Spain during the Franco era, also ordering the opening of alleged mass graves, including one believed to contain the remains of the poet Federico García Lorca. The investigation caused political turmoil, with people opposed to it claiming that the 1977 amnesty covered all the crimes committed by either side during the Civil War. One of the founding members of UDM, retired colonel Julián Delgado, who, after the transition to democracy, was appointed head of the Guardia Urbana (the city police force) in Barcelona, publicly objected to the investigation, because it would be "absurd to stir up pain." Delgado warned that support for the victims of the Civil War and their families should be done "without the desire for revenge" since this "does no good to democracy."

In 2010, Defence Minister Carme Chacón, representing the Spanish government, awarded the Military Merit Cross to 14 members of UMD, three of them posthumously.

== Bibliography ==
- Fernández López, Javier. Militares contra Franco : historia de la Unión Militar Democrática, Mira Editores June 2002, ISBN 978-84-8465-107-9 (in Spanish)
