= Juntas Españolas =

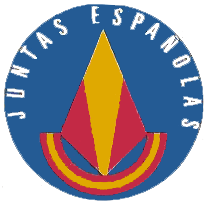
- Leader: Esteban Gómez Rovira; Ramón Graells; Blas Piñar; Antonio Izquierdo
- Founder: Blas Piñar
- Founded: 1983
- Dissolved: 1994
- Succeeded by: National Democracy
- Headquarters: Madrid
- Newspaper: El Alcázar
- Youth wing: Patria y Libertad
- Ideology: Neo-fascism; National syndicalism Spanish nationalism Third Position
- Political position: Far-right
- Colors: Red and yellow

Juntas Españolas was a far-right political party in Spain that was created in 1983 after a call had been issued in the now-defunct newspaper El Alcázar by the newspaper's director, Antonio Izquierdo. The group also followed the failure and self-dissolution of the Fuerza Nueva of Blas Piñar.

The group intended to renew and modernize the message of the far right in Spain by abandoning some of the most reactionary positions (for example, accepting divorce). The group dissolved and integrated with the Alianza Democrática Nacional, which later became Democracia Nacional (DN).
