= Spanish Catholic Movement =

Spanish Catholic Movement Movimiento Católico Español
- Abbreviation: MCE, MCE-AJE
- Leader: José Luis Corral
- Founded: 1982
- Split from: New Force
- Headquarters: C/ Gral. Lacy, 12; 28042, Madrid
- Youth wing: Spanish Youth Action
- Ideology: Integralism; National syndicalism Spanish nationalism Francoism; Traditionalism; Conservatism; Factions: Republicanism
- Political position: Far-right
- Religion: Catholicism
- National affiliation: La España en Marcha
- Colours: Green
- Slogan: Fe y Patria

Website
- www.movimientocatolico.es www.mce-aje.es

The Spanish Catholic Movement (Spanish: Movimiento Católico Español, MCE) is a minor integralist and nationalist political party in Spain. The party has been led by José Luis Corral, a former member of New Force (FN), since its foundation.

It was founded in 1982 as a splinter party of New Force, then led by Blas Piñar. The party was born out of dissatisfied factions of the former, after Corral, alongside other members, left the party due to internal issues and discussions with the leadership. The MCE gained notoriety in the 1980s, during the years following the Spanish transition to democracy. Most of its members were militant and were known for their street activity. During its political history, the organization has joined multiple coalitions, such as Coalición de Unidad Nacional in 1986, the Alianza por la Unidad Nacional in 1996, and La España en Marcha in 2014, where it currently remains.

The MCE has as fundamental principles Catholic confesionalism, the defense of Spain and the Spanish tradition, and national syndicalism. At the same time, it opposes liberalism, communism, and parliamentarism, as well as abortion, same-sex marriage, feminism, and racism. The organization upholds the legacy of both José Antonio Primo de Rivera and Francisco Franco, and has participated in the manifestations of 20-N, the anniversary of their deaths. Although supportive of monarchism, the MCE opposes the House of Bourbon.

== History ==
MCE was founded in 1982 as a splinter group from Fuerza Nueva, led by José Luis Corral. In the Spanish general elections of 1982, the party received 996 votes, less than 1% of the total. In the following years, the MCE organized masses, tributes to the Blue Division veterans and to the "fallen for Spain", as well as numerous rallies against abortion. The party has its ideological roots in Acción Española and Renovación Española, integralist, and traditionalist organizations during the Spanish Civil War. In the last 10 years, the party has also organized acts against homosexuals or Catalan separatism.

- García Lupato, Fabio; Ruiz Rodríguez, Leticia; Sánchez Medero, Gema (2020). "La derecha española dividida: posiciones ideológicas y clivaje territorial". Politica y Sociedad. 57 (3): 719–745. doi:10.5209/poso.69207.
- Samdahl Weltz, Hedda (2014). The Extreme Right in Spain: Surviving in the Shadow of Franco (1975-2014) (PDF) (Thesis). Oslo, Norway: University of Oslo.
