= FJS =

FJS may refer to:

- Fallskärmsjägarskolan (FJS), the Swedish Parachute Ranger School
- French Japanese Society for fine and medicinal chemistry
- Fajar Secondary School (FJS), in Bukit Panjang, Singapore
- FJ-S Cruiser Concept, a concept version of the Toyota FJ Cruiser
- FJS-1, a type of lunar regolith simulant
- FJS, airline code for Florida Jet Service
- Federación Juvenil Socialista (FJS), Chilean socialist party joined by revolutionary Miguel Enríquez
- Federación de Juventudes Socialistas (FJS), one of the original parties consolidated into the Communist Party of Spain
- Franz Josef Strauss, West German politician (1915-1988)

== See also ==
- FJ (disambiguation)
