= Confidentiel =

Transnational political magazine (1979–1981)

- Categories: Transnational political magazine
- Founder: Stefano Delle Chiaie
- Founded: 1979
- Final issue: 1981
- Country: France; Italy; Spain; Argentina
- Based in: Paris; Rome; Barcelona; Buenos Aires

Confidentiel was a far-right magazine which existed between 1979 and 1981. Although it was based in Paris, France, it was also published in different countries: Spain, Italy and Argentina. The magazine is known for its founder, Italian far-right activist Stefano Delle Chiaie.

== History and profile ==
Confidentiel was launched by Stefano Delle Chiaie in Paris in 1979 to revitalize the neo-fascist movement. The others involved in the establishment of the magazine were former members of the Italian far-right group Ordine Nuovo. The magazine had offices in Barcelona, Rome and Buenos Aires. It was started in Argentina in 1980. The editorial board of the magazine included Gérald Penciolelli, Jean-Marc Brissaud, Paulo de Castro, Enrique Sixto de Borbón-Parma and Catherine Barnay. Of them Gérald Penciolelli and Catherine Barnay coedited Confidentiel. Ernesto Milá, a Spanish far-right militant, was among its contributors. Adriano Tilgher was the director of the Italian edition.

Confidentiel folded in France in 1981 after producing eight issues. The final issue of its Italian edition appeared in Spring 1982.
