= España 2000 =

Spain 2000 España 2000
- President: José Luis Roberto
- Vice President: Antonio Martínez Cayuela
- Founded: 2002
- Headquarters: Dos Aguas, Valencia
- Ideology: Spanish nationalism Right-wing populism Euroscepticism; Social patriotism Anti-globalism; Protectionism; Blaverism; Anti-LGBTQ sentiment
- Political position: Far-right
- National affiliation: RESPETO
- Colours: Red and Yellow
- Mayors: 1 / 8,131
- Local Government: 6 / 67,121

Website
- espana2000.es

Spain 2000 (Spanish: España 2000; E-2000) is a far-right political party in Spain. Founded in 2002, the party has been described as neo-Nazi and is currently led by José Luis Roberto. It has never obtained national or regional parliamentary representation.

Since 2010, E-2000 has awaken interest among media. The party was mentioned by terrorist Anders Breivik in his pamphlet "2083. A declaration of European independence" back in 2011. The last time the party ran in a general election was in 2011, where it obtained 9266 votes.

Following the fourth Party Congress, its president José Luis Roberto left the presidency and was replaced by Rafael Ripoll. In October 2020, Ripoll resigned and was succeeded by Roberto, who was chosen party leader once again.

== History ==
=== Origin ===
E-2000 has its origins in the Platform Spain 2000 (Spanish: Plataforma España 2000), created for the 2000 Spanish general election by the far-right political parties Democracia Nacional (DN), Movimiento Social Republicano (MSR), Partido Nacional de los Trabajadores (PNT) and Vértice Social Español (VSE). The project received the support of Jean-Marie Le Pen, then president of the French National Front. The platform was dissolved following the election due to infighting.

España 2000 was founded as a political party in July 2002 by a group of independents who had been former members of the previous platform. José Luis Roberto was chosen as the party leader.

=== Roberto's first leadership (2002–2015) ===
The party contested elections with minimal success. In the 2008 general election, for example, the party polled 7,543 votes, or 0.03% of the total. However, in 2007 they gained their first elected representative when they won a council seat in Silla, a town south of Valencia city.

In the 2011 municipal elections, España 2000 won five council seats. A councillor in Onda with 649 votes (5.05%), one in Dos Aguas with 66 votes (12.43%), two in Silla (Valencia) with 997 votes (9.56%) and one in Alcalá de Henares with 4,541 votes (5.18%).

In 2011, the terrorist Anders Breivik, author of the same year's Norway Attacks, mentioned E-2000 in the page 1246 of his pamphlet "2083. A declaration of European independence". There, he called the Spanish party "a storm that has shaken Valencia by surprise, winning councillors in three different municipalities".

The party kept their single city councillor in Alcalá de Henares after the 2015 municipal election, while making advances in other municipalities of the Henares industrial corridor, namely three in Los Santos de la Humosa, one in Velilla de San Antonio and another in San Fernando de Henares. E-2000 also obtained one councillor in Silla, which was one less than they had in 2011.

Following the fourth party Congress the 10 October 2015, party leader José Luis Roberto resigned from the party presidency.

=== Ripoll's leadership (2015–2020) ===
Rafael Ripoll, councillor of Alcalá de Henares from 2011 to 2019 for the party, was unanimously chosen the new party leader during the fourth party Congress on 10 October 2015. During his leadership, E-2000 developed good relationships with similar political parties in other European countries such as the Liberal Democratic Party of Russia led by Vladimir Zhirinovsky, mainly due to his time serving as the manager of foreign relations of the political party Democracia Nacional.

E-2000 created the platform Respect (Spanish: Plataforma Respeto) in 2016, together with the now defunct political parties Platform for Catalonia and Party for Freedom. The platform was led by Ripoll, inspired by Marine Le Pen's National Front, and supported by Pegida president Tatjana Festerling. It called for "a Spanish future without corruption, with social justice, stopping Islamisation, with economic sovereignty and defending the family". It had no success.

In 2019, E-2000 decided to not take part in the national and regional elections, in order to avoid dividing the vote and to not damage the electoral expectations of Vox.

Ripoll resigned as party leader on October 2020.

=== Roberto's second term (2020–present) ===
José Luis Roberto was chosen the party president once again during the fifth party Congress.

== Ideology ==
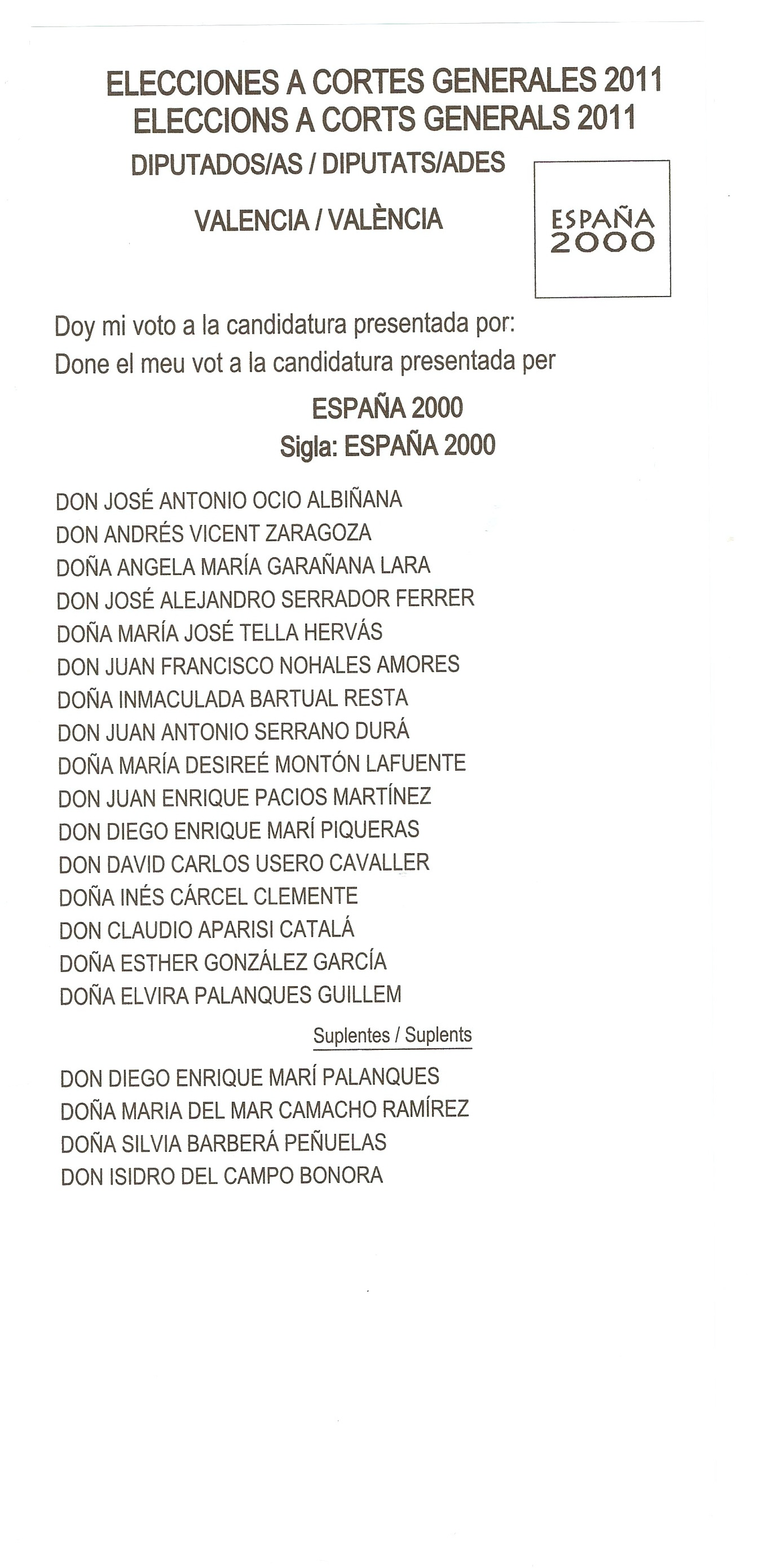
Party list for the 2011 Spanish general election.

España 2000 defines itself as populist, social and democratic. The party has been described as far-right and identified with neo-Nazism. Its discourse is characterized by a Spanish nationalism which is tied to Blaverism in the Valencian community. The party advocates a «National Republic» as opposed to both socialist republicanism and nationalist monarchists, criticising the appropriation of republicanism by the left-wing.

E-2000 advocates a mixture of social patriotism and social conservatism, centering on the defense of the traditional family values set forth by the Traditionalist Catholic Church. The party opposes economic and real estate speculation.

Key features of the party's platform include the establishment of a more democratic voting system by abolishing the D'Hondt method; tighter control of Spanish borders to prevent illegal immigration, and the immediate expulsion of illegal immigrants; giving native Spaniards priority access to jobs; more investment in the police and military; more social spending, particularly in public education and protected housing; better salaries and labor conditions for the working class; and a public banking system.

Two quotes by party leader José Luis Roberto, indicative of his and the party's ideology, are the following:

- ¿Tu admitirías que tu mujer diese a luz si la hubiese violado un moro? Yo no. (...) Por eso España 2000 esta a favor de que se legisle el aborto en casos extraordinarios al igual que la Eutanasia. ("Would you consent to your wife having her baby had she been raped by a Moor? I wouldn't. (...) That's why España 2000 is pro-choice under extraordinary circumstances, as it is in favour of euthanasia").
- La religión del Islam es un cáncer para la sociedad europea. ("Islam is a cancer to European society").

== Organization ==
=== Leadership ===
Party leader		Time in office
1.	José Luis Roberto	2002–2015
2.	Rafael Ripoll	2015–2020
3.	José Luis Roberto	2020–present

Its leader is José Luis Roberto, lawyer and general secretary of the Asociación Nacional de Empresarios de Locales de Alterne.

Roberto, who is also a self-described "entrepreneur", owns the security firm Levantina de Seguridad (the "de facto" security syndicate in Valencia) and the law firm Roberto & Salazar, having representation in Madrid, Barcelona, and Valencia with at least 30 lawyers in office. He also owns several gyms in Valencia, Andalusia and Catalonia, among them Valencian Gym Levantina, which was investigated for some time in relation to illegal valetudo "championships", and military surplus stores held responsible for furnishing a large part of the Madrid local police uniforms. One of Roberto's gyms, Chute Boxe, held valetudo courses for the police, funded with public money and organized by the Sindicato Independiente de Policía. José Luis Roberto was arrested, although never formally indicted, during the Spanish Transition, in connection to two terrorist actions against independentist meetings held in Valencia. He has been consistently accused, albeit without proofs, of founding and partially funding marginal far-right groups such as Acción Radical Frente Antisistema. Permanently based in Valencia, he has published articles in local newspapers such as Las Provincias, Diario de Valencia and Levante, among them the infamous Yo también tengo libros nazis ("I also own Nazi books"). He has been constantly sued and criticized by anti-racist and anti-fascist organizations for engaging in hate speech and allowing open signs of bigotry from members and supporters in his party's meetings.

=== Prominent members ===
Ernesto Milá was recently appointed as the party's press secretary, and appeared in the election list for the 2008 General Election, ostensibly an attempt to gain preponderance over other neo-fascist groups in Spain by capitalizing on Milá's extensive history. Known for his past membership in the Partido Español Nacional Socialista (PENS), Fuerza Nueva and, later on, its splinter group, the Frente de Juventudes, Milá was one of the members of the fringe right-wing extremist groups (usually named incontrolados, "uncontrolled elements") who rallied against leftist or pro-democratic meetings during late Francoism, usually assuming the role of unofficial mob breakers and violent counter-rioters. Although the PENS terrorist attacks on Catalan libraries (such as the Cinc d'Oros, 1971) and libraries and public centers in València (1975), among others, were usually not prosecuted, a thwarted attempt on the Union of the Democratic Centre headquarters, however, resulted in a formal indictment and forced Milá to flee for France. After a stay in Bolivia, where he worked as an adviser for the short-lived Luis García Meza Tejada dictatorship along with infamous neo-fascists such as Stefano delle Chiaie and war criminal Klaus Barbie, he returned to Spain. Widely considered the most intellectually ambitious and well-connected of all Spanish neo-fascists who have escaped successful legal prosecution, Milá is nowadays devoted to "cultural" dissertations about diverse topics held dear by the far right in his blog.

== Public profile ==
The group organized demonstrations in districts of Valencia such as Ruzafa or Velluters, places with a considerable immigrant population. As said above, José Luis Roberto was accused by SOS Racismo and others of racism and hate speech, although the judge ruled out said accusations under the justification that the slurs and racist expressions uttered during the gatherings were "mere generic disqualifications".

He has also organized soccer matches under the slogan Los españoles primero ("Spaniards first"), alleging that Latino bands were "de facto" owners of the soccer courts and held a veto over the admission of other players: not only that was never confirmed but also it appears that the districts where said games were played have a reputation for being prone to rather low levels of conflict. They also run a homeless shelter and a cafeteria.

Every 12 October, the group's supporters gather to demonstrate in Valencia, starting in front of the statue of El Cid and finishing in front of the statue of James I the Conqueror. Slogans uttered by demonstrators at these meetings include "Moros no, España no es un zoo" (No to Moors, Spain is not a zoo) and "España es una y no cincuenta y una" (Spain is one, and not fifty one). During the 2007 march, attendance exceeded 1,000 people (2,000 according to police sources). At the 2007 event, protestors burned pictures of the chairman of Esquerra Republicana de Catalunya, Josep-Lluís Carod-Rovira, and of the Basque lehendakari, Juan José Ibarretxe, chanted En España los españoles primero: contra la inmigración ilegal y en defensa de nuestros derechos (In Spain the Spaniards come first: against illegal immigration and in defence of our rights), and displayed ETA emblems such as Menos pateras, que cierren las fronteras.

== Election results ==
=== Cortes Generales ===
Election	Leader	Congress of Deputies					Senate		Rank	Government
Election	Leader	Votes	%	±pp	Seats	+/−	Seats	+/−	Rank	Government
2004	José Luis Roberto	4,231	0.02%	▲	0 / 350	±0	—N/a	—N/a	#43	No seats
2008	José Luis Roberto	6,906	0.03%	▲0.01	0 / 350	▲0	—N/a	—N/a	#38	No seats
2011	José Luis Roberto	9,266	0.04%	▲0.01	0 / 350	▲0	—N/a	—N/a	#25	No seats

== See also ==
- National Democracy (Spain)
