= Young Force =

Youth wing of Fuerza Nueva

Young Force Spanish: Fuerza Joven
- Founded: 1976
- Ideology: Spanish nationalism National-Catholicism
- Mother party: Fuerza Nueva

Young Force (in Spanish: Fuerza Joven - FJ) was the youth wing of Fuerza Nueva (New Force), the Spanish far-right nationalist party founded in 1966.

Although the organization was short-lived, it had amongst its ranks several individuals who later figured as leaders of other Spanish far-right organizations, like José Luis Corral, leader of the Movimiento Católico Español (Spanish Catholic Movement) and Ricardo Sáenz de Ynestrillas, founder of the Alianza por la Unidad Nacional (Alliance for National Unity).

FJ was involved in several acts of violence against its opponents, for example the massacre of trade unionists at Atocha in 1977, the murder of Arturo Ruiz García, and attacks on university faculties in Madrid and Barcelona. In 1977 Youth Front (FJ) split from Fuerza Joven.
