= Asociación Catalana de Locales de Alterne =

Business association based in Spain

The Asociación Catalana de Locales de Alterne (ACLA; English: Catalan Association of Alternate Premises) is an association of businessmen in the prostitution sector in Catalonia, Spain. The association was created in 2002 and represents 40 clubs out of the 450 in Catalonia.

Its main activities focus on lobbying legislators to create a regulatory framework to regulate activities within the prostitution sector and to modify Barcelona's restrictive legislation on sex clubs. They criticise the lack of action on what they consider to be the main problem of non-regulation: street prostitution.

In 2006 they criticised the draft law of the Generalitat de Catalunya that proposed a minimum age for prostitution of 21 years. They claimed that if as a result of this the premises were closed, street and flat prostitution would increase.

An inspection carried out in 2008 in Barcelona found that many prostitution premises did not comply with the soon to be introduced regulations, primarily that they should not be adjacent to an occupied house or within 200 metres of a school or church. The ACLA reacted by demanding a change in the regulations because closure of the clubs would lead to more prostitution on the streets.

In 2009 the city council of Ciutat Vella claimed that street prostitution would not be reduced by the opening of sex premises, which the ACLA denied.

== See also ==
- Asociación Nacional de Empresarios de Locales de Alterne
- Prostitution in Spain
