= Youth Front =

Neofrancoist militant group

- Frente de la Juventud (in Spanish)
- Leaders: José de las Heras Hurtado; Ernesto Milà; Juan Ignacio González
- Dates active: 1978–1982
- Split from: Young Force
- Active regions: Spain
- Ideology: Neofascism; Anticommunism; Spanish ultranationalism; Francoism
- Political position: Far-right
- Status: Inactive
- Size: 100-300 (1978)

Youth Front (Spanish: Frente de la Juventud; FJ) was a Spanish political youth organization and far-right militant group, sometimes considered a terrorist organization.

== History ==
FJ emerged as a 1978 split of New Force, the main neofrancoist party in Spain at the time. The split with the mainstream far-right happened for similar reasons with the previous split of the National Youth Front (FNJ) in 1977. The split happened due to the stagnation of the main far-right political forces and the frustration of new members of the security section - the sections C and Z - of Fuerza Joven (youth-wing of FN). FJ was founded by José de las Heras and Juan Ignacio González, and later joined by between 100 and 300 members during that year. FJ was opposed to the "parliamentary way" of Fuerza Nueva and FE-JONS, defending also the lack of utility of peaceful demonstrations, supporting the creation of paramilitary units to fight against "marxism".

The Youth Front was based mainly in Madrid and Valladolid (while the FNJ was based in Barcelona). FJ supported violence as a destabilizing element of system, and as its main political strategy.

One of the first actions of the group was taking part in the neofascist assault against the Law Faculty of the Complutense University of Madrid in 1979, along with members of Fuerza Joven and FE-JONS. There were at least 30 far-right militants involved in the assault, that resulted in 3 people from the Law Faculty with gunshot wounds. On 29 April 1979, the group stabbed Andrés García, an 18 year old communist, at Goya Street. Andrés died due to the injuries. On 14 July, FJ placed a Goma-2 explosive at the bar "El Parnasillo" (Malasaña), for allegedly being a place were anarchists and drug addicts congregated. One person died and 9 were injured.

In 1980, the group gained new members after the self-dissolution of the National Youth Front. The most prominent of the new members was Ernesto Milà. At the end of the same year, Juan Ignacio González, the "national secretary" of the organization, was murdered. The murder was never solved, although there is some speculation that it was caused due to an internal feud between rival factions of the organization. His death caused a crisis in the organization.

Twenty-four members were arrested in the cities of Madrid and València on 26 January 1981, for various robberies carried out to fund the organization. Also in 1981, 16 members were arrested for various attacks in Valladolid, against the headquarters of the CNT, PSOE, Cervantes Cinema and the City Hall. FJ also killed Carlos Javier Idígoras Navarrete and Luis Arribas Santamaría (a beggar). Later, in the same year, FJ also bombed the headquarters of the Communist Movement and various book shops.

The group was finally dismantled by the Spanish police in 1982, after a demonstration commemorating the 23-F coup attempt. During the demonstration members of FJ threw molotov cocktails against the police.

The historic leader of the group, José de las Heras Hurtado, was in search and seizure since 1984, after failing to appear in the El Parnasillo bombing trial. Newspaper El País found him in Brazil in 2016.

== See also ==
- Far-right terrorism in Spain
- Batallón Vasco Español
- Fuerza Nueva
- 23-F
