= Asociación Nacional de Empresarios de Locales de Alterne =

Spanish prostitution industry organization

- Industry: Prostitution
- Founded: 2000
- Headquarters: Valencia, Spain
- Area served: Spain
- Key people: José Luis Navarro Roberto; José Roca; Manuel Salazar Aguado; Ernesto Milá

The Asociación Nacional de Empresarios de Locales de Alterne (ANELA; National Association of Brothel's Businessmen) is an association of businessmen involved in prostitution venues. It is located in Valencia and is aligned with the far-right, specifically España 2000. It is the main organisation related to prostitution and an important pressure group in its field.

The official business model for the member clubs is to allow prostitutes to work independently of the venue, paying only for the rent of rooms and drinks. However, in a ruling from the High Court of Justice of Andalusia, the "Mossos d'Esquadra and the testimonies of many sex workers" show this is not the case.

== Aims ==
The association works to give a positive image of the business involved in prostitution. It defends the legalisation of prostitution claiming that it would bring economic security to prostitutes, through a legal framework that regulates the sector. It also "defends the exclusion of minors and drugs in their businesses [and] base the activities on the free will of the prostitute, the client and the entrepreneur of the clubs". They also criticise street prostitution using hygiene arguments. Some, but not all, of these points align with sexual workers's objectives.

The requirements to become a member are:

- To be a businessman from a recognised company.
- Not being involved in illegal drugs.
- Not to allow the involvement of minors.

The association has been criticised in that its criticism of street prostitution favours the association's mode of business: prostitution in its premises is the only type of prostitution that provides them with income. The apparent defence of sex workers is only motivated by their business interests, according to E. Villa Camarma.

While the beliefs and aims of the association have been publicised the media, it has almost always been contrasted with data from other sources.

== History ==
The association was founded in 2000, at a time when there was a certain tolerance of prostitution in Spain after prostitution was decriminalised, and its constitution formalised the following year. Among its founders was José Luis Navarro Roberto and Alejandro Jordan Sánchez Minguillán.

In 2001, ANELA denounced a case of trafficking in people in which a Romanian and a Lithuanian were the victims. The following year, the association applied to join the CEOE.

In 2003, ANELA offered the councils of Valencia and Madrid funding for a pilot scheme to make hotels available to street prostitutes during a trial period. In January 2004 they criticised the reform in article 188.1 of the Criminal Code, which made exploiting the prostitution of another person an offence. This followed a ruling from the Higher Court of Andalusia requiring club owners to register prostitutes for Social security.

In 2006 about four hundred clubs were members of the association.

Judicial operation Operació Il·lusionista (Operation Illusionist) uncovered an exploitation network in Coslada, Madrid in 2008. ANELA alleged that it did not know that such practices existed. Two business associates (owners of the Riviera and Saratoga clubs) ended up in jail for being involved, as did two police officers. That same year ANELA criticised a campaign to persuade men to abstain from using the services of prostitution, which was organised by the city council of Seville.

In 2009 they criticised the Plan Integral de Lucha contra la Trata de Seres Humanos con fines de explotación sexual (Comprehensive Plan to Combat Human Trafficking for Sexual Purposes) and pointed out the ambiguity of two High Courts of Justice rulings: one in Galicia established that prostitution is a person's own economic activity while the other from Catalonia considers that he is someone else's.

The former secretary, José Luis Roberto, resigned in 2011 because his extreme right wing activities could give a bad image to the businesses associated with ANELA. That same year ANELA criticised the Generalitat Valenciana for removing the association's advertising from buses, claiming discrimination.

In 2015 it was found that some clubs had underage employees. The association explained that they were tricked by the presentation of falsified documentation. In the same year, the association complained about the lack of a regulatory framework that is only present in an exemplary way in Catalonia.

== See also ==
- Asociación Catalana de Locales de Alterne
- Prostitution in Spain

== Bibliography ==
- Arella, Celeste; Fernández Bessa, Cristina; Lazo, Gemma Nicolás; Vartabedian, Julieta (2006). "Una aproximación a la vulneración de los derechos humanos de las trabajadoras sexuales en la ciudad de Barcelona" (PDF) (in Spanish). University of Barcelona.
- Charfolet, Marta Castillo; Echezarreta, Vanesa Sáiz; Gisbert, María Luisa Velasco; Sentís, María; Mantini, Marina (24 September 2014). "Estudio sobre el tratamiento publicitario e informativo de la prostitución y la trata de seres humanos con fines de explotación sexual en los medios de comunicación" (PDF). Red2Red Consultores (in Spanish). Ajuntament de Madrid. Archived from the original (PDF) on 21 October 2017.
- Curiel, Pedro Brufao (2008). Prostitución y políticas públicas : entre la reglamentación, la legalización y la abolición (PDF) (in Spanish). Madrid: Fundación Alternativas. ISBN 978-84-96653-97-9.
- Rodríguez-Armas, Lorenzo (2008). "Constitución española, estado social y derechos de las mujeres que ejercen la prostitución". Feminismo/s (in Spanish) (12): 253–270. doi:10.14198/fem.2008.12.10. hdl:10045/11671. ISSN 1696-8166.
- Sanz, Pablo Benlloch (2004). "¿Trabajadores del sexo?: algunas consideraciones sobre la reciente jurisprudencia sobre la materia". Aequalitas: Revista Jurídica de Igualdad de Oportunidades Entre Mujeres y Hombres (in Spanish) (14): 32–37. ISSN 1575-3379.
- Villa Camarma, Elvira (December 2010). "Estudio antropológico en torno a la prostitución". Cuicuilco (in Spanish). 17 (49): 157–179. ISSN 0185-1659.
- "Mujeres que ejercen la prostitución en la Comunidad Autónoma del País Vasco" (PDF) (in Basque). Emakunde. December 2007.
