= Alcázar of Toledo =

Fortress in Toledo, Spain

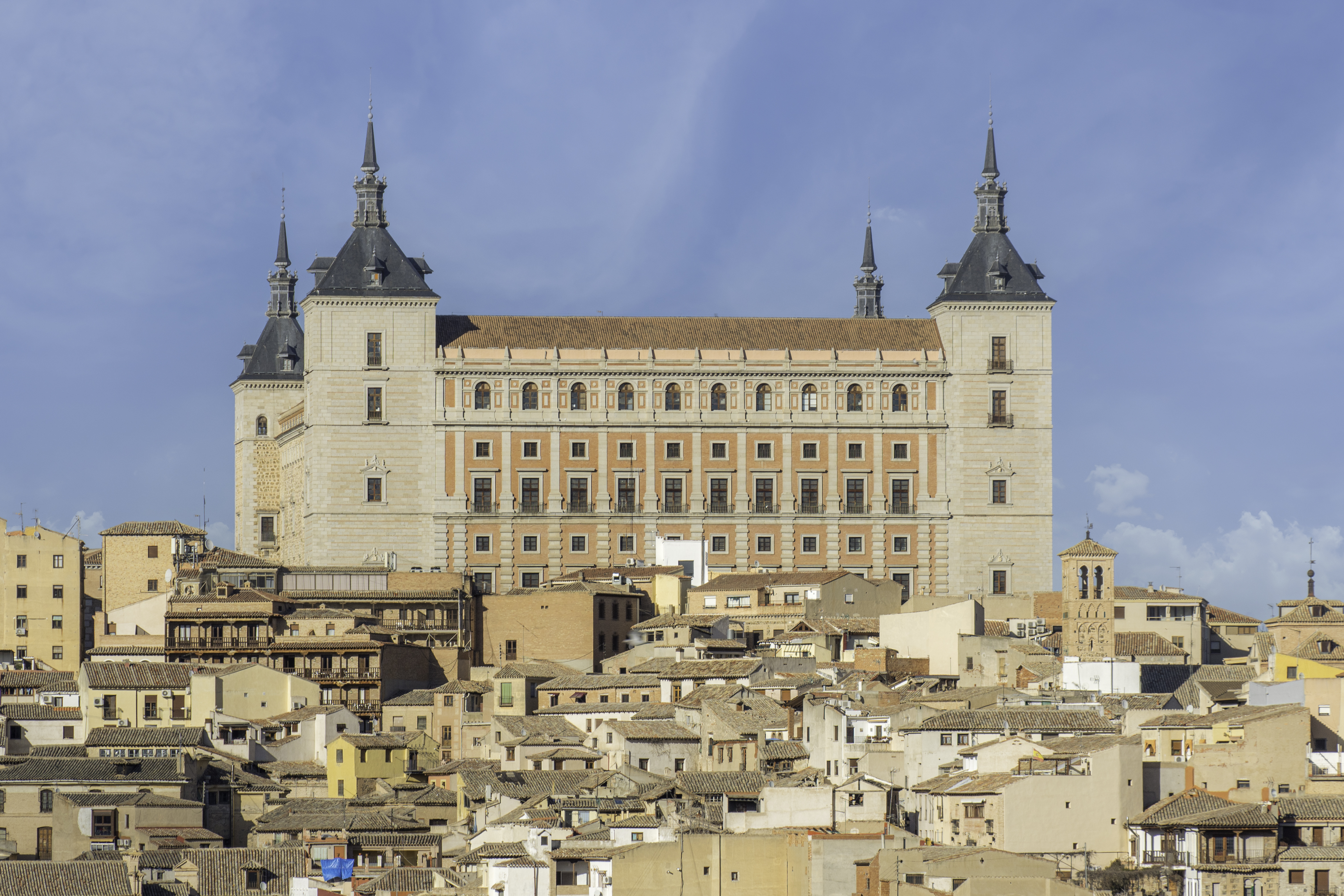
- The Alcázar in 2025
- Interactive map of the Alcázar of Toledo area

General information
- Coordinates: 39.858084°N 4.020631°W
- Year built: 1936—1957

Height
- Height: 59 m

The Alcázar of Toledo (Spanish: Alcázar de Toledo, IPA: [alˈkaθaɾ ðe toˈleðo]) is a stone fortification located in the highest part of Toledo, Spain. It is a large quadrangular building measuring 60 meters on a side, framed by four large towers 60 meters high, each crowned by the typical Madrid spire. Most of the building was rebuilt between 1939 and 1957 after the siege of the Alcázar during the Spanish Civil War.

== History ==
Once used as a Roman palace in the 3rd century, it was turned into a fortress in the 10th century during the reign of Cordoba Caliph Abd ar-Rahman III. It was restored under Charles I (Charles V, Holy Roman Emperor) and his son Philip II of Spain in the 1540s. In 1521, Hernán Cortés was received by Charles I at the Alcázar, following Cortes' conquest of the Aztecs. The name is from Arabic al-qasr 'the castle' (ultimately, from Latin 'castrum').

== Spanish Civil War ==
During the Spanish Civil War, Colonel José Moscardó Ituarte held the building against overwhelming Spanish Republican forces in the siege of the Alcázar. The incident became a central piece of Spanish Nationalist lore, especially the story of Moscardó's son Luis. The Republicans took 24-year-old Luis hostage, and demanded that the Alcázar be surrendered or they would kill him. After briefly speaking to his son on the phone to confirm this, Moscardó told Luis to "Commend your soul to God, shout 'Viva España!' and die like a hero."

Moscardó refused to surrender. Contemporary reports indicated that the Republicans then killed Moscardó's son. Other historians have reported that Luis was not in fact shot until a month later "in reprisal for an air raid". The dramatic story also camouflages the fact that the fate of a number of male hostages, mainly from the Guardia Civil, taken into the Alcázar at the beginning of the siege is unclear. Some sources say the men "were never heard of again". However at least one journalist who visited the Alcázar in the immediate aftermath of the siege saw a number of prisoners chained to a railing in a cellar.

The events of the Spanish Civil War at the Alcázar made the structure a symbol for Spanish Nationalism and inspired the naming of El Alcázar, a far-right newspaper that began during the civil war and ended during the Spanish transition to democracy as the mouthpiece for Búnker, a faction of Francoists who opposed reform after Francisco Franco's death.

By the end of the siege, the building had been severely damaged. After the war, it was rebuilt. It now houses the Mancha Regional Library ("Biblioteca Autonómica") and the Museum of the Army (Museo del Ejército), the latter having previously been housed in the Salón de Reinos in Madrid.

== Gallery ==
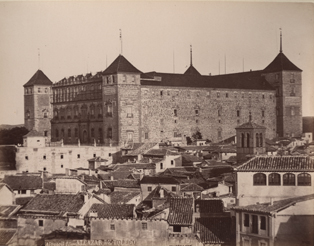
View of the Alcázar in 1866 by Casiano Alguacil

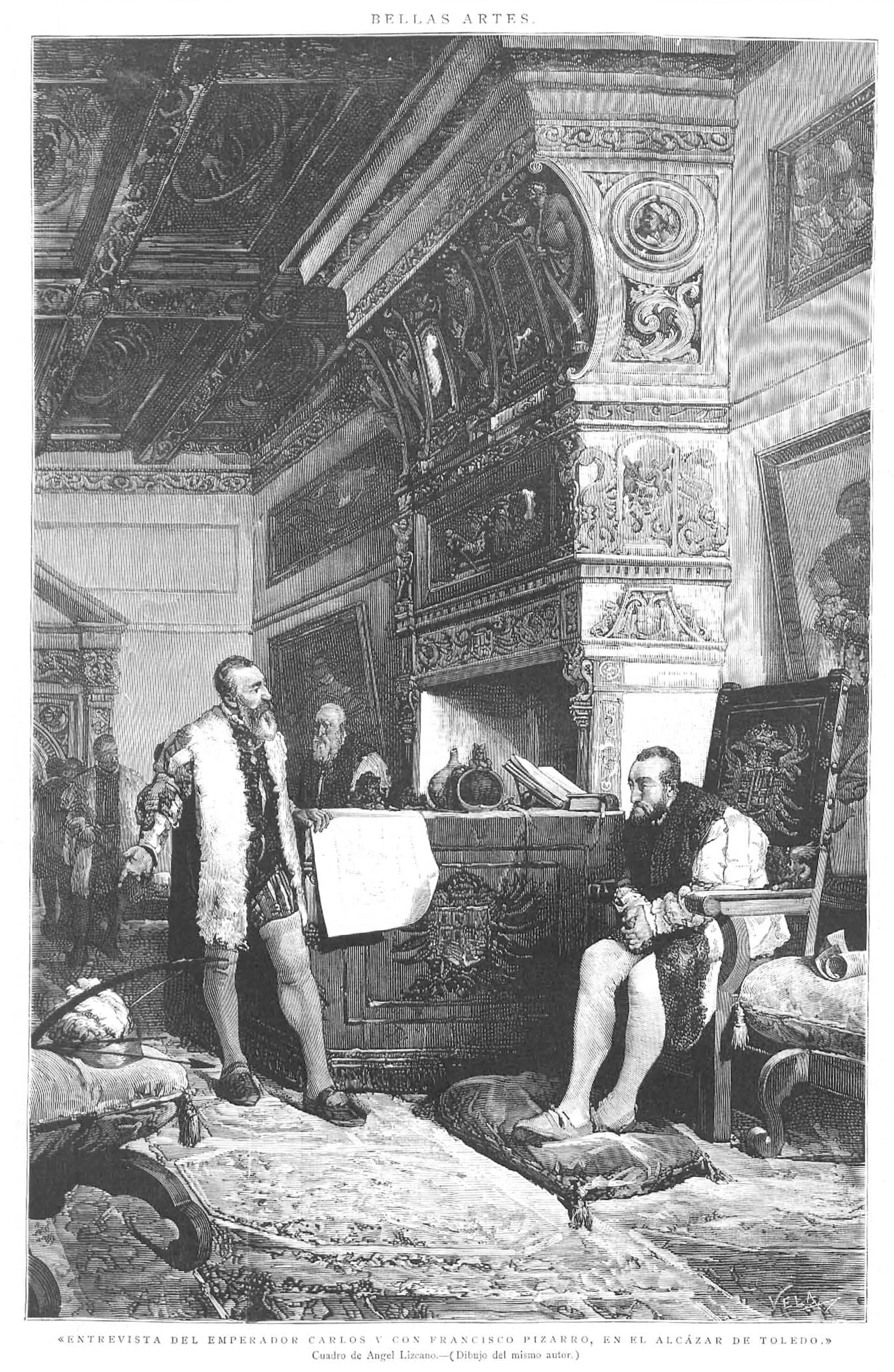
"Interview of Emperor Charles V with Francisco Pizarro in the Alcázar", ca. 1887 by Ángel Lizcano Monedero

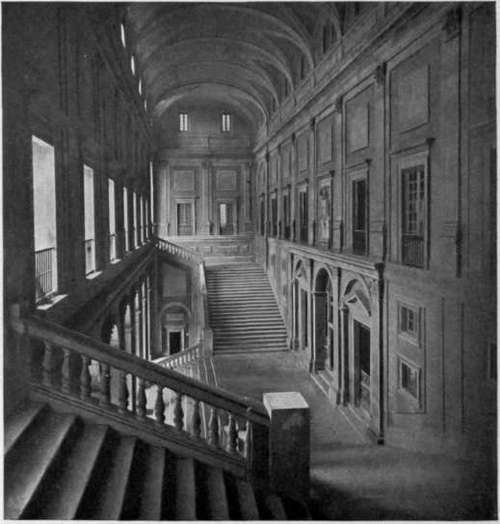
Interior of the Alcázar in 1901, Jean Laurent

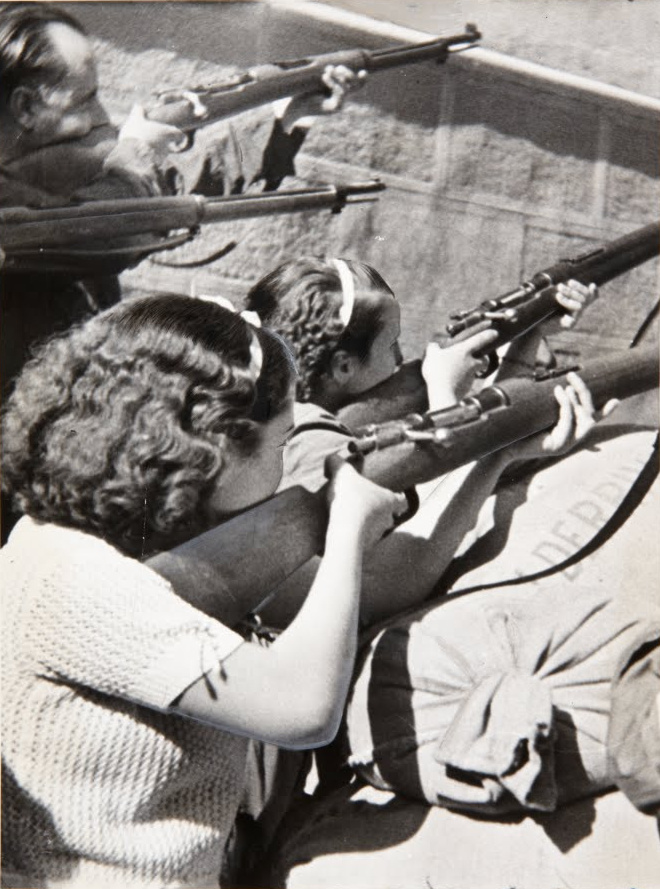
Two women and a man at the siege of the Alcázar in Toledo, 1936

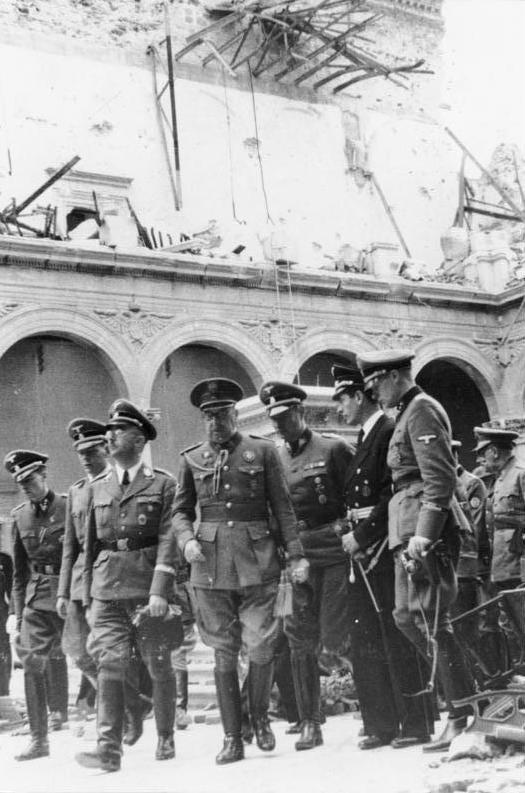
Heinrich Himmler visits the Alcázar with José Moscardó in October 1940

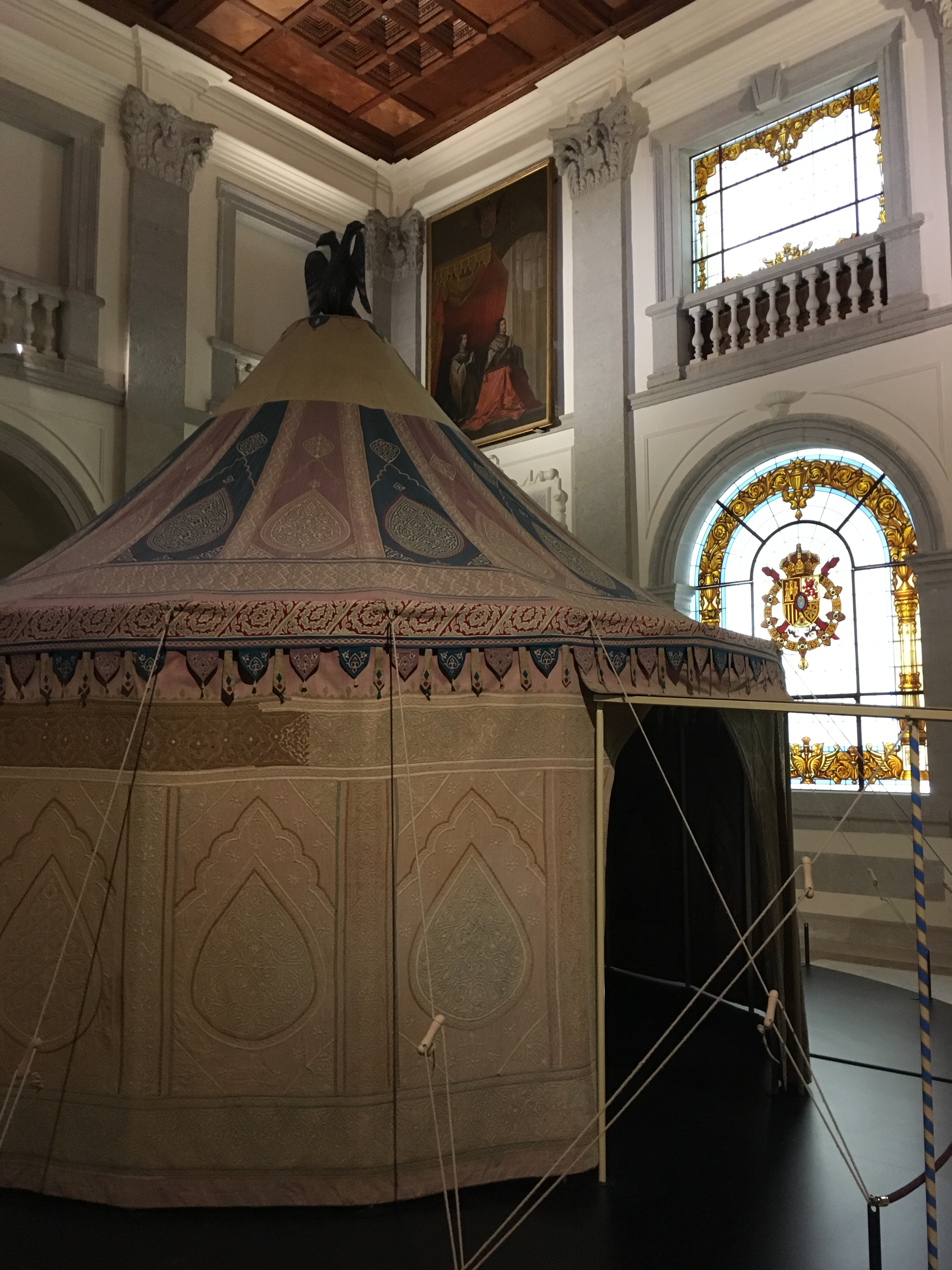
Tent of Charles V, Army Museum

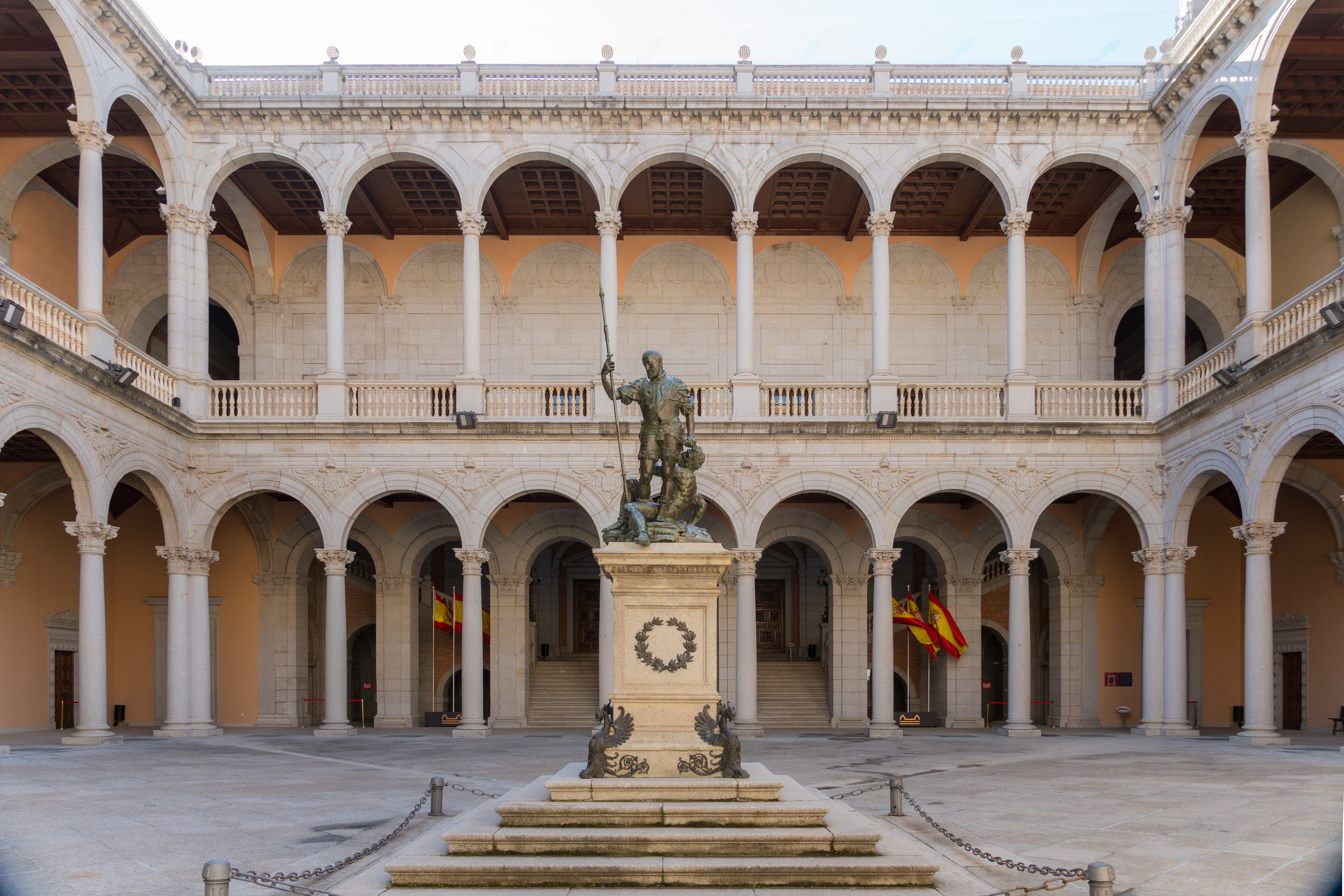
Inner courtyard in 2025

== Sources ==
- Cecil Eby, The Siege Of The Alcázar, 1965
- Hugh Thomas, The Spanish Civil War, 4th Rev. Ed. 2001.
- Antony Beevor, The Battle for Spain, 2006.
