= Blas Piñar =

Spanish politician

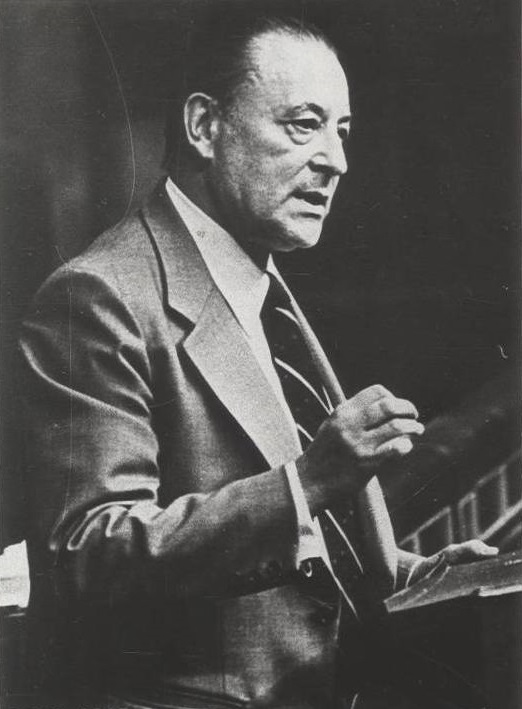
- Born: Blas Piñar López; 22 November 1918; Toledo, Kingdom of Spain
- Died: 28 January 2014 (aged 95); Madrid, Spain
- Education: University of Madrid
- Occupations: Politician, civil law notary, writer
- Political party: FET y de las JONS (1937–1976); New Force (1976–1982); National Front (1985–1993); Spanish Alternative (since 2003)
- Spouse: Carmen Gutiérrez Duque
- Children: 8

Blas Piñar López (22 November 1918 – 28 January 2014) was a Spanish far-right politician. Having connections to Catholic organizations, during the Francoist dictatorship he directed the Institute of Hispanic Culture (Instituto de Cultura Hispánica) and served as procurador in the Cortes and as national councillor (1955–1977). He later became a member of the Congress of Deputies in 1979. He led the far-right New Force and National Front political parties.

== Biography ==
Piñar was born in Toledo. He was a law student in Madrid when the Spanish Civil War broke out and took refuge in the embassies of Finland and Paraguay, later doing work as a clandestine "fifth columnist" for the Nationalist forces. From 1957 to 1962, he was in charge of the Institute of Hispanic Culture that was dedicated to managing scholarships between Latin American and Spanish universities. After a trip to Latin America and the Philippines, Piñar wrote an article for the Madrid newspaper ABC. The article, entitled "Hypocrites," harshly criticized the foreign policy of the United States. At that time, Francoist Spain depended on bilateral relations with the United States to maintain international recognition for the Francoist State. Franco's minister of Foreign Affairs, after giving many explanations to the US ambassador, dismissed Piñar. Despite the dismissal, Piñar's loyalty to the Francoist State did not diminish.

He was an opponent of the breakup of the regime. He voted and argued against the Political Reform Act. He saw the law not as an attempt at reform, but an attempt at disintegration. Piñar also opposed the Spanish Constitution of 1978 and voted against it in its entirety.

After the death of Franco, he created New Force (Fuerza Nueva), a National Catholic organization, and in 1979 was elected a deputy for the Unión Nacional coalition representing Madrid. Much like most of the deputies, he endured the 1981 Spanish coup attempt led by Antonio Tejero, for 18 hours. After the loss of his seat in the 1982 elections he dissolved Fuerza Nueva (not the publishing house of the same name which continued publishing). In 1986, with the aid of Jean-Marie Le Pen, he reconstructed the group as the National Front and stood without success for the European parliamentary elections of 1987 and 1989. In 1992 he became president of the Frente Nacional Español (Spanish National Front), the product of the union between his group and the Juntas Españolas.
