= New Force (Spain) =

New Force Fuerza Nueva
- Founder: Blas Piñar
- Founded: 1976
- Dissolved: 1982
- Split from: FET y de las JONS
- Succeeded by: National Front
- Youth wing: Fuerza Joven; Youth Front
- Paramilitary Wing: Youth Front
- Ideology: Spanish nationalism Ultranationalism; Francoism; Falangism; Neo-Fascism
- Political position: Far-right
- Congreso de los Diputados (1979): 1 / 350

New Force (Spanish: Fuerza Nueva, FN) was a far-right political party in Spain founded by Blas Piñar, director of the Institute of Hispanic Culture and longtime procurador in the Cortes Españolas during the Francoist period. Originally operating as a publishing house, FN sought to preserve Francoism in Spain during the transition to democracy. After its dissolution as a political party in 1982, it continued to operate as a publishing house under the same name, and its political activities and stylings were succeeded by the National Front party.

== Founding and activities as a political party ==
New Force was founded in 1966 as Fuerza Nueva Editorial SA, a publishing house of far-right and Francoist literature (by 1967 also a magazine of the same name). From the beginning, their literature was aimed at an audience of nostalgic Falangists and Francoists.

By 1976, Piñar reorganized FN as the only openly extreme right-wing party represented in the new Spanish democracy; its leadership consisted of Piñar and seven other Francoists, and was headed by General Álvaro de Lacalle Leloup, member of Opus Dei. FN sought for a continuation of Francoism in all its forms (whether taking cues from Falangism, Carlism, or Opus Dei Catholicism), and it rejected the constitutional monarchy of Juan Carlos I. FN's membership and supporter base was an amalgam of Catholic traditionalists, technocrats, Falangists, and Spanish nationalists.

During the first years of the transition to democracy, FN's members were involved in supporting and perpetrating a number of terrorist incidents and murders against striking workers, left-wing politicians, trade unionists, journalists, and student organizations. Examples include the murder of 21-year-old CNT member Jorge Caballero by ten members of Fuerza Joven (FN's youth organization), the Montejurra massacre, and several murders by the colluding Guerrilleros de Cristo Rey. One of the most significant terrorist incidents supported by FN was the 1977 Atocha massacre, in which members of FN and the Guerrilleros de Cristo Rey assassinated labour activists affiliated with the Communist Party of Spain; the attack, which was intended to spur a right wing coup d'état in the country, instead led to the arrest and sentencing of five FN affiliates to a collective 464 years in prison.

In the 1977 Spanish general election, the first free election since the Spanish Civil War, FN was represented by the National Alliance July 18 coalition, an organization that also included the re-founded Falange Española de las JONS and the Carlist Traditionalist Communion; this coalition failed to achieve any seats, earning only 0.37% of the vote.

In the 1979 elections, the coalition was renamed the National Union, and received 2.69% of the vote (378,964 votes). As this percentage was enough to earn one seat in the Congress of Deputies, Blas Piñar was elected as deputy of Madrid. The majority of parliamentary interventions by Piñar were centred on issues of post-transition Spain, denouncing topics such as separatism, abortion, and economic mismanagement.

New Force disappeared officially as a party on 20 November 1982, after the breakup of the National Union coalition and further losses of support. Standing alone in the 1982 general election, FN obtained only 0.52% of the vote (108,746 votes total), and Piñar lost his seat in Congress. Internal fights aggravated the crisis within the FN and sparked the appearance of a breakaway movement that culminated in the creation of the Hispanic Union (UH).

A number of leaders of later nationalist parties passed through FN's youth organization, Fuerza Joven ("Young Force"), including José Luis Corral (leader of Movimiento Católico Español), Rafael López-Diéguez (general secretary of Spanish Alternative), and Ricardo Sáenz de Ynestrillas Pérez (of the Alliance for National Unity coalition). Other significant figures who were previously members are José Maria del Nido, president of Sevilla FC from 2002 to 2013, and Javier Tebas, lawyer and president of the Liga Nacional de Fútbol Profesional.

As a political party, FN was succeeded by the National Front, founded under the same acronym and logo with the assistance of the French National Front (now the National Rally) and the Italian Social Movement. It dissolved in 1993.

== Operation as a publishing house ==
As a publishing house, Fuerza Nueva Editorial published a number of nationalist, anti-Marxist, and even antisemitic books. Featured authors included Francoist Prime Minister Luis Carrero Blanco and Belgian politician and Nazi collaborator Léon Degrelle. Most frequently published were the works of Piñar himself, and of Horia Sima, the ousted Romanian fascist leader, who lived in Spain until his death. Piñar's works focused on promoting Spanish nationalism and unity, whereas Sima's works (including What is Communism?, What is Nationalism?, The Christian Man and Political Action, and Strategies in the Struggle Against Communism) were primarily anti-Marxist, anti-Masonic, and antisemitic in nature.

Though ceasing to exist as a political party, FN continued its activities as a publishing house after 1982, including continuing to publish its magazine of the same name. The magazine, under the editorship of Luis Fernandez Villamea, was published weekly (and then biweekly) until its 1466th issue in March 2017.

== See also ==
- Blas Piñar
- History of the far-right in Spain
- Spain under Franco
- Spanish transition to democracy
