= Agapito García Atadell =

- Born: May 28, 1902; Viveiro, Spain
- Died: July 15, 1937 (aged 35); Sevilla, Spain
- Cause of death: Garrote vil
- Occupations: Typesetter, printer, and politician
- Political party: Spanish Socialist Workers' Party

Agapito García Atadell (May 28 1902-July 15 1937) was a Spanish typesetter and political activist. He is known for his role during the Spanish Civil War, having led a "checa" in Madrid during the first months of the conflict and for his participation in political repression by the Republican government. He fled to France shortly before the Battle of Madrid, he was captured by the Francoists, tried and executed.

== Biography ==
Born in the Galician town of Viveiro on May 28, 1902, he was a typographer by profession.

Over time he would join the Unión General de Trabajadores (UGT) —as well as the Agrupación Socialista de Madrid—, becoming part of its association of typographers and printers. From that moment on, he began to participate in political and trade union activities. After the split of 1921, he briefly joined the Communist Party of Spain, where he became secretary of the Communist Youth. Later, in 1928, he requested to be readmitted to the UGT and the Agrupación Socialista. In 1931, he became a member of the UGT's federal executive committee. As a typesetter, he worked for the Madrid newspapers La Voz and El Sol. After the revolution of 1934, he was arrested and imprisoned for some time.

In 1934, he married Piedad Domínguez Díaz.

During the 1936 Spanish election, he was part of the armed escort of the socialist leader Indalecio Prieto. (Note: As Paul Preston noted, García Atadell claimed to have maintained a friendly relationship with Prieto—an assertion that, according to Preston, lacks credibility.)

=== Spanish Civil War ===
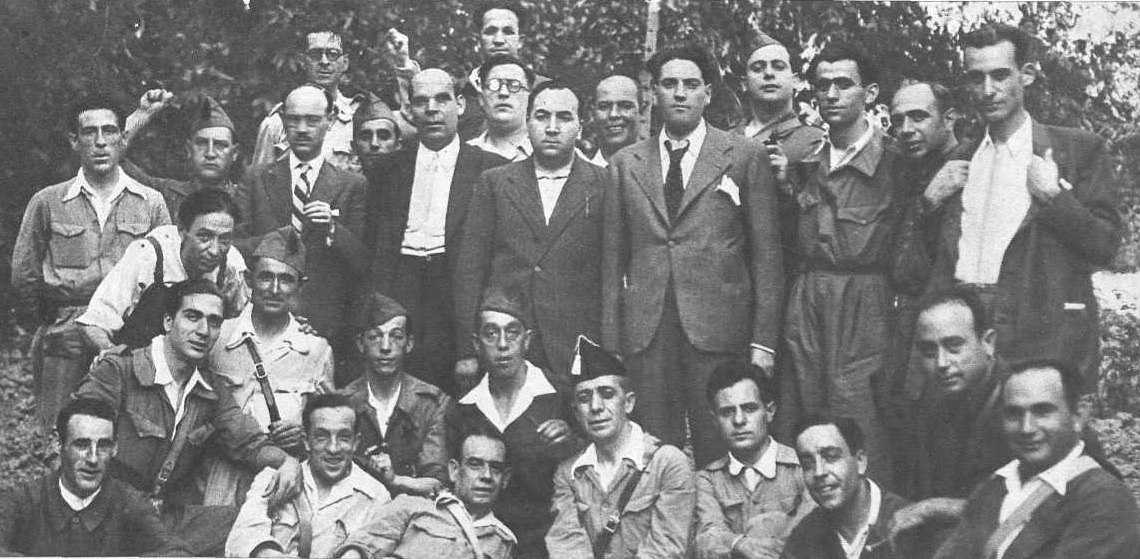
The socialist deputies Ramón Lamoneda, Anastasio de Gracia and Jerónimo Bugeda, with the director of the Milicias de Investigación, Agapito García Atadell, and a group of militiamen who worked under his orders.

With the outbreak of the Civil War, the Republic’s police forces had been seriously disorganized, and many of their members were considered disloyal to the republican regime. The Minister of the Interior, Sebastián Pozas, provisionally appointed about a hundred new police officers, most of them of socialist leanings. On the recommendation of the PSOE executive committee, García was appointed chief of the so‑called "Popular Militias of Investigation," a special group within the Brigada de Investigación Criminal of the police. (Note: The "Popular Militias of Investigation" are sometimes incorrectly referred to as the "Dawn Brigade", since García Atadell’s group often operated in close coordination with the so‑called "Dawn Patrol" — another paramilitary group that operated in Madrid during the first weeks of the war — to the point that their activities and even their identities are often confused. For this reason, it has been mistakenly believed that García Atadell himself was the chief of the "Dawn Brigade".) García theoretically operated under the orders of the head of the Brigada de Investigación Criminal, police inspector Antonio Lino.

The section commanded by García set itself up in the palace of the Counts of Rincón in Madrid, located at the corner of Martínez de la Rosa Street and the Paseo de la Castellana; this building had been confiscated by the authorities. There they established a "checa" made up of forty‑eight agents, all of them newly appointed, with Ángel Pedrero García acting as deputy chief, while Luis Ortuño and Antonio Albiach Chiralt served as group leaders. Although this unit theoretically depended on the regular police, it did not take long before it detached itself from police control and ended up assuming a great degree of operational autonomy.

During its existence, the group that came to be known as the "Dawn Brigade" (Spanish: Brigada del amanecer) carried out numerous arrests and home searches, acting with violence and without any judicial process; it was responsible for nearly 800 arrests. In addition, the detentions served as a source of funding, as they collected large amounts of money, jewelry, and works of art; many detainees were kept in captivity until they paid a ransom. García Atadell took part in numerous sham trials in which those detained by his paramilitary group were sentenced to death or imprisonment, although in other cases they were released. (Note: Later on, once he was a prisoner of the Francoist faction, he admitted that under his direction around one hundred people had been taken to the outskirts of Madrid and illegally executed. Nevertheless, Ángel Pedrero García — García Atadell’s deputy — denied in 1940 having any involvement in these killings.) Nevertheless, most of the prisoners García's brigade were handed over to the Directorate‑General for Security, as were the weapons or valuable objects that had been seized. Besides these kinds of actions, the unit's personnel also carried out important operations against the Fifth Column, as well as the arrest of saboteurs and snipers and the dismantling of espionage circles. (Note: In this regard, one of the most notable actions was the search of the residence that General Francisco Franco had in Madrid. There, weapons and a large amount of correspondence he had maintained with other conspirators in the period prior to the war were found.)

García usually made sure that the republican press — particularly the newspaper Informaciones — gave wide coverage to the activities of his group, which led to it gaining notoriety in the republican zone. On 24 September 1936, his unit carried out the arrest of Rosario Queipo de Llano, sister of General Gonzalo Queipo de Llano, an action that brought great fame to García . (Note: Although, as Paul Preston points out, Rosario Queipo Llano herself would later confess that it had in fact been she who had decided to turn herself in to the García Atadell brigade out of fear of being arrested by the anarchist militias and in the hope of being exchanged in the future.) Nevertheless, as historian Julius Ruiz has pointed out, the role and importance of the García's brigade in the repression that took place in Madrid during the first weeks of the conflict have subsequently been exaggerated.

=== Flight and capture ===
In October 1936, the activity of the García Atadell group had declined significantly, and Agapito himself began to be questioned by some republican sectors. At the end of October, the British chargé d’affaires, George Ogilvie‑Forbes, met with García and made him aware of the poor international image his actions were creating, something he blamed on anarchists and communists. Aware that Francoist troops were approaching Madrid and that the city might be captured, García decided to flee together with his wife — Piedad Domínguez Díaz — and two of his collaborators, Luis Ortuño and Pedro Penabad. García, Ortuño, and Penabad gathered several suitcases filled with money and valuables, the product of their lootings and seizures — some sources estimate the amount of the haul at twenty‑five million pesetas. They reached Alicante, where they obtained false Cuban passports and boarded a ship that took them to the French port of Marseille. Once their escape became evident, the republican press reacted and began to attack García harshly.

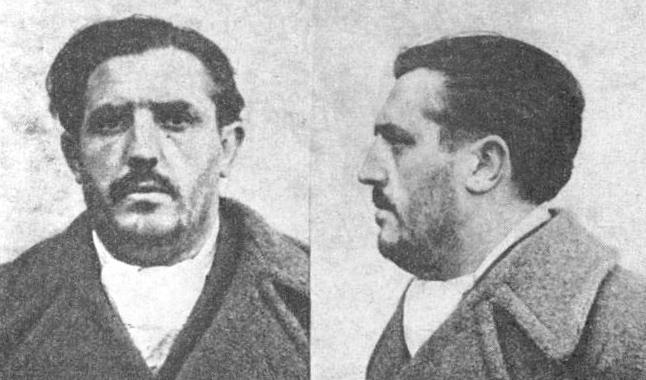
Two photographs taken in 1937, after his arrest by the Francoists.

The filmmaker Luis Buñuel, alerted by a French trade unionist to García's presence, informed the republican ambassador in Paris, Luis Araquistáin, who in turn notified the French authorities so that they could arrest him. Buñuel, who worked for the republic's intelligence services, described García as "a bandit, a scoundrel, pure and simple, who proclaimed himself a socialist. In the first months of the war, he had created in Madrid, with a small group of murderers, the sinister Dawn Brigade. Early in the morning, they would force their way into a bourgeois home, take the men ‘for a walk,’ rape the women, and steal everything within reach"; he was "one of the shames of the Republic." The information that led to his arrest was given to Buñuel by a French trade unionist who worked in a hotel. García Atadell was carrying a suitcase full of stolen jewelry and traveling under a false name. Araquistáin’s warning was issued through "a neutral embassy." Although extradition was requested, the petition arrived too late, as he had already boarded a ship bound for the Americas. For this reason, the republican government authorized Araquistáin to alert the Francoist authorities, through a neutral embassy, of García Atadell's presence on a ship scheduled to stop in Vigo and the Canary Islands. When the ship stopped in Vigo, the French government initially did not authorize the arrest. Finally, García and Pedro Penabad were arrested on 24 November 1936 during a stopover in Santa Cruz de La Palma.

After undergoing several interrogations, he was later transferred to Seville, where the investigations continued. He spent several months confined in the maximum‑security wing of the provincial prison of Seville. According to historians Hugh Thomas and Sara Izquierdo Álvarez, during his time in prison he converted to Catholicism. On the day of his execution he wrote:

I am no longer a socialist. I die a Catholic.

Ya no soy socialista. Muero siendo católico.

— Agapito García Atadell, to Indalecio Prieto

After being tried by a tribunal, he was sentenced to death and executed by garrote in July 1937. The executioner was a corporal of the prison's Security Guards, acting in place of the official executioner, Cándido Cartón.

== Sources ==
- Alcalá, César (2007). Las checas del terror (in Spanish). Madrid: LibrosLibres. ISBN 978-84-96088-59-7.
- Buñuel, Luis (2010). Mi último suspiro (in Spanish). Zaragoza: Heraldo de Aragón. ISBN 978-84-7610-103-2.
- Botana Iglesias, Rocío (2012). O movemento obreiro socialista na provincia de Lugo (1902-11936) (in Galician). Santiago de Compostela: Fundación Luís Tilve. ISBN 978-84-95773-26-5. Archived from the original on 6 May 2019.
- Castillo, Santiago; et al. (1979). Historia del socialismo en Aragón. PSOE-UGT (1879-1936) (in Spanish). Universidad de Zaragoza.
- García Márquez, José María (2014). "Prisión Provincial Ranilla". Lugares de la memoria: golpe militar, resistencia y represión en Sevilla : itinerarios (PDF) (in Spanish). Seville: Aconcagua Libros. ISBN 978-84-942792-8-7.
- Gubern, Román; Hammond, Paul (2009). Luis Buñuel: The Red Years, 1929–1939 (in Spanish). University of Wisconsin Press. ISBN 978-0-299-28474-9.
- Montero, Felix (2018). La muerte en Sevilla de Agapito Garcia Atadell (in Spanish).
- Montoliú, Pedro (2005). "Más que un desfile". Madrid en la posguerra. 1939-1946: los años de la represión (in Spanish). Madrid: Sílex. ISBN 84-7737-159-8.
- Morán, Gregorio (1986). Miseria y grandeza del Partido Comunista de España: 1939-1985 (in Spanish). Barcelona: Planeta.
- Preston, Paul (2013) [2011]. El Holocausto Español. Odio y Exterminio en la Guerra Civil y después (in Spanish). Barcelona: Debolsillo.
- Romero García, Eladio (2014). Garrote vil. Rituales de ejecución, verdugos y reos en la España contemporánea (in Spanish). Ediciones Nowtilus. ISBN 9788499675985.
- Ruiz, Julius (2014). The 'Red Terror' and the Spanish Civil War: Revolutionary Violence in Madrid. Cambridge University Press. ISBN 978-1-107-05454-7.
- Thomas, Hugh (1976). Historia de la Guerra Civil Española (in Spanish). Barcelona: Círculo de Lectores. ISBN 84-226-0874-X.
- Izquierdo Álvarez, Sara (2018). "Geografía e historia de una huida y un exilio: Piedad Domínguez Díaz, esposa de Agapito García Atadell" (pdf). Aportes (in Spanish). 97 (2/2018): 163–204. ISSN 0213-5868.
- Zavala, José María (2006). "Atadell, el asesino enmascarado". Los gánsters de la Guerra Civil (in Spanish). Plaza & Janés. pp. 143–191. ISBN 84-01-37948-2.
- ——— (2015). Franco con franqueza: Anecdotario privado del personaje más público (in Spanish). Plaza & Janés. ISBN 9788401017124.
