= Visit of Heinrich Himmler to Spain in 1940 =

Official visit by Heinrich Himmler to Spain

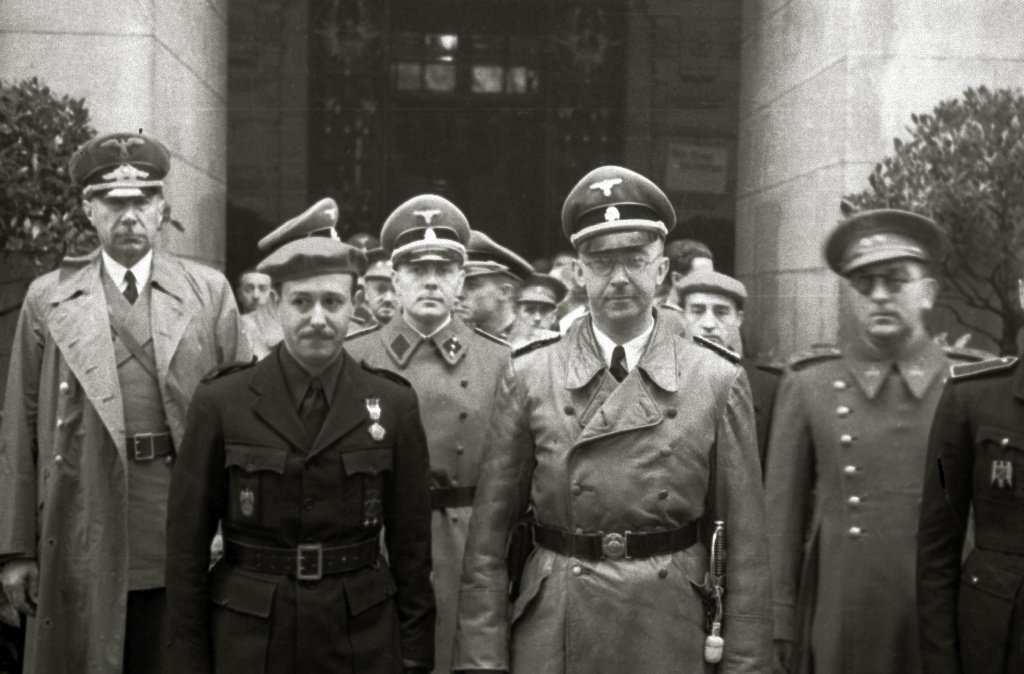
Himmler in San Sebastián with José Finat and Gerardo Caballero.

The visit of Nazi leader Heinrich Himmler to Spain in October 1940 had a major propaganda component for the Francoist regime, which at that time was invested in a diplomatic rapprochement with Nazi Germany with the anticipation of Spain's entry into World War II in support of the Axis powers. Himmler's stay in Spain took place between 19 and 24 October. It was one of the very few trips that the Nazi leader made to neutral countries.

== The course of the visit ==
Himmler had accepted the invitation extended by Director General of Security José Finat y Escrivá de Romaní, whom he had met in Berlin in August of that year. The main purpose of the visit was to inspect the Spanish security forces, discuss Spanish-German police cooperation, and prepare for the planned meeting between Franco and Hitler. However, the official version at the time depicted this visit more like a mere tourist trip.

Himmler was accompanied by a German entourage, including close aides such as Karl Wolff and Joachim Peiper. On the morning of 19 October, the Nazi leader entered the country via the border control checkpoint at Irun, where he was received by, among others, the director general of security; the commander of the Sixth Military Region, General José López-Pinto Berizo; the German ambassador to Spain, Eberhard von Stohrer; the head of the Gestapo in Madrid, Paul Winzer; and the president of the Nazi Party in Spain, Hans Thomsen. Shortly after crossing the border, he stopped in San Sebastián, where he was the guest of honor of the local authorities and visited various sites. He made another stop in Burgos and visited its famous cathedral. While in this city, he met and had dinner with Franco. On the morning of 20 October, he arrived at the Estación del Norte railway station in Madrid, where he was received by a military retinue, the German ambassador in Madrid and Ramón Serrano Suñer. (Note: Among those who received Himmler in Madrid were representatives of the German colony, members of the Francoist government, and top Falangist officials, such as Pilar Primo de Rivera—head of the Sección Femenina (Women's Section)—or Gerardo Salvador Merino—head of the Sindicato Vertical (Spanish Syndical Organization).) In the streets of the capital city, decorated with Nazi flags, he was received by Falangists in uniform and members of the Armed Police Corps. The regime's official newspaper, Arriba, was not sparing of praise for the foreign dignitary, going so far as to comment con hombres como Himmler llegan a su cenit los Estados fuertes. (Note: English: With men like Himmler, strong States reach their zenith.) After meeting with Serrano Suñer at the headquarters of the Foreign Ministry, Franco received him at the Royal Palace of El Pardo. The Spanish dictator, who—according to British Ambassador Samuel Hoare—had received Himmler like a "sovereign prince," made a poor impression on the Nazi leader. Himmler later attended a bullfight offered in his honor at the Las Ventas ring, organized by José Finat himself. As the newspaper of the Nazi Party, Völkischer Beobachter, reported it, he was greeted with great applause upon his arrival. Bullfighters Pepe Luis Vázquez, Marcial Lalanda, and Rafael Ortega Gómez (Gallito) took part in the bullfight. Himmler was horrified by what he saw and would later express his displeasure with the bullfight, referring to it as a "cruel" spectacle.

Serrano Suñer used this visit to boost his political position within the regime. Since he was not satisfied with the coverage by the regime's press outlets, he gave instructions to Enrique Giménez-Arnau—the general director of the press—so that newspapers such as ABC, Ya, or Arriba would [estar] a la altura de las circunstancias. (Note: English: Rise to the occasion)

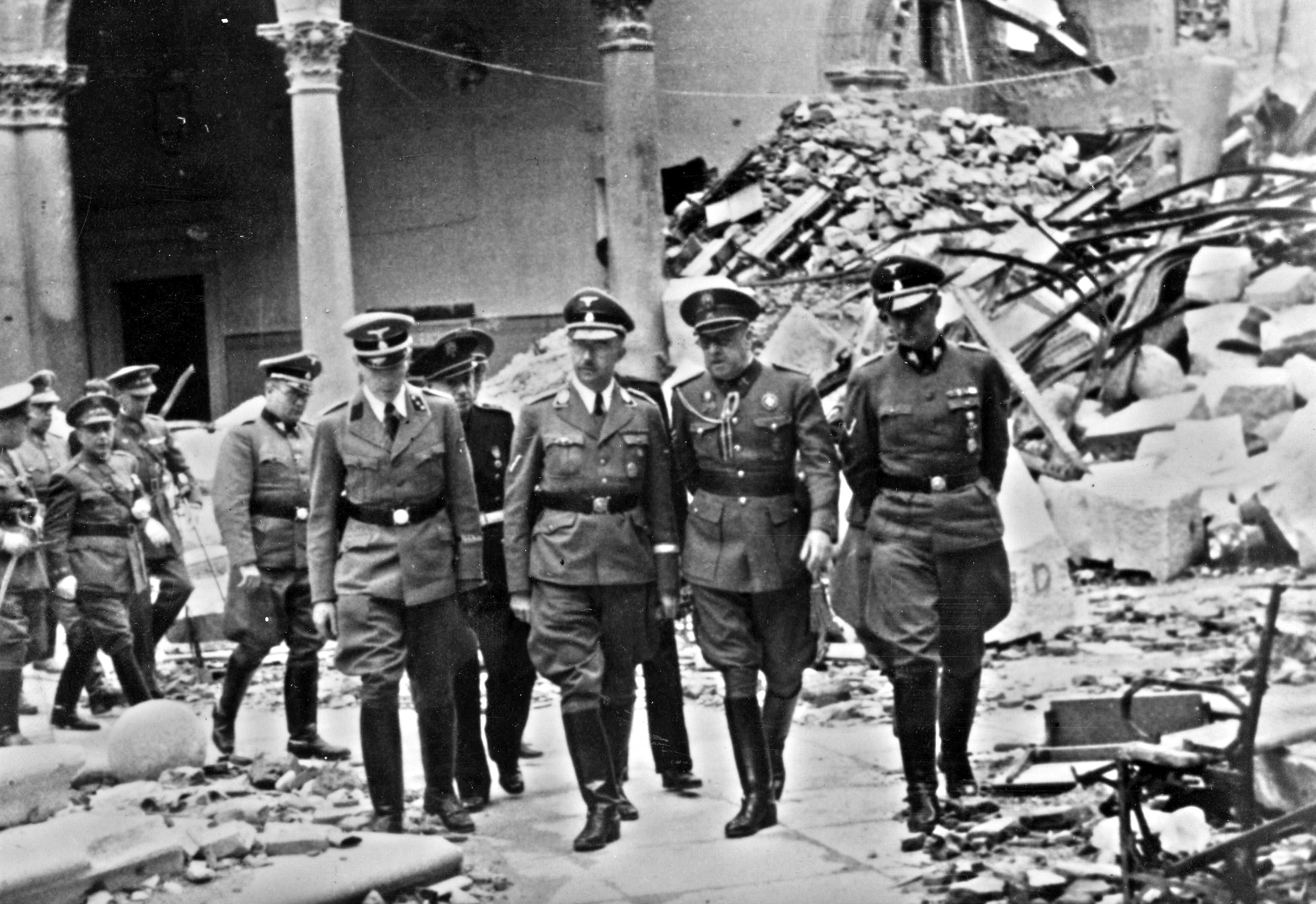
Himmler and General José Moscardó Ituarte visiting the ruins of the Alcázar of Toledo. Also with them is Karl Wolff.

The following day, Himmler travelled to El Escorial (Note: At El Escorial, the entourage also visited the tomb of José Antonio Primo de Rivera—the founder of the Falange Española—where they laid a wreath.) and to the former capital of the Visigothic Kingdom, Toledo, where he toured the ruins of the Alcázar. Spanish archaeologist Julio Martínez Santa-Olalla, an ardent Nazi sympathizer, was assigned to the entourage and accompanied Himmler during these visits. In the evening, Himmler attended a dinner at the Hotel Ritz in Madrid, organized by José Finat, with the top Falangist officials in attendance. In the morning of 22 October, Himmler paid a visit to the Prado Museum, the headquarters of Falangist aid organization Auxilio Social, and the National Archaeological Museum—where he meticulously studied a map of the Germanic invasions—and then in the afternoon, gave a speech at the Madrid headquarters of the Nazi Party. During his speech, Himmler announced that "all Jews from the Greater Germanic Reich would be placed in a 'closed ghetto' in the General Government."

After their stay in the capital, the German entourage headed to Barcelona by plane. In the morning of 23 October, Himmler landed in El Prat Airport, where he was received by military and civilian authorities. Accompanied by the Captain General of Catalonia, General Luis Orgaz Yoldi, and Barcelona Mayor Miguel Mateu y Pla, he attended a folklore presentation at the Poble Espanyol in Montjuïc. In Barcelona, Himmler and his entourage stayed at the Ritz. At around 3:30 p.m., the entourage went to visit the Montserrat Abbey, well known in relation to the Holy Grail tradition. In fact, Himmler firmly believed that Montserrat was really the "Monsalvat" depicted in Richard Wagner's opera Parsifal. One of the monks, Andreu Ripoll Noble, was the only one who could speak German and thus he served as interpreter for the group of visitors. Himmler—who on several occasions explained to the monks the Germanic and pagan origin of Montserrat—asked to see the archives related to the location of the Holy Grail, although the monks pointed out to him that it was not there. Upon their return to Barcelona, the members of the entourage visited the German consulate and later attended a dinner hosted by the City Council. After the dinner, Himmler and other Francoist leaders visited a former Republican checa located in Vallmajor street. The following day, he boarded a plane and returned to Germany.

While the Nazi leader was in Barcelona, his portfolio, carrying secret documents, went missing. (Note: In fact, some authors have hinted at the British secret service as being behind this incident.)

== Significance and transcendence ==
During his tour around Spain, Himmler also visited some prisons and Francoist concentration camps. The Nazi leader was stunned by the magnitude and harshness of the Francoist repression. Nonetheless, his reaction was not motivated by humanitarian reasons. Rather, by the fact that he believed the level of repression was "politically" counterproductive and also because of how absurd it was to exterminate valuable labor when there was an urgent need for workers in order to rebuild the country. In light of the depressed atmosphere that Himmler found during his stay in the capital, he recommended Franco and Serrano Suñer to turn the page "so as to prevent all national life from continuing to revolve around the national tragedy."

Himmler held several meetings with Serrano, after which they reached an agreement to strengthen the political and police cooperation between both countries: the Gestapo would open an office at the German Embassy in Madrid and the Sicherheitsdienst (SD) would establish delegations in each German consulate in Spanish soil, while the Nazi agents acting in the Spanish territory would have diplomatic immunity. In return, Spanish agents acting in Germany and occupied France would also have immunity. Likewise, Himmler made sure that one of his deputies who was already operating in the country, Paul Winzer, would train the new Spanish secret police. These agreements would ultimately join the one signed in 1938, which provided for the mutual extradition of detainees between both countries and the establishment of an SD network. Apart from police matters, some issues related to Nazi propaganda in Spain were also discussed.

== Image gallery ==
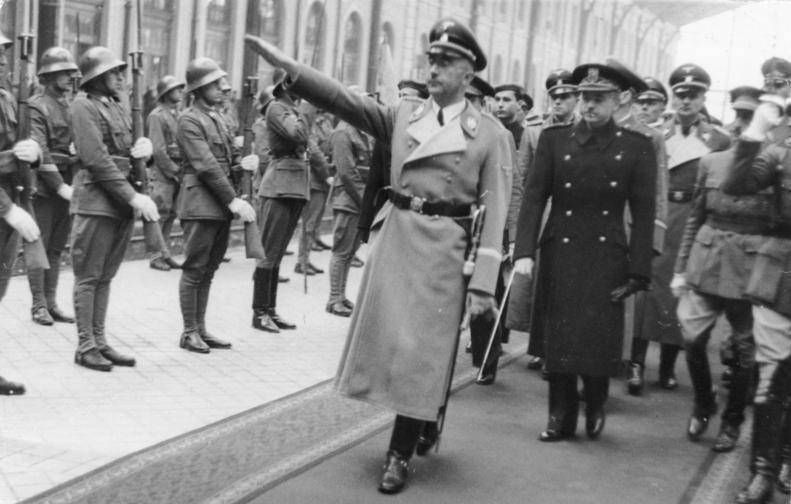
Himmler, received with honors at the Estación del Norte railway station in Madrid.

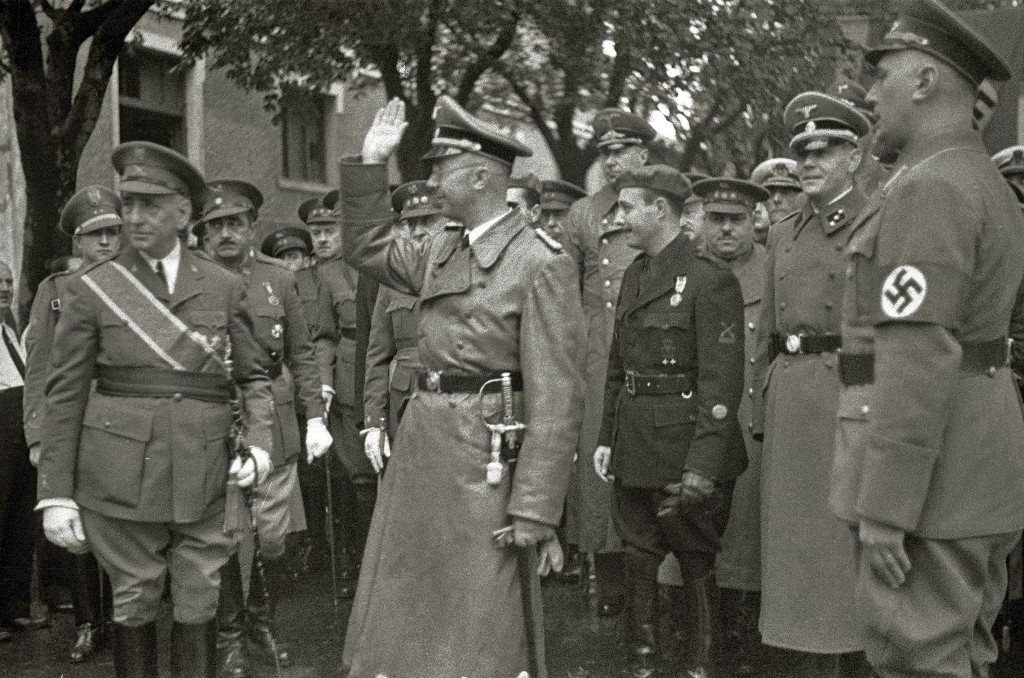
Himmler in Irun, after arriving in Spain.

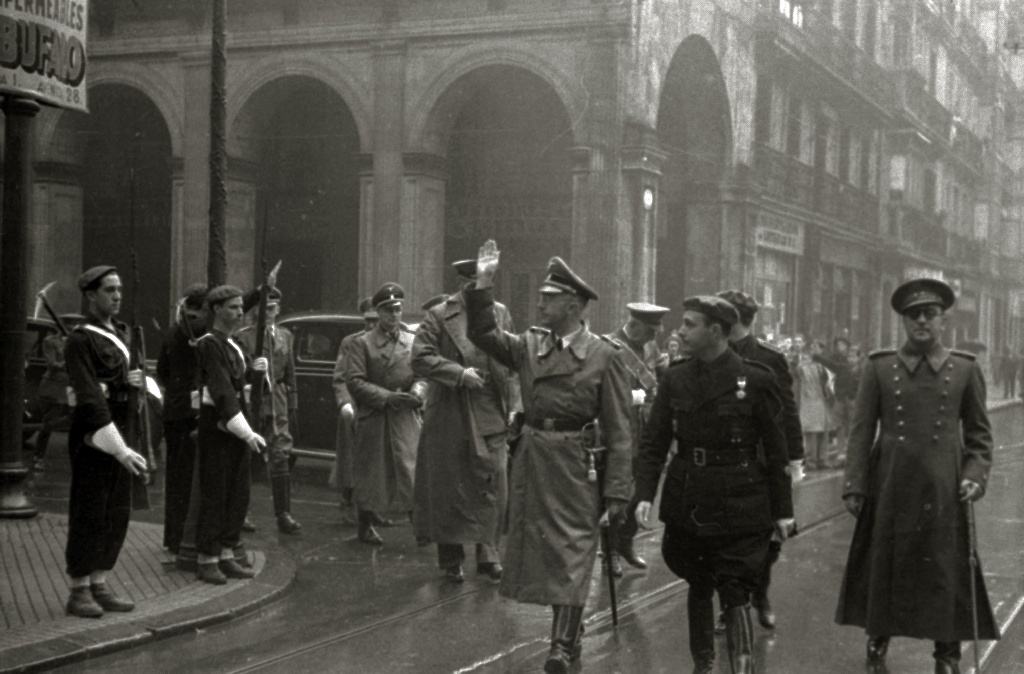
Strolling through the streets of San Sebastián.

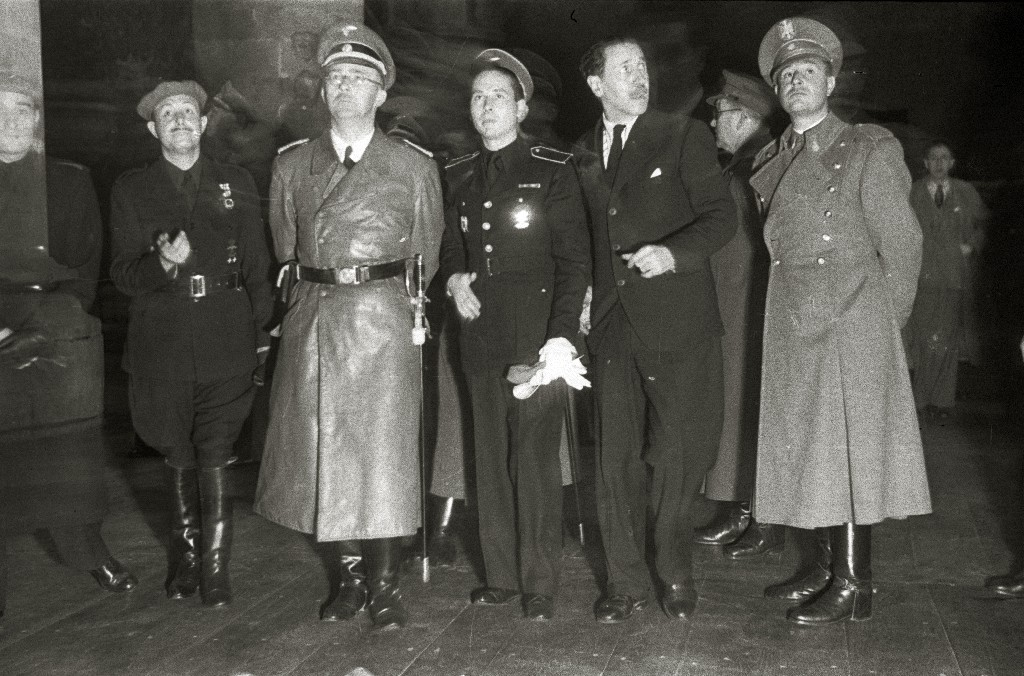
Visiting the San Telmo Museum in San Sebastián.

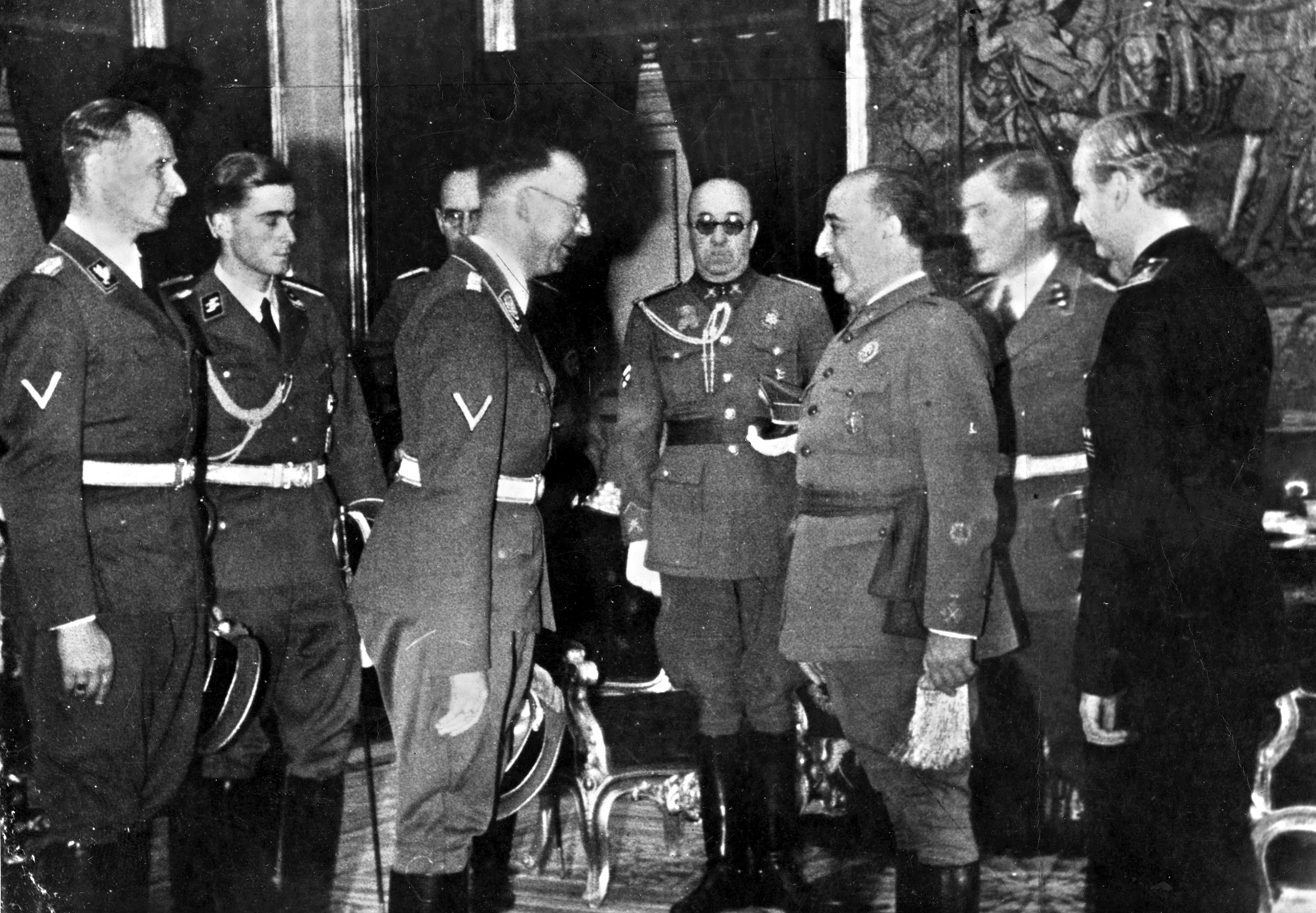
Next to Franco and Serrano Suñer, at the reception in the Royal Palace of El Pardo.

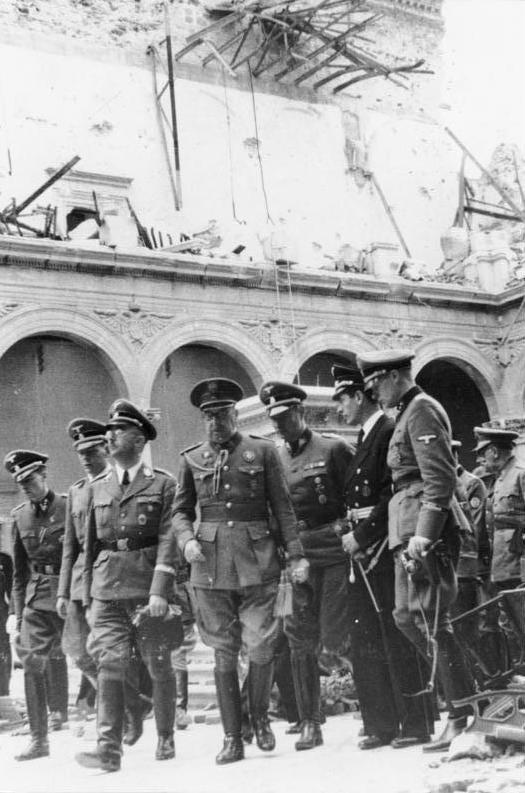
Visiting the ruins of the Alcázar of Toledo.

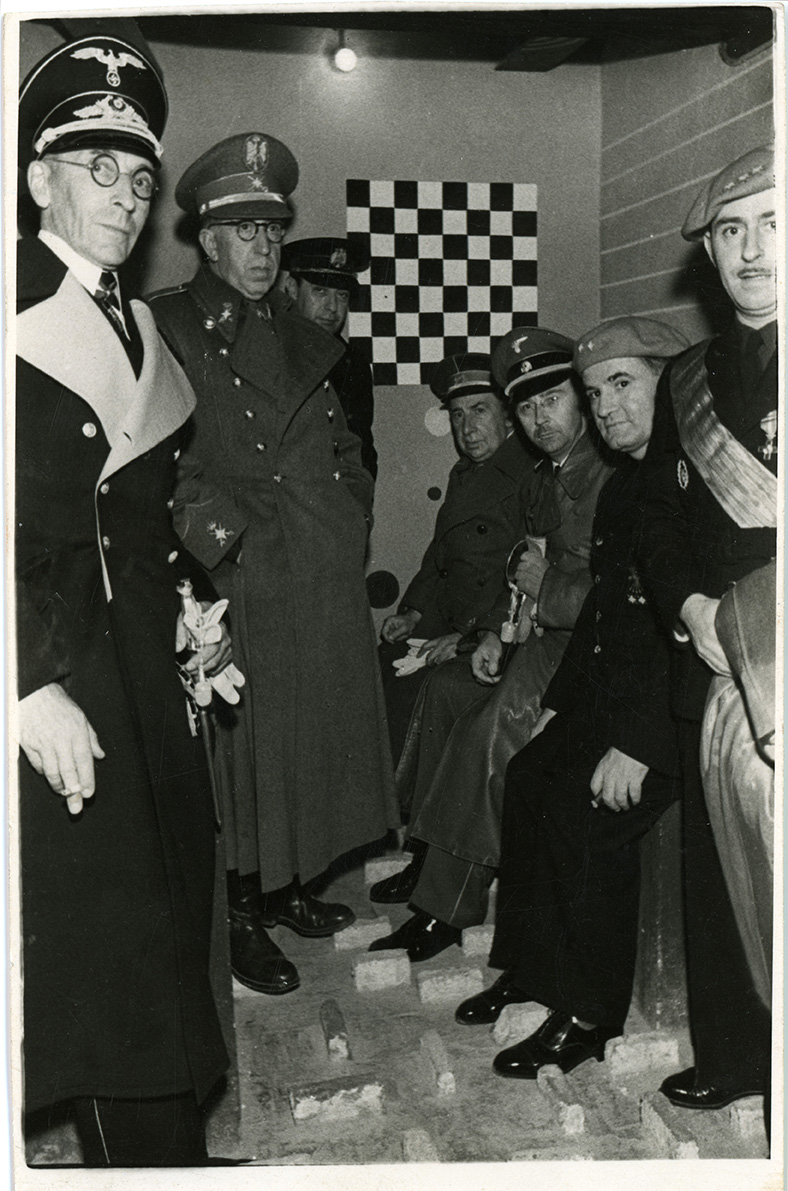
Visiting an old checa in Barcelona.

== See also ==
- Gerardo Caballero
- Meeting at Hendaye
- Jewish Archive (Francoist Spain)

== Bibliography ==
- Agte, Patrick (1999). Jochen Peiper: Commander, Panzerregiment Leibstandarte. Winnipeg, Manitoba, Canada: J.J. Fedorowicz Publishing. ISBN 978-0921991465.
- Alcalá, César (2007). Las checas del terror: la desmemoria histórica al descubierto (in Spanish). Madrid, Spain: LibrosLibres. ISBN 978-84-96088-59-7.
- Benet i Morell, Josep (1979). Cataluña bajo el régimen franquista. Barcelona, Spain: Blume. ISBN 9788470311444.
- Bowen, Wayne H. (2000). Spaniards and Nazi Germany: Collaboration in the New Order. Columbia, Missouri, United States: University of Missouri Press. ISBN 978-0826213006.
- Espadas Burgos, Manuel (1987). Franquismo y política exterior (in Spanish). Madrid, Spain: Ediciones Rialp. ISBN 84-321-2398-6.
- Christie, Stuart (2002). General Franco Made Me a "Terrorist": The Christie File: Part 2, 1964–1967. www.christiebooks.com. ISBN 1873976194.
- Ferret i Pujol, Joan Lluís (2010). L'Aviació i El Prat de Llobregat. 1936-1959 (in Catalan). Barcelona, Spain: J.L. Ferret. ISBN 9788461367696.
- García Gibert, Javier (2010). Sobre el viejo humanismo: exposición y defensa de una tradición (in Spanish). Madrid, Spain: Marcial Pons Ediciones de Historia. ISBN 978-84-92820-14-6.
- González-Doria, Fernando (1976). Memorias de un fascista español (in Spanish). Barcelona, Spain: Personas. ISBN 978-84-7326-000-8.
- Gutiérrez Alarcón, Demetrio (1978). Los toros de la guerra y del franquismo (in Spanish). Barcelona, Spain: Editorial Caralt. ISBN 84-2176772-0.
- Hidalgo Navarro, Rafael (2011). Julián Marías. Retrato de un filósofo enamorado (in Spanish). Madrid, Spain: Ediciones Rialp. ISBN 978-84-321-3846-1.
- Longerich, Peter (2012). Noakes, Jeremy; Sharpe, Lesley (eds.). Heinrich Himmler: A Life. Oxford; New York: Oxford University Press. ISBN 9780199592326.
- Martín de Pozuelo, Eduardo; Ellakuría, Iñaki (2008). La guerra ignorada: los espías españoles que combatieron a los nazis (in Spanish). Barcelona, Spain: Random House Mondadori. ISBN 978-84-8306-768-0.
- Montoliú, Pedro (2005). Madrid en la posguerra, 1939—1946: los años de la represión (in Spanish). Madrid, Spain: Sílex Ediciones. ISBN 9788477371595.
- Parker, Danny S. (2014). Hitler's Warrior: The Life and Wars of SS Colonel Jochen Peiper. Boston, Massachusetts, United States: Da Capo Press. ISBN 978-0306821547.
- Pastor i Petit, Domènec (1990). Espionaje: la Segunda Guerra Mundial y España (in Spanish). Barcelona, Spain: Plaza & Janés. ISBN 9788401230127.
- Pike, David Wingeate (2008). Franco and the Axis Stigma. London, United Kingdom: Palgrave Macmillan. ISBN 978-1-349-30089-1.
- Preston, Paul (2011). El holocausto español: Odio y exterminio en la Guerra Civil y después (in Spanish). Translated by Martínez Muñoz, Catalina; Vázquez Nacarino, Eugenia. Barcelona, Spain: Penguin Random House Grupo Editorial, Debate. ISBN 9788483068526.
- Reig Tapia, Alberto (1996). Franco "Caudillo": Mito y realidad (in Spanish). Madrid, Spain: Editorial Tecnos. ISBN 9788430928521.
- Rozenberg, Danielle (2010). La España contemporánea y la cuestión judía (in Spanish). Madrid, Spain: Marcial Pons Ediciones de Historia. ISBN 9788492820207.
- Stone, Dan (2017). Concentration Camps: A Short History. Oxford, United Kingdom: Oxford University Press. ISBN 978-0-19-879070-9.
- Thomàs, Joan Maria (2008). Roosevelt and Franco during the Second World War: from the Spanish Civil War to Pearl Harbor. New York, United States: Palgrave Macmillan. ISBN 978-0-230-60450-6.
- von Lang, Jochen (2013). Top Nazi: SS General Karl Wolff, the man between Hitler and Himmler. New York, United States: Enigma Books. ISBN 978-1-936274-52-9.
- Westemeier, Jens (2014). Himmlers Krieger: Joachim Peiper und die Waffen-SS in Krieg und Nachkriegszeit (in German). Paderborn, Germany: Verlag Ferdinand Schöningh. ISBN 978-3-506-77241-1.
