= Asturian miners' column =

Militia that fought in the Spanish Civil War

Asturian Miners Column
- Columna de mineros asturianos
- Active: 18–21 July 1936
- Country: Spanish Republic
- Allegiance: UGT-PSOE
- Type: Militia
- Role: Home defense
- Size: 3,000
- Engagements: Spanish Civil War: Siege of Oviedo

Commanders
- Commanders of the Motorized column: Francisco Martínez Dutor, Francisco Lluch Urbano
- Commanders of the Railway column: Manuel Otero, Alejandro García Menéndez
- Commanders of the Youth column: Ramón González Peña, Guzmán García

The Asturian Miners Column was a popular militia that fought for the Republicans during the Spanish Civil War in the Province of León. On the night of 18 July 1936, a special train full of miners left Asturias for Madrid, in order to defend the constitutional order. The train, after passing through León, returned to Asturias from Benavente on 21 July. A part of the mining column participated in the defense of Ponferrada.

== Organization and departure ==
In the face of the Army of Africa's uprising in the Spanish Coup of July 1936, Indalecio Prieto, a high-ranking leader of the PSOE, asked the socialist leaders of Asturias to urgently send a force of 10,000 miners to defend Madrid against the possible uprising of the local garrison. The call saw great success among the miners and after a few hours, thousands of them had gathered in Oviedo.

The civilian governor, Isidro Liarte Lausín, and the military commander, Antonio Aranda Mata, met with the representatives of the Popular Front. Aranda explained that there was no problem in the miners leaving for Madrid because there was no threat of a military rebellion in Asturias.

Through the General Union of Workers, the trucks and buses of the CAMPSA were seized to form a column that would travel by road, consisting of three trucks, four buses and a dozen cars. Two trucks were loaded with dynamite. All of these vehicles were parked in the wool field on Quintana, Pelayo and Covadonga streets, protected by Assault Guard forces. The motorized column, commanded by the socialist Francisco Martínez Dutor and the assault guard Francisco Lluch Urbano, had about 500 men. In Mieres, a large group of volunteers joined this column.

Meanwhile, a railway column composed of two locomotives and twelve wagons was organized. The train left Oviedo in the early hours of 19 July loaded with volunteers. They had 200 rifles and ammunition delivered by order of Aranda. In charge of the column were the socialist Manuel Otero and the assault guard Alejandro García Menéndez. Another large group joined Mieres, led by Ramón González Peña and the socialist youth Guzmán García.

At 5 A.M, the special train left the Ujo station, the last one in Asturias, consisting of three machines and eighteen wagons, transporting 2,500 men.

== In León ==
At 8 A.M on 19 July, the motorized column arrived in León. The miners scattered throughout the city, without causing any public order problems, and the militia officers met with the civilian governor, Emilio Francés Ortiz. The miners requested that he arm the workers with the reserves of the civil and assault guards, to which Francés flatly refused.

The Inspector General of the Army, Juan García Gómez-Caminero, was sent from Astorga by the government to take control of the garrisons of the Duero valley. Caminero and the militia officers met with Carlos Bosch Bosch, the military commander of the plaza, who refused to hand over weapons to Asturian miners without a written order from the government. Caminero telegraphed to Madrid to send the order, which was received at the León military command at lunchtime. Bosch agreed to deliver 200 rifles with 10 cartridges per weapon and three machine guns to the miners, on the condition that they leave the city.

At 10 P.M on 19 July, there was another meeting between the leaders of the Leonese unions and the civilian governor, but the latter again refused to hand over weapons to the workers, claiming that everything was under control.

Meanwhile, news came that Valladolid had fallen into the hands of the nationalists, who had installed artillery pieces on the tracks to halt the advance of the Asturian train. The command of the militia column decided to continue to Madrid through Zamora, planning to leave in trucks at 6 A.M. According to what was agreed with Bosch, the weapons were delivered to the miners, but everything was in such bad condition that Gómez-Caminero refused to sign the receipt, although he did nothing to solve the problem either. Rather, what he did was leave the city by car, managing to pass through Portugal via Puebla de Sanabria, in order to return to the republican-held area through Badajoz. The train left at 7 P.M on the Astorga-Plasencia line, stopping at Benavente for the night. The news of the existence of the train of Asturian miners spread quickly throughout Castilla la Vieja, fueling republican hopes in those first moments of uncertainty.

== Back to Asturias ==
In the early morning of 20 June, Juan Pablo García arrived in Benavente to warn the column of Antonio Aranda Mata's rebellion in Oviedo. Upon hearing the news, the unanimous opinion of the miners was to return to Asturias. The motorized column left immediately and managed to enter Asturias through Leitariegos, the first thing in the morning on 21 June, joining the first lines in the Siege of Oviedo.

The militia train, however, arrived at Ponferrada at nine in the morning. The forces of the third company of the Civil Guard were concentrated there, by order of Bosch, who had revolted after the miners had left León. The civil guards, who had been joined by some assault guards, had barricaded themselves in their barracks, located in the Plaza Mayor, overlooking the train station. The plan of the miners was to occupy the mining train station, and with that means of transportation, to reach Villablino and from there go on to Oviedo. A large number of workers from the region of Laciana and other towns of Bierzo, who had responded to the call from left-wing organizations, had also arrived in Ponferrada. However, the city's mayor, Juan García Árias, refused to give arms to the workers.

Alejandro García Menéndez from the Asturian expedition, tried to parley with the guards and managed to enter the barracks, waving a white flag. He was arrested by the rebels, who fired with machine guns at the mass of miners waiting in the plaza. The miners attacked the barracks with dynamite and rifle fire, but most of them had no weapons and withdrew to Villablino on the mining train, then went to Asturias on their own. Beginning on the evening of 20 July, the guards evicted the miners from their positions in the Plaza Mayor. Some armed miners stayed put in the Ponferrada castle, leaving their positions in the early afternoon of 21 July, after the arrival of a column of 300 men from the 30th Zaragoza Infantry Regiment, from Lugo.

Both Alejandro García Menéndez and Juan García Árias were shot by the nationalists on 29 July 1936, along with union leader Pérez Pita.

== Bibliography ==
- Álvarez Oblanca, Wenceslao; Serrano, Secundino (2010). The Civil War in León. Léon: Edilesa.
- de Blas, Juan Antonio (1986). ""The mining column heads for Madrid"". The Civil War in Asturias. Vol. I. Gijón: Júcar.
- Cabanellas, Guillermo (1975). The war of a thousand days: birth, life and death of the Second Spanish Republic. Vol. I. Buenos Aires: Heliasta.
- De Gaulle, Jacques (1973). The Northern campaign: Santander and Asturias. Círculo de Amigos de la Historia.
- Serrano, Secundino (1986). The anti-Franco guerrilla in León (1936-1951). Junta de Castilla y León.
- Thomas, Hugh (1976). History of the Spanish Civil War. Barcelona: Círculo de Lectores. ISBN 84-226-0874-X.

== See also ==
- Spanish Civil War
- Riotinto Mining Column
