= 192nd Brigade =

192nd Brigade may refer to:

- 192nd Mixed Brigade, Spain
- 192nd (2nd Gordon Highlanders) Brigade, United Kingdom
- 192nd Infantry Brigade (United States)

== See also ==
- 192nd Regiment (disambiguation)
