= Gerardo Caballero =

Spanish military officer (1890–1980)

Gerardo Caballero Olabézar
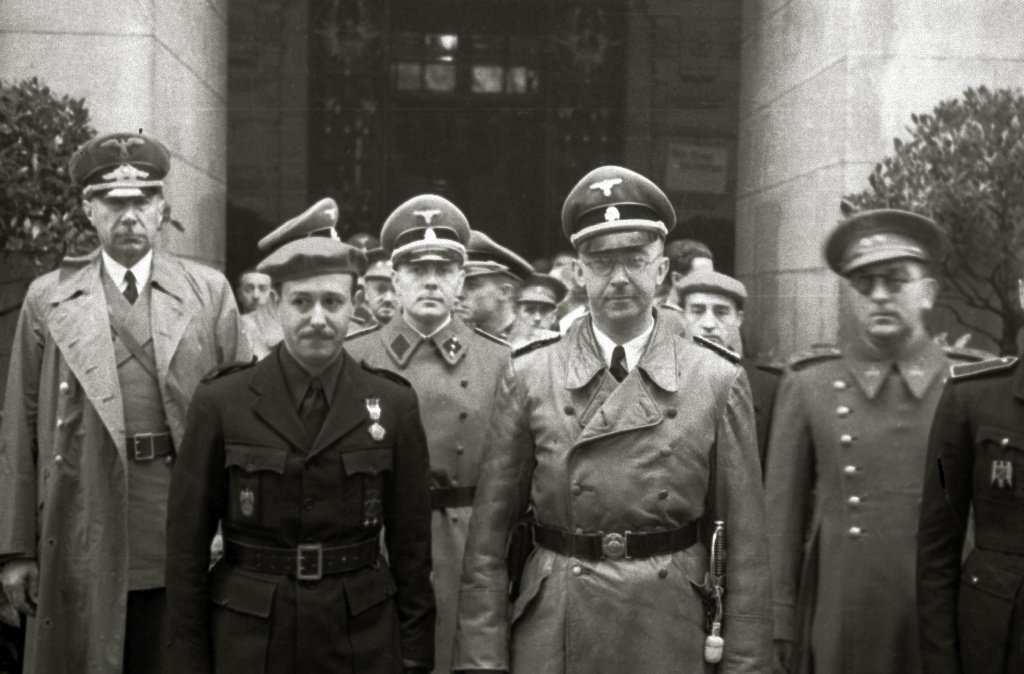
- Born: September 2, 1890; Vitoria
- Died: June 1, 1980 (aged 89); Madrid
- Military career
- Allegiance: Spain (Francoist Spain)
- Branch: Spanish Army (Army)
- Rank: Lieutenant general
- Conflicts: Asturian Revolution; Spanish Civil War
- Awards: Grand Cross of the Royal and Military Order of Saint Hermenegild (1949)
- Other work: Civil governor of Oviedo (1937–1938); Civil governor of Gipuzkoa (1939–1941); Directorate-General for Security (1941–1942); Military Governor of Biscay (1950)

Gerardo Caballero Olabézar (2 September 1890 – 1 June 1980) was a Spanish military officer. Throughout his career he held various administrative posts, such as civil governor of several provinces and Directorate-General for Security. He played a prominent role in the Francoist repression in Asturias during the Spanish Civil War.

== Biography ==
=== Military career ===
Born in Vitoria in 1890, he entered the General Military Academy in Toledo at the age of sixteen.

Months after the proclamation of the Second Republic, in August 1932, Caballero took part in the coup attempt known as the "Sanjurjada". During the Republican period he was attached to the Security and Assault Corps, commanding the 10th Assault Group. During the Asturian Revolution of 1934 he was one of the officers who led the resistance of loyalist forces in Oviedo. At that time he was in command of the first battalion of the Infantry Regiment No. 3. Subsequently, he would play a prominent role in the repression against the miners. After the electoral victory of the Popular Front, he was removed from the Assault Corps and assigned to the V Organic Division in Zaragoza.

=== Civil War and Dictatorship ===
In July 1936, involved in the military conspiracy against the government, he moved to Oviedo; there, on 19 July he placed himself under the orders of Colonel Antonio Aranda—commander of the local garrison—and joined the military uprising. His participation in the uprising was crucial for Aranda. At the head of a group of Civil Guards he managed to take over the Assault Guard barracks. Appointed delegate of Public Order after the success of the coup, Caballero directed a harsh repression in Oviedo against Left wing elements and supporters of the Republic. Under his orders, squads of Falangists operated, arresting or murdering those that the Falangists considered to be enemies. Gerardo Caballero was wounded during the Republican siege of the city, losing an eye as a result of his injuries.

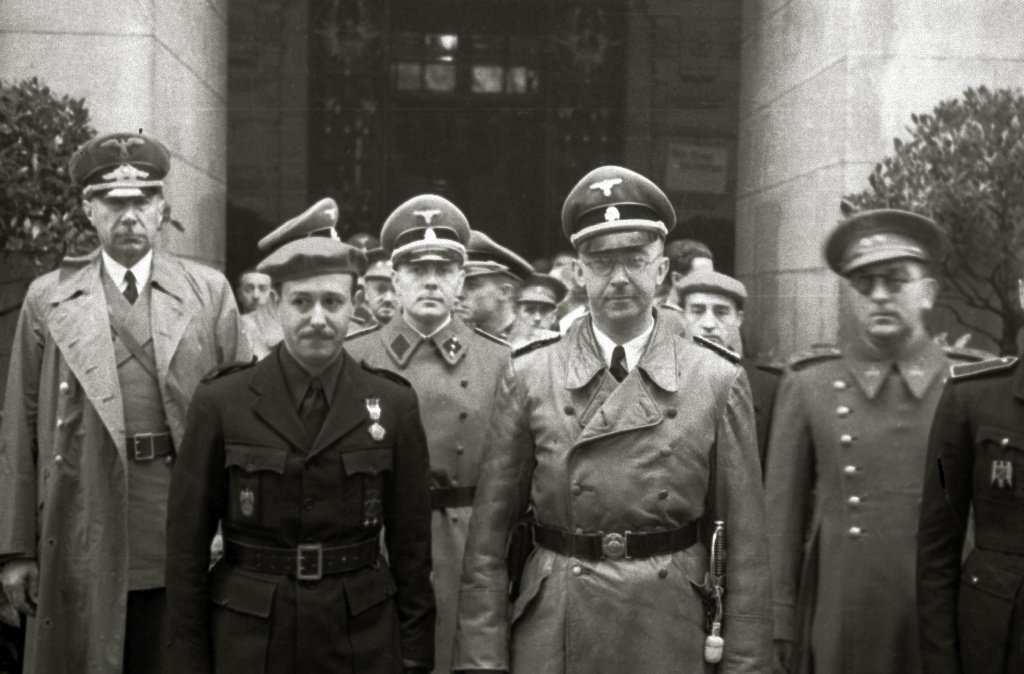
Caballero with Himmler and José Finat in San Sebastián (1940).

For some time he served as civil governor of the territory of Asturias controlled by the rebels. After the end of the war, in December 1939 he was appointed civil governor of Gipuzkoa. In October 1940 he was part of the delegation that received the Nazi leader Heinrich Himmler during his visit to Spain. While he was a civil governor of Gipuzkoa he openly supported the monarchist circles of San Sebastián, also maintaining strong tensions with the provincial chief of FET y de las JONS, Elías Querejeta Insausti. The repeated conflicts between the two led the authorities to dismiss Caballero and Querejeta from their posts and replace them with Fermín Sanz-Orrio—who assumed both positions, as they were unified into one role.

Already holding the rank of lieutenant-colonel, in 1941 he began serving with the Armed and Traffic Police forces. Later he would be appointed Directorate-General for Security, holding the post between May 1941 and June 1942, replacing the dismissed José Finat y Escrivá de Romaní. After barely a year in the post, he would be replaced by Colonel Francisco Rodríguez Martínez. He continued his military career, being promoted to the rank of brigadier general in 1948 and being appointed military governor of Biscay—as well as head of the Special Coastal Grouping—two years later. He was promoted to the rank of divisional general, equivalent to major general, in 1954, taking command of the 52nd Mountain Division. He was placed on the reservist list in 1958, reaching the rank of lieutenant-general.

== Recognitions ==
- Grand Cross of the Royal and Military Order of Saint Hermenegild (1949)

Government offices
Preceded by Unknown	Civil governor of Oviedo; 2 November 1937 – 31 August 1938	Succeeded by José Ceano Vivas-Sabau
Preceded by Francisco Rivas Jordán de Urries	Civil governor of Gipuzkoa; 10 December 1939 – 10 May 1941	Succeeded by Fermín Sanz-Orrio y Sanz
Political offices
Preceded by José Finat	Directorate-General for Security (Spain); 10 May 1941 – 29 June 1942	Succeeded by Francisco Rodríguez Martínez
