= Higinio Carrocera Mortera =

Spanish writer, historian and politician (1908–1938)

- Born: January 1908; Barros, Asturias
- Died: 8 May 1938 (aged 30); Oviedo, Asturias
- Military career
- Allegiance: CNT
- Service: Confederal militias (1936–1937), Spanish Republican Army (1937–1938)
- Service years: 1936–1938
- Units: CNT nº5 (1936–1937), 192nd Mixed Brigade (1937–1938)
- Conflicts: Spanish Civil War: Siege of Gijón; Siege of Oviedo; Battle of El Mazuco
- Awards: Medal of Freedom

Higinio Carrocera Mortera (January 1908 – 8 May 1938) was an Asturian anarcho-syndicalist who participated in the Revolution of 1934 and fought during the Spanish Civil War in Asturias.

== Biography ==
=== Youth ===
The son of a working-class couple, during his childhood he helped his family with agricultural tasks while attending the village primary school. A metalworker by profession, began working for the company Duro Felguera and at an early age he joined the CNT, the majority union among the metallurgists of La Felguera.

He actively participated in the Revolution of 1934, in which he directed a column that arrived from La Felguera in Oviedo on 6 October. With the defeat of the Revolution, he was able to escape, but was arrested in Zaragoza on 7 August 1935, together with Constantino Antuña Huerta and taken to the Oviedo Prison. After the victory of the Popular Front in the 1936 Spanish general election, he participated in a prisoner mutiny that obtained their freedom on 20 February, one day before the amnesty was promulgated.

=== Role during the Civil War ===
At the beginning of the Spanish Civil War, on 17 July, he participated in the capture of the Civil Guard barracks in La Felguera. Two days later he marched at the head of 400 anarcho-syndicalists towards Gijón, where he had a prominent role in the Siege of Gijón, participating in the taking of Simancas barracks and El Coto. After the capture of the headquarters of the "Simancas" regiment, a massacre took place, which Carrocera tried to prevent without success. Later he directed the military operations during the Siege of Oviedo and in September 1936, he was wounded in the Villafría sector, during the fight against the nationalists. Confirmed as a militia major, he became one of the main commanders of the confederal militias in Asturias. (Note: Robert J. Alexander refers to him as one of the main leaders of the anarchist militias, along with others such as Víctor Álvarez González or José Penido.) The anarcho-syndicalist author Diego Abad de Santillán described him as an "authentic hero".

Carrocera, a supporter of the militarization of the militias, came to command a battalion and took part in various military operations. In September 1937 he commanded the 192nd Mixed Brigade. At the head of this unit he fought in the Battle of El Mazuco, managing to defend a gorge against nationalist units. Thanks to this, the advance of the nationalist forces was halted for several days. At the proposal of Francisco Ciutat de Miguel, he was awarded the Medal of Freedom for his performance.

=== Capture and Execution ===
After Asturias fell into the hands of the Spanish Army, he was arrested and taken to a concentration camp in Galicia. Carrocera had refused to be evacuated by sea along with other Republican commanders. Upon being recognized, he was taken back to Asturias, where he was again confined to the Oviedo prison. The following month, on 21 February, Higinio Carrocera Mortera appeared before a council of war and was sentenced to death. He was executed by firing squad on 8 May 1938.

== Sources ==
- Alexander, Robert J. (1999). The Anarchists in the Spanish Civil War. Janus Publishing Company Lim. ISBN 978-1-85756-412-9.
- Álvarez, Ramón (1995). Rebelión militar y revolucioń en Asturias. Un protagonista libertario. Trea.
- Engel, Carlos (1999). Historia de las Brigadas Mixtas del Ejército Popular de la República. Madrid: Almena. ISBN 84-922644-7-0.
- Jiménez de Aberásturi, Luis María (2003). Crónica de la guerra en el norte (1936-1937). Txertoa.
- Muñoz Martín, Óscar (1976). Asturias en la guerra civil. Ayalga.
- Thomas, Hugh (1976). Historia de la Guerra Civil Española. Barcelona: Círculo de Lectores. ISBN 84-226-0874-X.
