= Riotinto Mining Column =

- Columna minera de Riotinto
- Active: 18 July–19 July 1936
- Country: Spanish Republic
- Allegiance: Republicans
- Type: Militia
- Role: Demolition
- Size: 250
- Garrison/HQ: Riotinto
- Engagements: Spanish Civil War: Military uprising in Seville

Commanders
- Notable commanders: Luis Cordero Bel, Juan Gutiérrez Prieto, Rafael Jurado Chacon

The Riotinto Mining Column was a grouping of volunteer fighters formed on 18 July 1936 from the Riotinto mining basins of Huelva to transport dynamite to Seville. The plan was for the miners to join a group of republican civil guards and assault guards in La Palma del Condado, so that they could enter Seville together. However, the commander of these guards betrayed his command, joined the nationalists, and on the morning of 19 July, ambushed the mining column in La Pañoleta, on the outskirts of Seville. The guards machine-gunned the miners, blowing up the dynamite, and killing and catching many of them. A military officer broadcast on the radio that they were coming to "blow up the Giralda and the cathedral".

== History ==
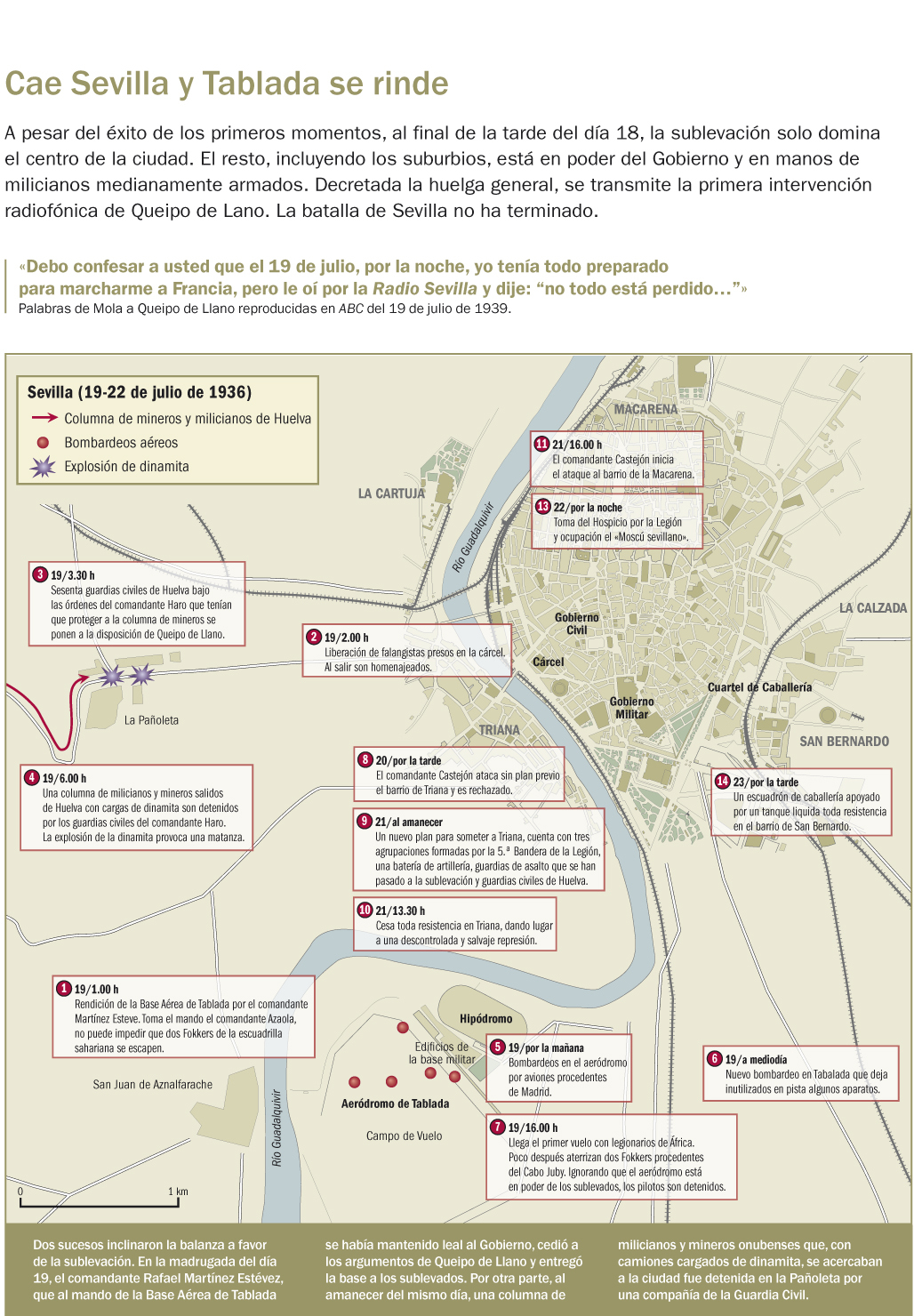
Map indicating the place near Seville where the mining column was intercepted and annihilated.

When the July 1936 military uprising in Seville took place on 18 July, fighting broke out between rebellious soldiers and those loyal to the Government. Sebastián Pozas ordered that miners with explosives, assault guards, civil guards and carabineros be sent to Seville to help put down the coup attempt.

I recommend that you mobilize the entire mining population and use explosives to annihilate these terrorist gangs, trusting the arrival of the military column that is advancing on Cordoba and Seville, in a triumphant race that in a short time will annihilate those remains of factional traitors who indulge in the crudest and most cruel vandalism in their last gasps of life

— Sebastián Pozasto the civil governor of Huelva.

The column was formed in the Huelva municipalities of Riotinto, Nerva and Calañas that same afternoon. It was made up of several hundred left-wing party and union activists, mainly miners, led by Luis Cordero Bel. Juan Gutiérrez Prieto and Rafael Jurado Chacon. Along the way they were joined by volunteers from the Huelva municipalities of Valverde del Camino and San Juan del Puerto.

Their main armament was a shipment of 250 kg of dynamite. They also had some rifles. Their means of transport was 14 trucks seized from the Rio Tinto Company, including two artisan armored vehicles, as well as some passenger cars and motorcycles.

The column undertook a route to Seville bypassing Valverde del Camino and La Palma del Condado because the plan was to join some 120 civil guards and assault guards sent from Huelva by the civil governor. But these guards had previously reached La Palma, and followed the nationalists to Seville and joining them there.

Very early on 19 July the column continued on its way to Seville. In Castilleja del Campo they seized some shotguns; then in Castilleja de la Cuesta they stopped for breakfast.

In Castilleja de la Cuesta a car passed by the column without being disturbed. In it were two Falangists, who went to the center of Seville and joined the rebels. At 10:00, the commander-in-chief of the nationalist forces in Andalusia ordered the civil guards, who had arrived from Huelva the night before, to intercept the column.

The guards drove their vehicles to Castilleja, bypassing La Algaba to avoid the barricades erected in Triana by the popular militias. Passing through Camas they stopped to liquidate the leftist resistance and put the city council into right-wing hands.

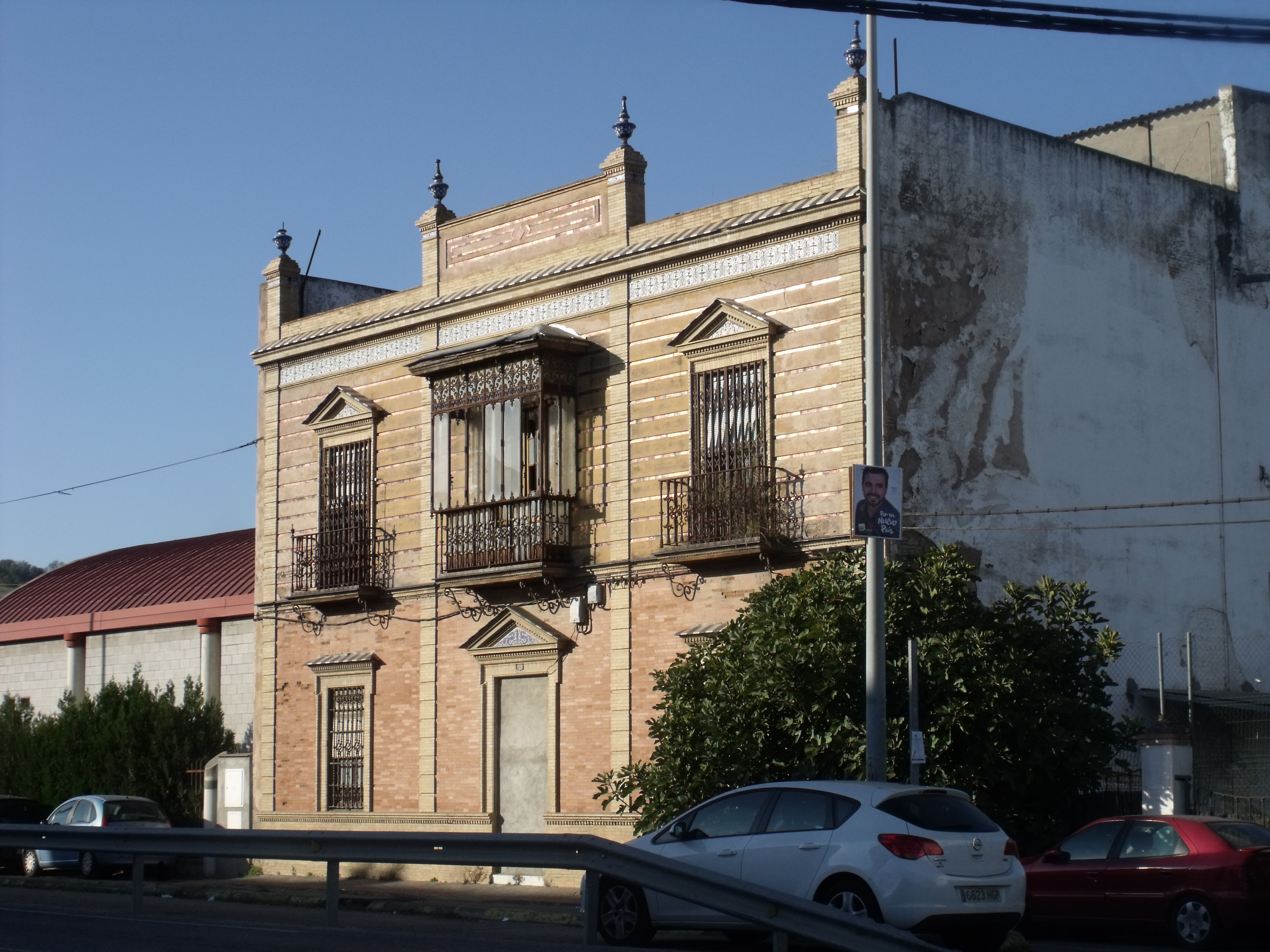
La Pañoleta, in Camas (Seville). Huelva miners were ambushed on this road.

At twelve o'clock on 19 July, when arriving at the "Cuesta del Caracol" in the neighborhood of La Pañoleta, the column fell into an ambush set up by the civil guards. A confused verbal exchange ensued, after which the guards machine-gunned the miners. One or more of the trucks loaded with dynamite exploded. 25 miners died and 71 were taken prisoner. Some trucks were able to turn around and flee while the rest of the column broke up on foot.

The captured miners were tried by the nationalists in a council of war. Three died in Seville prisons. Of the remaining 68, all but one, a minor, were sentenced to death on 29 August and shot. The Nationalist faction used the mining column episode in its propaganda, accusing the miners of having intended to "blow up Seville" or more specifically the Giralda.

In 2007 the town hall of Camas erected a monolith in memory of the Huelva mining column. In 2014 the remains of nine of the miners were found, buried in the old Camas cemetery.

== See also ==
- Spanish Coup of July 1936
- Asturian Miners Column
- Rio Tinto Company Limited
- Riotinto Railway
- Tourist Mining Train

== Bibliography ==
- Gil Honduvilla, Joaquín (2010). From the proclamation of the Republic to July 18, 1936: the change of political course in the II Organic Division (Thesis). University of Huelva (doctoral thesis).
- Hurtado, Víctor (2011). The uprising. Barcelona: DAU. ISBN 978-84-936625-6-1.
- Ortiz Villalba, Juan (2006). From the military coup to the Civil War: Seville 1936 (3 ed.). RD Editores. ISBN 8493474185.
- Salas, Nicolás (1992). Seville was the key: republic, uprising, Civil War (1931-1939). Castillejo. ISBN 8480580003.
