= Count of the Alcázar of Toledo =

Former hereditary title in the Spanish nobility

Countship of the Alcázar of Toledo
- Spanish comital coronet
- Creation date: 18 July 1948
- Created by: General Francisco Franco
- Peerage: Spain
- First holder: José Moscardó Ituarte, 1st Count
- Last holder: José Luis Moscardó y Morales-Vara del Rey, 3rd Count
- Present holder: Abolished
- Remainder to: Absolute primogeniture

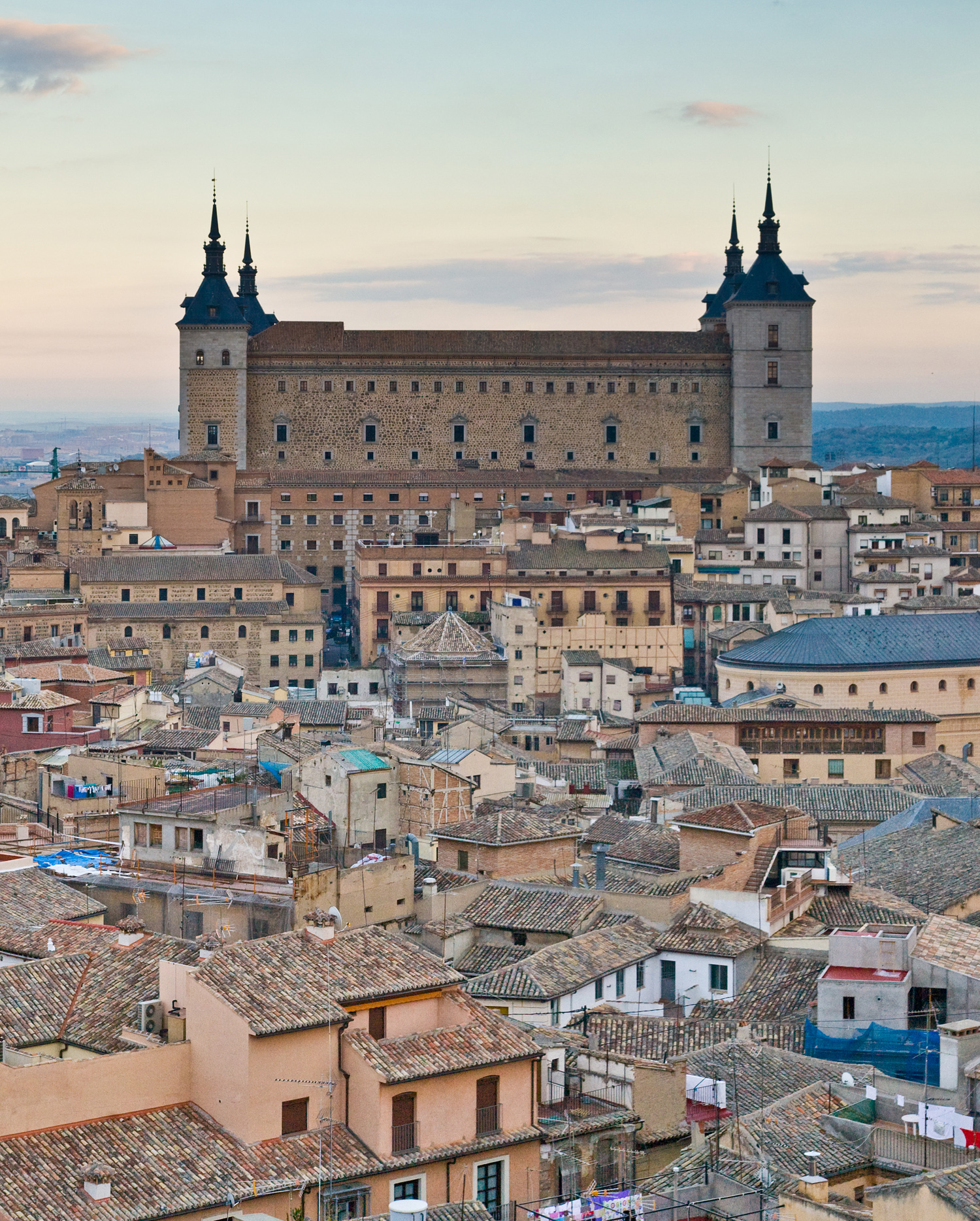
The Alcázar of Toledo

The Countship of the Alcázar of Toledo (Spanish: Condado del Alcázar de Toledo) was a hereditary title in the Spanish nobility. The dukedom was bestowed on General José Moscardó Ituarte, Commandant of the Alcázar of Toledo during the siege in the Spanish Civil War, by General Francisco Franco as head of the Spanish State.

It was abolished in October 2022, under the purview of the Law of Democratic Memory.

== Counts of the Alcázar of Toledo (1948–2022) ==
- José Moscardó Ituarte, 1st Count of the Alcázar of Toledo (1948–1956)
- Miguel Moscardó y Guzmán, 2nd Count of the Alcázar of Toledo (1957–1972)
- José Luis Moscardó y Morales-Vara del Rey, 3rd Count of the Alcázar of Toledo (1973–2022)
