= Siege of Gijón =

1936 action in the Spanish Civil War

Coordinates: 43.5333°N 5.7000°W

- Part of the Spanish Civil War
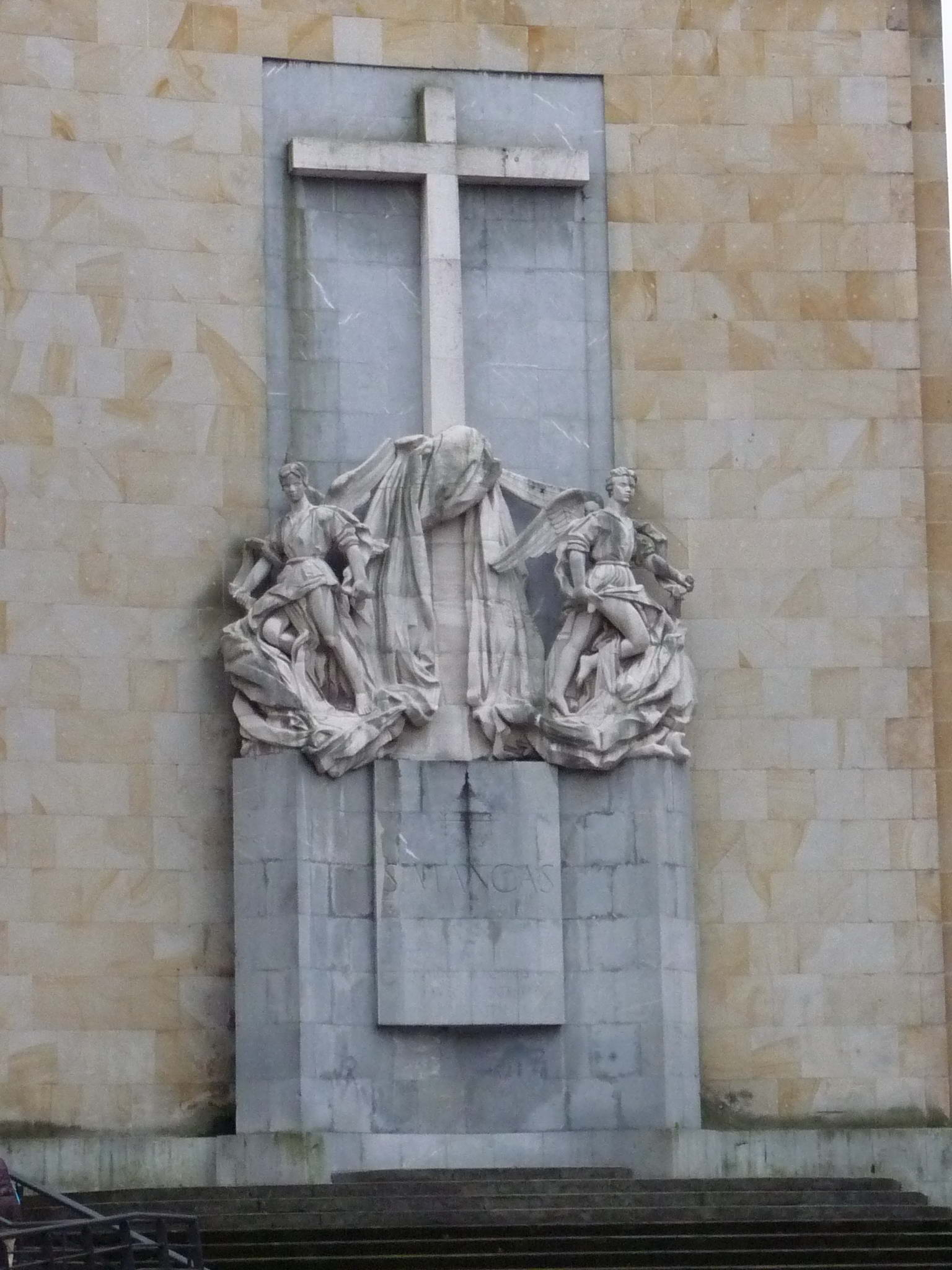
- Monument to the fallen at Simancas barracks
Date	19 July – 16 August 1936
Location	Gijón, Asturias, Spain
Result	Republican victory

Belligerents
(Spain) Spanish Republic; Antifascist Worker and Peasant Militias	(Francoist Spain) Nationalist Spain

Commanders and leaders
(Spain) Maj. José Gállego Aragüés; Manuel Otero	(Francoist Spain) Col. Antonio Pinilla †

Strength
Unknown	600 regulars & militia 1 battleship 1 destroyer

Casualties and losses
Unknown	600 killed

The siege of Gijón (Spanish: Sitio de Gijón) was a battle that occurred in Gijón, Asturias during the Spanish Civil War between 19 July and 16 August 1936. It was one of the first actions of the war.

A small garrison of Spanish Republican Army soldiers and Guardia Civil officers led by Antonio Pinilla joined the Nationalist rebels after the Spanish coup of July 1936 two days earlier. The Antifascist Worker and Peasant Militias, armed mostly with dynamite, besieged the garrison in support of the Republicans. Pinilla refused to surrender despite threats and starvation, holding off the Republican forces for just over a month until the defenders were killed in a large militia assault.

The siege in Gijón was remarkable for its viciousness and the stubbornness of the besieged.

== Background ==
The Nationalist uprising of July 1936 fared poorly in Asturias, a province that was overwhelmingly in support of the Republicans due to the strong presence of the mining industry. Asturias was controlled almost from the outset of the war by a curious but effective council of Republican state officials, technicians, and mine workers. Membership of the left-wing CNT and UGT trade unions in Asturias totalled around 70,000, forming the backbone of a disciplined militia at the disposal of the Republicans.

The Simancas Mountain Infantry Regiment No. 40 of the Spanish Republican Army, led by Colonel Antonio Pinilla Barcelón, was located at the Simancas barracks in Gijón. Pinilla, the military governor of the city, joined in the rebellion but did not openly declare his loyalty to the Nationalists due to the unfavourable situation in Asturias. Very few were fooled though, and the small garrison of around 600 men soon caught the attention of the Republicans. By late July, the Gijón garrison found itself surrounded and cut off from the Army of the North of Emilio Mola by several hundred miles of enemy territory. The Nationalist cruiser Almirante Cervera could have supported the rebel troops with her 6-inch main guns from the sea, but this offered no real hope of relief. An anarchist militia of the Antifascist Worker and Peasant Militias – mostly composed of mine workers tied to the trade unions – laid siege to the Simancas barracks in a nominal defense of the Republic.

== Siege ==
The battle for Gijón was marked by Pinilla's unwavering resistance and lack of weapons of the attackers. The Republicans could not concentrate their full numbers on the siege in Oviedo against the Nationalists until they secured Gijón's fall. Accordingly, their attacks were unrelenting against the Gijón garrison which, unlike in Oviedo, did not benefit from the element of surprise. The Republicans were able to prepare and arm some loyalists beforehand, allowing them to besiege Pinilla's men with greater success than Oviedo. The militia of mine workers had few small arms but had access to large quantities of dynamite. The Nationalists had some advantage as they were able to easily repel waves of attacks from 22 to 24 July, causing heavy casualties for the Republicans. Anarchists at the concurrent siege of the Alcázar in Toledo had captured Pinilla's son and threatened to execute him if the defenders refused to surrender. Pinilla, like his counterpart José Moscardó Ituarte in Toledo, was unmoved. The militia dug an underground tunnel beneath the barracks, but the rebels discovered it and were able to fend them off.

By August, fortunes were turning against Pinilla and his men as the Simancas barracks was not designed for a prolonged siege. It had been damaged by a month of dynamite attacks and Republican Air Force bombing raids, and the defenders soon ran out of water and food. However, Pinilla refused to give in, believing from the distorted reports of Nationalist propaganda that relief was imminent. In mid-August, the militia stormed the barracks (hurling dynamite as they charged) causing the garrison's exhausted defence to crumble. Pinilla, rather than surrender, sent a radio message to the Almirante Cervera ordering it to open fire on his position, which was obeyed. The last defenders of Simancas barracks died in the flames, the bombardment, or were executed by the Republicans.

== Aftermath ==
The entire Nationalist garrison in Gijón of around 600 men was wiped out in the siege, which had lasted just over a month. The Republicans were able to concentrate their efforts back to Oviedo. However, the events in Gijón had relieved pressure on the rebel garrison in Oviedo, a distraction which allowed it to hold out for longer. On 18 October, Nationalist troops from Galicia entered Oviedo and were able to break the siege there. Gijón proved to be a Republican stronghold and their last bastion on the Cantabrian Sea until the city was taken by the Nationalists a year later on 21 October 1937.

== See also ==
- List of Spanish Republican military equipment of the Spanish Civil War
- List of Spanish Nationalist military equipment of the Spanish Civil War
