= Checa (Spanish Civil War) =

Secret police during the 1936 Spanish Revolution

The checas were unofficial parapolice units which committed arbitrary arrests and detentions, torture, unfair trials and executions, as part of the Red Terror during the Spanish Civil War. The term "checa" was first used by anarcho-syndicalists to denounce prisoner abuse, but was later adopted by the Francoist dictatorship to describe the Provincial Committee of Public Inquiry (CPIP), a parapolice agency established by the Republicans during the early months of the war.

== Etymology and orthography ==
The checas were named after the All-Russian Extraordinary Commission (VChK), commonly known as the cheka, the Bolshevik secret police which carried out the Red Terror during the Russian Civil War. The hispanicised term "checa" later gained use to refer in kind to the parapolice units who carried out the Red Terror during the Spanish Civil War. Although revolutionary tribunals established in Madrid in 1936 were not deliberately modelled on the Russian chekas, and notably differed in their methods of execution, the two both carried out arbitrary arrests and detentions, torture and unfair trials.

During the terror, the term "checa" was rarely used by Republicans themselves. It first came into use in the spring of 1937, when anarcho-syndicalists used the term to denounce the conduct of José Cazorla, the police chief of the Madrid Defence Council. After the arrest of CNT member Antonio Verardini, the anarchist newspaper Castilla Libre proclaimed that Cazorla had brought Madrid under the terror of a criminal gang, which it referred to as a checa. In May 1937, as reports about the mistreatment of prisoners surfaced, the Madrid branch of the CNT denounced the "Atocha checa", while the new justice minister Manuel de Irujo pledged to put a stop to prisoner abuse.

The term "checa" later gained use among the victorious Nationalist faction and its secret police. The Causa General generally labelled socialist circles within the CPIP as "checas". It described a police station in Buenavista as a "checa", due to the killings that took place there in the winter of 1936 and 1937, while it was under the control of former members of the dissolved CPIP. It also labelled a police squad led by socialist party member David Vázquez Valdovinos as the "Fuencarral checa", although there was no evidence it carried out executions. In 1943, the Causa General claimed to have identified at least 226 checas who had participated in the Red Terror in Madrid. The term later gained use by right-wing revisionist historians such as César Vidal, who used it to portray organised state terrorism following the model of Stalinism.

== History ==
In the days that followed the outbreak of the Spanish Civil War, various left-wing political parties in Madrid established their own private police units, which came to be known as checas, to identify and kill suspected fascists. Although they sometimes consulted with each other, these checas were largely independent, responsible only to their own party. They established kangaroo courts to sentence accused fascists to the death penalty, which would be carried out by "special brigades" of ex-criminals. They used the euphemism "dar un paseo" (English: to go for a ride) to refer to their execution. With permission from the Madrid authorities, the socialist Agapito García Atadell established his own "brigade of criminal investigation" in Castellana and used the archives of the Ministry of the Interior to track down right-wing party members. Most of those who the checas killed were rank-and-file party members, while party leaders themselves were imprisoned.

Public order was eventually restored in the Republican zone, with the Provincial Committee of Public Inquiry (CPIP) being dissolved in November 1936. Santiago Carrillo said his first act as the head of public order on the Madrid Defence Council was to "get rid of those they later called the checas", which he himself called "parallel police". Some checa organisers later took positions of authority within the official Republican police force.

== Bibliography ==
- Preston, Paul (2012). The Spanish Holocaust. HarperPress. ISBN 978-0-393-06476-6.
- Ruiz, Julius (2014) [2012]. The 'Red Terror' and the Spanish Civil War: Revolutionary Violence in Madrid. Cambridge University Press. ISBN 978-1-107-05454-7.
- Thomas, Hugh (2001) [1961]. The Spanish Civil War (Revised ed.). Modern Library. ISBN 0-375-75515-2.
