= Francisco Franco Salgado-Araújo =

Spanish military personnel (1890–1975)

Francisco Franco Salgado-Araujo
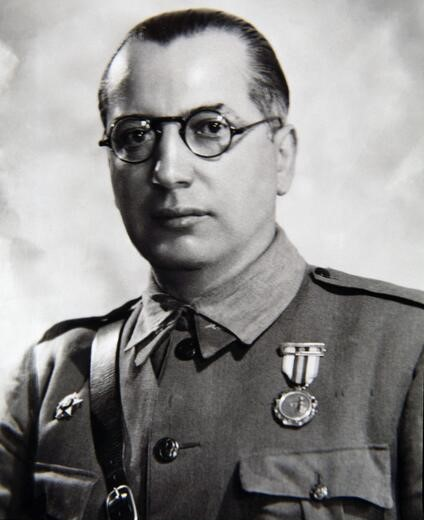
- Born: July 16, 1890; Ferrol, Spain
- Died: May 1, 1975 (aged 84); Madrid, Spain
- Military career
- Allegiance: Kingdom of Spain; Spanish Republic; Rebellion faction Franco dictatorship
- Branch: Army
- Rank: Lieutenant General
- Wars: Rif War

Francisco Franco Salgado-Araujo, known familiarly as Pacón (July 16, 1890 – May 1, 1975), was a Spanish military officer, first cousin and collaborator of the Spanish dictator Francisco Franco Bahamonde. During the Spanish Civil War and the subsequent Franco dictatorship he remained at his cousin's side, being recognized as one of his closest collaborators on a personal level.

== Military career and personal life ==
In 1908, Franco Salgado-Araujo entered the Toledo Infantry Academy whose colonel director was José Villalba Riquelme, and in 1912, a year after being named Second Lieutenant, he was sent to the Spanish Morocco, where he participated in the Rif War. Salgado-Araujo quickly became known for his affinity with his cousin, Francisco Franco, which made him a faithful collaborator in the field. He would collaborate especially with him during the preparation of the July 1936 coup d'état. In fact, he would accompany him during the flight from Las Palmas de Gran Canaria to Tetouan aboard the Dragon Rapide. During the Spanish Civil War he continued at his side, especially when Franco became Head of State and leader of the rebel side, and after the establishment of the Franco dictatorship he was appointed second in command of the Military Household of Francisco Franco. Finally, in 1954 he became head of Franco's Military Household, a position he would leave on August 7, 1956, when he was replaced by General Antonio Barroso Sánchez-Guerra. In the military field, in 1945 he was promoted to Major General and rewarded with the Grand Cross of the Order of San Hermenegildo. In April 1950 he was appointed Commander-in-Chief of the 11th Division, garrisoned in Madrid, a position he would hold for almost three years until he was promoted to the rank of Lieutenant General and appointed Captain General of the V Military Region (Zaragoza) and in turn of the Army Corps of Aragon V.

He was married twice, first to María Luisa Revilla Vidal and the second to María del Pilar de la Rocha Nogués. After his death, two posthumous works were published: "My Private Conversations with Franco" (1976) and "My Life with Franco" (1977). For historian Ricardo de la Cierva, "the conversations between the two Franco cousins are authentic and true, since Franco Salgado's many virtues do not include a great imagination." Regarding Private Conversations with Franco, De la Cierva points out that Franco Salgado-Araujo wrote this work out of deep resentment toward his cousin and provided numerous details about the business dealings of all those who belonged to Franco's circle. His comments about Franco's wife, Carmen Polo, also reveal a strong personal conflict:

"...there are days when she can't even stand herself. She adopts an air of severity and absurd poise..."

— Franco Salgado-Araujo (1954)

Salgado-Araujo's work provided historians with new data and a new perspective for their study of Franco. An example of this is pointed out by Paul Preston, with the case of the Bombings of Barcelona in March 1938: These had been ordered directly by Benito Mussolini, although Franco said at the time that they had occurred without his knowledge. In this regard, Salgado-Araujo indicated that in 1967 Franco had told him that "all bombings were always carried out by special decision of the Spanish command." In other passages, Salgado-Araujo commented on the Franco family's business dealings and the "caudillo" himself:

“I don't like that H.E. [His Excellency] is at the head of a Sociedad Anónima because of his position. I think it would have been better if he had bought all the shares and registered the property in his name, as that would be serious, and even more so when everyone knows that the property belongs to H.E. and that Sanchiz is there as a collaborator or manager...”

— Franco Salgado-Araujo, August 19, 1955

== Awards ==
- Mehdauía Order (1939).
- Grand Officer of the Order of the Crown of Italy (1939).
- Grand Cross of the Order of Naval Merit (1945).
- Knight Grand Cross of the Order of San Hermenegildo (1945).
