= Cándido Cartón =

Spanish executioner

Executioner of Audiencia de Sevilla
- In office 1936–1939
- Succeeded by: Bartolomé Casanueva Ramírez

Executioner of Audiencia Nacional
- In office 1940–1949

Personal details
- Born: Madrid, Spain
- Died: 1970 Buenos Aires, Argentina
- Occupation: Executioner

Cándido Cartón (d. Buenos Aires, 1970) was a Spanish executioner of the Audiencia de Sevilla (1936–39) and Audiencia Nacional (1940-49).

He fought in the Spanish Civil War with the Spanish Armed Forces in Francoist Spain.

When the war ended, he lost his family and asked to be reinstated as executioner until 1950, when he resigned and emigrated to Buenos Aires, where he died in 1970.

== Accused people executed by Cándido Cartón ==
- Manuel Gallego Fernández (Sevilla, 8 March 1937)
- Manuel González Rubio (Sevilla, 10 March 1937)
- José Galán Bernal (Sevilla, 11 October 1937)
- José Muñoz Mesa (Sevilla, 5 February 1938)
- Ana París García (Sevilla, 5 February 1938)
- Miguel Sánchez Torres (Sevilla, 5 February 1938)
- Miguel Ortega Fernández (Sevilla, 5 February 1938)
- Antonio Pérez Cabeza (Sevilla, 7 March 1938)
- Carmelo Iglesias Muñoz (Madrid, 9 December 1941)
