= Siege of Oviedo =

Siege during the Spanish Civil War

Coordinates: 43°21′36″N 5°50′42″W

- Part of the Spanish Civil War
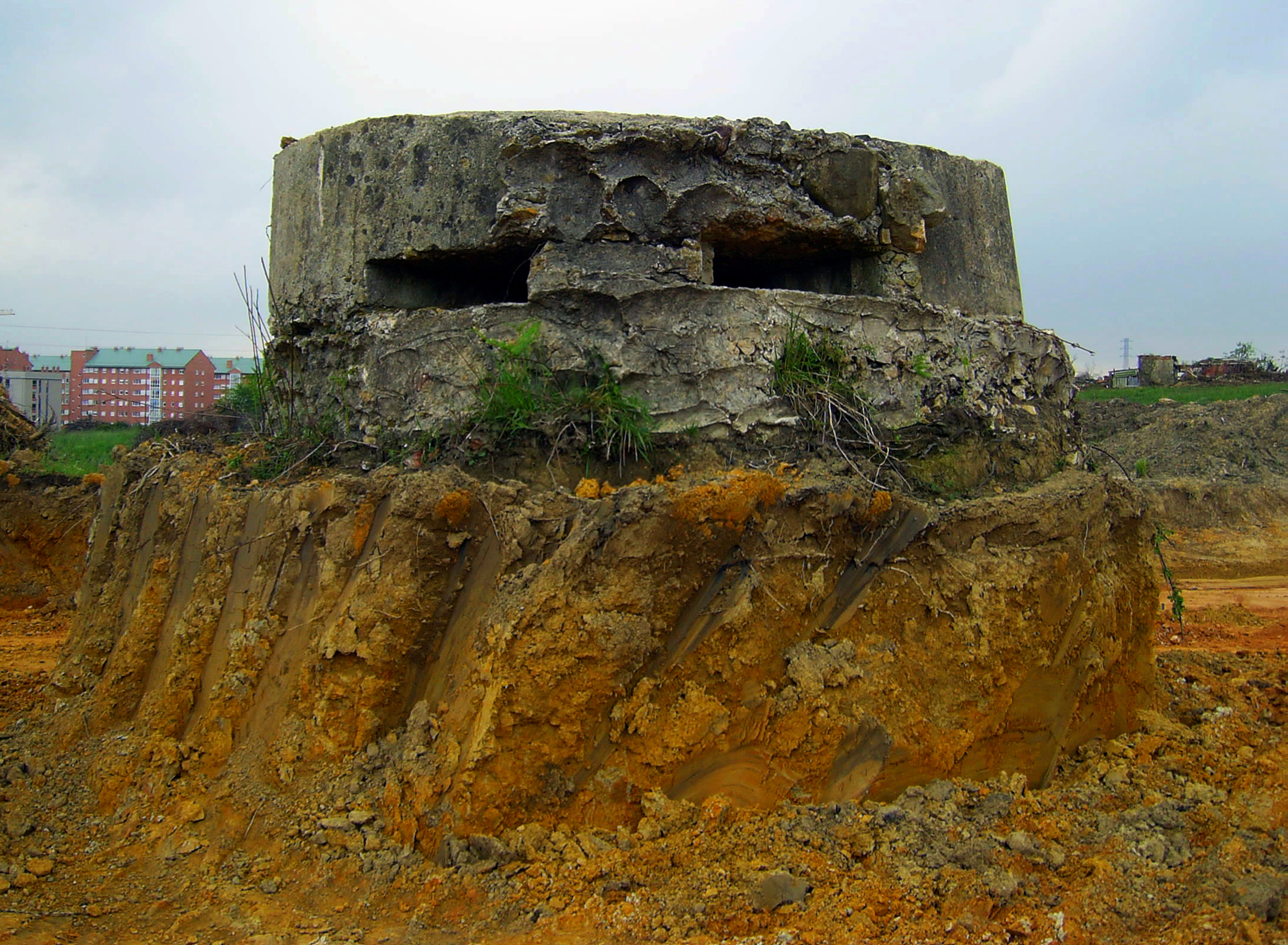
- A bunker at the outskirts of Oviedo
Date	19 July – 16 October 1936
Location	Oviedo, Asturias, Spain
Result	Nationalist victory: Siege lifted

Belligerents
(Spain) Second Spanish Republic; Antifascist Worker and Peasant Militias; Confederal militias	(Francoist Spain) Nationalist Spain

Commanders and leaders
(Spain) Col. José Franco Mussió (Spain) Lt. Col. Alfonso Ros Hernández (executed) (Spain) Lt. Col. Javier Linares Aranzabe; Francisco Martínez Dutor; Higinio Carrocera	Col. Antonio Aranda; Col. Eduardo Recas; Lt. Col. Carlos Lapresa Rodríguez; Lt. Col. Gerardo Caballero (WIA)

Strength
10,000; 1 light tank 1 armoured tractor	3,000; 3 light tanks

Casualties and losses
5,000; 1 light tank 1 armoured tractor	2,500; 1 light tank

The siege of Oviedo was a siege in the Spanish Civil War that lasted from 19 July until 16 October 1936. The town garrison, under the command of Colonel Antonio Aranda Mata, took sides for the Nationalist uprising and held out until relieved by a Nationalist force from Galicia.

== The uprising ==
The Nationalists did not consider Oviedo, capital of the province of Asturias, as a likely place for a successful revolt, and initially, it was considered a lost cause for the uprising. The town was the center of the Asturian October Revolution of 1934, and became an ongoing hive of revolutionary activity since the election of the Popular Front government earlier in the year.

Aranda was reputed to be a freemason and a Republican, and got along well with the local Republican officials; in addition, the Falange distrusted him. Aranda declared that he would be loyal to the Republic when the rebellion started on 17 July, and he convinced the civil governor and the union leaders that all was calm. So satisfied were the authorities that 4,000 miners left by train for other parts of Asturias and Spain to fight in the growing conflict. Aranda secretly called in Civil Guard and Assault Guard personnel from all Asturias to concentrate at Oviedo. He had gained a reputation in Africa of being a top strategist, and after the miners left, he declared for the rebellion on 19 July. The Falange, Civil Guard, and Assault Guard immediately rallied to his side. Aranda easily took over Oviedo as the republicans panicked, and the rest of Asturias became hostile toward him. Between the two large zones, east and west of Oviedo, Aranda was landlocked and surrounded in the town.

== Aranda's plan ==
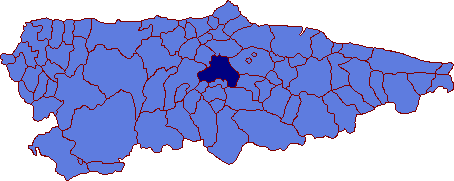
The map shows the province of Asturias. Oviedo is the dark area in the center.

Aranda realised from the beginning that he would have to hold the town and had made intelligent and extensive preparations in the process. He had carefully studied the defense of the place, and having at first much equipment from the barracks in Oviedo, he sited over 100 Hotchkiss machine guns in five strategic locations in about a nine-mile perimeter around the town. The town was not that easy to defend as it was surrounded on all sides by heights, but Aranda took that into consideration and secured the heights in preparation of laying down curtains of fire against the invaders. Aranda's tactics were novel for the time as they considered that a town as vulnerable as Oviedo could be held by firepower alone. Aranda's plan did have one serious flaw as he only had about 3,000 defenders, counting regular forces, guards, and volunteers. That meant he could not occupy all of the heights, and this gave the attackers their one main advantage. The Republican government in Madrid had reinforced the garrison at Oviedo after the 1934 revolution and had sent large numbers of guns and amounts of ammunition for storage there. In addition to the large number of machine guns, Aranda had over a million rounds of ammunition at his disposal. During a relatively quiet time in August, Aranda improved his position by constant offensive thrusts and feints that kept the besiegers in doubt.

== The siege begins ==
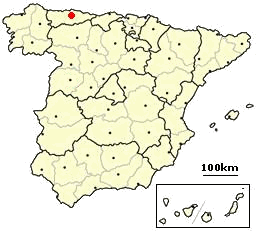
The map shows location of Oviedo in relation to the rest of Spain.

Since the siege had no regular Republican ground forces, their "army" consisted almost solely of militia from the Popular Front parties and the allied Anarchists, and they began besieging Oviedo on 20 July but at the same time had to conduct the Siege of Gijón, also in Asturias. The Nationalists at Gijón's Simancas Barracks held out until 16 August. Thereafter, the Popular Front forces could start to concentrate on Oviedo. The final Nationalist resistance ended in Gijón on 21 August, and the Republican Gijón militia could now join the siege of Oviedo. The fact was, however, that about two hundred defenders had tied down the entire militia of that area for a month. Valuable time had been gained by the Nationalists and lost by the Republicans.

After the end of the conflict in Gijón, the Popular Front forces were able to tighten the siege at Oviedo. Most of the attacking militia were miners from the many Asturian mines. The besieging force, though, had several problems; it lacked professionalism with few, if any, trained military men as almost all such troops, including a majority of the Assault Guards, had rallied to the uprising. In addition, a Nationalist relief force was on the way from Galicia, and the siege in Gijón had drained away forces needed to oppose that advance. The relief force had made substantial progress towards Oviedo, and the Popular Front forces had little proper equipment to conduct a siege with the exception of dynamite. Last, but not least, was the terrain. With the seizure of the heights around Oviedo, Aranda was confident that the town was well prepared for defense.

== The attackers tighten the siege ==
Two union members, Otero, a socialist miner, and Higinio Carrocera, an anarchist steelworker, assumed leadership of the siege. The attackers had cut off the water supply from the outset. The defenders, however, made the city reservoir one of their defended strong points, and with rationing were able to endure the siege. Despite their efforts, however, water could not be used for sanitation. Oviedo was known as a warehouse center for all Asturias, and so the garrison and populace had plenty of food at first. Little fighting occurred until 4 September, when the attackers launched a ferocious aerial and artillery bombardment. An estimated 1,500 bombs were dropped on Oviedo, cutting off the gas, electric, and telephone systems, causing a total blackout of the town. Four days later, supported by an improvised armor-plated steamroller and aerial support, the attackers tried to take the most remote outpost. The defenders reacted by raising several artillery pieces on sandbags to act as anti-aircraft guns. The Nationalist troops were also supported by three Trubia A-4 tanks from the Infantry Regiment Milán. The Trubia was basically a Spanish version of the Renault FT. After a 12-hour battle, the attackers were driven off.

The heavy shelling had killed a large number of civilians, but more died due to the lack of water for sanitation. Many people who were sympathetic to the Popular Front joined the forces defending Oviedo because a family member was killed or injured by the attackers' explosives. There was a constant danger of in-town fighting between those loyal to the Republic and the defenders of the siege, but those fears quickly evaporated as the attackers intensified the bombardment and caused more civilian casualties. One advantage to the defenders was that a large portion of the population was politically neutral. A bomb from a Popular Front airstrike killed at least 120 civilians, most of them children and the elderly, on 10 September.

The attackers tightened the siege even further as September wore on. Because of the lack of water for sanitation, typhoid broke out and claimed many lives, especially the physically weak, the old, and the very young. As an aside, Oviedo was remarkable during the siege in that the defenders executed none of the political prisoners whom they held in captivity, which was unique at this time on both sides early in the war.

== The final assault begins ==
On 4 October, the day before the second anniversary of the beginning of the Asturias Revolution of 1934, Popular Front militias launched a massive assault on the city. The attackers were in a hurry since units from the tough Army of Africa had reinforced the Nationalist relief column from Galicia. Although the Popular Front had held up that relief column for two weeks, it was only 15 miles from Oviedo. Aranda had lost half of his defenders, and the attackers rolled over one of his defense points as he lost part of the high ground around the town. The Republicans used Renault FT17 tanks and several armoured fighting vehicles, while the Nationalists defended the main routes to the city with their three Trubia tanks. One of them was blown up by its crew after developing mechanical troubles at Argañosa. Conversely, the attackers lost a number of armoured vehicles to 75 mm guns and armour-piercing ammunition from machine guns and rifles. The fighting raged for a week and, one by one, the defenders' strong points fell to the attackers. Aranda abandoned what was left of the perimeter and pulled his survivors back into the town, and by that time he had used 90% of his ammunition. The defenders ran out of machine gun ammunition and the fighting reverted to hand to hand combat. The attackers fought from house to house by cutting holes in the walls joining the houses. The defenders were almost out of ammunition when several Nationalist airmen managed to drop 30,000 rounds to them.

== Aranda's last stand ==
Aranda had only 500 defenders left and he pulled them into the center of the town for a last stand. By that time, the Popular Front militia captured Oviedo's last power plant, leaving the entire town powerless. Aranda retreated into the barracks in the middle of the defense, and with a radio powered by a car battery, he exhorted the defenders to "fight like Spaniards to the end". He sent a message to the Nationalist relief column from Galicia to state that his troops were out of ammunition, but that they would fight to the last. The Popular Front militias had suffered enormous losses themselves, estimated at least 5,000 casualties; they were low on ammunition but were making slow progress. Then, on 16 October, with the defenders facing annihilation, the Galician relief column arrived and the Popular Front militias, almost out of ammunition, halted their assault.

== Relief and end of siege ==
The Nationalists won a narrow corridor into the city and held it until the end of the War in the North a year later. The Popular Front militias abandoned the town and retreated to their positions occupied at the start of the siege. Oviedo, however, was no longer in danger.

From 25 to 27 October there were further actions in the outskirts of the city, in places like San Claudio and Naranco, in a successful nationalist attempt to widen the corridor. Both sides employed armoured fighting vehicles and light tanks, like the Nationalist Trubia or the Republican Renault FT17. In a sweep across Naranco, a nationalist Trubia tank captured a disabled Landesa armed tractor, left in no-man land since breaking down on 10 September. The last significant Republican offensives of 1936 on Oviedo occurred on 27 November, 1 December and 10 December, all of them supported by BA-3/6 armoured cars. Little or no ground was gained, at the cost of at least two armoured vehicles.

The final all-out offensive of the Republican army on Oviedo took place on 21 February 1937, when a mechanized force of four T-26 tanks, ten Renault FTs, a few Landesa tractors and Trubia Naval tanks, supported by a number of armoured trucks, attempted to break through the rebel lines. The Nationalists deployed their Trubia A4s and the captured Landesa tractor, by then worn down after months of heavy service, in defensive positions guarding the main approaches to the inner city. They were supported by Ferrol armoured vehicles from the Galician relief column. The nationalist tanks launched a successful counter-attack in the Postigo area the first day of the government's forces assault, which was contained by 27 February. The Republican lost two tanks at San Claudio, three others at San Lazaro on the 28 and other three at Los Catalanes by the beginning of March. Aranda would continue to serve the Nationalist cause including the Battle of Teruel and other actions during the war.

== See also ==
- List of Spanish Nationalist military equipment of the Spanish Civil War
- List of Spanish Republican military equipment of the Spanish Civil War
