= Antonio Aranda =

Spanish military officer (1888–1979)

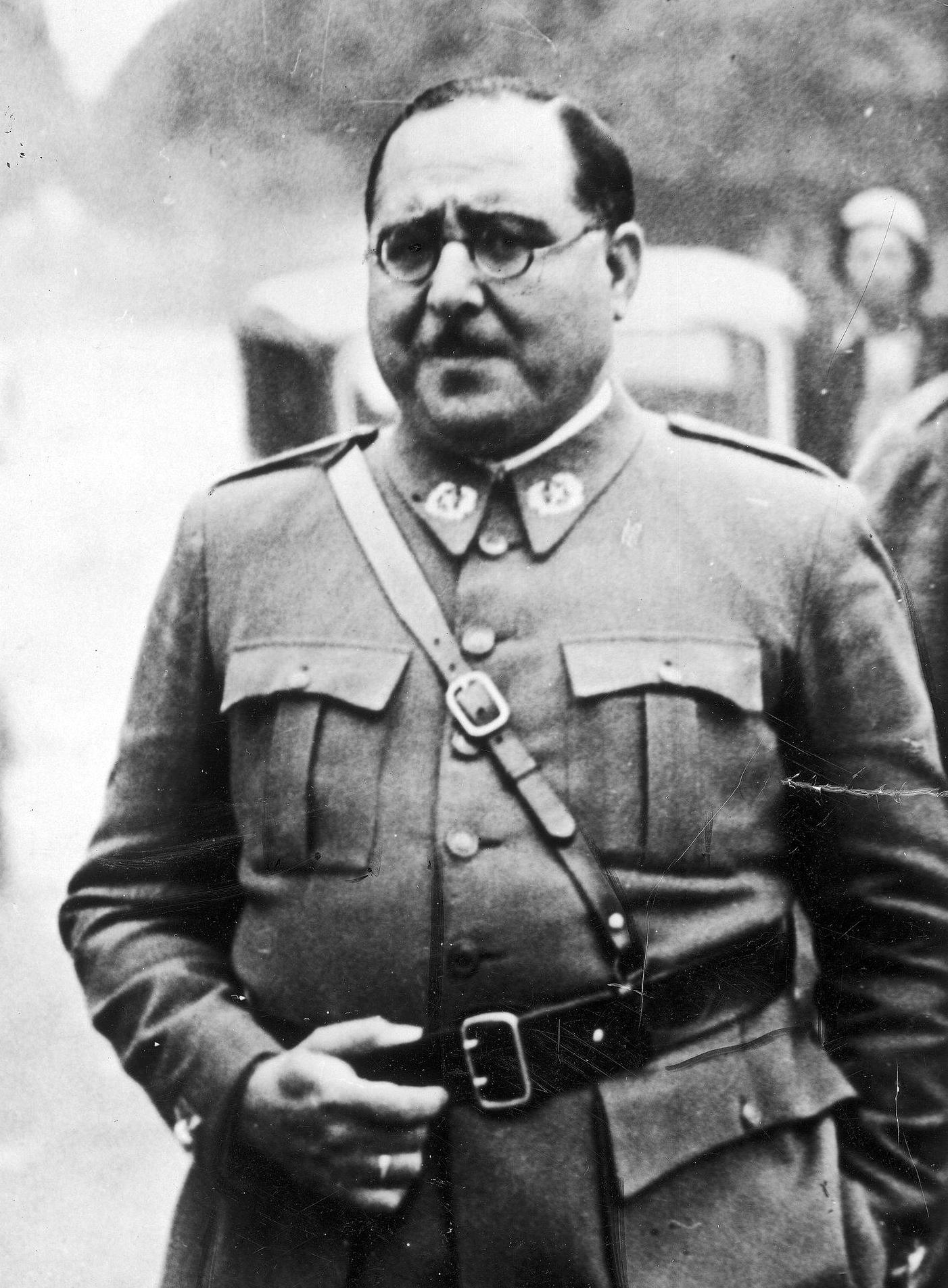
- Born: 13 November 1888; Leganés, Spain
- Died: 8 February 1979 (aged 90); Madrid, Spain
- Military career
- Rank: Lieutenant General
- Conflicts: Rif War; Spanish Civil War: Siege of Oviedo; Battle of Teruel; Battle of the Ebro

Antonio Aranda Mata (13 November 1888 – 8 February 1979) was a military officer who fought on the Nationalist faction in the Spanish Civil War.

== Biography ==
Antonio Aranda Mata was born in Leganés on 13 November 1888. During the Morocco wars Aranda earned an outstanding record as an engineer and geographer. He participated in the quelling of the 1934 Asturian revolt and rose to the rank of colonel. At the beginning of the Spanish Civil War, in 1936, he was in command of the Oviedo garrison, which joined the coup d'état against the Republic and quickly took control of the city for the Rebel faction. Aranda then successfully defended Oviedo from "miners' militias". For his efforts he was awarded the Cross of San Fernando and promoted to the rank of General. Aranda participated in several further engagements during the war including the Battle of Teruel and the Battle of the Ebro. He served as captain general of the military region of Valencia.

Immediately following the war Aranda was appointed as the head of the Royal Geographical Society. In 1941 he participated in several clandestine actions in favor of the monarchy that resulted in irritating the government of Francisco Franco. He was one of a group of pro-British monarchist generals to secretly receive money from British Intelligence MI-6. He was briefly imprisoned in 1947 for two months. In 1949, Aranda, then a division general, was retired from duty by Franco. Reasons argued by commentators for the cessation include the liberal ideology reportedly espoused by Aranda, his protracted lobbying and conspiring in favour of the installment of a constitutional monarchy (headed by Juan of Bourbon), or, rather anecdotically, an alleged link to freemasonry.

According to Francisco Franco Salgado-Araújo, the latter's cousin Francisco Franco was convinced that Aranda was a freemason.

In 1976, after Franco's death, Juan Carlos I promoted Aranda to the rank of Lieutenant General.

He died in the Hospital del Generalísimo on 8 February 1979.
