= 192nd Mixed Brigade =

- 192.ª Brigada Mixta
- Active: April 1938–March 1939
- Country: Spain
- Allegiance: (Second Spanish Republic) Republican faction
- Branch: Spanish Republican Army
- Type: Infantry
- Size: Brigade
- Engagements: Spanish Civil War

Commanders
- Notable commanders: Abelardo Belenguer Alcober

The 192nd Mixed Brigade was a unit of the Spanish Republican Army created during the Spanish Civil War. Deployed on the Extremadura front, the unit played a minor role during the war.

== History ==
The unit was created on April 30, 1938, from reservists from 1925 and 1926. Previously, an Asturian brigade had used this numbering in the north. (Note: The unit, former 5th Asturian Brigade, became attached to the 60th Division and operated on the Asturias front. The captain of the engineers Indalecio Martínez Viejo, the captain of the carabineros Ignacio Cerezo Pérez and the militia major Higinio Carrocera passed through the command of the brigade. Under the command of Hignio Carrocera, the brigade had an outstanding performance during the Battle of El Mazuco, in September 1937, managing to delay the nationalist advance towards Asturias for several days.) The new 192nd Mixed Brigade, which was initially part of the 53rd Division of XVII Army Corps, would later be added to the 29th Division of the VI Army Corps. Command was passed to the militia major Abelardo Belenguer Alcober.

The organization of the unit was long delayed and it was not until July that it was complete. In November 1938, the 192nd Mixed Brigade was assigned to the 68th Division. Its garrison was in the Santa Quiteria Mines. It didn't participate in the Battle of Peñarroya, in January 1939, due to its weak organization.

== Command ==
Commanders

- Militia major Abelardo Belenguer Alcober;

== Bibliography ==
- Engel, Carlos (1999). Historia de las Brigadas Mixtas del Ejército Popular de la República (in Spanish). Madrid: Almena. ISBN 84-922644-7-0.
- Martínez Bande, José Manuel (1981). La batalla de Pozoblanco y el cierre de la bolsa de Mérida (in Spanish). Madrid: Editorial San Martín.
- Muñoz Martín, Óscar (1976). Asturias en la guerra civil (in Spanish). Ayalga.
