= Directorate-General for Security (Spain) =

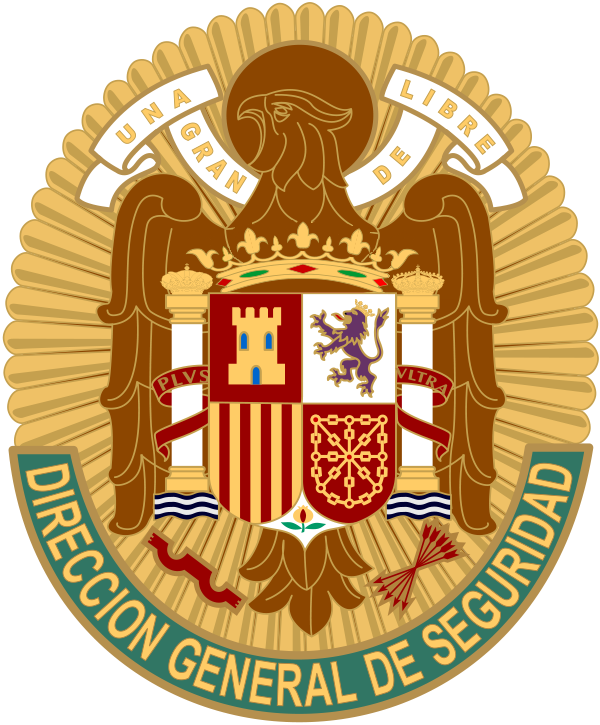
Emblem of the General Police Corps (1942).

The Directorate-General for Security (Spanish: Dirección General de Seguridad, DGS) was a Spanish agency under the Ministry of the Interior responsible for public order policy throughout Spain.

First created in March 1858 as Directorate-General for Security and Public Order, it was dissolved in October that year. It was re-established in 1886 as Directorate-General for Security and again disbanded in 1888. Finally, the agency was re-established once more in 1912, lasting until the Spanish transition to democracy.

The agency was briefly renamed the Directorate-General for Public Order between 1921 and 1923, when it regained its original name. After the Spanish Civil War, the agency increased its role in controlling public order during Franco's dictatorship, becoming one of the main instruments of Francoist repression. It was abolished in 1979 when the current Directorate-General of the Police took over its functions.

== History ==
=== Origins and creation ===
On March 24, 1858, a General Directorate of Security and Public Order was created, with Manuel Ruiz del Cerro appointed to the position. However, this body had a very short existence, and was dissolved in October of that year. In 1886, a General Directorate of Security was re-established under the Ministry of the Interior to centralize all existing police services and security forces. Marshal Antonio Dabán y Ramírez de Arellano was appointed as its first Director General of Security. The agency was abolished in July 1888, but was re-established at the end of 1912. From then on, the new agency became an important instrument of government public order policies.

Between June 1921 and November 1923 the organization was called "General Directorate of Public Order", later recovering its original name.

=== Spanish Civil War and Falangist Spain ===
After the outbreak of the Spanish Civil War, the DGS (Directorate General of Security) came under Republican control, but proved powerless to control the extrajudicial killings, secret prisons, and other "uncontrolled acts" that became commonplace in the early months. In those days of July, the Director of Security, Alonso Mallol, was horrified by the situation and was unable to effectively curb it.

Following the end of the Civil War and the establishment of the Francoist dictatorship, the latter profoundly reorganized the DGS, concentrating numerous services under its direct control and thereby increasing its power. The policy of the victorious side was far from national reconciliation and was based entirely on the vision of victory over the vanquished. The new Law for State Security further emphasized this new character of the DGS.

José Ungría Jiménez was appointed the new director general immediately after the end of the war, and José Finat y Escrivá de Romaní succeeded him. In fact, Escrivá de Romaní would become known for his extremely harsh repression and even invited Heinrich Himmler to visit Madrid, with the idea of establishing police collaboration with the Gestapo.

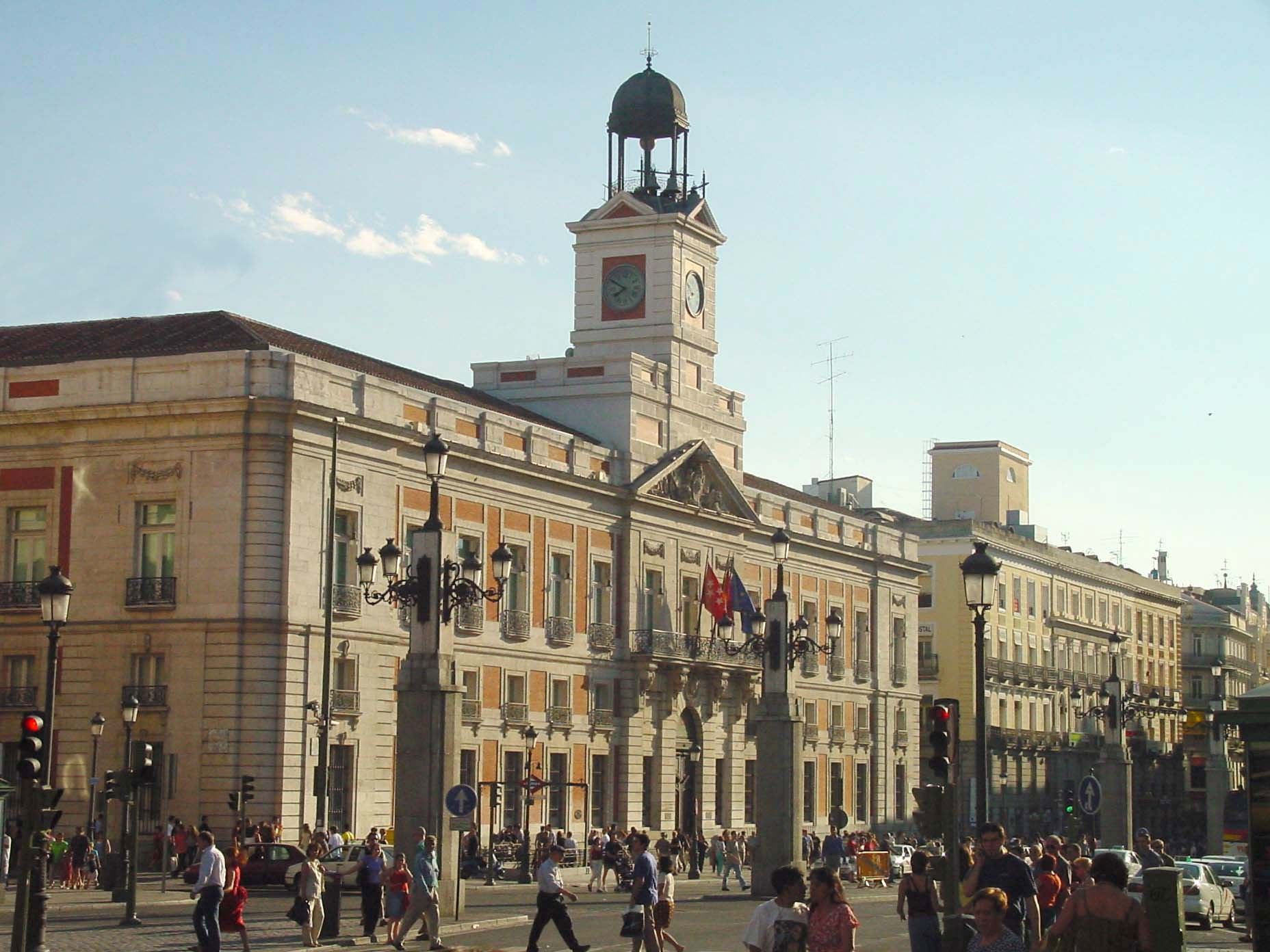
Royal House of the Post Office, headquarters of the DGS.

From 1941, the DGS was entrusted with the task of monitoring public morality and compliance with the rules imposed based on directives on conduct and dress drawn up by the Catholic Church. During the summer period especially, the DGS reported on these instructions (the use of "indecent bathing garments" was prohibited, requiring coverage of the chest and back, and the mandatory use of skirts for women and sports trousers for men) and imposed fines "on those who did not observe behavior in accordance with the required morality."

Its headquarters, which at this time was located in the Royal Post Office in the Puerta del Sol (Madrid), became notorious as a torture center, with well-known cases such as those of the communist leader Julián Grimau, President Companys, and the socialist leader Tomás Centeno , the latter of whom died under mysterious circumstances in the offices of the Directorate General. The period of Carlos Arias Navarro as Director General, under the ministry of Camilo Alonso Vega, was particularly marked by repression. The General Police Corps also had offices in the Puerta del Sol, including those of the Political-Social Brigade

On September 13, 1974, the armed organization ETA-V Assembly carried out the so-called Calle del Correo bombing by planting a powerful bomb in the nearby Rolando cafeteria. The target was the numerous police officers who frequented the establishment, but of the thirteen people killed by the explosion, only one was a police officer. ETA never dared to claim responsibility for the attack.

=== Dissolution ===
Following Franco's death and the beginning of the Spanish transition to democracy, in 1978 the DGS was reorganized to adapt it to the realities of the time. In 1979 the agency was abolished, becoming the current Directorate-General of the Police.

== Directors General of Security ==
Period	Start	Ending	Name	Game
Reign of Alfonso XIII (1902-1931)	November 27, 1912	December 5, 1916	Ramón Méndez Alanís	
Reign of Alfonso XIII (1902-1931)	January 5, 1916	April 18, 1919	Manuel de la Barrera y Caro	Military
Reign of Alfonso XIII (1902-1931)	April 18, 1919	April 20, 1921	Fernando de Torres Almunia	
Reign of Alfonso XIII (1902-1931)	April 20, 1921	December 8, 1922	Millán Millán de Priego y Bedmar	
Reign of Alfonso XIII (1902-1931)	December 8, 1922	September 27, 1923	Carlos Blanco Pérez	Military
Reign of Alfonso XIII (1902-1931)	September 27, 1923	January 29, 1924	Miguel Arlegui Bayonés	Military
Reign of Alfonso XIII (1902-1931)	February 6, 1924	April 12, 1925	José González Hernández	Military
Reign of Alfonso XIII (1902-1931)	April 12, 1925	February 13, 1930	Pedro Bazán Esteban	Military
Reign of Alfonso XIII (1902-1931)	February 13, 1930	April 15, 1931	Emilio Mola	Military
Second Republic (1931-1939)	April 15, 1931	May 14, 1931	Carlos Blanco Pérez	Military
Second Republic (1931-1939)	May 14, 1931	December 18, 1931	Angel Galarza Gago	PRRS
Second Republic (1931-1939)	December 18, 1931	March 4, 1932	Ricardo Herráiz Esteve	
Second Republic (1931-1939)	March 4, 1932	March 6, 1933	Arturo Menéndez López	Military
Second Republic (1931-1939)	March 6, 1933	September 14, 1933	Manuel Andrés Casaus	AR
Second Republic (1931-1939)	September 14, 1933	June 1, 1935	José Valdivia and Garci-Borrón	Military
Second Republic (1931-1939)	November 6, 1935	December 19, 1935	José Gardoqui Urdanibia	Military
Second Republic (1931-1939)	December 19, 1935	February 22, 1936	Vicente Santiago Hodsson	Military
Second Republic (1931-1939)	February 22, 1936	July 31, 1936	José Alonso Mallol	GO
Second Republic (1931-1939)	July 31, 1936	December 31, 1936	Manuel Muñoz Martínez	GO
Second Republic (1931-1939)	December 31, 1936	May 20, 1937	Wenceslao Carrillo Alonso	PSOE
Second Republic (1931-1939)	May 28, 1937	July 18, 1937	Antonio Ortega Gutiérrez	Military
Second Republic (1931-1939)	October 15, 1937	April 1, 1938	Carlos de Juan Rodríguez	PSOE
Second Republic (1931-1939)	April 1, 1938	April 10, 1938	Paulino Gómez Saiz	PSOE
Second Republic (1931-1939)	April 10, 1938	April 17, 1938	Juan Ruiz Olazarán	PSOE
Second Republic (1931-1939)	April 17, 1938	March 13, 1939	Eduardo Cuevas de la Peña	Military
Second Republic (1931-1939)	March 13, 1939	March 29, 1939	Vicente Girauta Linares	PSOE
Francoist Dictatorship (1939-1975)	January 5, 1939	September 26, 1939	José Ungría Jiménez	Military
Francoist Dictatorship (1939-1975)	September 26, 1939	May 10, 1941	José Finat and Escrivá de Romaní	FET y de las JONS
Francoist Dictatorship (1939-1975)	May 10, 1941	June 30, 1942	Gerardo Caballero Olabézar	Military
Francoist Dictatorship (1939-1975)	June 30, 1942	July 27, 1951	Francisco Rodríguez Martínez	Military
Francoist Dictatorship (1939-1975)	July 27, 1951	June 25, 1957	Rafael Hierro Martínez	Military
Francoist Dictatorship (1939-1975)	June 25, 1957	February 5, 1965	Carlos Arias Navarro	FET y de las JONS
Francoist Dictatorship (1939-1975)	February 9, 1965	November 1, 1965	Mariano Tortosa Sobejano	Military
Francoist Dictatorship (1939-1975)	November 20, 1965	February 1, 1974	Eduardo Blanco Rodríguez	Military
Francoist Dictatorship (1939-1975)	February 1, 1974	December 12, 1975	Francisco Dueñas Gavilán	Military
Reign of Juan Carlos I (from 1975)	December 12, 1975	July 23, 1976	Victor Castro Sanmartin	military
Reign of Juan Carlos I (from 1975)	July 23, 1976	December 23, 1976	Emilio Rodríguez Román	FET y de las JONS
Reign of Juan Carlos I (from 1975)	December 23, 1976	May 10, 1979	Mariano Nicolás García	FET and the JONS

== See also ==
- Gerardo Caballero
