= José Moscardó Ituarte =

Spanish military governor (1878–1956)

José Moscardó
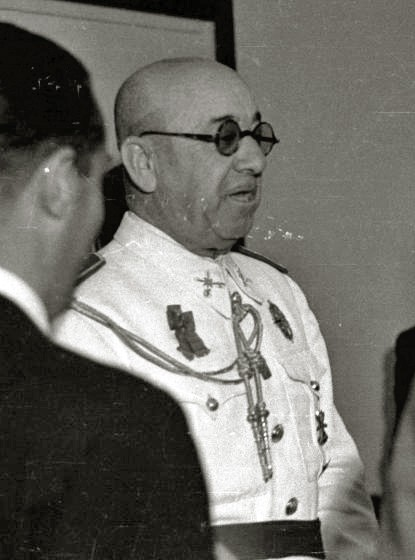
- Born: José Moscardó Ituarte; 26 October 1878; Madrid, Spain
- Died: 12 April 1956 (aged 77); Madrid, Spain
- Military career
- Allegiance: Restoration (Spain); Spanish State
- Branch: Army
- Service years: 1896–1948
- Rank: Captain General
- Commands: Military Governor of Toledo; Captain General of Andalusia; Captain General of Catalonia
- Conflicts: Philippine Revolution; Rif War; Spanish Civil War: Siege of the Alcázar; Invasion of Val d'Aran
- Awards: Laureate Cross of Saint Ferdinand

José Moscardó e Ituarte, 1st Count of the Alcázar of Toledo, Grandee of Spain (26 October 1878 – 12 April 1956) was the military Governor of Toledo Province during the Spanish Civil War. He sided with the Nationalist army fighting the Republican government and his most notable action was the defence and holding of the Alcázar of Toledo against Republican forces.

When still a Colonel and military governor of the province, Moscardó was described by the English Major Geoffrey McNeill-Moss as "a tall, reserved, gentle-mannered man, a little awkward, rather punctillious: happy enough with a few people he knew well, but shy in company. He had a strict sense of duty. He was religious. In a nation where most were slack, he was exact."

For some time leading up to the Civil War Moscardó had lived in semi-retirement, a middle-aged soldier. When conflict commenced he assumed the role of Commandant of the citadel in Toledo, with a total garrison of 1,028, which included six hundred Civil Guard under their own commander, 150 army officers, 35 Falangists, 10 Carlists, 25 members of the Monarchist Association, and 40 peasants and workmen. In addition there were 670 non-combatants including 100 men too old to serve, 520 women and 50 children.

== Spanish Civil War ==
The Siege of the Alcázar commenced and Moscardó held out for General Francisco Franco's Nationalist forces for 70 days from 22 July to 27 September 1936. Day after day, the Colonel sent out his daily radio report: Sin novedad en el Alcázar ("Nothing new at the Alcázar," or "All quiet at the Alcázar", an ironic understatement). His defiance heartened the Nationalists everywhere and maddened the Republicans, who committed vast forces in vain assaults on the Alcázar.

On 23 July, Republican forces captured Moscardó's 24-year-old son, Luis. They called the Alcázar on the telephone and Moscardó himself picked up the receiver. The political officer of the Republican force informed him that unless he surrendered the Alcázar, Luis would be shot. Moscardó asked to speak to his son. He then told Luis, "Commend your soul to God and die like a patriot, shouting 'Long live Christ the King' and 'Long live Spain.'" "That," answered his son, "I can do." Although it has been viewed that Luis was immediately shot, other accounts provided that he was in fact shot a month later "in reprisal for an air raid".

During the siege, a blindfolded Major Rojo approached the badly battered citadel with a white flag on September 9. His mission was to offer the garrison their lives if they would surrender. His proposal was rejected, but on leaving he asked Moscardó if he could convey any requests to the outside. Moscardó asked that a priest might be sent to the garrison to baptise children born during the siege. The Republicans agreed and sent in Canon Vásquez Camarassa. Of the priests in Toledo, only seven who were in hiding escaped massacre by the Republicans, so the Canon was in that respect lucky to be alive, said to be because of his left-wing sympathies. He urged the civilians, the women and children in particular to leave under a white flag. The unanimous reply was a refusal.

When the Alcázar was finally relieved, Moscardó is said to have greeted the relief force's commanding Colonel. He had lost his son but saved his garrison. He stood stiffly to the salute and said, "No change to report."

The rebel forces executed some of the hostages Moscardó kept in the Alcázar; also 100 wounded interns at the Tavera Hospital had their throats slit, 20 pregnant women were taken out of the Maternity and were shot down because they were deemed "red", and a number of additional republican militiamen were killed in the ensuing repression, including those burned alive by the rebels in the College of Maristas, 80 in the Archbishopric Palace and more than 100 militiamen in the seminary Seminario.

A similar incident in Spanish history is that concerning Guzmán el Bueno, who chose the death of his son to surrendering the Tarifa fortress in 1296.

The defence of the Alcázar became a symbol of heroism in Francoist Spain. Moscardó was promoted to Army General after the relief of the Alcázar, and put in command of the Soria Division. In 1938 he was given command of the Aragon Army Corps, but took part in no further heroic episodes.

Franco, however, knew the value of propaganda and authorized Moscardó to wear a special black cloak of mourning for his son over his army uniform. This he did for the rest of his life, so that every soldier who saw him would know who he was.

== Francoist Spain ==
In late 1944, Moscardó, in command at Barcelona, led the successful defence against incursions by Spanish communists via the Val d'Aran into Lleida. In March 1945 he was named head of Franco's Casa Militar (personal military staff).

In 1948, he was created Count of the Alcázar of Toledo and a Grandee of Spain.

His singular passion remained football, and he coached the Spanish football team at the 1948 London Olympic Games and the 1952 Games in Helsinki, guiding Spain's squad through two Olympic campaigns as part of his commitment to the sport.

In 1947, he was responsible for returning the Spain National Football Team main colour to red, which had been changed in 1939 due to its association with the Republicans.

== Death ==
He died on 12 April 1956 in Madrid at 77 years old, and was then promoted to Capitán General del Ejército. On 17 September 2018, after the planned exhumation of Francisco Franco, it was proposed by Podemos to also exhume Jaime Milans del Bosch and Moscardó, but it was rejected by Vox.

== Bibliography ==
- Antony Beevor, The Battle for Spain, 2006.
- Lunn, Arnold (1937). Spanish Rehearsal. London: Hutchinson & Co.
- Requena Gallego, Manuel (2008). "Aspectos militares de la guerra en Castilla-La Mancha. Del Alcázar de Toledo a las Brigadas Internacionales". In Francisco Alía Miranda y Ángel Ramón del Valle Calzado (ed.). La guerra civil en Castilla-La Mancha, 70 años después: actas del Congreso Internacional. Cuenca, Spain: Ediciones de la Universidad de Castilla-La Mancha. pp. 393–410. ISBN 978-84-8427-555-8.
- Thomas, Hugh (2001). The Spanish Civil War (4th ed.). Modern Library. ISBN 9780375755156.

Sporting positions
Preceded by Augusto Pi Suñer	President of the Spanish Olympic Committee; 1941–1956	Succeeded by José Antonio Elola-Olaso
Spanish nobility
New creation	Count of the Alcázar of Toledo; 18 July 1948	Succeeded by Miguel Moscardó y Guzmán
