= San Isidro Ski Resort =

Ski resort in the Cantabrian Mountains, Spain

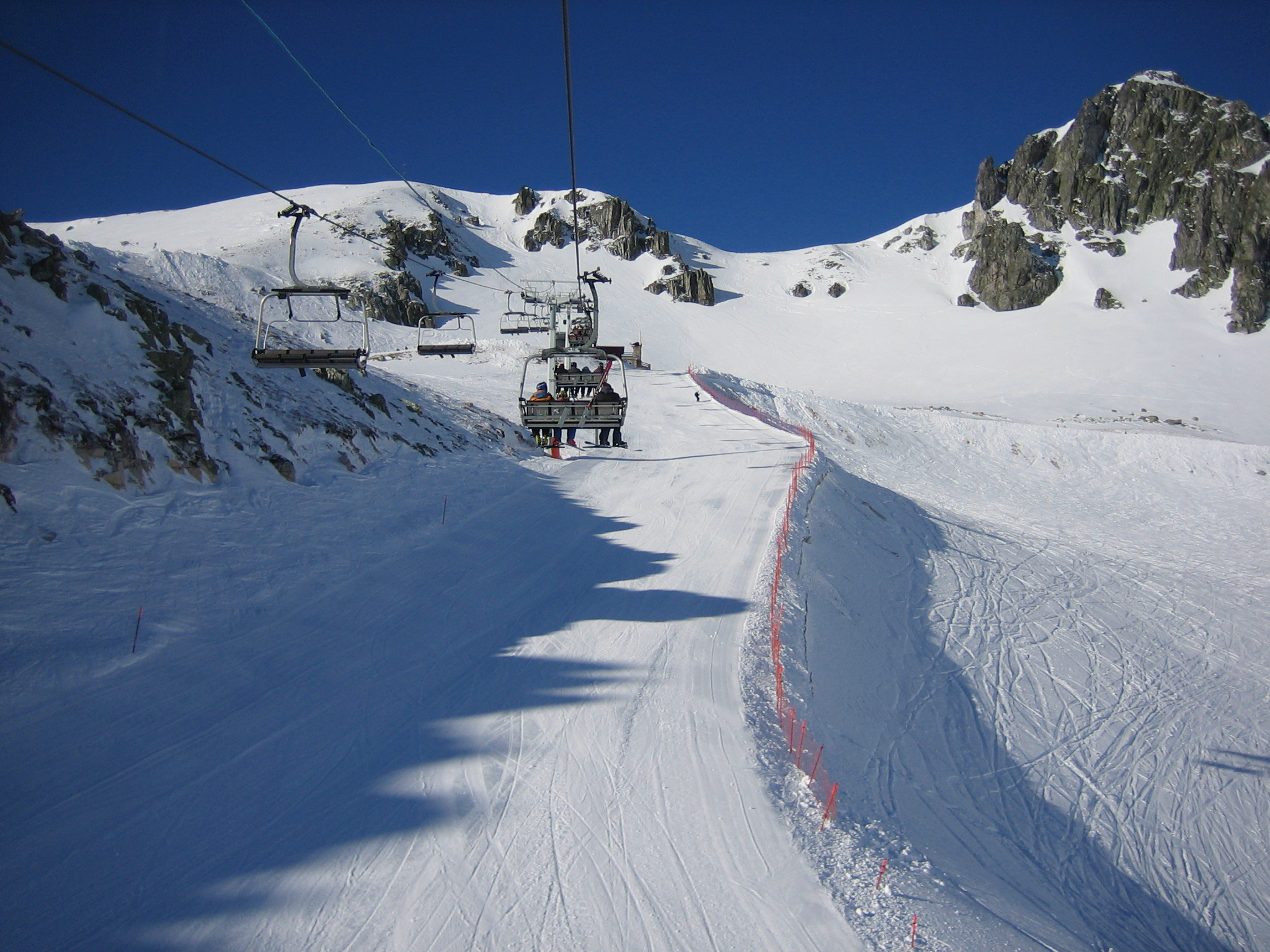
- Interactive map of San Isidro Ski Resort
- Location: Cantabrian Mountains, Spain
- Coordinates: 43°02′49″N 5°22′40″W
- Top elevation: 2,050 m (6,730 ft)
- Base elevation: 1,500 m (4,920 ft)
- Skiable area: 34,5
- Trails: Green - 5 Blue - 9 Red - 13; Black - 4
- Lift system: Chairlift: 6 places = 0; 4 places = 2; 3 places = 0; 2 places = 2; Ski lift = 8 Conveyor belt = 4
- Lift capacity: 15,800
- Snowmaking: 1.8 km^{2} (0.69 sq mi); 54 cannons
- Website: http://www.nieveleonsanisidro.com

San Isidro Ski Resort
- Interactive map of San Isidro Ski Resort

The San Isidro Ski Resort, which was inaugurated in 1974, is located in the mountain pass of the same name in the Cantabrian mountain range, in the northern part of the province of León, autonomous community of Castilla y León, Spain. Its facilities are located in Puebla de Lillo and Valdelugueros municipalities, which correspond to the valleys of Alto Porma and Alto Curueño. It is owned by the Provincial Council of León, which is in charge of its management, as is Leitariegos, also in León.

== History ==
=== Background ===
San Isidro's history begins in the 1960s the Leonese government decided to enter the snow business, reserving funds for investment in the Pajares winter resort. The president of that resort, Jesús Suárez Valgrande, declined to accept those funds. As a result, the idea of the San Isidro winter resort was born, since León decided to invest these funds in building its resort in its territory. Initially, two projects would be created to create two ski resorts, one in the port of San Isidro and the other in the port of Tarna. However, it would be the first one that would finally receive the investment, the Leonese government did not forget about the Tarna project, installing two ski lifts at the top of the port.

The beginnings of the San Isidro Winter Resort were hindered by boundary problems with the Principality of Asturias, delaying the start of the works until the 1970s. Consequently, the activity in the mountain pass remained in the background compared to the Pajares station, due to the precarious communications that connected the San Isidro mountain pass with León and Asturias. This did not prevent the mountain pass from starting to have some mountaineering activity not linked to skiing, and during the 1960s two mountain huts were built at the top of the mountain pass.

Little by little, the development of skiing reached the San Isidro pass, with a scarce influx of skiers at the beginning due to the development of the neighboring Pajares, which already had two ski lifts. At the end of the sixties, the San Isidro resort inaugurated its first ski lift in the Salencias area, which was nothing more than a ski lift that worked with a gasoline engine and had only two perches. The architects of the beginning of the station were Diego Mella, responsible for the installation of the ski lift, and Felipe Moreno, to whom we owe the first building of the station, built in 1969, and which is currently the cafeteria of the Salencias area.

=== 1970-1980 ===
In 1972, the winter resort of San Isidro saw the installation of the first ski lift by the Provincial Council of León in the area of Salencias, the so-called Salencias I. The following year, in 1973, the debutant ski lift and La Raya ski lift were opened, extending the skiable surface of the resort to 5 km. Finally, in 1974, the resort was officially inaugurated with the incorporation of the first chairlift of the resort, the old Cebolledo chairlift. A few years later, the resort continued to grow with the construction of the Salencias II and Las Piedra's chairlifts.

The resort continued its development and received an increasing number of skiers, but due to the youth of its facilities, San Isidro did not have a ski lift, which made it difficult to make certain descents. The morphology of the existing slopes differed from the current configuration since Cebolledo only had two slopes, of which the main one occupied the Cebolledo pit, ending in a cut where some jumps were practiced. In this cut, the track was divided in two, the one that followed the chairlift, on the right, and another one on the left. These slopes were of great difficulty and made Cebolledo an area for experienced skiers. The lower difficulty of the Salencias slopes made then that the greatest affluence was centered in that area and Las Piedras, forming these places the core of the resort.

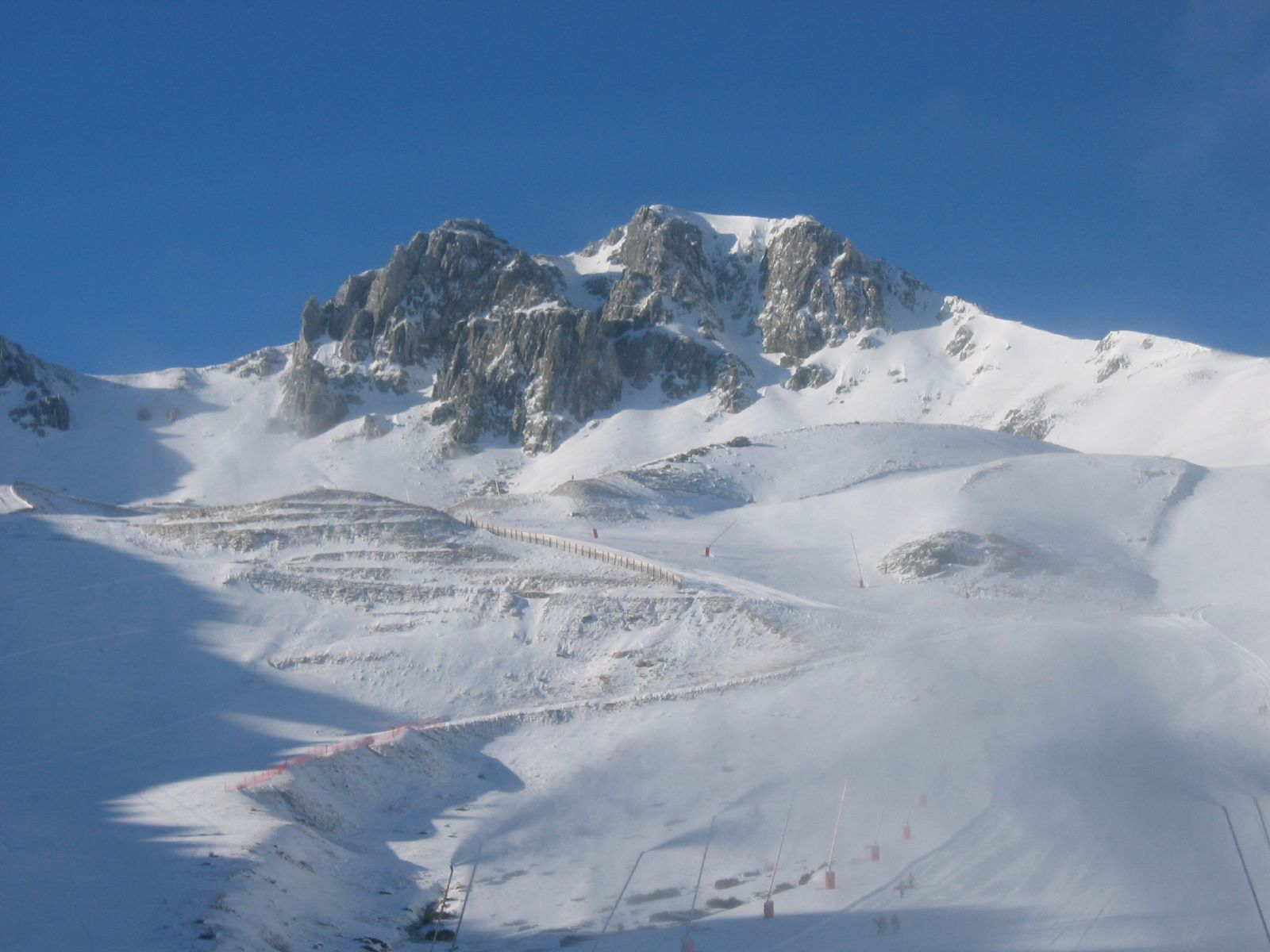
Circo de Cebolledo

With the expansion of the domain, the Provincial Council of León planned San Isidro as a resort with a size comparable to the Pyrenean resorts, based on a popular model in the French Alps, which defined a resort divided into zones, one for beginners separated from the rest to avoid crowds and improve the quality of the whole resort. Thus, Salencias was chosen as the main beginners' zone, where the Ski School was installed. Following the aforementioned model, in 1975, the Requejines ski lift was installed, different from the current one, extending the resort towards that area. Another ski lift for beginners was also installed in the area, making Requejines the alternative to Salencias for beginners when snow was scarce in the latter. In 1976, continuing with the expansion, which already endangered the hegemony of Pajares, the Cebolledo ski lift was installed, different from the current one, to give access to the flat area of the sector and replace the obsolete existing chairlift. This year also saw the purchase of the first ski lift machine, which would give a qualitative leap to the station.

Between 1977 and 1980, the economic crisis brought San Isidro's aspirations to a halt, albeit momentarily. Despite this, in those years Cebolledo was remodeled, to put into service new slopes, the first of them was La Travesía, of a fairly high difficulty that would become famous by creating the saying "If you ski in San Isidro, you can ski anywhere".

=== 1980-1990 ===
The 1980s was a truly golden era for the resort, as a large number of new facilities were opened in San Isidro. At the beginning of the decade, in 1980, the first Riopinos ski lift was installed, the existing one at Cebolledo was extended and the one at Requejines was extended. Thanks to these new lifts, the resort covered the entire current skiable domain.

Nevertheless, the government's idea continued to be to create a resort that could compare with others in the country. Therefore, in 1982, two new ski lifts were built, Peñanevares and Riopinos II, whose objective was to connect with future skiable areas. Thanks to these two new facilities, the idea of San Isidro as an outstanding resort was taking shape, but once again, problems with Asturias hindered its development. The problem was that the Riopinos II ski lift connected with areas that belonged to the Principality, which was not willing to develop these areas for the León resort (this area is currently occupied by the Fuentes de Invierno resort). The other ski lift, Peñanevares, also remained in the background when the extension of the resort in the adjacent valley was not successful, even though it had ideal characteristics for its development. In 1983 the Requejines ski lift was extended.

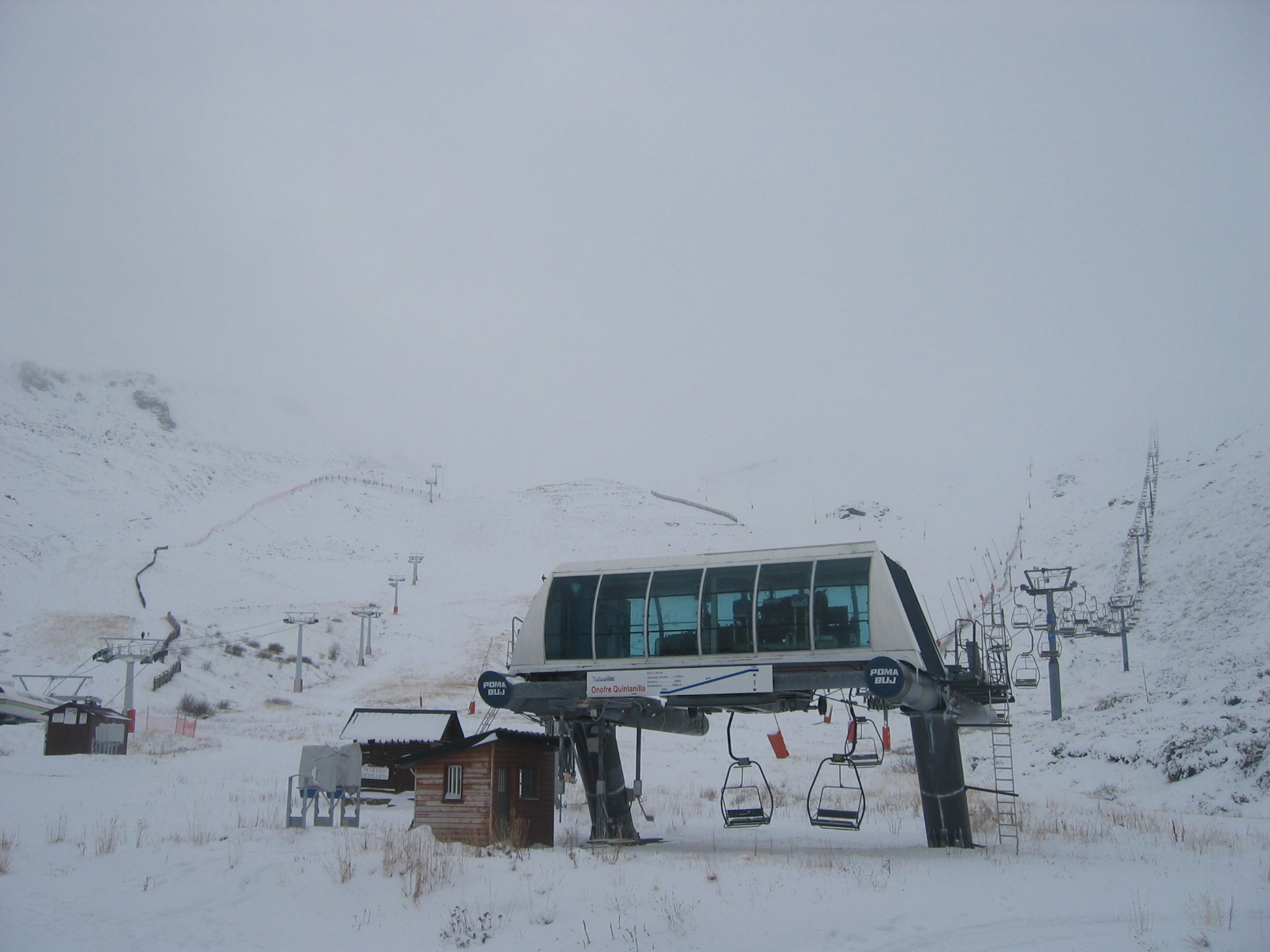
Onofre-Quintanilla ski lift

The growth of the resort, which endangered its proper operation with an unforeseen saturation, led to the expansion of the Cebolledo parking lot and the installation of the Onofre-Quintanilla chairlift in 1984. With these improvements, San Isidro overtook Pajares and became the largest ski resort in the Cantabrian Mountains. In 1985, in an attempt to further correct the saturation that afflicted the resort, the Riopinos chairlift was opened. Thanks to these facilities, San Isidro made a qualitative leap that increased its services, slopes, and capacity. At the end of the decade, the resort exceeded 100,000 visitors per year for the first time in its history.

The resort, however, saw its heyday cut short when the warmest winter in history occurred in 1988, causing San Isidro to barely open for the entire season. In that year the Las Piedras ski lift was also dismantled, which would later spend a long time piled up in the Saliencias area. The following year, the situation was the opposite and there were historic snowfalls, causing the resort to remain open until the first weekend of June. All this seemed to indicate that the nineties would be as good a year as the eighties had been.

=== 1990-2000 ===
Despite the problems that would follow, the 1990s began with heavy snowfalls in 1990, 1991, and 1992. It was not until 1993 that snow began to become scarce. This did not prevent the development of some works, such as remodeling slopes in Cebolledo and improving the La Travesía slope.

The changes in the station were necessary because it was oversaturated by an influx that did not stop growing and was unable to support it and by the lack of investment by the Provincial Council of León.

This led to a total modernization of the resort, opening the detachable ski lift, which replaced the old Cebolledo ski lift, and the four-seater Requejines ski lift. However, this modernization was not matched by the weather, which led to one of the worst seasons of the resort, as snow was scarce from the beginning.

At the end of the nineties, the access to the San Isidro resort was significantly improved with the adaptation of the road to the Asturian side of the mountain pass. This work, which significantly improved the resort's competitiveness, was accompanied shortly afterward by the opening of the artificial snow cannons, which were the first in a resort in the Cantabrian mountain range and which initially snowed an area of approximately one kilometer in length in the Cebolledo area.

=== 21st Century ===
In the 21st century, the resort continues to see an increase in the number of visitors to its slopes. Officially, it has 24.8 kilometers of slopes, although those kilometers must be discounted from the Silencio Valley slopes, which have never been open.

In recent years, San Isidro has been experiencing a period of expansion, with a sustained increase in the number of ski passes sold and an improvement in the number of days the resort is open. It is also one of the resorts that has grown the most in terms of the number of users and is one of the ones that sell the most season passes in the country.

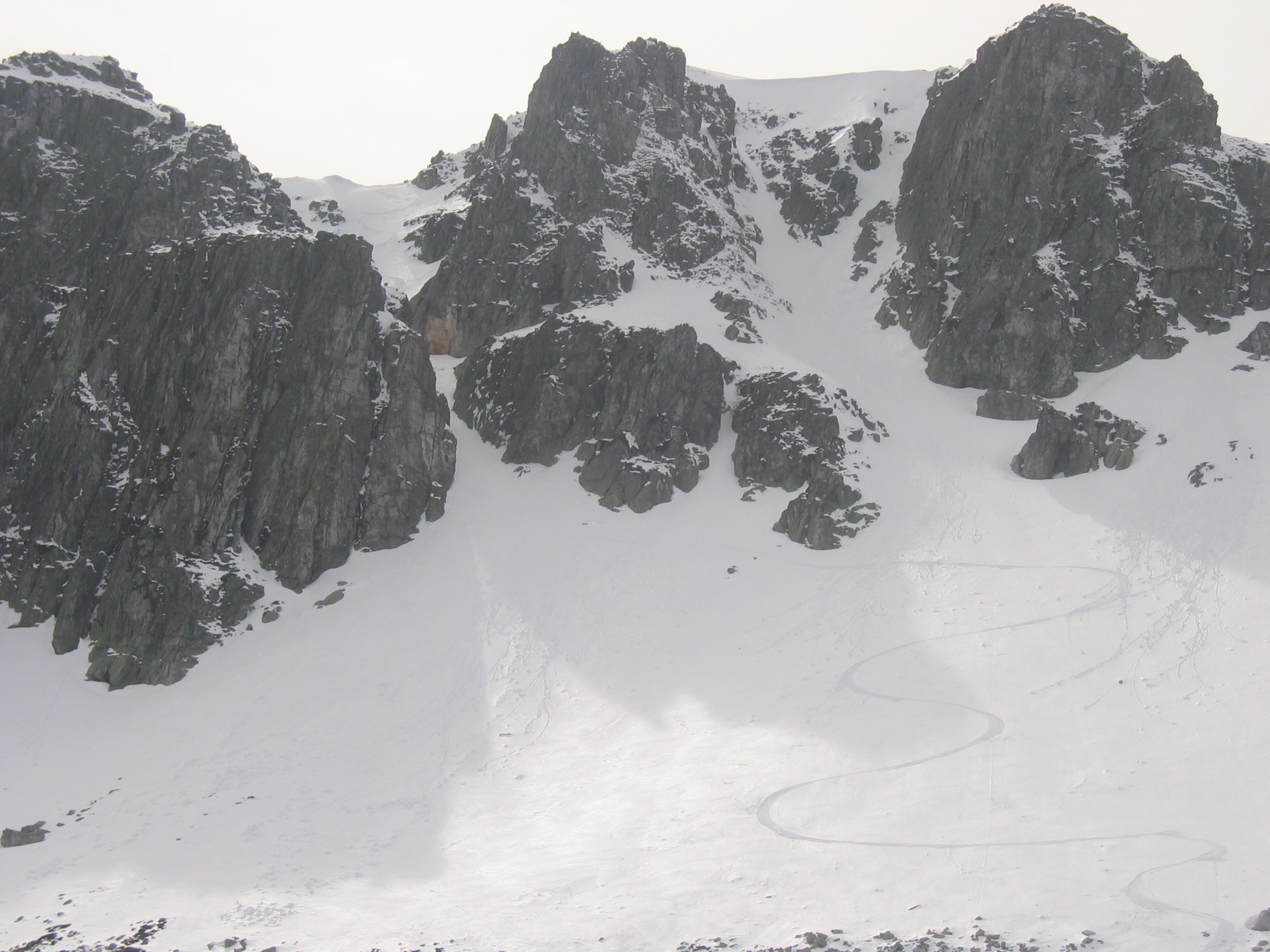
Pico Agujas

All this means that the future of the San Isidro resort currently depends on the expansion of hotel accommodation in the area, something that is being carried out, despite some delays due to problems with the power line that supplies the resort, with 400 new hotel rooms at the foot of the slopes, 200 of which would correspond to a five-star hotel. In addition to this, seasonal diversification is also important, something that the Provincial Council proposed at the time with a sports center and a golf course, actions which, however, have been paralyzed due to legal problems in the first case and political problems in the second, due to the lack of agreement on the power line. However, the most important thing for the resort is to increase the number of ski lifts, the artificial snowmaking systems, and the skiable area, without forgetting the connection with the Asturian resort of Fuentes de Invierno.

== Access to the resort ==
Due to its location in the Alto Porma region, located in the north of the province of León, on the border between this and the Principality of Asturias, it is easily accessible from both sides.

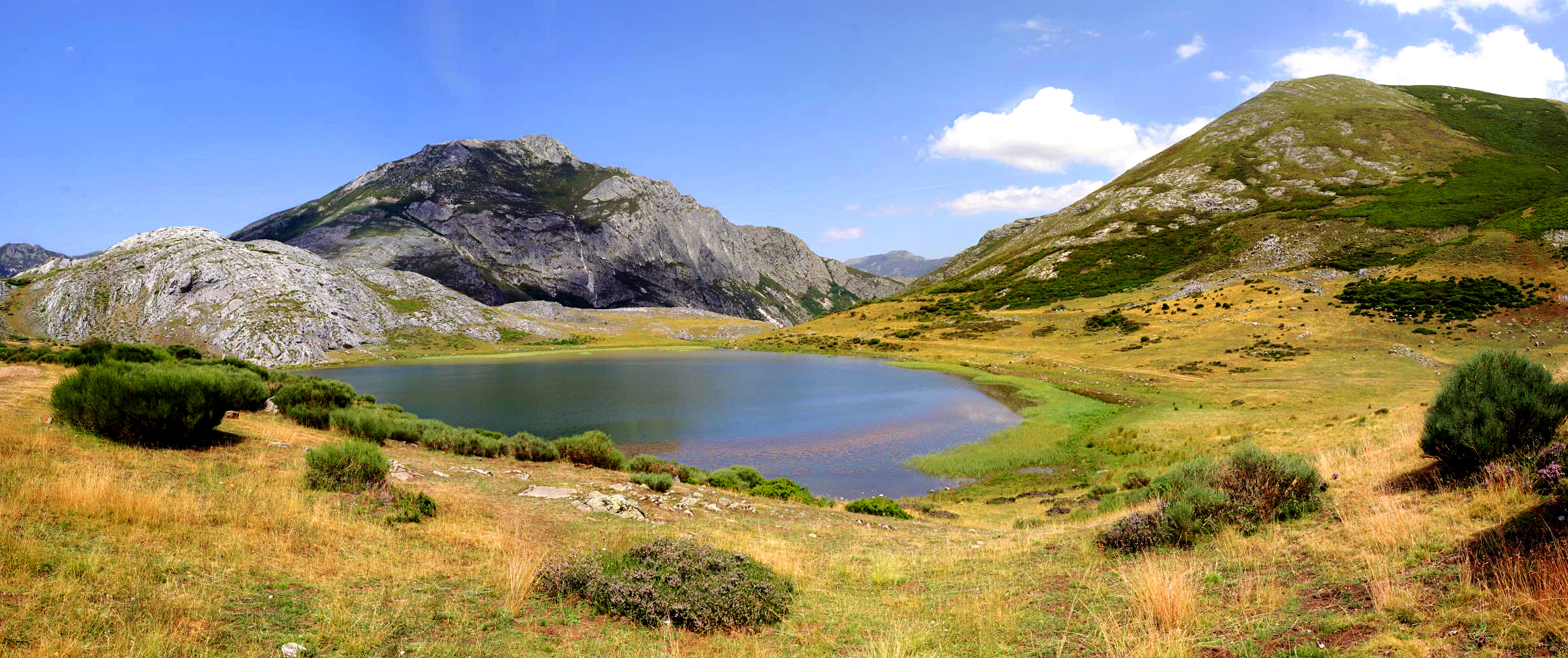
Lake Isoba, next to the LE-332 road that gives access to the station.

=== From León ===
From León, there are two accesses: the first one through the LE-331 from Boñar and the LE-332 from Puebla de Lillo. The other access is through the Curueño Valley, from La Vecilla, using the LE-321 road until reaching the Puerto de Vegarada, where there is an access road to the Riopinos slope.

=== From Asturias ===
From the Principality of Asturias, there are also two accesses. The first one uses the A-66 up to the exit on the AS-112, at Ujo, a road that continues to the village of Cabañaquinta, from where you take the AS-253 to the port of San Isidro.

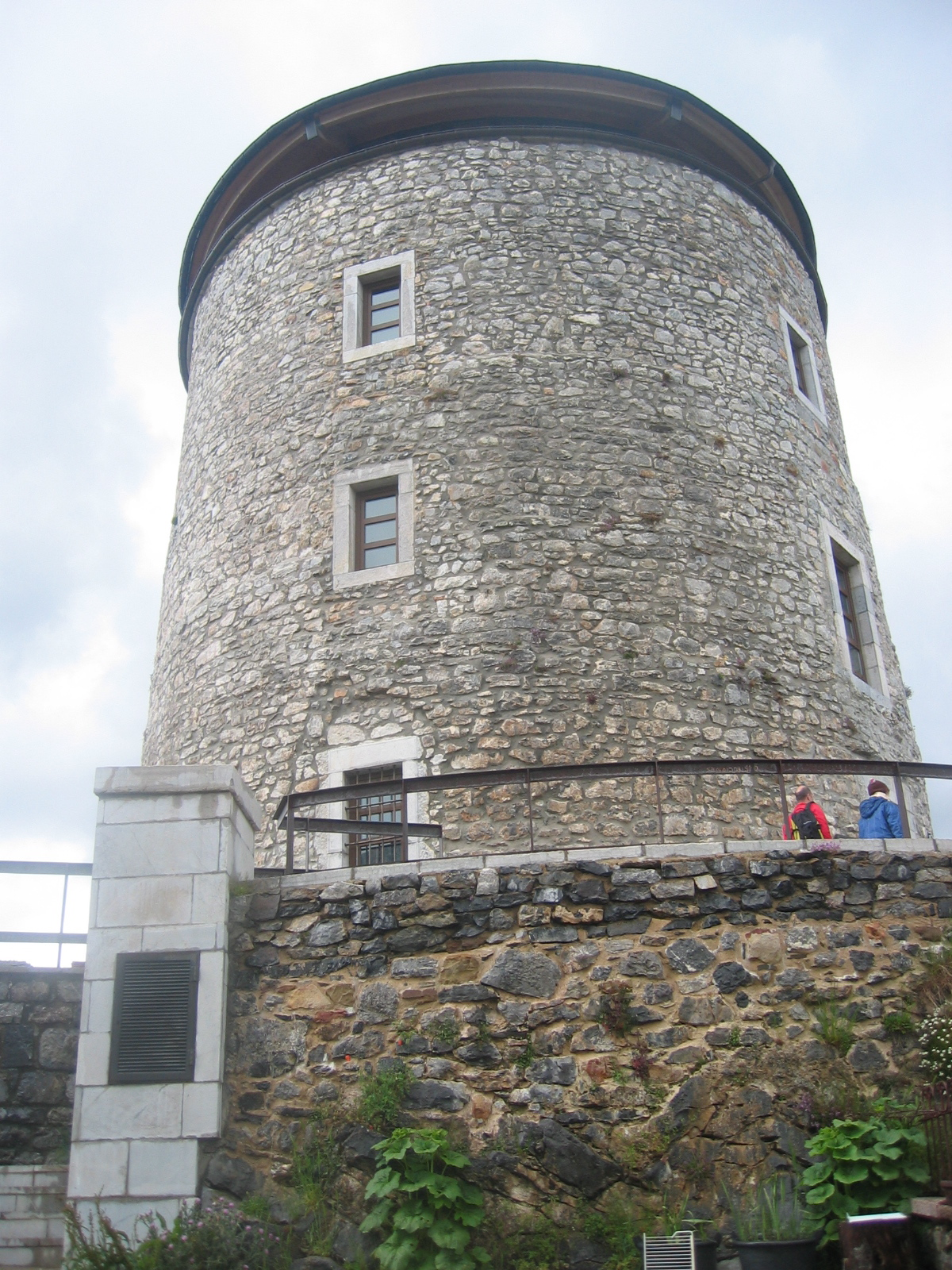
Puebla de Lillo Tower

The second would be using the Riopinos slope, which can be accessed using the A-66 highway to Campomanes, where you take the detour on the N-630. When reaching Villamanín enter the road to Cármenes and from here it continues along the LE-313 and LE-321 roads, from which you can reach Puerto de Vegarada, where the access is located.

Today, due to boundary issues, the Valdelugueros town council has begun to take steps for the construction of new accesses, through the Casomera Valley and the Vegarada pass, to connect San Isidro with Asturias on the Curueño side.

== Ski areas ==
Cebolledo

The Cebolledo area is located in the glacier cirque of the same name, called Pico Agujas. It has a total of seven slopes distributed between 1680 and 2010 meters of altitude and classified into two green (Rebeco and Debutantes), two blue (Cebolledo and Travesía), four red (Los Sentiles, El Circo, El Toneo and Gran Cañón) and two black (La Solana and La Collada). It has four ski lifts, which are a four-seater detachable chairlift, a two-seater chairlift, a chairlift (closed and out of operation), and two conveyor belts. Cebolledo is considered the center of the resort because of its medium-high level of difficulty, the beginners' area, and because it has access to the Requejines and Riopinos sectors. It has a skiable domain of 8.245 km, 3 of which are snowed by the 53 canyons that are in operation in the area.

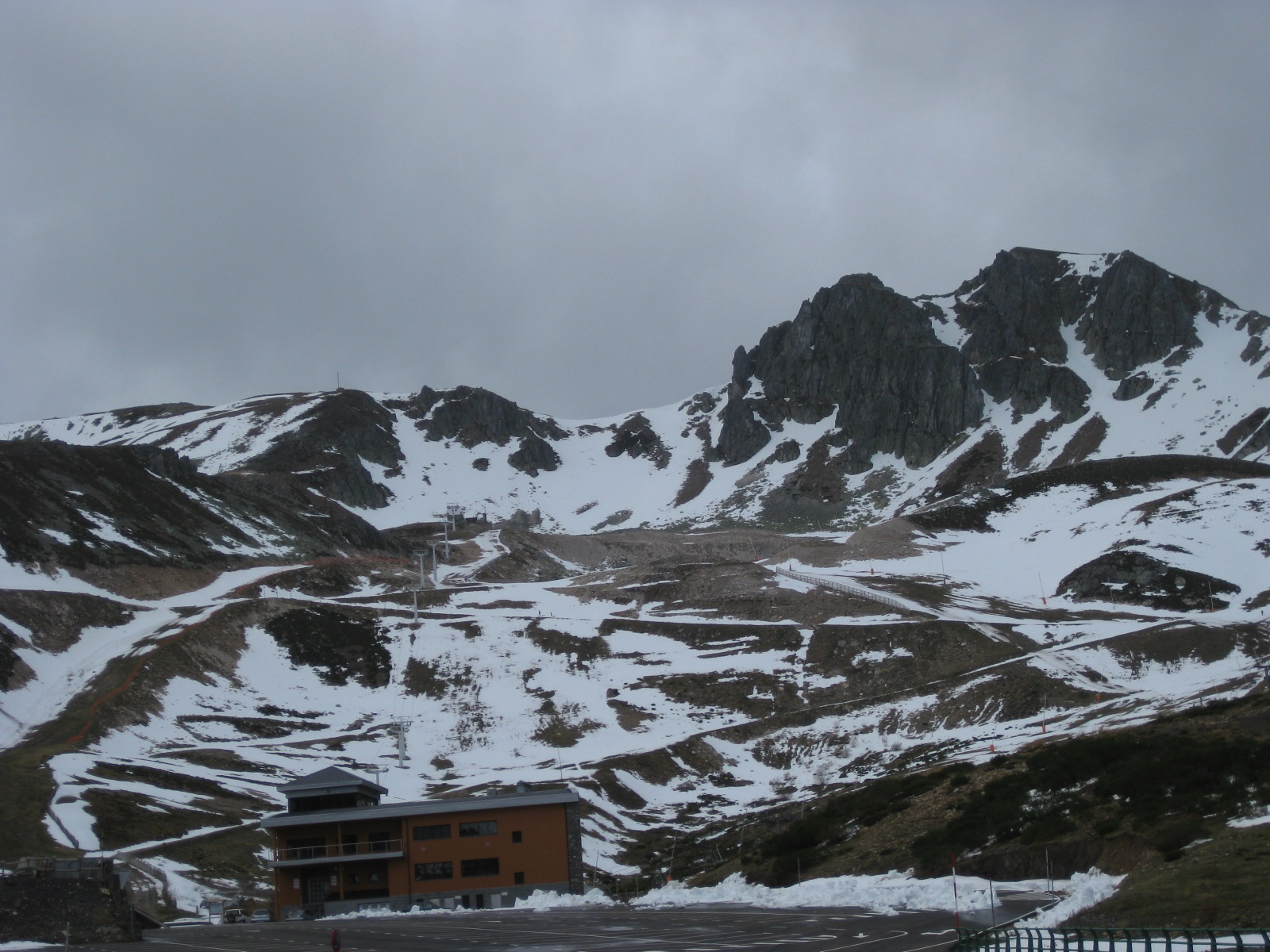
View of Circo de Cebolledo with the first autumn snows.

Sentiles and Gran Cañón slopes host regional alpine skiing championships.

Requejines

The Requejines area is located next to Pico Agujas. It has a total of five slopes distributed between 1810 and 2040 meters, classified as one green (Requejines debutantes), one blue (Las Liebres), three red (Peñanevares, Respina, and Las Fuentes), and one black (El Silencio). It has three ski lifts, which are a four-seater chairlift, a ski lift, and a telebaby. Requejines is an area for beginners due to the predominance of easy slopes interspersed with others of greater difficulty. From this sector, there is access to other off-piste routes well known among expert skiers, such as Peñanevares-Valle del Silencio and Pico Agujas. It has a skiable domain of 4.950 kilometers, none of them snowed.

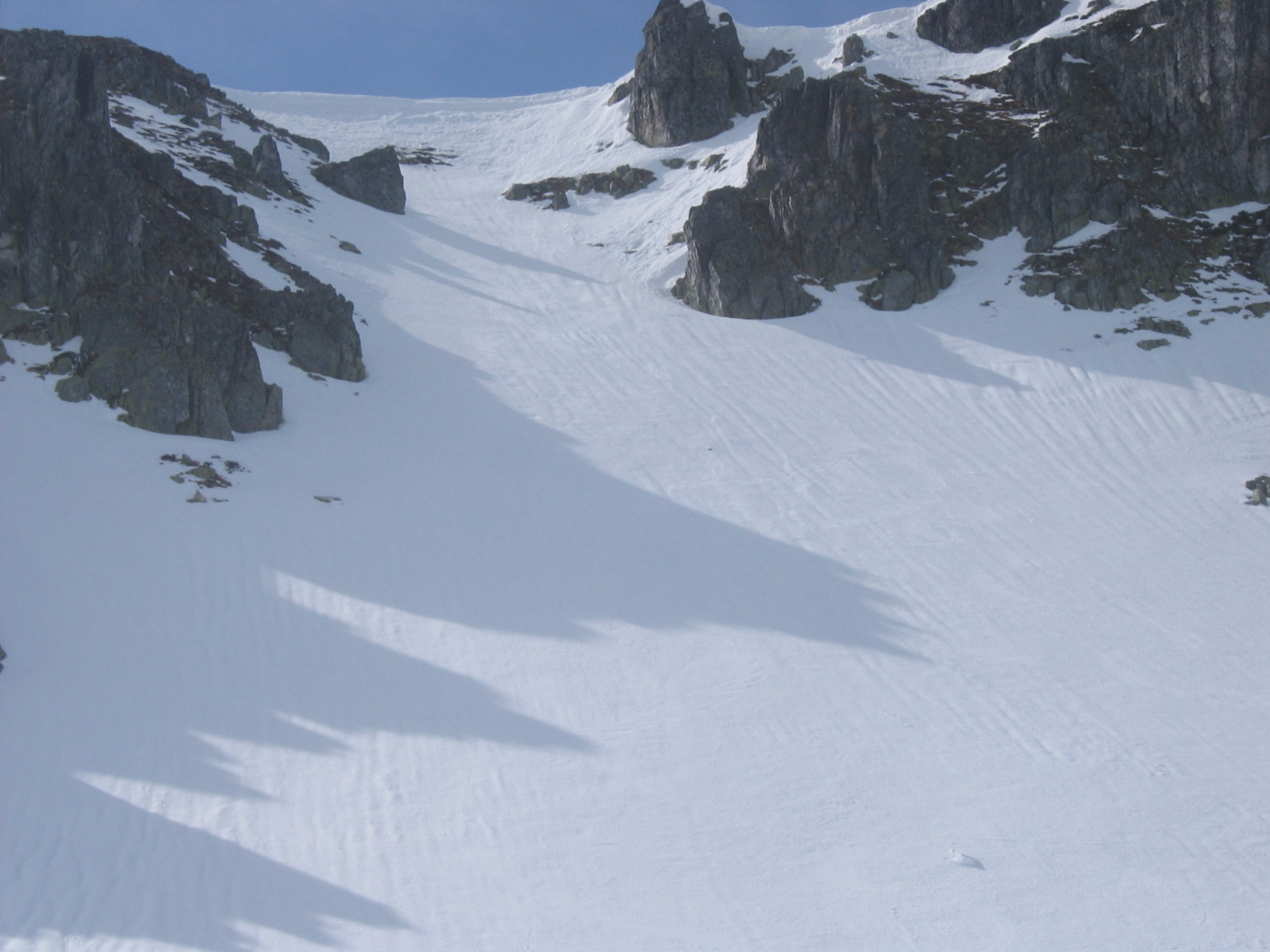
Off-pist of the Needles Peak Slope

Due to its location, at a higher altitude than the rest of the resort, and its orientation, it is where the snow is preserved the longest of the entire resort, being the last to close in almost every season.

Riopinos

The Riopinos sector has five slopes, located between 1675 and 2000 meters of altitude and classified as one green (Riopinos debutantes), two blue (del Oso and Curueño), two red (el Valle and Vegarada Exprés), and one black (los Cazadores). It has three ski lifts, a two-seater chairlift, one rope lift, and one conveyor belt. From this area, there is also access to the off-piste of Tubos del Toneo, which after 500 meters of slope ends in the Salencias area. It has a skiable domain of 5.225 kilometers, none of them snowed.

Since 2003, this sector has had a second access to the resort, through the Vegarada pass. It has a parking lot with a capacity for 150 vehicles and a multi-service building with lockers for the sale of ski passes, a cafeteria, and toilets, among other services. Thanks to this access, the winter resort has invigorated the Alto Curueño Valley.

Salencias - La Raya

Salencias is the lowest area of the resort, it has eight slopes distributed between 1500 and 1640 meters of altitude and is classified as one green slope (Salencias beginners), two blue (Los Piornos and La Tortuga), and three red (Las Lomas I, Las Lomas II and La Perdiz). It has 3 ski lifts, two chairlifts, and one telebaby.

Already in the Principality of Asturias, and within the same station, is the area of La Raya, which has a blue run (La Raya) and two red runs (F-1 and F-2) with a ski lift.

Salencias - La Raya is the favorite place for those who are new to the sport of skiing and do not want to venture to take a chairlift to get started in Requejines. It is an area separated from the rest of the resort with a skiable domain of 5.820 kilometers that, with the Master Plan, will be joined to the Cebolledo sector by means of a new run and a chairlift.

== Expansion of the resort ==
=== Master plan ===
The San Isidro Master Plan was received by the Provincial Council in April 2006.

The plan establishes that within six years the resort would receive an investment of approximately 40 million euros in winter equipment alone. The plan would focus on several areas: the growth of the resort by eight kilometers of slopes in the Riopinos and Requejines areas, in addition to the 24.8 kilometers already existing, making up a 32.8-kilometer alpine ski resort; in the snowmaking of all the sectors of the resort, which would allow a substantial improvement of the enclave when facing adverse weather conditions; and in the renovation of the ski lifts, which would be replaced by four-seater chairs and conveyor belts, which would provide the resort with eight new lifts, not including those necessary for the start-up of the Riopinos and Requejines slopes.

Other elements of this plan would be the creation of a slope connecting the Salencias and Cebolledo areas, eliminating the two ski lifts, which would be replaced by a four-seater chairlift that would run for 1070 meters, a distance from which the slope to the Cebolledo area would begin. On the other hand, the Master Plan is betting on a snowpark, which would be built in the area known as the Plaza de Toros, to accommodate a group of skiers that has increased in recent years. For all these reasons, the Plan would base the growth of the resort on the beginners' areas, to access the market with the greatest potential in the sector, and on the adaptation of the Riopinos area to promote access from the Vegarada pass through the Alto Curueño region.

On another level, the area surrounding the resort would be developed to increase the number of hotel rooms at the foot of the slopes. Thus, the resort would have 500 new hotel rooms, 180 of which would come from a five-star hotel. In addition, a total of 400 new homes would be developed, 93 of which would be chalets practically at the foot of the slopes. The development of these hotel and residential facilities is at a standstill due to the delay in the construction of the high-voltage line that will supply the winter resorts of San Isidro and Fuentes de Invierno.

=== Connection with Fuentes de Invierno ===
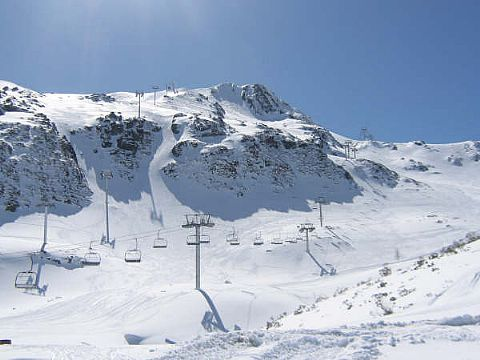
Fuentes de Invierno is located next to San Isidro, which makes their merger possible.

The rapprochement of positions between Asturias and León has made possible an agreement in principle for the merger of the ski resorts of San Isidro and Fuentes de Invierno.

The merger, which has not been specified in dates, will be carried out with the construction of a ski lift between both resorts, a ski lift that in San Isidro will be located in the Riopinos domain, on the Curueño slope. The objective of the merger is to offer a resort at the height of the Pyrenees resorts and to consolidate itself as the most important in the Cantabrian mountain range, since after the extension of San Isidro by 8 km, up to 32, the resort would have 40 km or 52 with the maximum development of Fuentes de Invierno.

== Resort surroundings ==
The resort is surrounded by natural areas of great environmental value, such as the valleys of Alto Curueño and Alto Porma, which are part of the Regional Park of Picos de Europa, corresponding to the municipalities of Valdelugueros and Puebla de Lillo respectively.

=== The slope of the Porma ===
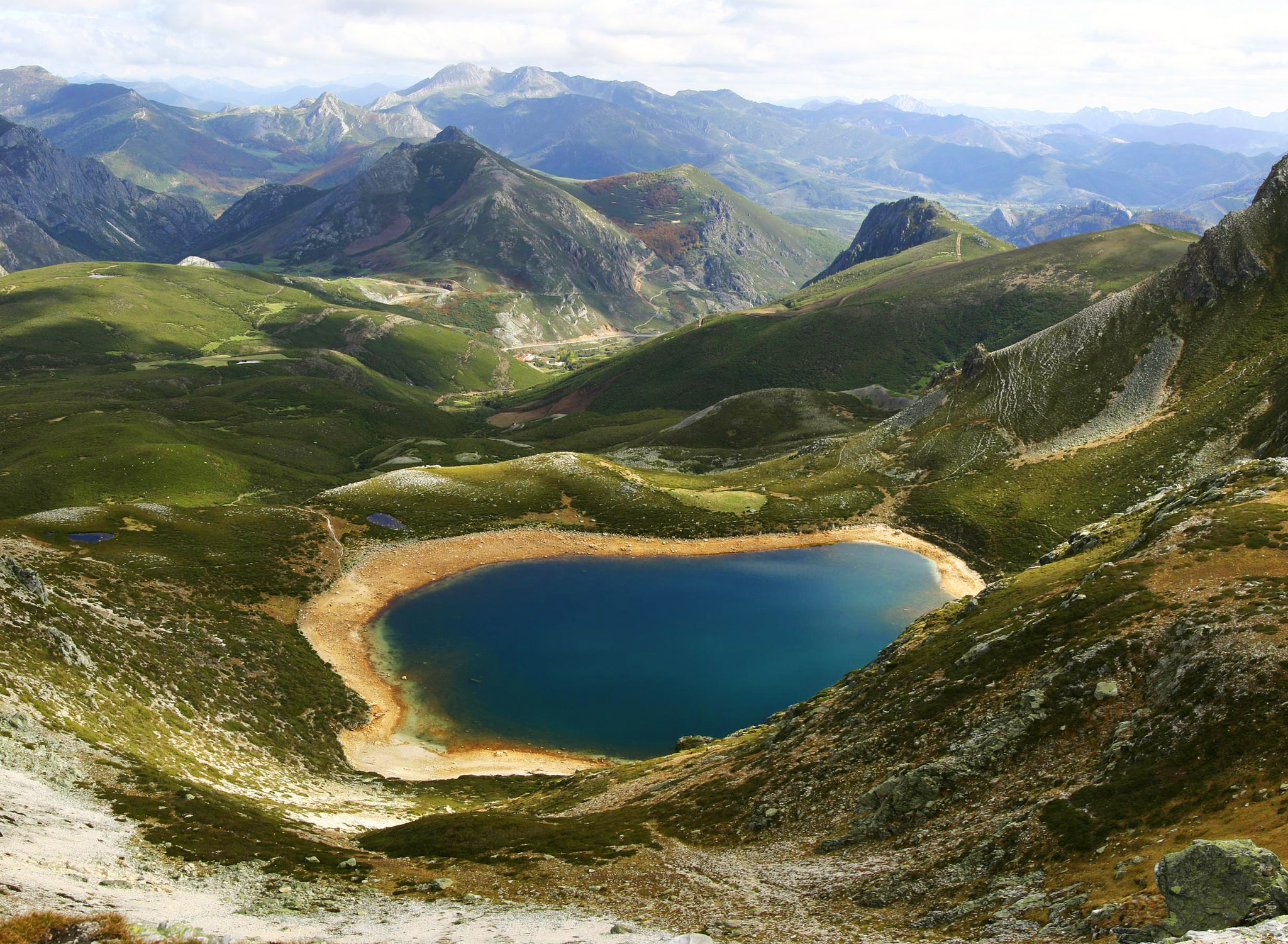
Lago del Ausente

The closest town to the resort is Isoba, in the municipality of Puebla de Lillo. The head of the municipality, with the same name, is a mountain village of 709 inhabitants (INE 2008), where the influence of the winter resort is reflected since the village has a large number of services, created as a result of the resort and designed to meet the needs of its users. The village stands out for its medieval tower, dating from the 14th century, which has had several uses: first as a defensive tower of the valley, a function it performed until 1913 when it became the town hall of the municipality of León. It is currently the Nature Interpretation Center of the Regional Park of Picos de Europa.

Other attractions offered by the area, an alternative to skiing, are the glacial lakes of Ausente and Isoba, the latter also called Presente. The former is located near the resort and will be the endpoint of the first cross-country trail that the resort will have, while the latter is located near the village of Isoba, next to the LE-332 road.

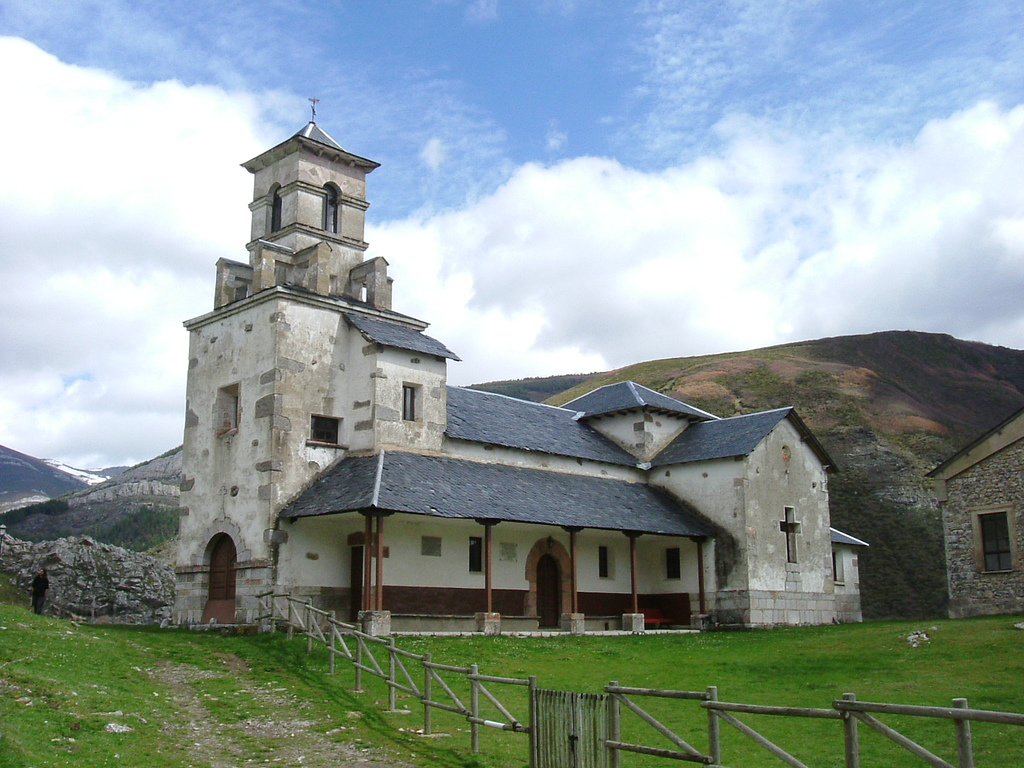
Lugueros Church

According to popular legend, the lake of Isoba was formed when a pilgrim on his way to El Salvador tried in vain to find shelter in the village of Isoba, being received only by the priest and the sinner of the village, whose sin was to be the unmarried mother of the religious. Seeing this situation, the pilgrim launched his proclamation of "Let Isoba sink, except the priest's house and that of the sinner!", before which water began to flow until the village was completely buried by the waters of the new lake, except for the houses of the priest and the sinner.

Lago del Ausente also has its own legend, which is about an old Avara woman who lived in a village nestled among rocks. Because of her selfishness, the inhabitants of the village abandoned it, leaving the old woman there alone. One day, a snowstorm surprised her and, without her being able to flee, the village was buried. It is said that on winter nights you can still hear the cries of the old woman who will live forever at the bottom of the Ausente Lake.

On this slope is also the Porma reservoir, an artificial lake created in 1968 after flooding the valley where Vegamián, the former county seat of the area, was located. It is the second reservoir in the province of León, after that of Riaño. The reservoir, which is an important tourist attraction for the area, hosts several nautical competitions. Next to it is the Valdehuesa Wildlife Museum, recently opened and which has a large collection of stuffed animals from all over the world.

=== Curueño River ===
The Curueño slope is home to the villages of the municipality of Valdelugueros, which, since the opening of the access to the station through Riopinos in 2002, has turned the valley into the shortest route from the capital, initiating a process of transformation of its economy from livestock farming to tourism. This can be seen in the increasing number of tourist establishments, among which the rural houses stand out, both in terms of quantity and number of places offered, and the rehabilitation of the numerous abandoned buildings.

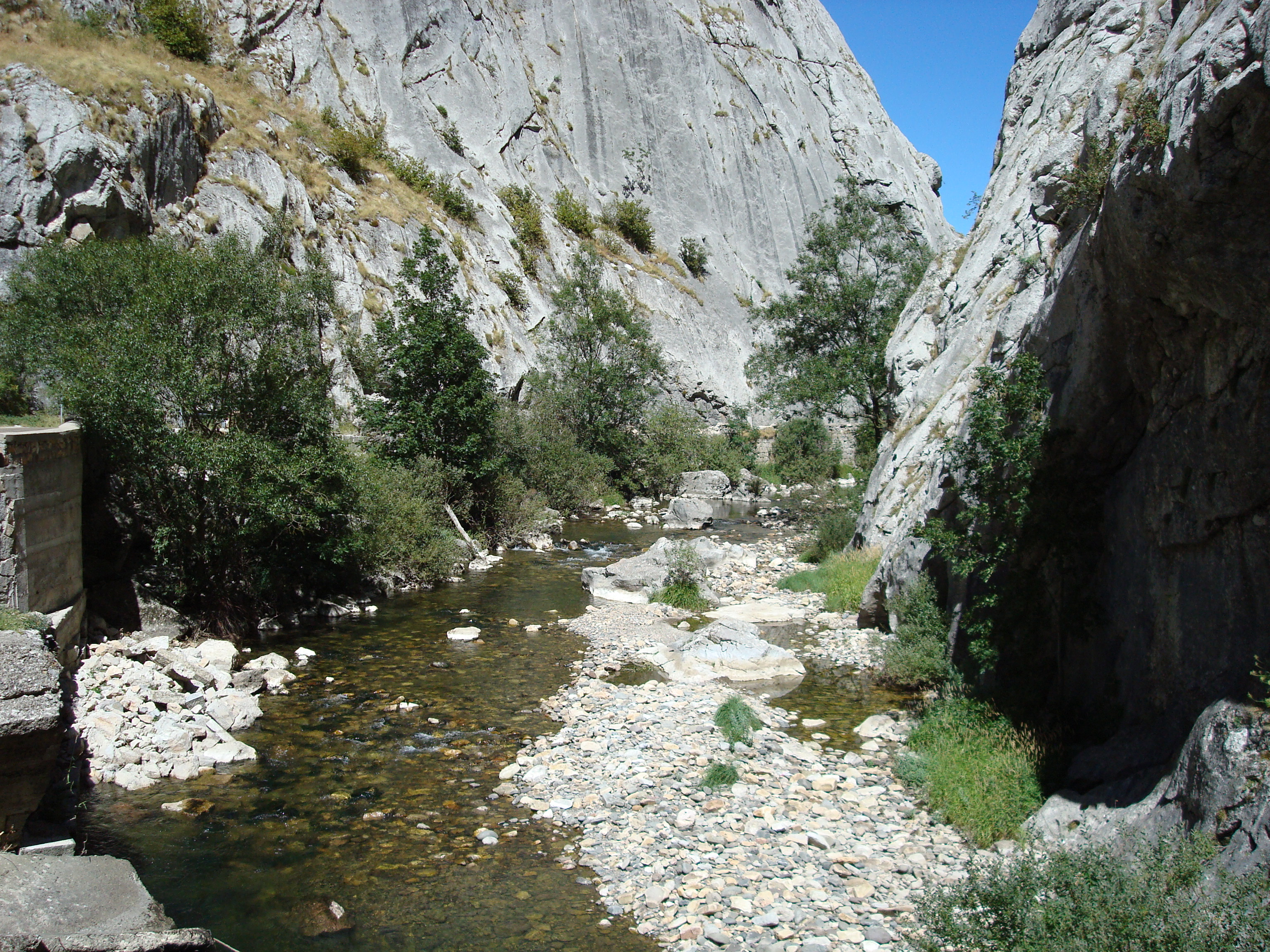
Hoces de Vergacervera

The valley, due to its particular isolation, has managed to preserve the traditional rural aspect of the Leonese mountains, and its villages frame its attractiveness with a valley such as the Curueño River, which flows between the crags and is saved by arched bridges such as Lugueros or Cerrulleda, Roman and medieval legacy of the Vegarada road that crossed these valleys.

Halfway between the provincial capital and the station are also the caves of Valporquero and the Hoces de Vegacervera.

== See also ==
- Leitariegos
- El Morredero
- Fuentes de Invierno

== Bibliography ==
- Serrano, Secundino; et al. (Team Director) (1991). Enciclopedia de León Volumen II. La Crónica de León. ISBN 8492055758.
- Several authors (1996). La Provincia de León. La Crónica 16 de León. ISBN 8486238536.
- Matias, Diez Alonso (1994). Mitos y Leyendas. Diario de León.
