= Catalina García González =

Spanish bus driver (1888–1959)

- Born: 1888; Puebla de Lillo, Castile and León, Spain
- Died: 1959 (aged 70–71); Puebla de Lillo, Castile and León, Spain
- Occupation: Bus driver
- Years active: 1925–1958
- Known for: First Spanish woman to obtain a driving licence
- Children: 6

Catalina García González (1888–1959) was a Spanish woman who was the first woman in Spain to obtain a driving licence in 1925, as well as the country's first female bus driver. She went on to establish the first bus line between Cofiñal and Boñar, which she had initially established in 1908 using a horse-drawn carriage.

== Biography ==
García González was born in 1888 in Puebla de Lillo, León. She was the youngest of four children born to Baltasar García, a civil guard from Rioseco de Tapia, and Juliana González, a housewife from Puebla de Lillo.

In 1902, at the age of 14, García González began working for her family, using a horse to unload shipments of trout to be transported from La Robla to Madrid. In 1925, García González became the first woman in Spain to obtain a driving licence. At that time, women required permission from their husbands, as well as a certificate of good conduct from the mayor of their town of residence, in order to request a licence, following a royal decree issued in 1918.

García González was the mother of six children and ran an inn, Casa Catalina, which primarily accommodated workers from the San Andrés talc mines, where her husband also worked. She died in 1959.

== Driving career ==
In 1908, García González established a transport service between Cofiñal, Puebla de Lillo and Boñar, which she initially operated using a horse-drawn carriage with capacity for four to five passengers. García González started the journey in the morning, returning in the afternoon.

In 1925, García González obtained a driving licence, and started driving a Ford Model T, which had been purchased second-hand by her husband in 1922. She subsequently bought a Hispano Suiza, which enabled her to use this to transport passengers, replacing her carriage. García González was able to obtain a concession to establish a bus route to Boñar on the basis that she agreed to act as a postwoman, without pay, to 21 communities she would pass through on the route, which traversed the municipalities of Puebla de Lillo, Vegamián, Reyero and Boñar. Her bus made four trips a day. García González had fought to obtain the concession against more experienced competitors, and had initially been unsuccessful when the concession was first offered to the company Empresa Fernández.

In 1935, García González's bus line company was visited by representatives from the Ministry of Finance, which authorised that it was compliant with regulations, which granted García González the right to receive monthly payments from stamps on tickets and concessions.

In 1958, García González sold her bus company to Francisco López Alba. Following this, locals were reported to still refer to the bus as "el bus de Catalina" (lit. 'Catalina's bus').

== Recognition ==
García González has been recognised a pioneering woman in the automobile industry. alongside Sophie Opel, Bertha Benz, Dorothy Levitt and Camille du Gast.

Isaías Lafuente described García González as bringing progress to women's rights, particularly in eastern León where she lived and worked, due to her prominence as a local businesswoman who operated both the local bus line and a popular inn.

The city of León has proposed renaming a street in tribute to García González.
