= A Braña =

- Parish
- Location within Spain
- Country: Spain
- Autonomous community: Principado de Asturias
- Province: Province of Asturias
- Municipality: Valdelugueros

A Braña is a town in the Valdelugueros municipality, within the province and autonomous community of Asturias, in northern Spain.

The population is 255 (INE 2007).

== Villages and hamlets ==
- Bargaz
- A Braña
- El Caroceiro
- El Chao das Trabas
- Grandamarina
- Mendóis
- Mercadeiros
- Penadecabras
- Romeye
- Villarín
