= Iván Santos (cyclist) =

Spanish cyclist

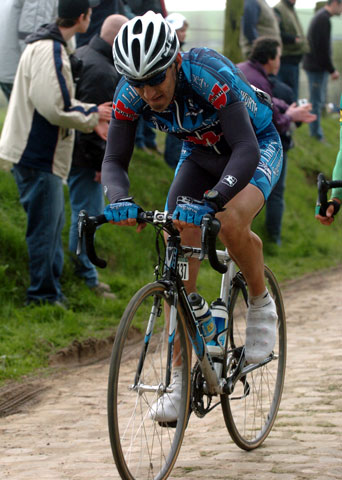

Personal information
- Born: 18 February 1982 (age 44) Puebla de Lillo, Spain
- Height: 1.76 m (5 ft 9 in)
- Weight: 76 kg (168 lb)

Cycling career
- Sport: Cycling
- Current team: Retired
- Discipline: Road
- Role: Rider

Professional team
- 2005–2006: Liberty Seguros–Würth

Iván Santos Martinez (born 18 February 1982) is a Spanish former racing cyclist. Santos rode for one professional team, Liberty Seguros–Würth, for his entire career.

== Major results ==
2003
1st Stage 1 Vuelta a Extremadura (TTT)
2004
1st Overall Vuelta al Bidasoa

1st Stage 2
