= Barrio de las Ollas =

- Locality
- Location within Province of León Location within Castile and León Location within Spain
- Coordinates: 42°51′56″N 5°20′16″W
- Country: Spain
- Autonomous community: Castile and León
- Province: Province of León
- Municipality: Boñar
- Elevation: 1,007 m (3,304 ft)

Population
  - Total: 35

Barrio de las Ollas is a locality located in the municipality of Boñar, in the province of León, Castile and León, Spain. As of 2020, it has a population of 35.

== Geography ==
Barrio de las Ollas is located 49km north-northeast of León, Spain.
