= Valdecastillo =

- Locality
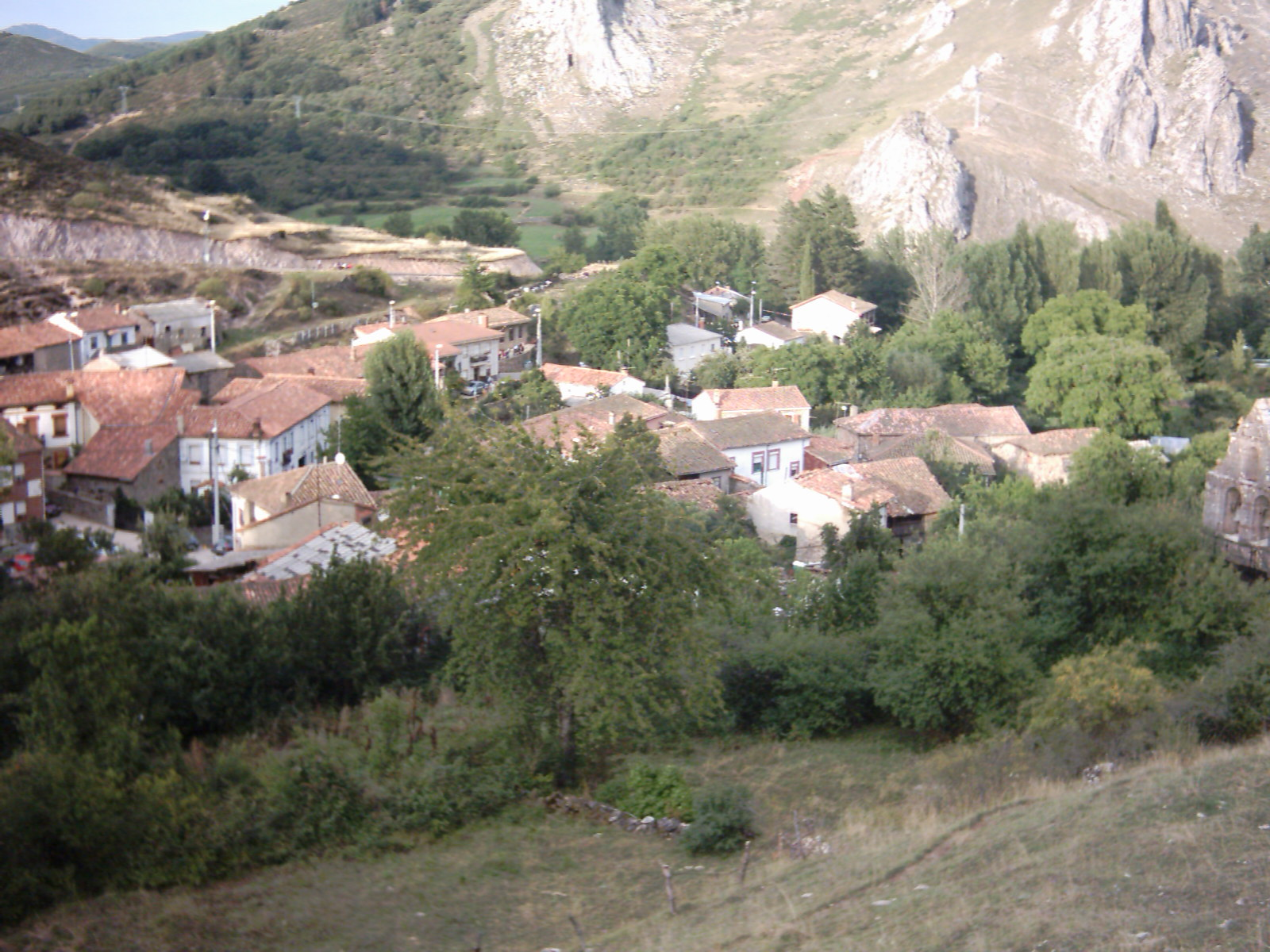

- Location within Province of León Location within Castile and León Location within Spain
- Coordinates: 42°54′30″N 5°18′55″W
- Country: Spain
- Autonomous community: Castile and León
- Province: Province of León
- Municipality: Boñar
- Elevation: 1,043 m (3,422 ft)

Population
  - Total: 23

Valdecastillo is a locality located in the municipality of Boñar, in the province of León, Castile and León, Spain. As of 2020, it has a population of 23.

== Geography ==
Valdecastillo is located 53km north-northeast of León, Spain.
