= Genicera =

Human settlement in Cármenes, León Province, Castile and León, Spain

Coordinates: 42.9526°N 5.4940°W

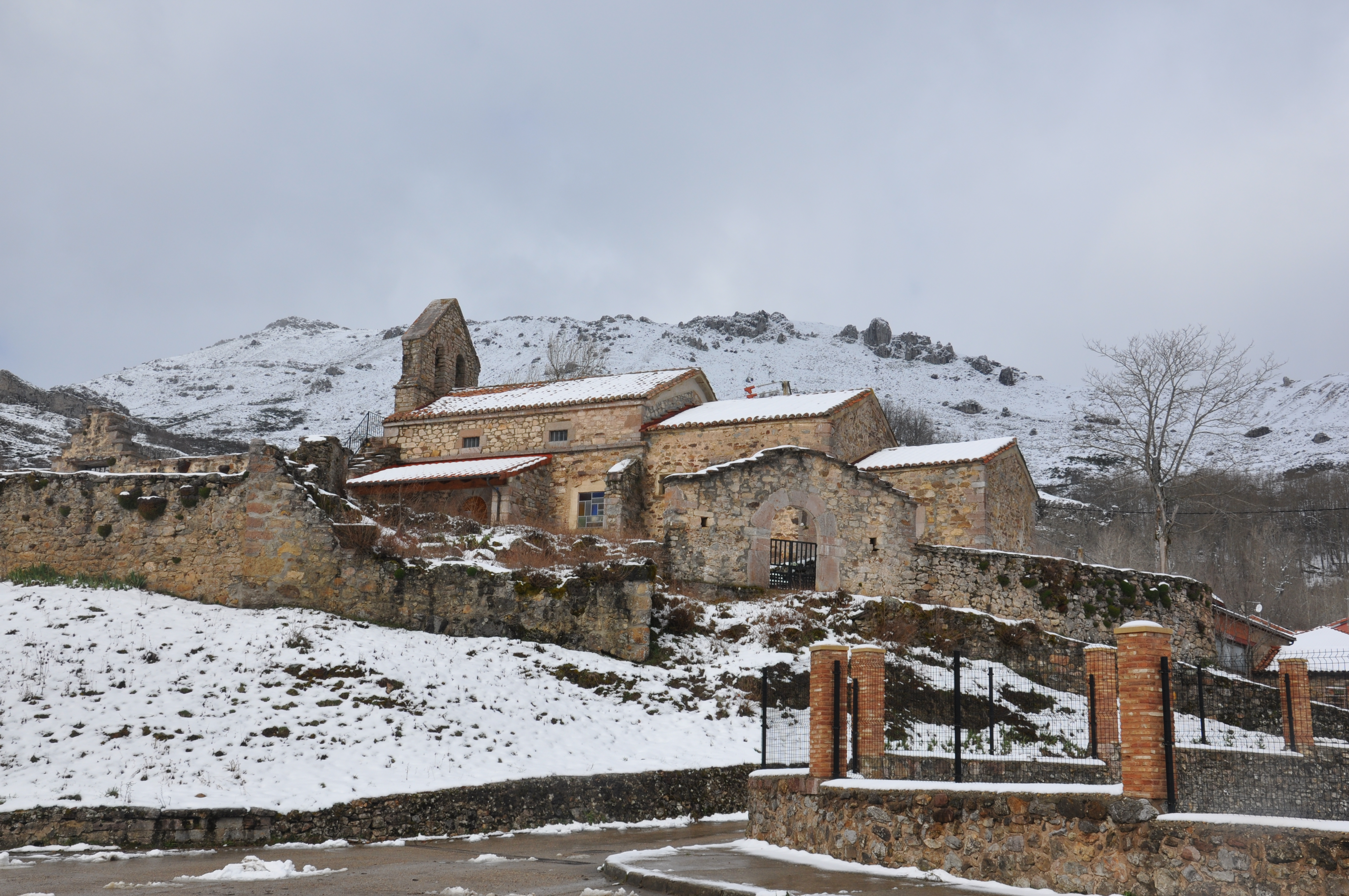
Church in Genicera dedicated to Saint Thomas

Genicera is a settlement in Cármenes, León Province, Castile and León, Spain.

The patron saint of Genicera is Thomas the Apostle.

Genicera is near a crag that is popular with rock climbers.
