= Colle (Boñar) =

- Locality
- Location within Province of León Location within Castile and León Location within Spain
- Coordinates: 42°50′26″N 5°15′5″W
- Country: Spain
- Autonomous community: Castile and León
- Province: Province of León
- Municipality: Boñar
- Elevation: 1,071 m (3,514 ft)

Population
  - Total: 39

Colle is a locality located in the municipality of Boñar, in the province of León, Castile and León, Spain. As of 2020, it has a population of 39.

== Geography ==
Colle is located 53km northeast of León, Spain.
