= Llama (Boñar) =

- Locality
- Location within Province of León Location within Castile and León Location within Spain
- Coordinates: 42°50′17″N 5°15′8″W
- Country: Spain
- Autonomous community: Castile and León
- Province: Province of León
- Municipality: Boñar
- Elevation: 1,064 m (3,491 ft)

Population
  - Total: 64

Llama is a locality located in the municipality of Boñar, in the province of León, Castile and León, Spain. As of 2020, it has a population of 64.

== Geography ==
Llama is located 53km northeast of León, Spain.
