= Poblado del Pantano del Porma =

- Locality
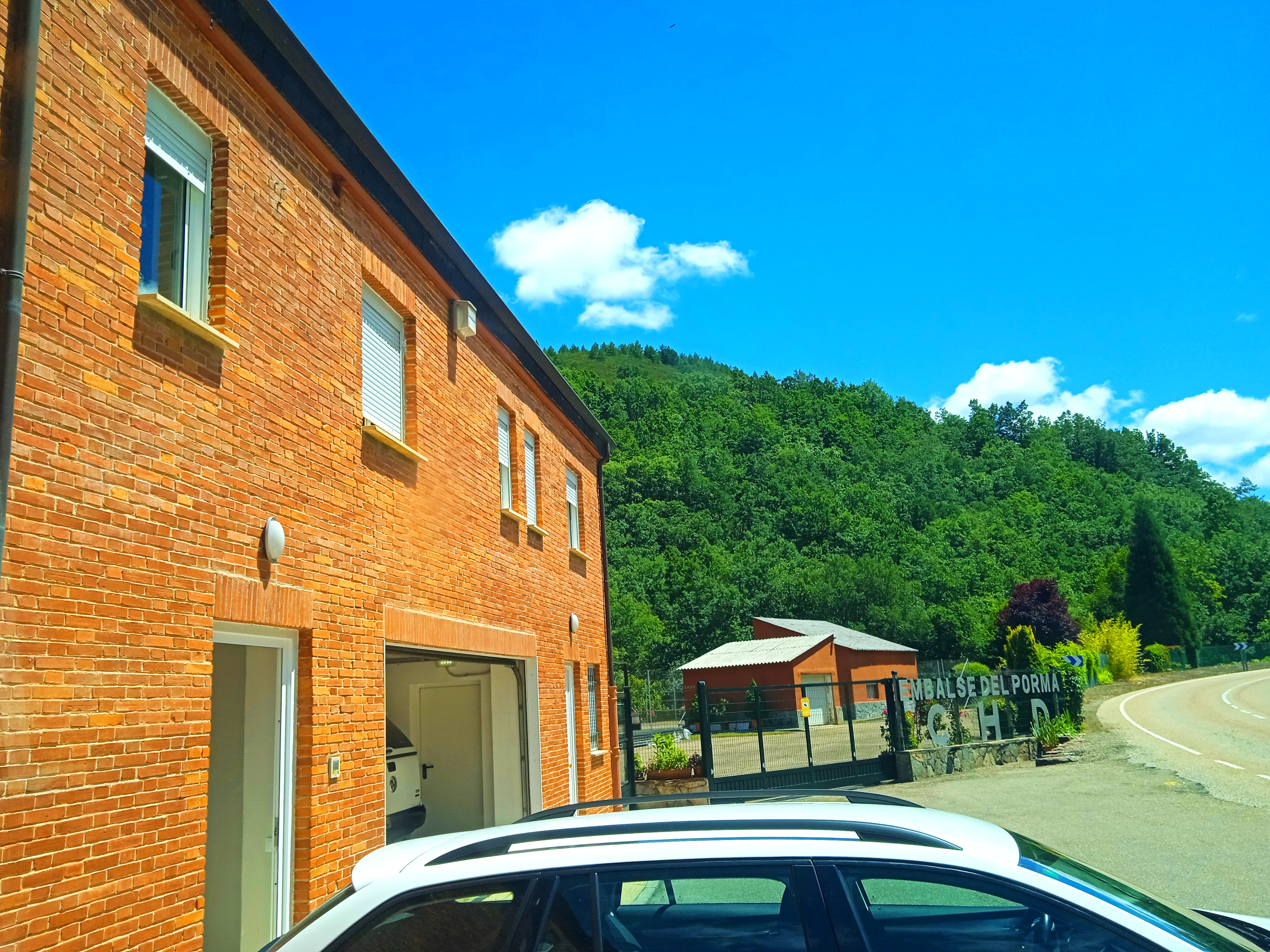
- View of the town from the road LE-331

- Location within Province of León Location within Castile and León Location within Spain
- Coordinates: 42°55′23″N 5°17′49″W
- Country: Spain
- Autonomous community: Castile and León
- Province: Province of León
- Municipality: Boñar
- Elevation: 1,027 m (3,369 ft)

Population
  - Total: 3

Poblado del Pantano del Porma is a locality located in the municipality of Boñar, in the province of León, Castile and León, Spain. As of 2020, it has a population of 3.

== Geography ==
Poblado del Pantano del Porma is located 55km north-northeast of León, Spain.
