= Rucayo =

- Locality
- Location within Province of León Location within Castile and León Location within Spain
- Coordinates: 42°58′2″N 5°19′12″W
- Country: Spain
- Autonomous community: Castile and León
- Province: Province of León
- Municipality: Boñar
- Elevation: 1,124 m (3,688 ft)

Population
  - Total: 33

Rucayo is a hamlet located in the municipality of Boñar, in the province of León, Castile and León, Spain. As of 2020, it has a population of 33.

== Geography ==
Rucayo is located 65km north-northeast of León, Spain.
