= Las Bodas =

- Locality
- Location within Province of León Location within Castile and León Location within Spain
- Coordinates: 42°50′45″N 5°17′48″W
- Country: Spain
- Autonomous community: Castile and León
- Province: Province of León
- Municipality: Boñar
- Elevation: 993 m (3,258 ft)

Population
  - Total: 30

Las Bodas is a hamlet located in the municipality of Boñar, in the province of León, Castile and León, Spain. As of 2020, it has a population of 30.

== Geography ==
Las Bodas is located 48km northeast of León, Spain.
