= Adrados (Boñar) =

- Locality
- Location within Province of León Location within Castile and León Location within Spain
- Coordinates: 42°52′36″N 5°16′59″W
- Country: Spain
- Autonomous community: Castile and León
- Province: Province of León
- Municipality: Boñar
- Elevation: 1,156 m (3,793 ft)

Population
  - Total: 16

Adrados is a locality located in the municipality of Boñar, in the province of León, Castile and León, Spain. As of 2020, it has a population of 16.

== Geography ==
Adrados is located 51km northeast of León, Spain.
