= Remellán =

- Locality
- Location within Province of León Location within Castile and León Location within Spain
- Coordinates: 42°53′57″N 5°18′52″W
- Country: Spain
- Autonomous community: Castile and León
- Province: Province of León
- Municipality: Boñar
- Elevation: 1,002 m (3,287 ft)

Population
  - Total: 2

Remellán is a locality located in the municipality of Boñar, in the province of León, Castile and León, Spain. As of 2020, it has a population of 2.

== Geography ==
Remellán is located 52km north-northeast of León, Spain.
