= Grandoso =

- Locality
- Location within Province of León Location within Castile and León Location within Spain
- Coordinates: 42°51′2″N 5°16′33″W
- Country: Spain
- Autonomous community: Castile and León
- Province: Province of León
- Municipality: Boñar
- Elevation: 1,075 m (3,527 ft)

Population
  - Total: 40

Grandoso is a locality located in the municipality of Boñar, in the province of León, Castile and León, Spain. As of 2020, it has a population of 40.

== Geography ==
Grandoso is located 51 km (36.7 mi) northeast of León, Spain.
