= Voznuevo =

- Locality
- Location within Province of León Location within Castile and León Location within Spain
- Coordinates: 42°51′42″N 5°17′36″W
- Country: Spain
- Autonomous community: Castile and León
- Province: Province of León
- Municipality: Boñar
- Elevation: 1,064 m (3,491 ft)

Population
  - Total: 52

Voznuevo is a locality located in the municipality of Boñar, in the province of León, Castile and León, Spain. As of 2020, it has a population of 52.

== Geography ==
Voznuevo is located 50km northeast of León, Spain.
