= Vozmediano (Boñar) =

- Locality
- Location within Province of León Location within Castile and León Location within Spain
- Coordinates: 42°52′31″N 5°13′41″W
- Country: Spain
- Autonomous community: Castile and León
- Province: Province of León
- Municipality: Boñar
- Elevation: 1,233 m (4,045 ft)

Population
  - Total: 16

Vozmediano is a locality located in the municipality of Boñar, in the province of León, Castile and León, Spain. As of 2020, it has a population of 16.

== Geography ==
Vozmediano is located 58km northeast of León, Spain.
