= Cerecedo (Boñar) =

- Locality
- Location within Province of León Location within Castile and León Location within Spain
- Coordinates: 42°53′13″N 5°18′20″W
- Country: Spain
- Autonomous community: Castile and León
- Province: Province of León
- Municipality: Boñar
- Elevation: 995 m (3,264 ft)

Population
  - Total: 15

Cerecedo is a hamlet located in the municipality of Boñar, in the province of León, Castile and León, Spain. As of 2020, it has a population of 15.

== Geography ==
Cerecedo is located 50km north-northeast of León, Spain.
