= Felechas (Boñar) =

- Locality
- Location within Province of León Location within Castile and León Location within Spain
- Coordinates: 42°50′48″N 5°14′3″W
- Country: Spain
- Autonomous community: Castile and León
- Province: Province of León
- Municipality: Boñar
- Elevation: 1,147 m (3,763 ft)

Population
  - Total: 36

Felechas is a locality located in the municipality of Boñar, in the province of León, Castile and León, Spain. As of 2020, it has a population of 36.

== Geography ==
Felechas is located 55km northeast of León, Spain.
