= Orones =

- Locality
- Location within Province of León Location within Castile and León Location within Spain
- Coordinates: 42°57′48″N 5°14′13″W
- Country: Spain
- Autonomous community: Castile and León
- Province: Province of León
- Municipality: Boñar
- Elevation: 1,145 m (3,757 ft)

Population
  - Total: 15

Orones is a hamlet located in the municipality of Boñar, in the province of León, Castile and León, Spain. As of 2020, it has a population of 15.

== Geography ==
Orones is located 67km north-northeast of León, Spain.
