= Cármenes =

Cármenes, Spain
- municipality
- Flag Coat of arms

- Location within Spain
- Coordinates: 42°57′32″N 5°34′28″W
- Country: Spain
- Autonomous community: Castile and León
- Province: León
- Municipality: Cármenes

Government
  - Mayor: Gonzalo González Martínez (PSOE)

Area
  - Total: 154.22 km^{2} (59.54 sq mi)
- Elevation: 1,167 m (3,829 ft)

Population (2025-01-01)
  - Total: 356
  - Density: 2.31/km^{2} (5.98/sq mi)
- Demonym: carmeniense
- Time zone: UTC+1 (CET)
  - Summer (DST): UTC+2 (CEST)
- Postal Code: 24838
- Telephone prefix: 987
- Website: Ayto. de Cármenes

Cármenes (Spanish pronunciation: [ˈkaɾmenes]) is a municipality located in the province of León, Castile and León, Spain. At the 2011 census (INE), the municipality had a population of 448 inhabitants.

Genicera, to the east of the municipality, has been described as the "heart of the Argüellos".
