= Leitariegos (Narcea) =

- Parish
- Location within Spain
- Coordinates: 43°N 6.416667°W
- Country: Spain
- Autonomous community: Asturias
- Province: Asturias
- Municipality: Cangas del Narcea

Leitariegos (variant: Puerto de Leitariegos) is one of 54 parish councils in Cangas del Narcea, a municipality within the province and autonomous community of Asturias, in northern Spain.

== Villages ==
- Brañas d'Abaxu
- Brañas d'Arriba
- La Venta la Farruquita
- La Pachalina
- El Puertu
- Trescastru
