= Valdehuesa =

- Locality
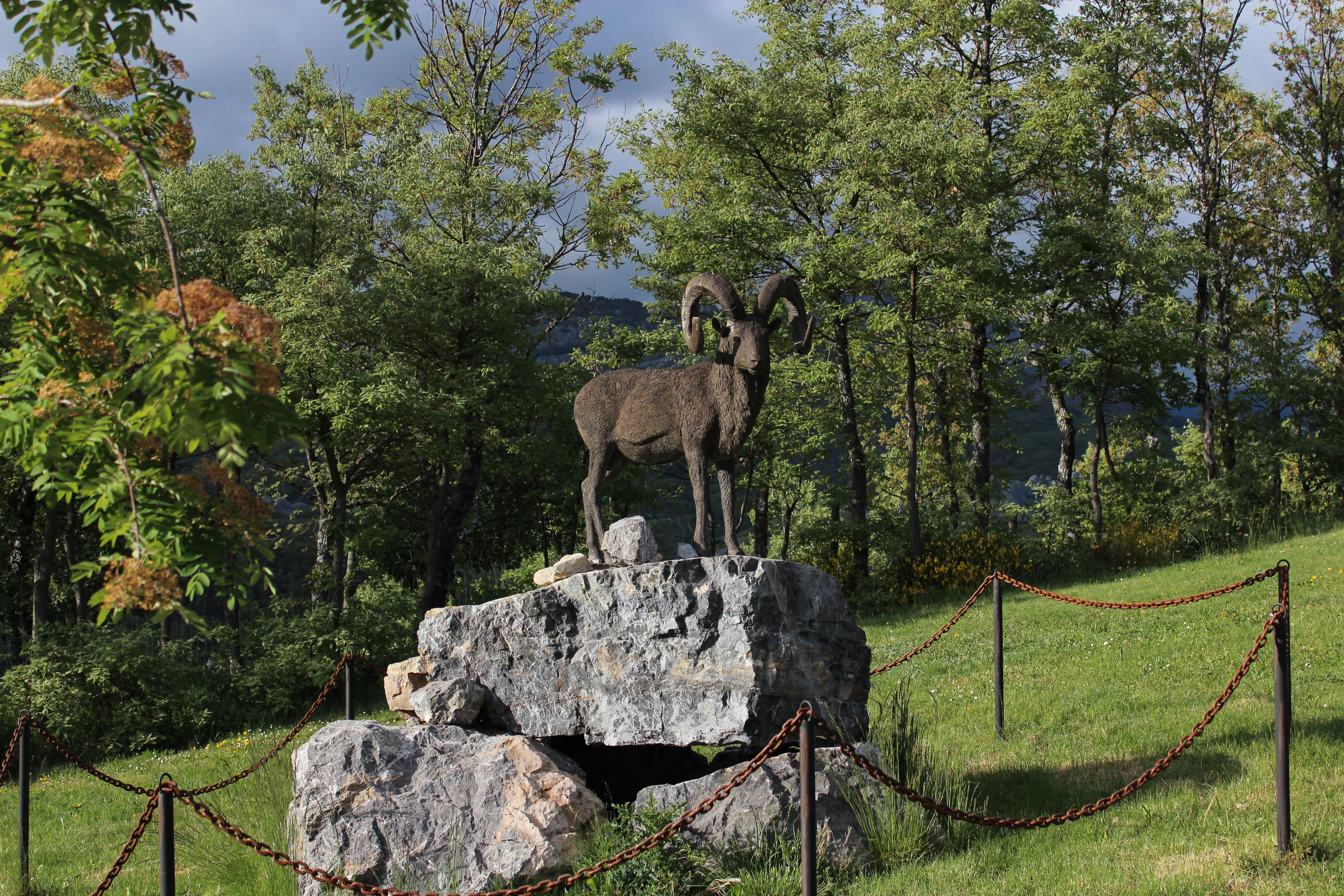

- Location within Province of León Location within Castile and León Location within Spain
- Coordinates: 42°56′10″N 5°19′41″W
- Country: Spain
- Autonomous community: Castile and León
- Province: Province of León
- Municipality: Boñar
- Elevation: 1,134 m (3,720 ft)

Population
  - Total: 19

Valdehuesa is a locality located in the municipality of Boñar, in the province of León, Castile and León, Spain. As of 2020, it has a population of 19.

== Geography ==
Valdehuesa is located 58km north-northeast of León, Spain.
