= Puebla de Lillo =

Coordinates: 43°00′N 5°16′W

Puebla de Lillo, Spain
- municipality
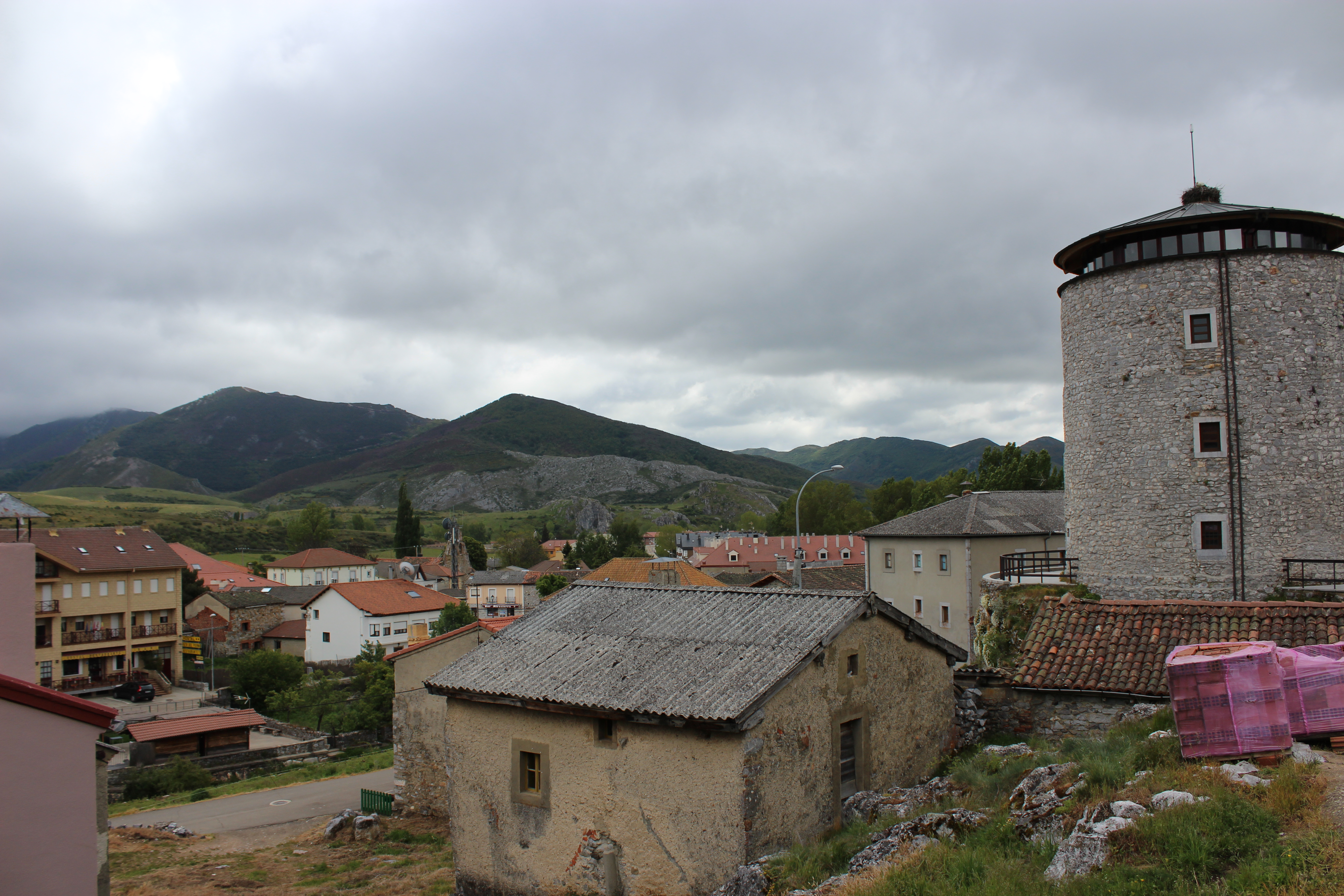
- View of Puebla de Lillo

- Flag Coat of arms
- Interactive map of Puebla de Lillo, Spain
- Country: Spain
- Autonomous community: Castile and León
- Province: León
- Municipality: Puebla de Lillo

Area
  - Total: 171 km^{2} (66 sq mi)

Population (2025-01-01)
  - Total: 641
  - Density: 3.75/km^{2} (9.71/sq mi)
- Time zone: UTC+1 (CET)
  - Summer (DST): UTC+2 (CEST)

Puebla de Lillo is a municipality located in the province of León, Castile and León, Spain. According to the 2004 census (INE), the municipality has a population of 696 inhabitants.

== Notable residents ==
- Catalina García González – the first woman in Spain to obtain a driving licence, who ran a successful bus line connecting Puebla de Lillo to Boñar.
