= Rioseco de Tapia =

Coordinates: 42°44′N 5°47′W

Rioseco de Tapia, Spain
- municipality
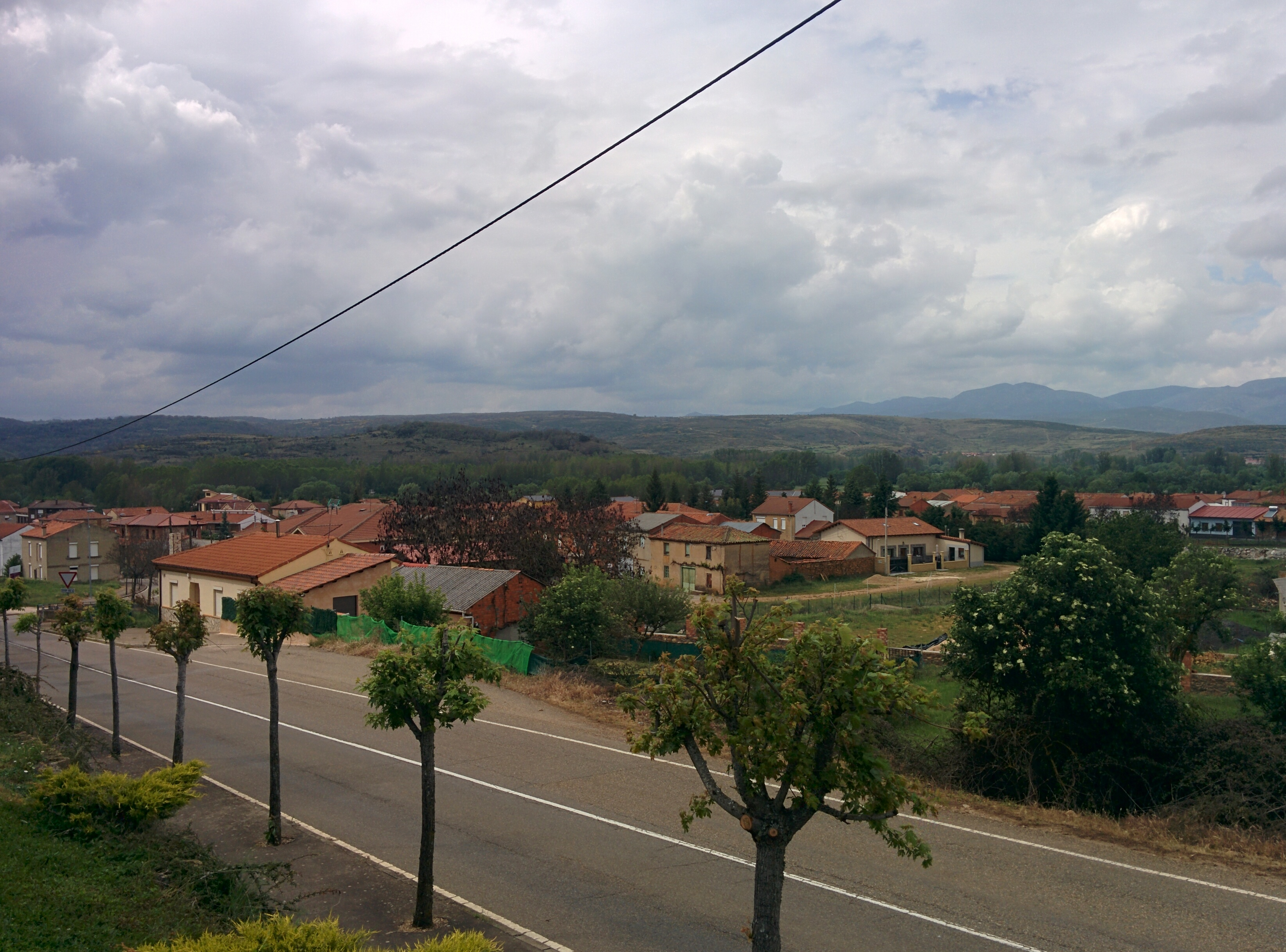
- General view of Rioseco de Tapia

- Coat of arms
- Interactive map of Rioseco de Tapia, Spain
- Country: Spain
- Autonomous community: Castile and León
- Province: León
- Municipality: Rioseco de Tapia

Area
  - Total: 71 km^{2} (27 sq mi)

Population (2025-01-01)
  - Total: 409
  - Density: 5.8/km^{2} (15/sq mi)
- Time zone: UTC+1 (CET)
  - Summer (DST): UTC+2 (CEST)

Rioseco de Tapia is a municipality located in the province of León, Castile and León, Spain. According to the 2004 census (INE), the municipality has a population of 504 inhabitants.
