= Valdelugueros =

Valdelugueros, Spain
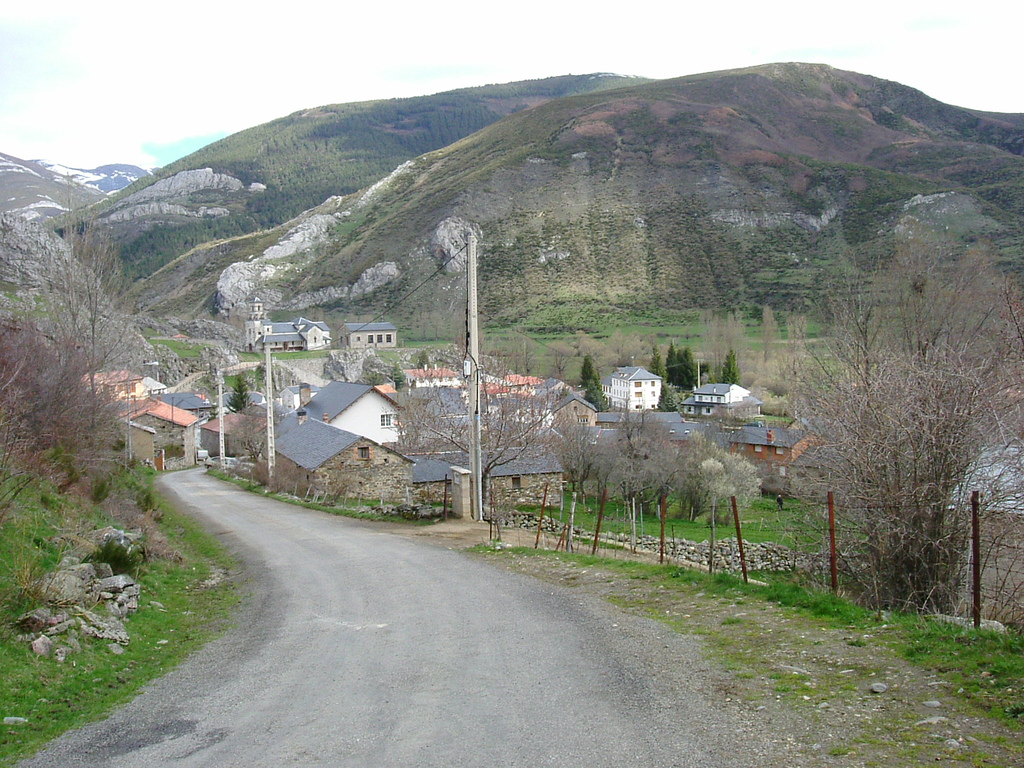

- Flag Coat of arms

- Location in Spain
- Coordinates: 42.9719°N 5.4117°W
- Country: Spain
- Autonomous community: Castile and León
- Province: León
- Municipality: Valdelugueros

Area
  - Total: 143 km^{2} (55 sq mi)

Population (2025-01-01)
  - Total: 484
  - Density: 3.38/km^{2} (8.77/sq mi)
- Time zone: UTC+1 (CET)
  - Summer (DST): UTC+2 (CEST)

Valdelugueros is a municipality located in the province of León, Castile and León, Spain. According to the 2004 census (INE), the municipality has a population of 467 inhabitants.
