= Boñar =

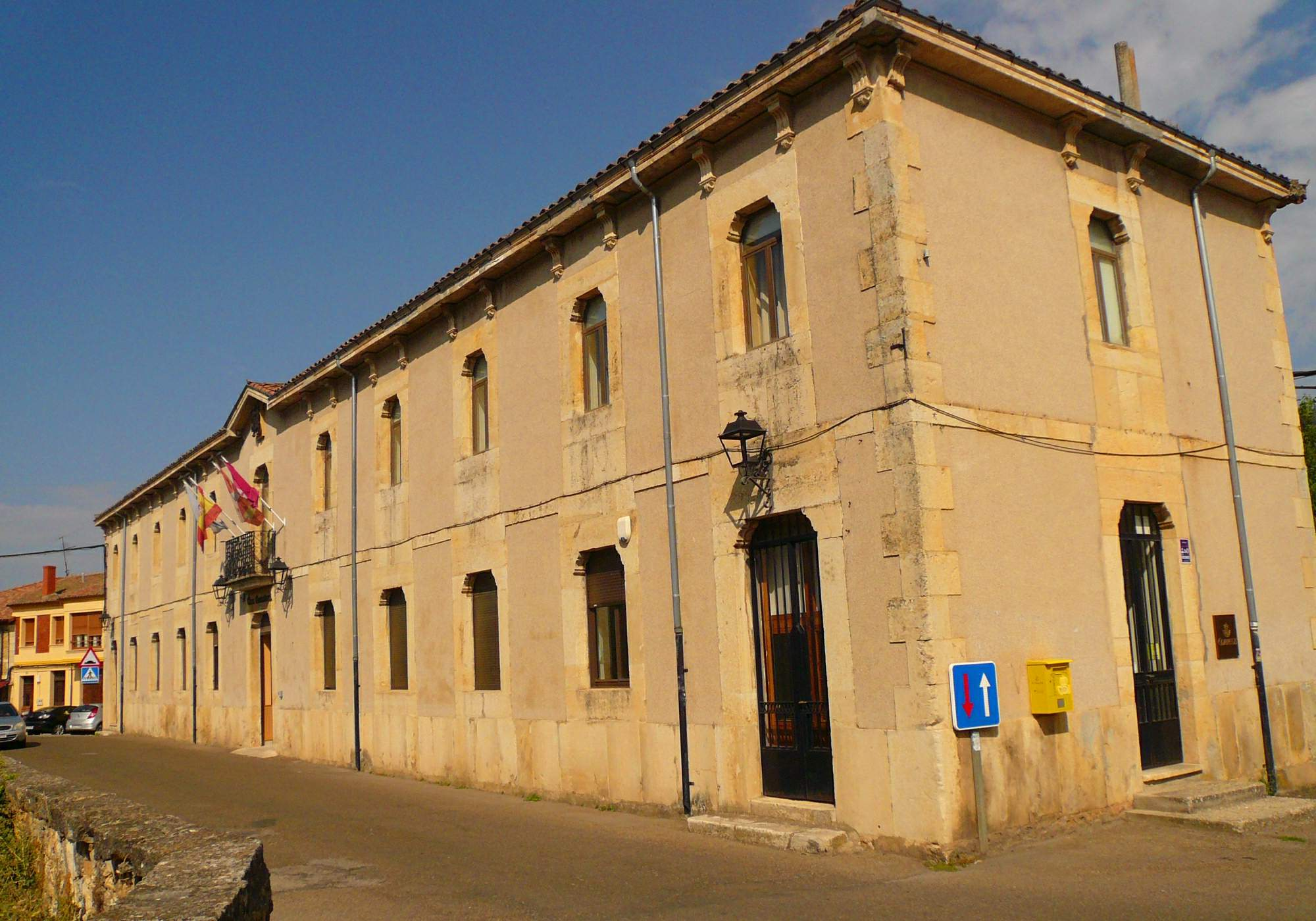
- Town hall

- Coat of arms

- Location within Spain
- Coordinates: 42°52′0″N 5°19′22″W
- Country: Spain
- Autonomous community: Castile and León
- Province: León
- Municipality: Boñar

Government
  - Mayor: Pepe Villa Sáez (PSOE)

Area
  - Total: 180.62 km^{2} (69.74 sq mi)
- Elevation: 972 m (3,189 ft)

Population (2025-01-01)
  - Total: 1,732
  - Density: 9.589/km^{2} (24.84/sq mi)
- Demonym: boñarense
- Time zone: UTC+1 (CET)
  - Summer (DST): UTC+2 (CEST)
- Postal Code: 24850
- Telephone prefix: 987
- Website: Boñar

The municipality of Boñar (Spanish pronunciation: [boˈɲaɾ]) is located in the province of León, Castile and León, Spain. As per the 2010 census (INE), the municipality has a population of 2,085 inhabitants with almost all of the residents living in the main town of Boñar. In addition to Boñar, the municipality includes the villages of Adrados, Barrio de las Ollas, Las Bodas, Cerecedo, Colle, Llama, Felechas, Grandoso, Orones, Oville, Poblado del Pantano, Remellán, Rucayo, Valdecastillo, Valdehuesa, La Vega de Boñar, Veneros, Vozmediano, and Voznuevo. Most surrounding villages in the municipality of Boñar have between 10 and 30 permanent residents, but some of the larger villages have up to 250 villagers.

== The Town of Boñar ==
Boñar, a typically tranquil town, experiences a surge in population during summer. It serves as a favored getaway for northern Spaniards seeking refuge from bustling coastal cities. Many own summer homes there and revisit annually, drawn to the rural setting ideal for outdoor activities.

A popular way to spend daytime hours in Boñar is at El Soto. El Soto is a large municipal park with a snack bar, swimming pool, camping, ball fields, tennis courts and the river Porma for boating and fishing. The nature preserve the Parque Regional de los Picos de Europa is also a popular destination for enjoying outdoor activities. In spring and summer, the pine and deciduous forests in the mountains throughout the region are destinations for hiking and exploring. In winter, skiing and other winter sports are popular activities.

Visited by locals and tourists is the reservoir the Pantano de Vegamián. The creation of the reservoir in 1968 necessitated the submersion of six small villages with dwindling populations. The towns were disincorporated and evacuated. Visitors to the Pantano de Vegamián go not only to observe the natural environment of the reservoir, but also to catch a glimpse of the villages below the surface which can be discerned due to the water's clarity. In addition to offering an interesting panorama, the reservoir is now an important source of water and electricity for much of León province. For some locals, however, it is a painful reminder of a lost past which will never be reclaimed.

Socializing, eating and drinking are a major part of daily life in Boñar. The evening stroll, the paseo, is also a component of social life in Boñar.

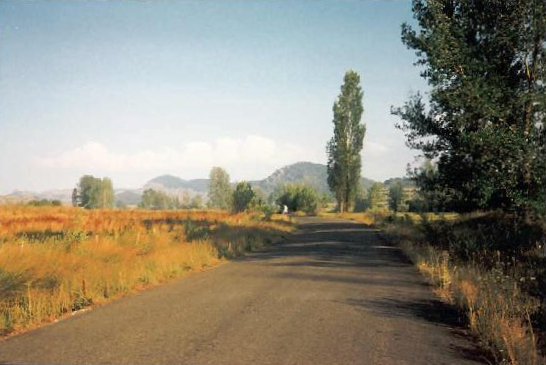
Rural outskirts of Boñar.

Young and old stroll around the town square, the Plaza del Negrillon or down the main street, the Avenida de la Constitución and surrounding streets exchanging greetings, light conversation, and stopping for a snack or drink before continuing on. The approximately 15 bars, cafes and restaurants in Boñar function as the arena for most of the community activities in the village.

Boñar holds three festivals in honor of Catholic saints. These festivals function as both religious and social events. All three events are centered on the Catholic Church, the Iglesia Parroquial de San Pedro de Boñar situated in the Plaza del Negrillon. Activities include religious services, parades, and an evening carnival with games, food vendors, a beer garden and live music. The festivals celebrated in Boñar are:

• June 29 – the Festival of Apostle Saint Peter, August 16 the Festival Saint Roch

• October 12 – the Festival of the Patron Saint Pilar which is also Hispanic Day the día de la Hispanidad.
