= María Juan Millet =

Spanish politician (born 1953)

Maria Celeste Juan Millet (1953 in Valencia, Spain) is a Spanish politician for the Spanish Socialist Workers' Party (PSOE).

After gaining a degree in Economic and Business Sciences, Juan joined the PSOE in 1974 at a time when membership was still illegal under Francoist Spain. At the 1986 General Election, she was elected to the Spanish Congress of Deputies representing Valencia Province and was re-elected in the subsequent elections in 1989 serving until 1993.

Aside from politics, she worked as a deputy director in the regional finance and tax inspectorate.
