= Juan Lloret Llorens =

Spanish politician (born 1952)

Juan Lloret Llorens (born 1952 in Valencia, Spain) is a Spanish politician for the Spanish Socialist Workers' Party (PSOE).

In his University days, Lloret was a member of the Black Flag (Bandera Negra), an anarchist organisation. After qualifying in law, he joined the PSOE in 1975, becoming a committee member the committee for the Valencian Community. He served as a councillor on Valencia City Council from 1983 to 1986, when he was elected to the Spanish Congress of Deputies representing Valencia Province. He was re-elected in the subsequent elections in 1989 but did not stand in 1993.
