= Ana María Yabar Sterling =

Spanish politician, author and academic

Ana María Yabar Sterling (Pamplona, Spain, September 7, 1948) is a Spanish politician, author and academic.

== Biography ==
Married, with three children, Yabar gained a doctorate in law from the University of Navarra in 1974 and in Economic Science from the Complutense University of Madrid in 1976. She joined the Liberal Party which in 1983 formed an electoral alliance with the Popular Alliance (AP) and the Democratic Popular Party (PDP). These three parties formed the People's Coalition for the 1986 elections and in that year Yabar was elected to the Spanish Congress of Deputies representing Valencia Province. In 1988, when the Liberal Party decided to merge with the PDP and AP to form the current People's Party, Yabar resigned from the Liberal party to sit as an independent in the mixed group in Congress before joining the Democratic and Social Centre (CDS). For the 1989 election Yabar contested Madrid Province. Placed fifth on the CDS list, in a district where the party had won five seats at the previous election, she was unsuccessful, as the party lost a seat. However, as first substitute, she became eligible to return to Congress when former Prime Minister and party leader Adolfo Suárez resigned his seat following poor results in the local elections earlier in the year. However, she declined the opportunity to take the seat.

In 2006, she was appointed Director of the University Institute of Environmental Sciences. Subsequently, she lectured in law at the Complutense University of Madrid.

== Selected published works ==
- El sector público en España: un análisis cuantitativo de política fiscal (1977)
- Un futuro para la economía española (1978)
- La actividad financiera de los municipios de Navarra (1979)
- Distribución funcional de la renta en España y en la Comunidad Económica Europea (1982)
- Cambio climático: planteamientos y análisis desde una prespectiva multidisciplinar (2005)
