= Opinion polling for the 1989 Spanish general election =

In the run up to the 1989 Spanish general election, various organisations carried out opinion polling to gauge voting intention in Spain during the term of the 3rd Cortes Generales. Results of such polls are displayed in this article. The date range for these opinion polls is from the previous general election, held on 22 June 1986, to the day the next election was held, on 29 October 1989.

Voting intention estimates refer mainly to a hypothetical Congress of Deputies election. Polls are listed in reverse chronological order, showing the most recent first and using the dates when the survey fieldwork was done, as opposed to the date of publication. Where the fieldwork dates are unknown, the date of publication is given instead. The highest percentage figure in each polling survey is displayed with its background shaded in the leading party's colour. If a tie ensues, this is applied to the figures with the highest percentages. The "Lead" columns on the right shows the percentage-point difference between the parties with the highest percentages in a poll.

== Electoral polling ==
=== Nationwide polling ===
==== Voting intention estimates ====
The table below lists nationwide voting intention estimates. Refusals are generally excluded from the party vote percentages, while question wording and the treatment of "don't know" responses and those not intending to vote may vary between polling organisations. When available, seat projections determined by the polling organisations are displayed below (or in place of) the percentages in a smaller font; 176 seats were required for an absolute majority in the Congress of Deputies.

Color key:

Exit poll

| Polling firm/Commissioner | Fieldwork date | Sample size | Turnout | PSOE | AP | CDS | CiU | IU | PNV | HB | EE | PA | UV | LV | EA | PP | ARM | Lead |
|---|---|---|---|---|---|---|---|---|---|---|---|---|---|---|---|---|---|---|
| 1989 general election | 29 Oct 1989 | —N/a | 69.7 | 39.6; 175 | (Note: Within PP.) | 7.9; 14 | 5.0; 18 | 9.1; 17 | 1.2; 5 | 1.1; 4 | 0.5; 2 | 1.0; 2 | 0.7; 2 | 0.8; 0 | 0.7; 2 | 25.8; 107 | 1.1; 0 | 13.8 |
| PSOE | 29 Oct 1989 | ? | 68 | 40.8; 173/176 | | 8.1; 12/14 | 5.2; 18 | 9.0; 18/20 | 1.3; 5 | 1.1; 4 | 0.6; 2 | 1.3; 2 | 0.5; 2 | – | 0.7; 1 | 24.0; 103/105 | – | 16.8 |
| Metis/RTVE | 29 Oct 1989 | 40,000 | ? | ? 177/180 | | ? 12/14 | ? 17/19 | ? 16/18 | ? 6 | ? 4/5 | ? 2 | ? 1 | ? 1 | ? 0 | ? 1 | ? 100/103 | ? 0 | ? |
| Opina | 29 Oct 1989 | ? | ? | ? 181/185 | | ? 6/7 | ? 18/19 | ? 22/25 | ? 5/6 | ? 5 | ? 2 | ? 1/2 | ? 2 | ? 0 | ? 2 | ? 99/101 | ? 0 | ? |
| Demoscopia/Cadena SER | 29 Oct 1989 | 91,451 | ? | 40.1; 176/182 | | ? 11/15 | ? 18 | ? 20/26 | ? 5/6 | ? 6/7 | ? 2 | ? 1/2 | ? 1 | ? 0 | ? 2 | ? 91/97 | ? 0 | ? |
| Sigma Dos/COPE | 29 Oct 1989 | ? | ? | ? 177/181 | | ? 14/16 | ? 18 | ? 17/18 | ? 5/6 | ? 5/6 | ? 1/2 | ? 2/3 | ? 0/1 | ? 0 | ? 1/2 | ? 102/106 | ? 0 | ? |
| Eco Consulting/Levante-EMV | 22 Oct 1989 | ? | ? | ? 164/173 | | ? 23/27 | ? 16/17 | ? 19/21 | ? 4/5 | ? 6 | ? 1/2 | ? 3 | ? 2 | – | ? 2/3 | ? 92/99 | ? 1 | ? |
| Metra Seis/El Independiente | 22 Oct 1989 | ? | ? | ? 172/179 | | ? 19 | ? 17/18 | ? 16/17 | ? 7 | ? 5 | ? 3 | ? 3 | ? 1 | ? 3 | ? 1 | ? 92/99 | – | ? |
| PP | 22 Oct 1989 | ? | 65 | ? 167/175 | | – | – | – | – | – | – | – | – | – | – | ? 105 | – | ? |
| ICP–Research/Diario 16 | 16–19 Oct 1989 | 9,524 | ? | 40.5; 174/178 | | 8.5; 18/21 | 4.9; 17/19 | 10.3; 22/26 | 1.4; 7 | 1.2; 7 | 0.5; 2 | ? 4 | ? 1 | – | ? 0/1 | 19.1; 87/91 | ? 2/3 | 21.4 |
| Opina/La Vanguardia | 16–18 Oct 1989 | 3,262 | 70 | 41.5; 172/178 | | 6.5; 14/15 | 4.5; 17/18 | 7.5; 13 | 1.9; 7/8 | 1.0; 3 | 0.8; 1/2 | 1.2; 3/4 | 0.6; 0/1 | 2.2; 0/1 | 1.0; 2/3 | 25.0; 104/107 | 2.7; 0/1 | 16.5 |
| PSOE | 17 Oct 1989 | ? | ? | 40.0 | | 8.0 | – | 9.0 | – | – | – | – | – | – | – | 21.0 | – | 19.0 |
| Sigma Dos/El Mundo | 16–17 Oct 1989 | 8,400 | ? | 39.2; 168 | | 10.3; 23 | 4.9; 17 | 8.0; 16 | 1.4; 5 | 1.1; 5 | 0.6; 2 | 1.2; 2 | 0.3; 1 | 1.8; 2 | 0.5; 1 | 24.2; 103 | 1.9; 1 | 15.0 |
| Gruppo/Colpisa | 16–17 Oct 1989 | 1,500 | 70 | 40.1; 173/183 | | 9.3; 20/21 | 4.8; 17/18 | 7.5; 14/16 | 1.1; 5 | 1.0; 475 | 0.6; 2 | 1.2; 2 | – | 1.8; 0/1 | 0.6; 1/2 | 23.6; 95/101 | 2.1; 0/1 | 16.5 |
| Demoscopia/El País | 9–15 Oct 1989 | 6,200 | 68 | 41.6; 176/182 | | 9.1; 16/19 | 5.0; 18 | 8.0; 15/16 | 1.5; 5/7 | 1.0; 4/5 | 0.7; 2 | ? 2/3 | ? 1 | – | 0.4; 1 | 22.8; 95/104 | 1.2; 0 | 18.8 |
| Opina/La Vanguardia | 7–11 Oct 1989 | 2,800 | 67 | 41.0; 172/178 | | 9.0; 18 | 4.8; 18/19 | 8.8; 15 | 2.0; 7/8 | 0.5; 2/3 | 1.0; 2 | 1.4; 3/4 | 0.7; 0/1 | – | 1.0; 1/2 | 24.0; 100/102 | 3.3; 0/1 | 17.0 |
| PSOE | 6 Oct 1989 | ? | ? | 40.0 | | 8.0 | – | 6.0 | – | – | – | – | – | – | – | 20.0 | – | 20.0 |
| Gruppo/Colpisa | 30 Sep–1 Oct 1989 | 1,500 | 67–72 | 38.3; 173/179 | | 9.0; 18/19 | 4.7; 16/18 | 7.4; 14/16 | 1.1; 5/6 | 1.1; 5 | 0.7; 2/3 | 1.2; 3 | – | 1.8; 0/2 | 0.7; 2 | 24.1; 95/103 | 2.0; 0/2 | 14.2 |
| Demoscopia/El País | 25–30 Sep 1989 | 6,200 | 68 | 42.1; 178/187 | | 7.3; 14/17 | 4.6; 17 | 8.7; 14/16 | 1.1; 5/8 | 0.9; 3/5 | 0.6 ? | ? 2/3 | – | – | 0.3 ? | 23.8; 93/99 | 1.2; 0 | 18.3 |
| CIS | 23–27 Sep 1989 | 2,482 | ? | ? 175/185 | | ? 14/15 | – | ? 11/15 | – | – | – | – | – | – | – | ? 93/99 | – | ? |
| Tribuna | 22 Sep 1989 | ? | ? | ? 178/186 | | ? 14/16 | ? 15/16 | ? 12/14 | ? 4/5 | ? 4/5 | ? 3 | ? 4/5 | – | – | ? 3 | ? 97/105 | ? 0/2 | ? |
| AEB/Cinco Días | 22 Sep 1989 | ? | 60 | ? 178/180 | | ? 15/18 | ? 18 | ? 10 | ? 4/5 | ? 6 | – | ? 6 | – | – | ? 2/3 | ? 100 | ? 0/1 | ? |
| Metra Seis/El Independiente | 19–22 Sep 1989 | 13,950 | ? | 38.2 | | 9.2 | 5.0 | 8.0 | 1.3 | 1.0 | 0.6 | – | – | – | 0.5 | 22.3 | – | 15.9 |
| ICP–Research/Diario 16 | 16–19 Sep 1989 | 1,600 | ? | 38.2 | | 9.1 | 4.7 | 10.0 | 1.3 | 1.4 | – | – | – | – | – | 20.2 | – | 18.0 |
| CIS | 7–14 Sep 1989 | 27,421 | ? | 43.0; 178/180 | | 9.0; 18 | – | 8.0; 12 | – | – | – | – | – | – | – | 21.0; 96 | – | 22.0 |
| Sigma Dos/Tiempo | 7–8 Sep 1989 | 800 | ? | 38.0– 39.0 | | 10.0– 11.0 | 4.5– 4.7 | 8.0– 9.0 | 1.0– 1.1 | 1.0– 1.1 | 0.7 | – | – | – | 0.6 | 22.5– 24.0 | – | 15.0– 15.5 |
| Iope–Etmar/El Periódico | 4–8 Sep 1989 | 1,483 | ? | 43.0; 185/188 | | 8.4; 18/19 | 3.8; 15/16 | 7.6; 12/13 | 1.0; 3/4 | 0.8; 3 | 0.6; 2 | 2.0; 4/5 | ? 2/3 | – | ? 2/3 | 22.8; 94/97 | – | 20.2 |
| Sigma Dos/Tiempo | 2–3 Sep 1989 | 800 | ? | 39.0– 41.0 | | 8.5– 9.5 | 4.5– 5.0 | 6.5– 7.5 | 1.0– 1.2 | 1.0– 2.0 | 0.5– 0.8 | – | – | – | 0.8– 1.1 | 23.0– 25.0 | – | 16.0 |
| DYM/Cambio 16 | 29–30 Aug 1989 | 1,000 | ? | 40.6 | | 9.2 | 5.2 | 6.4 | 1.4 | 1.4 | 1.1 | – | – | – | 0.9 | 25.1 | – | 15.5 |
| 1989 EP election | 15 Jun 1989 | —N/a | 54.7 | 39.6 (187) | | 7.1 (13) | 4.1 (17) | 6.1 (10) | 1.3 (5) | 1.4 (6) | 0.7 (2) | 1.7 (5) | 0.7 (2) | 1.0 (0) | 0.9 (3) | 21.4 (96) | 3.8 (2) | 18.2 |
| CIS | 9–11 May 1989 | 4,459 | ? | 39.5 | | 14.6 | 5.1 | 7.1 | 1.2 | – | – | – | – | – | – | 26.6 | – | 12.9 |
| Opina/La Vanguardia | 7–10 Apr 1989 | 1,610 | ? | 38.6 | | 12.6 | 6.4 | 6.4 | – | – | – | – | – | – | – | 26.5 | – | 12.1 |
| Gallup/Cambio 16 | 30 Jan 1989 | 600 | ? | 35.1 | | 14.6 | 4.1 | 7.6 | – | – | – | – | – | – | – | 30.1 | – | 5.0 |
| Opina/La Vanguardia | 17–18 Jan 1989 | 1,621 | ? | 37.9 | 23.1 | 13.2 | 6.2 | 6.6 | – | – | – | – | – | – | – | – | – | 14.8 |
| ICP–Research/Diario 16 | 15 Jan 1989 | 1,200 | ? | 37.5 | 20.8 | 13.7 | 4.5 | 9.1 | – | – | – | – | – | – | – | – | – | 16.7 |
| Metra Seis/El Independiente | 13 Jan 1989 | 1,000 | ? | 37.0 | 23.0 | 12.0 | 5.5 | 8.5 | 1.5 | 1.5 | – | – | – | – | – | – | – | 14.0 |
| CIS | 16–19 Dec 1988 | 2,498 | ? | ? 140/145 | ? 50 | ? 60/70 | – | ? 25/30 | – | – | – | – | – | – | – | – | – | ? |
| Opina/La Vanguardia | 13 Dec 1988 | ? | ? | 36.0 | 28.0 | 10.0 | 6.8 | 8.0 | – | – | – | – | – | – | – | – | – | 8.0 |
| ICP–Research/Diario 16 | 11 Dec 1988 | ? | ? | 41.0 | 19.0 | 11.0 | 5.0 | 9.0 | 1.0 | – | – | – | – | – | – | – | – | 22.0 |
| Opina/La Vanguardia | 29–30 Nov 1988 | 1,600 | ? | 34.3 | 27.1 | 9.9 | 7.2 | 7.8 | – | – | – | – | – | – | – | – | – | 7.2 |
| Eco Consulting/CDS | 1–21 Nov 1988 | 1,832 | ? | 39.0 | 26.0 | 14.0 | – | 7.0 | – | – | – | – | – | – | – | – | – | 13.0 |
| Iope–Etmar/El Periódico | 15–17 Nov 1988 | 700 | ? | 39.9 | 24.9 | 14.2 | 5.0 | 4.2 | – | – | – | – | – | – | – | – | – | 15.0 |
| ICP–Research/Diario 16 | 19–21 Sep 1988 | ? | ? | 41.0 | 15.5 | 13.6 | 5.7 | 7.5 | 0.7 | – | – | – | – | – | – | – | – | 25.5 |
| Emopública/Diario 16 | 27 Jun 1988 | ? | ? | 38.0 | 24.0 | 14.0 | – | 7.0 | – | – | – | – | – | – | – | – | – | 14.0 |
| Emopública–Burke/AP | 19 May 1988 | 1,800 | ? | 36.0– 37.0; 160/170 | 26.0– 27.0; 100/115 | 11.5– 12.5; 25/30 | 3.5– 4.0 ? | 5.5– 6.5 ? | <1.0 ? | 1.5 ? | <1.0 ? | – | – | – | <1.0 ? | – | – | 10.0 |
| Emopública/Diario 16 | 24 Apr 1988 | ? | ? | 34.0 | 24.0 | 15.0 | – | 7.0 | – | – | – | – | – | – | – | – | – | 10.0 |
| CIS | 8–10 Mar 1988 | 2,495 | ? | 42.0 | 22.0 | 12.0– 14.0 | – | 5.0– 6.0 | – | – | – | – | – | – | – | – | – | 20.0 |
| Emopública/Diario 16 | 28 Feb 1988 | ? | ? | 38.0 | 23.0 | 17.0 | – | 8.0 | – | – | – | – | – | – | – | – | – | 15.0 |
| CIS | 12–16 Feb 1988 | 2,485 | ? | 43.9 | 23.0 | 12.5 | – | 5.5 | – | – | – | – | – | – | – | – | – | 20.9 |
| CIS | 29 Jan–1 Feb 1988 | 2,478 | ? | 44.0 | 25.0 | 13.0 | – | 6.0 | – | – | – | – | – | – | – | – | – | 19.0 |
| CIS | 22–26 Jan 1988 | 2,497 | ? | 42.0; 171 | 23.0 ? | 14.5 ? | – | 6.0 ? | – | – | – | – | – | – | – | – | – | 19.0 |
| Emopública–Burke/AP | 24 Jan 1988 | ? | ? | 37.0– 39.0 | 20.0– 22.0 | 11.0– 13.0 | 3.0– 4.0 | 4.0– 6.0 | 1.0 | 2.0– 4.0 | 1.0 | – | – | – | <1.0 | – | – | 17.0 |
| Emopública/Diario 16 | 17 Jan 1988 | ? | ? | 40.0 | 26.0 | 14.0 | 5.0 | 6.0 | – | – | – | – | – | – | – | – | – | 14.0 |
| Emopública/Diario 16 | 20 Dec 1987 | ? | ? | 39.0 | 25.0 | 14.0 | 6.0 | 5.0 | – | – | – | – | – | – | – | – | – | 14.0 |
| Emopública/Diario 16 | 15 Nov 1987 | ? | ? | 40.0 | 27.0 | 17.0 | – | – | – | – | – | – | – | – | – | – | – | 13.0 |
| Emopública–Burke/AP | 25 Oct 1987 | ? | ? | 38.0– 40.0 | 23.0– 25.0 | 11.0– 13.0 | 3.5– 4.0 | 4.0– 6.0 | 1.0 | 2.0– 4.0 | 1.0 | – | – | – | <1.0 | – | – | 15.0 |
| Emopública/Diario 16 | 11 Oct 1987 | ? | ? | 34.0 | 20.0 | 24.0 | – | – | – | – | – | – | – | – | – | – | – | 10.0 |
| Metra Seis/El Independiente | 1–6 Sep 1987 | ? | ? | 35.5 | 20.4 | 21.9 | 5.6 | 5.8 | – | – | – | – | – | – | – | – | – | 13.6 |
| 1987 EP election | 10 Jun 1987 | —N/a | 68.5 | 39.1 (169) | 24.6 (108) | 10.3 (23) | 4.4 (16) | 5.3 (9) | 1.1 (5) | 1.3 (6) | 0.6 (2) | 0.9 (2) | 0.8 (2) | 0.6 (0) | 1.0 (4) | – | – | 14.5 |
| 1987 local elections | 10 Jun 1987 | —N/a | 69.4 | 37.1 | 20.9 | 9.8 | 5.2 | 7.9 | 1.2 | 1.2 | 0.6 | 1.1 | 0.8 | 0.1 | 1.1 | – | – | 16.2 |
| Sofemasa/AP | 16 Apr 1987 | 6,000 | ? | 35.0 | 23.0 | 17.0 | – | 8.0 | – | – | – | – | – | – | – | – | – | 12.0 |
| Gallup/El Periódico | 19 Oct–23 Dec 1986 | 1,994 | ? | 42.0 | 23.1 | 11.6 | – | – | – | – | – | – | – | – | – | – | – | 18.9 |
| CIS | 18–21 Sep 1986 | 2,813 | ? | 44.7 | 21.9 | 14.2 | 5.4 | 4.5 | 1.2 | – | – | – | – | – | – | – | – | 22.8 |
| 1986 general election | 22 Jun 1986 | —N/a | 70.5 | 44.1; 184 | 26.0 (Note: Result for People's Coalition.); 105 | 9.2; 19 | 5.0; 18 | 4.6; 7 | 1.5; 6 | 1.1; 5 | 0.5; 2 | 0.5; 0 | 0.3; 1 | 0.2; 0 | – | – | – | 18.1 |

==== Voting preferences ====
The table below lists raw, unweighted voting preferences.

| Polling firm/Commissioner | Fieldwork date | Sample size | PSOE | AP | CDS | CiU | IU | PNV | HB | PTE–UC | LV | PP | ARM | Question | X mark | Lead |
|---|---|---|---|---|---|---|---|---|---|---|---|---|---|---|---|---|
| 1989 general election (Note: Does not include non-resident citizens.) | 29 Oct 1989 | —N/a | 27.5 | | 5.5 | 3.5 | 6.3 | 0.9 | 0.7 | 0.3 | 0.5 | 17.9 | 0.7 | —N/a | 30.1 | 9.6 |
| Opina/La Vanguardia | 16–18 Oct 1989 | 3,262 | 19.7 | | 3.9 | 4.0 | 4.6 | 1.6 | 0.8 | – | 1.4 | 14.8 | 1.6 | 32.8 | 6.9 | 4.9 |
| ASEP | 9–13 Oct 1989 | 1,208 | 30.3 | | 4.6 | 5.2* | 6.9 | * | 1.0** | – | 2.3 | 7.7 | 0.6 | 30.9 | 9.0 | 22.6 |
| Opina/La Vanguardia | 7–11 Oct 1989 | 2,800 | 24.7 | | 4.6 | 3.6 | 4.7 | – | – | – | – | 11.4 | – | – | – | 13.3 |
| CIS | 23–27 Sep 1989 | 2,482 | 31.0 | | 5.0 | 3.0 | 6.0 | 1.0 | – | – | – | 10.0 | 1.0 | 32.0 | 7.0 | 21.0 |
| CIS | 16–20 Sep 1989 | 2,495 | 30.2 | | 3.7 | 2.7 | 5.8 | 0.7 | – | – | – | 9.5 | – | 34.6 | 8.0 | 24.0 |
| ASEP | 11–16 Sep 1989 | 1,195 | 28.3 | | 3.8 | 4.9* | 8.3 | * | 1.3** | – | 1.9 | 8.0 | 0.8 | 32.6 | 8.3 | 20.3 |
| Demoscopia/El País | 9–15 Sep 1989 | 1,200 | 21.0 | | 4.0 | 2.0 | 3.0 | 0.3 | 0.2 | – | – | 8.0 | – | 59.0 | | 13.0 |
| CIS | 2–5 Sep 1989 | 2,471 | 34.0 | | 6.0 | 2.0 | 5.0 | 1.0 | – | – | – | 10.0 | – | 29.0 | 10.0 | 24.0 |
| CIS | 15–19 Jul 1989 | 2,498 | 29.8 | | 5.3 | 3.9 | 5.1 | 0.7 | – | – | – | 9.8 | – | 31.4 | 9.9 | 20.0 |
| Demoscopia/El País | 23–29 Jun 1989 | 1,200 | 26.0 | | – | – | 4.3 | – | – | – | – | – | – | – | – | ? |
| CIS | 23–28 Jun 1989 | 4,583 | 29.0 | | 3.0 | 3.0 | 5.0 | 1.0 | – | – | – | 10.0 | – | 35.0 | 8.0 | 19.0 |
| CIS | 17–22 Jun 1989 | 3,586 | 33.8 | | 4.1 | 3.2 | 5.5 | 1.1 | – | – | – | 9.8 | – | 28.5 | 9.0 | 24.0 |
| ASEP | 5–10 Jun 1989 | 1,198 | 25.1 | | 6.3 | 5.6* | 6.7 | * | 1.3** | – | – | 7.4 | – | 28.3 | 15.3 | 17.7 |
| CIS | 5–6 Jun 1989 | 2,498 | 26.0 | | 5.0 | 2.0 | 4.0 | 1.0 | – | – | – | 11.0 | – | 37.0 | 10.0 | 15.0 |
| CIS | 23–24 May 1989 | 4,953 | 26.0 | | 6.0 | 3.0 | 5.0 | 1.0 | – | – | – | 11.0 | – | 34.0 | 9.0 | 15.0 |
| CIS | 16–17 May 1989 | 2,487 | 28.0 | | 7.0 | 3.0 | 4.0 | 1.0 | – | – | – | 11.0 | – | 33.0 | 9.0 | 17.0 |
| CIS | 11–16 May 1989 | 3,072 | 27.9 | | 6.3 | 2.6 | 4.8 | 0.9 | – | – | – | 11.5 | – | 34.9 | 7.9 | 16.4 |
| ASEP | 8–13 May 1989 | 1,214 | 27.0 | | 8.7 | 3.8* | 5.1 | * | 1.6** | – | – | 9.6 | – | 27.6 | 12.5 | 17.4 |
| CIS | 9–11 May 1989 | 4,459 | 28.0 | | 7.0 | 3.0 | 5.0 | 1.0 | – | – | – | 12.0 | – | 31.0 | 9.0 | 16.0 |
| CIS | 4–5 May 1989 | 2,496 | 29.0 | | 7.0 | 3.0 | 5.0 | 1.0 | – | – | – | 11.0 | – | 32.0 | 8.0 | 18.0 |
| CIS | 26–28 Apr 1989 | 4,965 | 28.0 | | 8.0 | 3.0 | 4.0 | 1.0 | – | – | – | 12.0 | – | 32.0 | 9.0 | 16.0 |
| CIS | 22–24 Apr 1989 | 2,499 | 27.0 | | 7.0 | 3.0 | 5.0 | 1.0 | – | – | – | 10.0 | – | 36.0 | 8.0 | 17.0 |
| ASEP | 10–16 Apr 1989 | 1,205 | 23.9 | | 9.3 | 5.4* | 4.9 | * | 1.2** | – | – | 8.7 | – | 26.9 | 15.8 | 14.6 |
| IU | 20 Mar–15 Apr 1989 | ? | 24.7 | | 7.8 | – | 9.8 | – | – | – | – | 13.2 | – | – | 38.0 | 11.5 |
| CIS | 6–10 Apr 1989 | 2,951 | 29.9 | | 6.4 | 2.5 | 5.5 | 0.9 | – | – | – | 10.5 | – | 31.8 | 9.0 | 19.4 |
| Demoscopia/El País | 29 Mar–4 Apr 1989 | 1,200 | 21.0 | | 4.0 | 2.0 | 3.0 | 0.2 | 1.0 | – | – | 8.0 | – | 57.5 | | 13.0 |
| CIS | 14–17 Mar 1989 | 2,477 | 26.2 | | 7.2 | 2.9 | 4.3 | 1.0 | – | – | – | 11.9 | – | 32.9 | 9.7 | 14.3 |
| CIS | 10–14 Mar 1989 | 2,483 | 29.8 | | 7.5 | 2.6 | 5.0 | 0.6 | 0.7 | 0.2 | – | 11.3 | – | 30.4 | 9.3 | 18.5 |
| ASEP | 6–12 Mar 1989 | 1,203 | 24.7 | | 11.1 | 4.7* | 6.5 | * | 1.0** | – | – | 9.8 | – | 27.4 | 12.1 | 13.6 |
| CIS | 17–20 Feb 1989 | 2,492 | 25.0 | | 6.0 | 2.0 | 4.0 | – | – | – | – | 9.0 | – | 39.0 | 12.0 | 16.0 |
| Demoscopia/El País | 15–16 Feb 1989 | 800 | 23.0 | | 5.0 | – | 5.0 | – | – | – | – | 10.0 | – | 39.0 | 10.0 | 13.0 |
| CIS | 10–14 Feb 1989 | 2,472 | 23.6 | | 6.9 | 2.9 | 5.1 | 0.4 | – | – | – | 11.3 | – | 35.4 | 11.2 | 12.3 |
| ASEP | 6–12 Feb 1989 | 1,209 | 23.8 | | 10.6 | 7.1* | 5.5 | * | 0.9** | – | – | 10.0 | – | 26.3 | 12.8 | 13.2 |
| OTR–Emopública/PP | 6–11 Feb 1989 | 1,190 | 20.7 | | 7.4 | – | 6.1 | – | – | – | – | 22.0 | – | 7.4 | 29.3 | 1.3 |
| CIS | 30 Jan–9 Feb 1989 | 27,287 | 25.0 | | 6.0 | 2.0 | 4.0 | 1.0 | – | – | – | 11.0 | – | 35.0 | 13.0 | 14.0 |
| CIS | 23–26 Jan 1989 | 3,356 | 24.0 | 12.0 | 6.0 | 3.0 | 6.0 | 1.0 | – | – | – | – | – | 37.0 | 7.0 | 12.0 |
| ASEP | 16–21 Jan 1989 | 1,211 | 26.0 | 10.0 | 11.3 | 4.1* | 5.4 | * | 1.4** | – | – | – | – | 25.8 | 13.5 | 14.7 |
| CIS | 10–12 Jan 1989 | 2,497 | 25.9 | 8.5 | 6.5 | 1.9 | 4.7 | 1.2 | – | – | – | – | – | 36.4 | 12.1 | 17.4 |
| OTR | 9 Jan 1989 | ? | 17.0 | 6.0 | 4.0 | – | 4.0 | – | – | – | – | – | – | 36.0 | 16.0 | 11.0 |
| CIS | 21–27 Dec 1988 | 2,494 | 22.0 | 9.0 | 7.0 | 2.0 | 5.0 | 1.0 | – | – | – | – | – | 38.0 | 13.0 | 13.0 |
| CIS | 16–19 Dec 1988 | 2,498 | 22.0 | 9.0 | 7.0 | 3.0 | 6.0 | 1.0 | – | – | – | – | – | 40.0 | 9.0 | 13.0 |
| Demoscopia/El País | 15 Dec 1988 | ? | 21.0 | 6.0 | 4.0 | – | 6.0 | – | – | – | – | – | – | – | – | 15.0 |
| ASEP | 5–13 Dec 1988 | 1,219 | 23.4 | 8.7 | 9.5 | 5.2* | 6.5 | * | 0.9** | – | – | – | – | 28.9 | 13.8 | 13.9 |
| ICP–Research/Diario 16 | 11 Dec 1988 | ? | 25.2 | – | – | – | – | – | – | – | – | – | – | – | – | ? |
| CIS | 5–10 Dec 1988 | 2,499 | 21.0 | 7.0 | 6.0 | 2.0 | 3.0 | 1.0 | – | – | – | – | – | 44.0 | 13.0 | 14.0 |
| Demoscopia/El País | 5–10 Dec 1988 | 1,200 | 23.0 | 8.0 | – | – | – | – | – | – | – | – | – | – | – | ? |
| CIS | 30 Nov–3 Dec 1988 | 2,494 | 26.4 | 9.7 | 6.8 | 2.2 | 5.7 | 0.3 | – | – | – | – | – | 34.4 | 11.2 | 16.7 |
| CIS | 23–24 Nov 1988 | 2,496 | 25.0 | 8.0 | 6.0 | 2.0 | 4.0 | 1.0 | – | – | – | – | – | 37.0 | 13.0 | 17.0 |
| Eco Consulting/CDS | 1–21 Nov 1988 | 1,832 | 29.3 | 7.5 | 11.8 | – | 6.6 | – | – | – | – | – | – | – | – | 17.5 |
| CIS | 16–19 Nov 1988 | 2,504 | 26.0 | 9.0 | 7.0 | 3.0 | 3.0 | 1.0 | – | – | – | – | – | 36.0 | 12.0 | 17.0 |
| Iope–Etmar/El Periódico | 15–17 Nov 1988 | 700 | 23.0 | 12.2 | 9.2 | 2.8 | 2.4 | – | – | – | – | – | – | 43.9 | 6.5 | 10.8 |
| CIS | 11–15 Nov 1988 | 3,366 | 27.0 | 9.0 | 8.0 | 3.0 | 5.0 | 1.0 | – | – | – | – | – | 32.0 | 12.0 | 18.0 |
| ASEP | 7–12 Nov 1988 | 1,226 | 26.0 | 10.4 | 8.3 | 7.1* | 4.9 | * | 1.2** | – | – | – | – | 25.0 | 14.7 | 15.6 |
| Demoscopia/El País | 24–25 Oct 1988 | 800 | 21.0 | 13.0 | – | – | – | – | – | – | – | – | – | – | – | 8.0 |
| CIS | 13–17 Oct 1988 | 2,499 | 25.7 | 10.5 | 6.5 | 3.7 | 4.4 | 0.4 | – | – | – | – | – | 33.7 | 11.9 | 15.2 |
| ASEP | 10–16 Oct 1988 | 1,205 | 25.9 | 7.7 | 8.2 | 5.2* | 5.7 | * | 1.7** | – | – | – | – | 27.3 | 14.7 | 17.7 |
| Demoscopia/El País | 1–5 Oct 1988 | 1,200 | 20.0 | 6.0 | – | – | – | – | – | – | – | – | – | – | – | ? |
| CIS | 20–24 Sep 1988 | 2,488 | 28.0 | 8.0 | 8.0 | 2.0 | 4.0 | 1.0 | – | – | – | – | – | 36.0 | 10.0 | 20.0 |
| ICP–Research/Diario 16 | 19–21 Sep 1988 | ? | 26.6 | 10.3 | 8.3 | 3.1 | 5.0 | 0.3 | – | – | – | – | – | 20.8 | 15.3 | 16.3 |
| CIS | 15–19 Sep 1988 | 2,492 | 25.7 | 9.2 | 8.2 | 3.0 | 3.7 | 0.4 | – | – | – | – | – | 33.9 | 12.1 | 16.5 |
| OYCOS | 10–19 Sep 1988 | 1,200 | 20.0 | 9.0 | 7.0 | 2.5 | 3.0 | 0.6 | 0.4 | – | – | – | – | 37.0 | 16.0 | 11.0 |
| CIS | 19–21 Jul 1988 | 2,488 | 25.0 | 7.0 | 6.0 | 3.0 | 4.0 | 1.0 | – | 0.0 | – | – | – | 37.0 | 13.0 | 18.0 |
| CIS | 14–18 Jul 1988 | 2,443 | 30.1 | 8.0 | 6.4 | 2.5 | 4.5 | 0.5 | – | – | – | – | – | 32.1 | 12.3 | 22.1 |
| CIS | 29 Jun–4 Jul 1988 | 4,981 | 24.0 | 7.0 | 6.0 | 3.0 | 4.0 | 1.0 | – | 0.0 | – | – | – | 41.0 | 11.0 | 17.0 |
| Demoscopia/El País | 20–26 Jun 1988 | 1,200 | 20.0 | – | – | – | – | – | – | – | – | – | – | 39.0 | 13.0 | ? |
| ASEP | 13–18 Jun 1988 | 1,205 | 26.5 | 10.4 | 9.4 | 6.5* | 6.7 | * | 1.3** | – | – | – | – | 24.1 | 9.8 | 16.1 |
| CIS | 13–16 Jun 1988 | 2,485 | 24.0 | 7.0 | 7.0 | 3.0 | 4.0 | 1.0 | – | – | – | – | – | 42.0 | 9.0 | 17.0 |
| CIS | 9–13 Jun 1988 | 2,487 | 28.1 | 9.0 | 8.1 | 2.6 | 5.3 | 0.6 | – | – | – | – | – | 31.5 | 10.5 | 19.1 |
| CIS | 31 May–4 Jun 1988 | 2,498 | 24.0 | 8.0 | 6.0 | 3.0 | 4.0 | 1.0 | – | – | – | – | – | 40.0 | 11.0 | 16.0 |
| ASEP | 16–22 May 1988 | 1,232 | 28.7 | 10.3 | 9.0 | 5.7* | 5.9 | * | 1.7** | – | – | – | – | 22.8 | 11.5 | 18.4 |
| Emopública–Burke/AP | 19 May 1988 | 1,800 | 27.9 | 10.1 | 6.4 | 3.5 | 4.7 | 0.5 | 1.3 | – | – | – | – | 29.9 | 12.1 | 17.8 |
| CIS | 11–13 May 1988 | 2,449 | 25.5 | 9.8 | 9.1 | 2.6 | 4.9 | 0.7 | – | – | – | – | – | 33.1 | 11.0 | 15.7 |
| CIS | 6–8 May 1988 | 2,394 | 24.0 | 9.0 | 7.0 | 3.0 | 4.0 | 1.0 | – | 0.0 | – | – | – | 38.0 | 12.0 | 15.0 |
| CIS | 26–27 Apr 1988 | 2,502 | 27.0 | 12.0 | 9.0 | 3.0 | 5.0 | 1.0 | – | – | – | – | – | 30.0 | 10.0 | 15.0 |
| CIS | 20–25 Apr 1988 | 2,496 | 30.0 | 11.6 | 10.5 | 2.5 | 5.1 | 0.7 | – | – | – | – | – | 25.4 | 11.0 | 18.4 |
| Emopública/Diario 16 | 24 Apr 1988 | ? | 23.8 | 11.0 | 12.9 | – | – | – | – | – | – | – | – | 31.1 | – | 10.9 |
| ASEP | 18–23 Apr 1988 | 1,211 | 27.6 | 9.6 | 9.1 | 5.9* | 5.1 | * | 1.0** | – | – | – | – | 27.2 | 11.7 | 18.0 |
| Demoscopia/El País | 9–14 Apr 1988 | 1,200 | 20.0 | 8.0 | 10.0 | – | – | – | – | – | – | – | – | – | – | 10.0 |
| CIS | 15–23 Mar 1988 | 27,377 | 33.0 | 10.0 | 10.0 | 2.0 | 4.0 | 1.0 | – | – | – | – | – | 27.0 | 11.0 | 23.0 |
| ASEP | 7–11 Mar 1988 | 1,203 | 26.7 | 8.7 | 10.8 | 5.9* | 5.3 | * | 1.4** | – | – | – | – | 26.2 | 12.3 | 15.9 |
| CIS | 8–10 Mar 1988 | 2,495 | 25.4 | 10.0 | 6.7 | 2.9 | 4.4 | 0.7 | 0.7 | 0.6 | – | – | – | 36.8 | 8.7 | 16.0 |
| CIS | 4–7 Mar 1988 | 2,495 | 24.0 | 8.0 | 5.0 | 2.0 | 3.0 | 0.0 | 0.0 | 0.0 | – | – | – | 43.0 | 11.0 | 16.0 |
| CIS | 27 Feb–1 Mar 1988 | 2,487 | 26.0 | 10.0 | 8.0 | 2.0 | 5.0 | 1.0 | – | – | – | – | – | 34.0 | 11.0 | 16.0 |
| CIS | 12–16 Feb 1988 | 2,485 | 29.1 | 7.4 | 6.3 | 3.1 | 3.3 | 0.6 | – | – | – | – | – | 36.4 | 10.5 | 21.7 |
| ASEP | 8–12 Feb 1988 | 1,220 | 30.7 | 8.3 | 11.3 | 6.6* | 4.3 | * | 1.9** | – | – | – | – | 23.0 | 11.4 | 19.4 |
| CIS | 3–8 Feb 1988 | 3,673 | 27.0 | 9.0 | 6.0 | 2.0 | 4.0 | 1.0 | 1.0 | 1.0 | – | – | – | 35.0 | 11.0 | 18.0 |
| CIS | 29 Jan–1 Feb 1988 | 2,478 | 34.0 | 8.0 | 7.0 | 3.0 | 4.0 | 1.0 | – | – | – | – | – | 28.0 | 9.0 | 26.0 |
| CIS | 22–26 Jan 1988 | 2,497 | 33.3 | 8.9 | 9.4 | 2.6 | 3.7 | 1.0 | – | – | – | – | – | 25.8 | 11.0 | 23.9 |
| Emopública–Burke/AP | 24 Jan 1988 | ? | 28.2 | 7.8 | 7.9 | 3.0 | 3.7 | 0.7 | 0.9 | 0.4 | – | – | – | 43.2 | | 20.3 |
| ASEP | 11–15 Jan 1988 | 1,219 | 27.0 | 8.4 | 12.5 | 6.6* | 5.1 | * | 1.7** | – | – | – | – | 22.7 | 13.6 | 14.5 |
| CIS | 23 Dec–3 Jan 1988 | 2,464 | 26.0 | 9.0 | 7.0 | 2.0 | 4.0 | – | – | – | – | – | – | 36.0 | 12.0 | 17.0 |
| CIS | 19–22 Dec 1987 | 2,488 | 26.6 | 8.7 | 8.0 | 2.8 | 4.5 | 0.4 | – | – | – | – | – | 31.4 | 13.3 | 17.9 |
| Emopública/Diario 16 | 20 Dec 1987 | ? | 27.8 | 12.8 | 12.1 | – | 3.4 | – | – | – | – | – | – | – | – | 15.0 |
| CIS | 11–15 Dec 1987 | 2,475 | 24.4 | 10.1 | 6.3 | 2.5 | 3.2 | 0.7 | – | – | – | – | – | 38.8 | 9.9 | 14.3 |
| Demoscopia/El País | 8–13 Dec 1987 | 1,200 | 25.0 | 10.0 | 9.0 | – | – | – | – | – | – | – | – | – | – | 15.0 |
| CIS | 4–7 Dec 1987 | 2,491 | 30.0 | 7.0 | 7.0 | 2.0 | 3.0 | 1.0 | – | – | – | – | – | 37.0 | 10.0 | 23.0 |
| ASEP | 30 Nov–4 Dec 1987 | 1,209 | 29.1 | 10.4 | 10.3 | 5.9* | 4.5 | * | 1.5** | – | – | – | – | 25.6 | 9.5 | 18.7 |
| CIS | 26–30 Nov 1987 | 2,490 | 25.0 | 12.0 | 8.0 | 3.0 | 5.0 | 1.0 | – | – | – | – | – | 30.0 | 12.0 | 13.0 |
| CIS | 18–21 Nov 1987 | 2,495 | 28.0 | 9.0 | 6.0 | 3.0 | 3.0 | 1.0 | – | – | – | – | – | 34.0 | 12.0 | 19.0 |
| CIS | 14–17 Nov 1987 | 2,489 | 32.5 | 9.9 | 11.1 | 2.8 | 4.3 | 0.7 | – | – | – | – | – | 25.7 | 8.6 | 21.4 |
| ASEP | 2–6 Nov 1987 | 1,210 | 30.5 | 10.5 | 10.6 | 6.3* | 5.2 | * | 1.4** | – | – | – | – | 22.4 | 9.9 | 19.9 |
| CIS | 28 Oct–2 Nov 1987 | 2,454 | 25.0 | 11.0 | 9.0 | 3.0 | 5.0 | 1.0 | – | – | – | – | – | 31.0 | 11.0 | 14.0 |
| CIS | 28 Oct–2 Nov 1987 | 2,499 | 28.0 | 10.0 | 8.0 | 2.0 | 4.0 | 1.0 | – | – | – | – | – | 31.0 | 12.0 | 18.0 |
| Emopública–Burke/AP | 25 Oct 1987 | ? | 28.7 | 9.8 | 9.1 | 3.8 | 4.1 | 0.6 | 0.5 | – | – | – | – | 39.0 | | 18.9 |
| CIS | 17–21 Oct 1987 | 2,492 | 28.6 | 8.8 | 6.6 | 2.7 | 3.6 | 0.7 | – | – | – | – | – | 33.4 | 11.5 | 19.8 |
| CIS | 3–13 Oct 1987 | 11,130 | 27.0 | 9.0 | 8.0 | 3.0 | 3.0 | 1.0 | – | 1.0 | – | – | – | 34.0 | 10.0 | 18.0 |
| CIS | 3–7 Oct 1987 | 2,495 | 25.0 | 7.0 | 7.0 | 2.0 | 3.0 | 1.0 | – | – | – | – | – | 39.0 | 13.0 | 18.0 |
| ASEP | 1–7 Oct 1987 | 1,194 | 27.1 | 8.9 | 11.7 | 6.0* | 4.7 | * | 1.9** | – | – | – | – | 26.2 | 11.9 | 15.4 |
| CIS | 25–28 Sep 1987 | 2,494 | 27.0 | 8.0 | 7.0 | 2.0 | 4.0 | 1.0 | – | – | – | – | – | 35.0 | 12.0 | 19.0 |
| CIS | 17–21 Sep 1987 | 2,488 | 33.2 | 9.3 | 8.6 | 3.1 | 3.7 | 0.4 | – | – | – | – | – | 25.2 | 11.0 | 23.9 |
| CIS | 3–15 Sep 1987 | 6,489 | 27.2 | 10.1 | 7.4 | 2.4 | 4.2 | 0.6 | 0.7 | 0.3 | – | – | – | 30.3 | 13.1 | 17.1 |
| CIS | 22–24 Jul 1987 | 2,489 | 29.9 | 9.0 | 8.0 | 2.0 | 4.5 | 0.6 | – | 1.0 | – | – | – | 29.0 | 11.7 | 20.9 |
| ASEP | 6–10 Jul 1987 | 1,198 | 27.5 | 11.0 | 10.7 | 6.4* | 4.3 | * | – | – | – | – | – | 27.5 | 8.7 | 16.5 |
| Demoscopia/El País | 29 Jun–5 Jul 1987 | 1,200 | 27.0 | 13.0 | 11.0 | – | 2.0 | – | – | – | – | – | – | 30.0 | 7.0 | 14.0 |
| CIS | 20–22 Jun 1987 | 2,493 | 32.0 | 13.0 | 8.0 | 2.0 | 4.0 | 1.0 | – | – | – | – | – | 28.0 | 7.0 | 19.0 |
| ASEP | 8–12 Jun 1987 | 1,198 | 28.1 | 8.7 | 10.9 | 5.0* | 5.7 | * | – | – | – | – | – | 27.5 | 9.6 | 17.2 |
| CIS | 2–6 Jun 1987 | 2,493 | 32.2 | 11.8 | 8.0 | 2.3 | 5.5 | 0.7 | – | – | – | – | – | 25.8 | 8.6 | 20.4 |
| CIS | 20–22 May 1987 | 2,490 | 32.7 | 10.8 | 11.9 | 2.5 | 4.1 | 0.9 | – | 1.0 | – | – | – | 25.0 | 7.2 | 20.8 |
| ASEP | 11–16 May 1987 | 1,200 | 28.2 | 10.5 | 8.8 | 4.8* | 4.1 | * | – | – | – | – | – | 28.6 | 10.8 | 17.7 |
| CIS | 27–30 Apr 1987 | 2,482 | 32.0 | 11.0 | 11.0 | 3.0 | 4.0 | 1.0 | – | – | – | – | – | 26.0 | 8.0 | 21.0 |
| CIS | 22–25 Apr 1987 | 2,475 | 28.6 | 9.6 | 7.1 | 2.8 | 3.0 | 0.6 | – | – | – | – | – | 31.3 | 12.9 | 19.0 |
| ASEP | 6–10 Apr 1987 | 1,196 | 25.8 | 9.3 | 11.0 | 5.3* | 4.5 | * | – | – | – | – | – | 32.9 | 7.9 | 14.8 |
| CIS | 1–2 Apr 1987 | 2,505 | 28.0 | 12.0 | 8.0 | 2.0 | 3.0 | 1.0 | – | – | – | – | – | 30.0 | 12.0 | 16.0 |
| Demoscopia/El País | 28 Mar–1 Apr 1987 | 1,200 | 27.0 | 9.0 | 5.0 | – | 3.0 | – | – | – | – | – | – | 32.0 | 15.0 | 18.0 |
| CIS | 24–28 Mar 1987 | 3,098 | 29.6 | 9.3 | 7.9 | 2.6 | 3.1 | 0.8 | – | 1.0 | – | – | – | 30.9 | 10.8 | 20.3 |
| OTR–Press | 20 Mar 1987 | ? | 19.0 | 6.0 | 4.0 | – | 3.0 | – | – | – | – | – | – | – | – | 13.0 |
| ASEP | 9–14 Mar 1987 | 1,198 | 28.6 | 10.7 | 10.7 | 6.5* | 4.8 | * | – | – | – | – | – | 27.4 | 7.0 | 17.9 |
| CIS | 12–16 Feb 1987 | 2,497 | 32.0 | 12.0 | 6.6 | 2.4 | 3.8 | 0.8 | – | 1.0 | – | – | – | 28.1 | 9.7 | 20.0 |
| ASEP | 9–14 Feb 1987 | 1,169 | 31.3 | 11.1 | 10.3 | 5.3* | 3.8 | * | – | – | – | – | – | 27.4 | 7.4 | 20.2 |
| ASEP | 12–17 Jan 1987 | 1,188 | 32.7 | 6.9 | 8.6 | 5.2* | 5.1 | * | – | – | – | – | – | 26.0 | 12.2 | 24.1 |
| CIS | 1–2 Jan 1987 | 2,492 | 25.0 | 7.0 | 5.0 | 2.0 | 4.0 | 1.0 | – | – | – | – | – | 39.0 | 14.0 | 18.0 |
| OYCOS | 16–20 Dec 1986 | 1,200 | 24.0 | 8.0 | 7.0 | 3.0 | 2.0 | 0.9 | 0.8 | – | – | – | – | 37.0 | 13.0 | 16.0 |
| ASEP | 8–19 Dec 1986 | 1,194 | 34.2 | 8.7 | 10.5 | 5.2* | 4.8 | * | – | – | – | – | – | 22.9 | 10.1 | 23.7 |
| CIS | 10 Dec 1986 | 2,488 | 31.0 | 7.2 | 7.1 | 2.5 | 2.2 | 1.0 | – | – | – | – | – | 33.1 | 11.4 | 23.8 |
| CIS | 1 Dec 1986 | 2,491 | 32.0 | 7.0 | 6.0 | 2.0 | 3.0 | 1.0 | – | – | – | – | – | 35.0 | 11.0 | 25.0 |
| CIS | 14–19 Nov 1986 | 2,493 | 34.4 | 8.4 | 6.6 | 2.4 | 3.2 | 0.8 | – | – | – | – | – | 30.4 | 9.6 | 26.0 |
| ASEP | 3–15 Nov 1986 | 1,181 | 30.9 | 8.1 | 11.1 | 6.0* | 4.3 | * | – | – | – | – | – | 32.8 | 2.7 | 19.8 |
| CIS | 1 Nov 1986 | 2,491 | 35.0 | 10.0 | 6.0 | 2.0 | 4.0 | 1.0 | – | 1.0 | – | – | – | 29.0 | 9.0 | 25.0 |
| CIS | 19–22 Oct 1986 | 2,484 | 33.6 | 9.2 | 8.8 | 3.1 | 2.5 | 0.7 | – | – | – | – | – | 28.6 | 10.1 | 24.4 |
| CIS | 18–21 Sep 1986 | 2,813 | 36.2 | 10.0 | 8.3 | 2.6 | 3.3 | 0.7 | – | 1.0 | – | – | – | 24.4 | 9.2 | 26.2 |
| CIS | 1 Jul 1986 | 8,286 | 38.5 | 11.1 | 7.8 | 3.3 | 3.8 | 0.9 | 1.0 | 0.7 | – | – | – | 27.6 | 2.3 | 27.4 |
| 1986 general election | 22 Jun 1986 | —N/a | 30.8 | 18.1 | 6.4 | 3.5 | 3.2 | 1.1 | 0.8 | 0.8 | 0.1 | – | – | —N/a | 29.1 | 12.7 |
(*) Includes data for CiU, PNV, ERC, EA, CG, PRC, PAR, UPN, PA, UV, EU and AIC. (**) Includes data for HB, EE and BNG.

==== Victory preference ====
The table below lists opinion polling on the victory preferences for each party in the event of a general election taking place.

| Polling firm/Commissioner | Fieldwork date | Sample size | PSOE | CDS | CiU | IU | PNV | PP | Other/ None | Question | Lead |
|---|---|---|---|---|---|---|---|---|---|---|---|
| CIS | 23–27 Sep 1989 | 2,482 | 36.0 | 7.0 | 3.0 | 7.0 | 1.0 | 12.0 | 4.0 | 30.0 | 24.0 |
| CIS | 16–20 Sep 1989 | 2,495 | 36.0 | 5.0 | 3.0 | 6.0 | – | 12.0 | 4.0 | 34.0 | 24.0 |
| CIS | 2–5 Sep 1989 | 2,471 | 38.0 | 7.0 | 2.0 | 6.0 | 1.0 | 11.0 | 2.0 | 33.0 | 27.0 |
| CIS | 15–19 Jul 1989 | 2,498 | 36.0 | 7.0 | 4.0 | 6.0 | 1.0 | 12.0 | 3.0 | 31.0 | 24.0 |
| CIS | 17–22 Jun 1989 | 3,586 | 38.0 | 5.0 | 3.0 | 6.0 | 1.0 | 12.0 | 6.0 | 29.0 | 26.0 |
