= 1988 Spanish general strike =

The 1988 Spanish general strike, known locally as 14-D (shortened form of 14 Diciembre), was a general strike in Spain that took place on December 14, 1988. It was called by the two main trade unions: CCOO and Unión General de Trabajadores (UGT).

Triggered by a significant reform in the labour market, namely a new more flexible contract for inexperienced youngsters with less redundancy pay, the strike was moreover a manifestation of general discontent with Spain's PSOE government policies. The government's economic policies were thought to be too conservative by trade unions and many left-wing voters.

The country was completely and peacefully paralyzed for 24 hours, prompting the government to negotiate with the unions. Even the TV signal was turned off by the workers. That flexible contract was retired and welfare state was increased. However, the strike did not prevent a third absolute majority by PSOE, whose leader, Felipe González, remained popular.

== Consequences of the 14-D strike ==
Some economists believe the strike was the cause of a large increase in public spending, which led to an increase in the budget deficit. Others prefer to attribute public spending to the 1992 Olympic Games held in Barcelona, the 1992 world fair in Seville, plus the first high-speed train, for the large budget deficit. The budget deficit led to spending cuts which, coupled with a tough monetary policy, led to a recession in 1993.

== Use of 14-D in other strikes ==
Several minority trade unions, including the students’ union, the anarchist Confederación Nacional del Trabajo (CNT), and the second-largest teachers’ union, STEC, called a strike in the education sector on 14 December 2005. The action sought to invoke the symbolic significance of 14-D, previously associated with left-led strikes, and to protest a proposed education law that increased public funding for private schools, many of which were Catholic. The strike attracted limited participation due to the absence of support from larger unions.

== Other important general strikes in modern Spain ==
- 1985 strike (24 hours): only called by CC.OO., one of the two main unions, against reforms in the pension system.
- 1991 strike (4 hours): against Gulf War.
- 1992 strike (8 hours): against labour market reforms.
- 1994 strike (24 hours): against labour market reforms.
- 2002 strike (24 hours): against labour market reforms.
- 2003 strike (2 hours): against Iraq War (only called by UGT).
- 2010 strike
- 2012 strike on 29 March

== See also ==
- Workers' Commissions
- Unión General de Trabajadores
- Confederación Nacional del Trabajo
- La Canadenca strike
- Marcelino Camacho
- Felipe González
