= 1989 Spanish general election =

- 29 October 1989 (Note: Elections re-runs took place in the constituencies of Melilla (Congress and Senate) on 25 March 1990 and Ávila (Senate) on 7 October 1990, as a result of the Constitutional Court annulling the original results due to election irregularities.)

All 350 seats in the Congress of Deputies and 208 (of 254) seats in the Senate 176 seats needed for a majority in the Congress of Deputies
- Opinion polls
- Registered: 29,604,055 ▲1.7%
- Turnout: 20,646,365 (69.7%) ▼0.8 pp

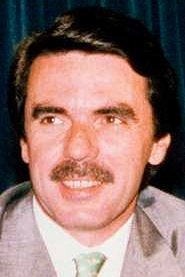

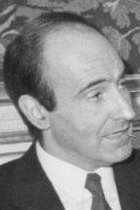

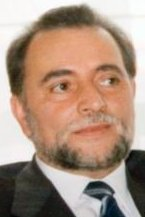

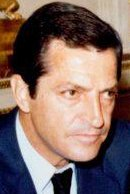

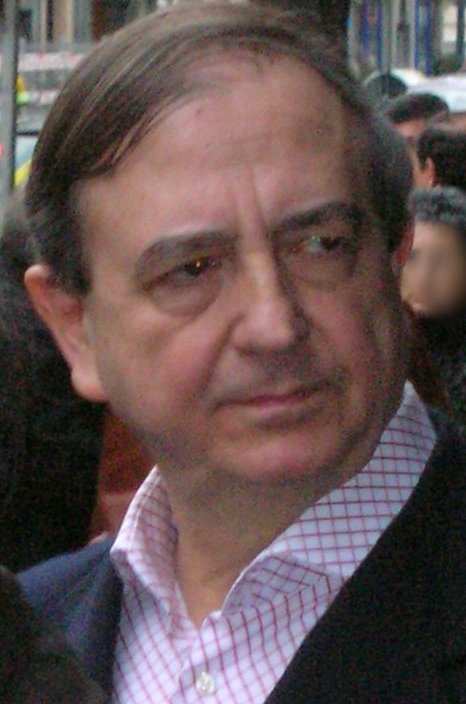
	First party	Second party	Third party
Leader	Felipe González	José María Aznar	Miquel Roca
Party	PSOE	PP	CiU
Leader since	28 September 1979	2 September 1989	4 July 1982
Leader's seat	Madrid	Madrid	Barcelona
Last election	184 seats, 44.1%	105 seats, 26.0% (Note: Results for AP–PDP–PL in the 1986 election.)	18 seats, 5.0%
Seats won	175	107	18
Seat change	▼9	▲2	0
Popular vote	8,115,568	5,285,972	1,032,243
Percentage	39.6%	25.8%	5.0%
Swing	▼4.5 pp	▼0.2 pp	0.0 pp
	Fourth party	Fifth party	Sixth party
Leader	Julio Anguita	Adolfo Suárez	Iñaki Anasagasti
Party	IU	CDS	EAJ/PNV
Leader since	12 February 1989	29 July 1982	1986
Leader's seat	Madrid	Madrid	Biscay
Last election	7 seats, 4.6%	19 seats, 9.2%	6 seats, 1.5%
Seats won	17	14	5
Seat change	▲10	▼5	▼1
Popular vote	1,858,588	1,617,716	254,681
Percentage	9.1%	7.9%	1.2%
Swing	▲4.5 pp	▼1.3 pp	▼0.3 pp
Prime Minister before election
Felipe González
PSOE
Prime Minister after election
Felipe González
PSOE

A general election was held in Spain on 29 October 1989 to elect the members of the 4th Cortes Generales under the Spanish Constitution of 1978. All 350 seats in the Congress of Deputies were up for election, as well as 208 of 254 seats in the Senate. An election had not been due until 28 July 1990 at latest, but Prime Minister Felipe González called for a snap election nine months ahead of schedule, allegedly on the need of implementing tough economic measures. González hoped to capitalize on a still strong economy and his party's electoral success in a European Parliament election held in June, after a troubled legislature which had seen an increase of social protest on his government's economic policy and the calling of a massive general strike in 1988.

The election was regarded as one of the most controversial in the democratic history of Spain. Close results in many constituencies, coupled with severe flaws in electoral register data, an inefficient structure of the electoral administration and the ongoing political struggle between the ruling Spanish Socialist Workers' Party (PSOE) and the opposition parties over the Socialist absolute majority in the Congress of Deputies, led to a major scandal when election results in a number of constituencies were contested under accusations of irregularities and fraud. Judicial courts were forced to intervene, determining by-elections for Murcia, Pontevedra and Melilla. The issue was appealed to the Constitutional Court of Spain, which overruled previous rulings and validated the vote in Melilla only, with a new election being held on 25 March 1990. In the end, the disputed seat was won by the People's Party (PP), depriving the PSOE of its 176th seat in Congress–and with it, the outright majority it had held since 1982.

The election saw an erosion in popular support for the incumbent Socialists, who nonetheless emerged again as the largest party by a decisive margin, with 68 more seats than the PP. As a result, Felipe González was able to be re-elected for a third consecutive term in office with confidence and supply support from the Canarian Independent Groups (AIC). The newly amalgamated PP, led into the election by José María Aznar, exceeded initial expectations and slightly improved on the People's Coalition 1986 result while performing better than in the June European Parliament election. Julio Anguita's left-wing alliance, United Left (IU), scored a remarkable success by doubling its 1986 totals, whereas Adolfo Suárez's Democratic and Social Centre (CDS) fell short of its goal of becoming a government alternative and lost votes and seats.

== Background ==
Felipe González's second term as prime minister was characterized by economic growth, with public investments favoured by the Structural Funds coming from the European Economic Community to which Spain had recently accessed. The GDP grew by around or above 5% between 1987 and 1989 and unemployment decreased from 20.6% to 16.9%. This period saw a consolidation of welfare system reforms initiated during González's first term, allowed through a better financing derived from a relatively progressive tax system. But the economic expansion fostered by the government's liberal policies brought about an increase in wealth differences and of inequality, leading to social unrest and a loss of popularity for the ruling Spanish Socialist Workers' Party (PSOE), made apparent in the local, regional and European Parliament elections. In December 1988, the two major trade unions in Spain, CCOO and UGT, called a general strike which succeeded in paralyzing the country and in forcing González's government to negotiate a partial withdrawal of its economic policies.

Concurrently, the opposition People's Alliance (AP) suffered from a profound internal crisis since the 1986 election, leading to the break up of the People's Coalition and the resignation of party leader Manuel Fraga. His successor, Antonio Hernández Mancha, proved unable to improve AP's electoral fortunes and saw his political credibility decimated after an unsuccessful attempt to bring down Felipe González through a motion of no confidence in March 1987. Hernández Mancha ended up quitting in early 1989, with Fraga returning as a caretaker leader who oversaw the merging of AP with its former allies, the People's Democratic Party (PDP) and the Liberal Party (PL), into the new People's Party (PP). Intending his national leadership as temporary, Fraga appointed a then-unknown President of Castile and León José María Aznar as his successor.

The 1986–1989 period saw an increase in the terror activity of the ETA Basque separatist group. This reached its peak with the Hipercor bombing on 19 June 1987, which—with 21 dead and 45 injured—would eventually become the deadliest attack in ETA's history. Other deadly attacks included the Plaza República Dominicana bombing on 14 July 1986, three weeks after the previous general election and one day before the newly elected Cortes re-assembled, which left 12 dead and 32 injured; and the 1987 Zaragoza Barracks bombing, with 11 dead—including 5 children—and 88 injured. Concurrently, the PSOE government introduced a policy of dispersion of imprisoned terrorists throughout the entire Spanish territory in order to restrict contacts between them and prevent terrorist organizations from organizing themselves from prison. Political parties signed several anti-terrorist agreements, such as the Ajuria Enea Pact or the Madrid Agreement on Terrorism, aimed at increasing inter-party cooperation on the issue. In January 1989, ETA declared a ceasefire in order to start negotiation talks in Algiers with the Socialist government, but no successful conclusion was reached and ETA resumed its violence campaign.

== Overview ==
Under the 1978 Constitution, the Spanish Cortes Generales were conceived as an imperfect bicameral system. The Congress of Deputies held greater legislative power than the Senate, having the ability to grant or withdraw confidence from a prime minister and to override Senate vetoes by an absolute majority. Nonetheless, the Senate retained a limited number of specific functions—such as ratifying international treaties, authorizing cooperation agreements between autonomous communities, enforcing direct rule, regulating interterritorial compensation funds, and taking part in constitutional amendments and in the appointment of members to the Constitutional Court and the General Council of the Judiciary—which were not subject to override by Congress.

=== Date ===
The term of each chamber of the Cortes Generales—the Congress and the Senate—expired four years from the date of their previous election, unless they were dissolved earlier. The election decree was required to be issued no later than 25 days before the scheduled expiration date of parliament and published on the following day in the Official State Gazette (BOE), with election day taking place between 54 and 60 days after the decree's publication. The previous election was held on 22 June 1986, which meant that the chambers' terms would have expired on 22 June 1990. The election decree was required to be published in the BOE no later than 29 May 1990, setting the latest possible date for election day on 28 July 1990.

The prime minister had the prerogative to propose the monarch to dissolve both chambers at any given time—either jointly or separately—and call a snap election, provided that no motion of no confidence was in process, no state of emergency was in force and that dissolution did not occur before one year after a previous one. Additionally, both chambers were to be dissolved and a new election called if an investiture process failed to elect a prime minister within a two-month period from the first ballot. Barring this exception, there was no constitutional requirement for simultaneous elections to the Congress and the Senate. Still, as of 2026, there has been no precedent of separate elections taking place under the 1978 Constitution.

While the opposition to the PSOE government had pressed for a snap election since the general strike in December 1988, it was not until the PSOE's success in the 1989 European Parliament election, the end of the Spanish rotational Presidency of the Council of the European Union in June and the need for tough economic measures before the end of the year that Prime Minister Felipe González chose to trigger an early dissolution of the Cortes. On 25 August 1989, governmental sources confirmed that González would be calling an autumn election in the following days.

The Cortes Generales were officially dissolved on 2 September 1989 with the publication of the corresponding decree in the BOE, setting election day for 29 October and scheduling for both chambers to reconvene on 21 November.

=== Electoral system ===
Voting for each chamber of the Cortes Generales was based on universal suffrage, comprising all Spanish nationals over 18 years of age with full political rights, provided that they had not been deprived of the right to vote by a final sentence, nor were legally incapacitated.

The Congress of Deputies had a minimum of 300 and a maximum of 400 seats, with electoral provisions fixing its size at 350. Of these, 348 were elected in 50 multi-member constituencies corresponding to the provinces of Spain—each of which was assigned an initial minimum of two seats and the remaining 248 distributed in proportion to population—using the D'Hondt method and closed-list proportional voting, with a three percent-threshold of valid votes (including blank ballots) in each constituency. The remaining two seats were allocated to Ceuta and Melilla as single-member districts elected by plurality voting. The use of this electoral method resulted in a higher effective threshold depending on district magnitude and vote distribution.

As a result of the aforementioned allocation, each Congress multi-member constituency was entitled the following seats:

Seats	Constituencies
33	Madrid
32	Barcelona^{(−1)}
16	Valencia
12	Seville
10	Alicante, Biscay, Málaga^{(+1)}
9	Asturias, Cádiz, La Coruña, Murcia^{(+1)}
8	Pontevedra
7	Córdoba, Granada, Guipúzcoa, Las Palmas, Santa Cruz de Tenerife^{(+1)}, Zaragoza^{(−1)}
6	Badajoz, Balearics, Jaén
5	Almería, Cáceres, Cantabria, Castellón, Ciudad Real, Gerona, Huelva, León, Lugo, Navarre, Orense, Tarragona, Toledo, Valladolid
4	Álava, Albacete, Burgos, La Rioja, Lérida, Salamanca
3	Ávila, Cuenca, Guadalajara, Huesca, Palencia, Segovia, Soria, Teruel, Zamora^{(−1)}

208 Senate seats were elected using open-list (Note: Parties could group candidates into lists, although each candidate was treated separately for the purpose of the voting procedure.) partial block voting: voters in constituencies electing four seats could choose up to three candidates; in those with two or three seats, up to two; and in single-member districts, one. Each of the 47 peninsular provinces was allocated four seats, while in insular provinces—such as the Balearic and Canary Islands—the districts were the islands themselves, with the larger ones (Mallorca, Gran Canaria and Tenerife) being allocated three seats each, and the smaller ones (Menorca, Ibiza–Formentera, Fuerteventura, La Gomera, El Hierro, Lanzarote and La Palma) one each. Ceuta and Melilla elected two seats each. Additionally, autonomous communities could appoint at least one senator each and were entitled to one additional seat per million inhabitants.

The law did not provide for by-elections to fill vacant seats; instead, any vacancies arising after the proclamation of candidates and during the legislative term were filled by the next candidates on the party lists or, when required, by designated substitutes.

=== Outgoing parliament ===
The tables below show the composition of the parliamentary groups in both chambers at the time of dissolution.

Parliamentary composition in September 1989
Congress of Deputies
Groups	Parties	Deputies	
Groups	Parties	Seats	Total
Socialist Parliamentary Group	PSOE	160	181
Socialist Parliamentary Group	PSC	21	181
People's Coalition Parliamentary Group	PP	86	89
People's Coalition Parliamentary Group	UPN	2	89
People's Coalition Parliamentary Group	CdG	1	89
CDS Parliamentary Group	CDS	28	28
Catalan Minority Parliamentary Group	CDC	13	19
Catalan Minority Parliamentary Group	UDC	5	19
Catalan Minority Parliamentary Group	INDEP	1 (Note: José Nicolás de Salas, former PL legislator.)	19
Basque Parliamentary Group (PNV)	EAJ/PNV	4	4
Mixed Parliamentary Group	PCE	4	24
Mixed Parliamentary Group	EE	2	24
Mixed Parliamentary Group	EA	2	24
Mixed Parliamentary Group	PCPE	1	24
Mixed Parliamentary Group	PSUC	1	24
Mixed Parliamentary Group	UV	1	24
Mixed Parliamentary Group	PAR	1	24
Mixed Parliamentary Group	AIC	1	24
Mixed Parliamentary Group	CG	1	24
Mixed Parliamentary Group	RD	1	24
Mixed Parliamentary Group	PAM	1	24
Mixed Parliamentary Group	INDEP	8 (Note: Pablo Hurtado, Enric Ribas and Virginio Sánchez Barberán, former PSOE legislators; Juan José Pérez Dobón and Pilar Salarrullana, former DC legislators; Adolfo Careaga and José Manuel Paredes, former PL legislators; José Luis Sánchez Usero, former AP legislator.)	24
Vacant	HB	5	5

Parliamentary composition in September 1989
Senate
Groups	Parties	Senators	
Groups	Parties	Seats	Total
Socialist Parliamentary Group	PSOE	135	145
Socialist Parliamentary Group	PSC	10	145
People's Parliamentary Group	PP	65	66
People's Parliamentary Group	CdG	1	66
CDS Parliamentary Group	CDS	11	11
Convergence and Union's; Catalan Parliamentary Group in the Senate	CDC	8	10
Convergence and Union's; Catalan Parliamentary Group in the Senate	UDC	2	10
Basque Nationalist Senators' Parliamentary Group	EAJ/PNV	6	6
Mixed Parliamentary Group	EA	3	15
Mixed Parliamentary Group	AIC	2	15
Mixed Parliamentary Group	PCE	1	15
Mixed Parliamentary Group	PSUC	1	15
Mixed Parliamentary Group	PAR	1	15
Mixed Parliamentary Group	AM	1	15
Mixed Parliamentary Group	INDEP	6 (Note: José María Bris, José María Herrero, Enrique Marfany and Julio Ulloa, former DC legislators; Pablo Tello, former PSOE legislator; Juan Antón Rueda, former AP legislator.)	15
Vacant	HB	1	1

== Candidates ==
=== Nomination rules ===
Spanish citizens with the right to vote could run for election, provided that they had not been criminally imprisoned by a final sentence or convicted—whether final or not—of offences that involved loss of eligibility or disqualification from public office (such as rebellion or terrorism, when involving crimes against life, physical integrity or personal freedom). Additional causes of ineligibility applied to the following officials:

- Members of the Spanish royal family and their spouses;
- Holders of a number of senior public or institutional posts, including the heads and members of higher courts and state institutions; (Note: These comprised the Constitutional Court, the General Council of the Judiciary, the Supreme Court, the Council of State and the Court of Auditors.) the Ombudsman; the State's Attorney General; high-ranking officials of government departments, the Office of the Prime Minister and other state agencies; government delegates in the autonomous communities and civil governors; the director-general of RTVE; the director of the Electoral Register Office; the governor and deputy governor of the Bank of Spain; the heads of official credit institutions; and members of electoral commissions and of the Nuclear Safety Council;
- Heads of diplomatic missions abroad;
- Judges and public prosecutors in active service;
- Members of the Armed Forces and law enforcement bodies in active service.

Other ineligibility provisions also applied to a number of territorial officials in these categories within their areas of jurisdiction, as well as to employees of foreign states and members of regional governments.

Incompatibility rules included those of ineligibility, and also barred running in multiple constituencies, and combining legislative roles (deputy, senator, and regional lawmaker) with each other or with:

- A number of senior public or institutional posts, including the presidency of the Competition Defence Court; and leadership positions in RTVE, government offices, public authorities (such as port authorities, hydrographic confederations, or highway concessionary companies), public entities and state-owned or publicly funded companies;
- Any other paid public position, except university teaching.

=== Parties and lists ===
The electoral law allowed for parties and federations registered in the interior ministry, alliances and groupings of electors to present lists of candidates. Parties and federations intending to form an alliance were required to inform the relevant electoral commission within 10 days of the election call, whereas groupings of electors needed to secure the signature of at least one percent of the electorate in the constituencies for which they sought election, disallowing electors from signing for more than one list.

Below is a list of the main parties and alliances which contested the election:

Candidacy	Parties and alliances	Leading candidate	Ideology	Previous result				Gov.	Ref.
Candidacy	Parties and alliances	Leading candidate	Ideology	Congress		Senate		Gov.	Ref.
Candidacy	Parties and alliances	Leading candidate	Ideology	Vote %	Seats	Vote %	Seats	Gov.	Ref.
PSOE	List: Spanish Socialist Workers' Party (PSOE); Socialists' Party of Catalonia (PSC)	Felipe González	Social democracy	44.1%	184	44.5%	124	Yes	
PP	List: People's Party (PP); Navarrese People's Union (UPN); Centrists of Galicia (CdG)	José María Aznar	Conservatism; Christian democracy	26.0%	105	26.1%	63	No	
CDS	List: Democratic and Social Centre (CDS)	Adolfo Suárez	Centrism; Liberalism	9.2%	19	8.2%	3	No	
CiU	List: Democratic Convergence of Catalonia (CDC); Democratic Union of Catalonia (UDC)	Miquel Roca	Catalan nationalism Centrism	5.0%	18	5.3%	8	No	
IU	List: Communist Party of Spain (PCE); Socialist Action Party (PASOC); Republican Left (IR); United Candidacy of Workers (CUT); Initiative for Catalonia (IC) – Unified Socialist Party of Catalonia (PSUC) – Agreement of Left Nationalists (ENE)	Julio Anguita	Socialism; Communism	4.6%	7	4.7%	0	No	
EAJ/PNV	List: Basque Nationalist Party (EAJ/PNV)	Iñaki Anasagasti	Basque nationalism Christian democracy	1.5%	6	1.7%	7	No	
HB	List: Popular Unity (HB) – People's Socialist Revolutionary Party (HASI) – Basque Nationalist Action (EAE/ANV) – Patriotic Socialist Committees (ASK)	Iñaki Esnaola	Basque independence Abertzale left Revolutionary socialism	1.1%	5	1.2%	1	No	
EE	List: Basque Country Left (EE)	Koro Garmendia	Basque nationalism Social democracy	0.5%	2	0.6%	0	No	
CG	List: Galician Coalition (CG)	Senén Bernárdez	Galician nationalism Centrism	0.4%	1	0.4%	0	No	
PAR	List: Regionalist Aragonese Party (PAR)	José María Mur	Regionalism; Centrism	0.4%	1	0.5%	0	No	
AIC	List: Tenerife Group of Independents (ATI); La Palma Group of Independents (API); Gomera Group of Independents (AGI); Independents of Fuerteventura (IF); Lanzarote Independents Party (PIL)	Manuel Hermoso	Regionalism; Canarian nationalism Conservatism	0.3%	1	0.2%	1	No	
UV	List: Valencian Union (UV)	Vicente González Lizondo	Blaverism; Conservatism	0.3%	1	0.4%	0	No	
PA	List: Andalusian Party (PA)	Alejandro Rojas-Marcos	Andalusian nationalism Social democracy	0.5%	0	0.5%	0	No	
EA	List: Basque Solidarity (EA)	Joseba Azcarraga	Basque nationalism Social democracy	Did not contest				No	

The People's Party (PP) and Navarrese People's Union (UPN) signed a coalition agreement on 8 September 1989 to run together in Navarre, renewing the alliance in existence between the PP's predecessors, the People's Alliance (AP) and the People's Coalition (CP), and UPN, in both the 1982 and 1986 elections.

== Campaign ==
=== Party slogans ===
Party or alliance	Original slogan	English translation	Ref.
PSOE	« España, en progreso »	"Spain, in progress"	
PP	« ¡Palabra! »	"Promise!"	
CDS	« Capaces de hacerlo »	"[We are] capable of doing it"	
IU	« Somos la alternativa »	"We are the alternative"	
CiU	« Força! »	"Forward!"	

=== Events and issues ===
Despite Aznar's designation as PP candidate, the opposition remained divided and weak on the road to the 1989 election. This, coupled with a buoyant economy, made a new PSOE victory inevitable. The electoral campaign, thus, focused on whether the Socialists would be able to maintain their absolute majority on the Congress of Deputies for a third term in office. United Left had also appointed a new leader, Julio Anguita, and had high expectations to increase their parliamentary representation from the 7 seats they had won in 1986. During the campaign, Felipe González pledged that this would be the last time he would stand for the office of Prime Minister. He would eventually stand for two more elections, until 1996.

== Voter turnout ==
The table below shows registered voter turnout during the election. Figures for election day do not include non-resident citizens, while final figures do.

Region	Time (Election day)									Final		
Region	14:00			18:00			20:00			Final		
Region	1986	1989	+/–	1986	1989	+/–	1986	1989	+/–	1986	1989	+/–
Andalusia	39.24%	34.43%	−4.81	56.57%	55.25%	−1.32	71.11%	69.46%	−1.65	70.77%	69.33%	−1.44
Aragon	42.54%	37.60%	−4.94	56.78%	56.33%	−0.45	70.86%	70.31%	−0.55	70.59%	70.21%	−0.38
Asturias	40.16%	36.73%	−3.43	57.05%	57.22%	+0.17	68.79%	69.13%	+0.34	67.82%	68.90%	+1.08
Balearics	38.36%	34.63%	−3.73	50.73%	50.40%	−0.33	66.16%	63.59%	−2.57	66.02%	63.54%	−2.48
Basque Country	41.42%	35.89%	−5.53	54.67%	52.92%	−1.75	67.84%	67.00%	−0.84	67.58%	66.90%	−0.68
Canary Islands	39.12%	27.65%	−11.47	56.25%	45.05%	−11.20	68.72%	62.31%	−6.41	68.28%	62.15%	−6.13
Cantabria	43.32%	36.59%	−6.73	61.35%	59.16%	−2.19	73.97%	74.51%	+0.54	73.43%	74.28%	+0.85
Castile and León	41.88%	37.70%	−4.18	60.70%	59.61%	−1.09	73.40%	73.59%	+0.19	72.81%	73.35%	+0.54
Castilla–La Mancha	43.40%	39.10%	−4.30	60.15%	62.19%	+2.04	75.29%	76.54%	+1.25	75.09%	76.44%	+1.35
Catalonia	41.27%	36.27%	−5.00	53.51%	54.52%	+1.01	69.19%	67.71%	−1.48	68.95%	67.62%	−1.33
Extremadura	45.50%	40.83%	−4.67	60.52%	60.67%	+0.15	73.91%	75.72%	+1.81	73.58%	75.57%	+1.99
Galicia	28.22%	27.91%	−0.31	45.77%	49.17%	+3.40	59.18%	60.80%	+1.62	57.89%	60.13%	+2.24
La Rioja	47.80%	39.42%	−8.38	61.64%	57.64%	−4.00	74.74%	72.21%	−2.53	74.31%	72.04%	−2.27
Madrid	40.88%	34.70%	−6.18	59.72%	58.64%	−1.08	74.31%	72.88%	−1.43	73.90%	72.72%	−1.18
Murcia	45.38%	39.19%	−6.19	59.20%	61.27%	+2.07	74.92%	74.41%	−0.51	74.66%	74.25%	−0.41
Navarre	43.24%	34.07%	−9.17	56.32%	53.38%	−2.94	70.26%	68.72%	−1.54	69.80%	68.54%	−1.26
Valencian Community	48.05%	41.92%	−6.13	62.53%	62.16%	−0.37	76.62%	74.93%	−1.69	76.40%	74.80%	−1.60
Ceuta	n/a	30.23%	n/a	46.93%	45.86%	−1.07	57.22%	56.14%	−1.08	56.70%	55.94%	−0.76
Melilla (Note: 1989 turnout figures in Melilla correspond to the March 1990 re-run.)	37.32%	30.82%	−6.50	50.98%	46.96%	−4.02	60.68%	51.97%	−8.71	59.98%	51.89%	−8.09
Total	40.90%	35.78%	−5.12	56.73%	56.20%	−0.53	70.93%	69.93%	−1.00	70.49%	69.74%	−0.75

== Results ==
=== Congress of Deputies ===
← Summary of the 29 October 1989 Congress of Deputies election results →
Parties and alliances	Popular vote			Seats	
Parties and alliances	Votes	%	±pp	Total	+/−
Spanish Socialist Workers' Party (PSOE)^{1}	8,115,568	39.60	−4.46	175	−9
People's Party (PP)^{1} ^{2}	5,285,972	25.79	−0.18	107	+2
United Left (IU)	1,858,588	9.07	+4.44	17	+10
Democratic and Social Centre (CDS)	1,617,716	7.89	−1.33	14	−5
Convergence and Union (CiU)	1,032,243	5.04	+0.02	18	±0
Basque Nationalist Party (EAJ/PNV)	254,681	1.24	−0.29	5	−1
Ruiz-Mateos Group (Ruiz-Mateos)	219,883	1.07	New	0	±0
Popular Unity (HB)	217,278	1.06	−0.09	4	−1
Andalusian Party (PA)	212,687	1.04	+0.57	2	+2
Green List (LV)	158,034	0.77	+0.61	0	±0
The Greens–Green List (LV–LV)	157,103	0.77	+0.61	0	±0
Ecologist Party of the Basque Country (PEE–(LV))	931	0.00	New	0	±0
Valencian Union (UV)	144,924	0.71	New	2	+1
Basque Solidarity (EA)	136,955	0.67	New	2	+2
The Ecologist Greens (LVE)	136,335	0.67	New	0	±0
Basque Country Left (EE)	105,238	0.51	−0.02	2	±0
Workers' Party of Spain–Communist Unity (PTE–UC)^{3}	86,257	0.42	−0.72	0	±0
Republican Left of Catalonia (ERC)	84,756	0.41	−0.01	0	±0
Workers' Socialist Party (PST)	81,218	0.40	+0.01	0	±0
Regionalist Aragonese Party (PAR)	71,733	0.35	−0.01	1	±0
Canarian Independent Groups (AIC)	64,767	0.32	−0.01	1	±0
Communist Party of the Peoples of Spain (PCPE)	62,664	0.31	New	0	±0
Galician Nationalist Bloc (BNG)	47,763	0.23	+0.10	0	±0
Galician Coalition (CG)	45,821	0.22	−0.18	0	−1
Valencian People's Union (UPV)	40,767	0.20	±0.00	0	±0
Galician Socialist Party–Galician Left (PSG–EG)	34,131	0.17	−0.06	0	±0
Green Alternative–Ecologist Movement of Catalonia (AV–MEC)^{4}	25,978	0.13	−0.02	0	±0
Spanish Phalanx of the CNSO (FE–JONS)	24,025	0.12	−0.10	0	±0
Canarian Nationalist Assembly (ACN)^{5}	21,539	0.11	−0.07	0	±0
Spanish Vertex Ecological Development Revindication (VERDE)	21,235	0.10	−0.04	0	±0
Social Democratic Coalition (CSD)^{6}	17,095	0.08	+0.06	0	±0
Humanist Party (PH)	15,936	0.08	New	0	±0
Galician Nationalist Party–Galicianist Party (PNG–PG)	14,411	0.07	New	0	±0
Alliance for the Republic (AxR)^{7}	12,807	0.06	−0.05	0	±0
United Extremadura (EU)	10,984	0.05	−0.03	0	±0
Nationalist Left (PSM–ENE)	7,989	0.04	±0.00	0	±0
Revolutionary Workers' Party of Spain (PORE)	7,906	0.04	+0.01	0	±0
Independents of Gran Canaria (IGC)	6,371	0.03	New	0	±0
Asturianist Party (PAS)	5,414	0.03	New	0	±0
Centrist Unity–Democratic Spanish Party (PED)	4,942	0.02	+0.01	0	±0
Galician People's Front (FPG)	3,657	0.02	New	0	±0
Regional Party of Madrid (PAM)	3,396	0.02	New	0	±0
Group of Madrid Radicals (GRM)	3,330	0.02	New	0	±0
Asturian Nationalist Unity (UNA)	3,218	0.02	New	0	±0
Aragonese Union (UA–CHA)	3,156	0.02	New	0	±0
Valencian Nationalist Left–Valencian Regional Union (ENV–URV)	2,988	0.01	±0.00	0	±0
Regionalist Party of the Leonese Country (PREPAL)	2,962	0.01	±0.00	0	±0
Balearic Union (UB)	2,883	0.01	New	0	±0
United Ceuta (CEU)	2,760	0.01	New	0	±0
7 Green Stars (SEV)	1,411	0.01	New	0	±0
Green Movement (MV)	1,368	0.01	New	0	±0
Independent Citizen Group (ACI)	1,359	0.01	New	0	±0
Nationalist Party of Castile and León (PANCAL)	1,199	0.01	±0.00	0	±0
Cantonalist Party of the Alicantine Country (Alicantón)	1,041	0.01	New	0	±0
Spanish Democratic Republican Action (ARDE)	975	0.00	New	0	±0
Radicals for Cantabria (RxC)	904	0.00	New	0	±0
Independent Spanish Phalanx (FEI)	827	0.00	New	0	±0
Lanzarote Assembly (Tagoror)	472	0.00	New	0	±0
Regionalist Party of Guadalajara (PRGU)	426	0.00	New	0	±0
Balearic Radical Party (PRB)	398	0.00	New	0	±0
Spanish Nationalist Party of Melilla (PNEM)	301	0.00	New	0	±0
Proverist Party (PPr)	245	0.00	±0.00	0	±0
Revolutionary Communist League–Communist Movement (LCR–MC)^{8}	0	0.00	±0.00	0	±0
Communist Party of Spain (Marxist–Leninist) (PCE (m–l))^{9}	0	0.00	−0.14	0	±0
Blank ballots	141,795	0.69	+0.09		
Total	20,493,682			350	±0
Valid votes	20,493,682	99.26	+0.83		
Invalid votes	152,683	0.74	−0.83		
Votes cast / turnout	20,646,365	69.74	−0.75		
Abstentions	8,957,690	30.26	+0.75		
Registered voters	29,604,055				
Sources
Footnotes: ^{1} Initial projected results were PSOE 176 seats and PP 106. After results in Melilla were declared void and a by-election held on 25 March 1990, the PP took 1 additional seat from PSOE.; ^{2} People's Party results are compared to People's Coalition totals in the 1986 election.; ^{3} Workers' Party of Spain–Communist Unity results are compared to Communists' Unity Board totals in the 1986 election.; ^{4} Green Alternative–Ecologist Movement of Catalonia results are compared to Green Alternative List totals in the 1986 election.; ^{5} Canarian Nationalist Assembly results are compared to Canarian Assembly–Canarian Nationalist Left totals in the 1986 election.; ^{6} Social Democratic Coalition results are compared to Social Democratic Party of Catalonia totals in the 1986 election.; ^{7} Alliance for the Republic results are compared to Internationalist Socialist Workers' Party totals in the 1986 election.; ^{8} Revolutionary Communist League–Communist Movement results are compared to the combined totals of Communist Movement of the Basque Country and Revolutionary Communist League in the 1986 election.; ^{9} Communist Party of Spain (Marxist–Leninist) results are compared to Republican Popular Unity totals in the 1986 election.

Popular vote
PSOE	39.60%
PP	25.79%
IU	9.07%
CDS	7.89%
CiU	5.04%
EAJ/PNV	1.24%
Ruiz-Mateos	1.07%
HB	1.06%
PA	1.04%
UV	0.71%
EA	0.67%
EE	0.51%
PAR	0.35%
AIC	0.32%
Others	4.95%
Blank ballots	0.69%

Seats
PSOE	50.00%
PP	30.57%
CiU	5.14%
IU	4.86%
CDS	4.00%
EAJ/PNV	1.43%
HB	1.14%
PA	0.57%
UV	0.57%
EA	0.57%
EE	0.57%
PAR	0.29%
AIC	0.29%

=== Senate ===
← Summary of the 29 October 1989 Senate of Spain election results →
Parties and alliances	Popular vote			Seats	
Parties and alliances	Votes	%	±pp	Total	+/−
Spanish Socialist Workers' Party (PSOE)^{1}	22,272,484	40.14	−4.38	107	−17
People's Party (PP)^{1} ^{2}	14,459,290	26.06	−0.03	78	+15
United Left (IU)	4,866,930	8.77	+4.12	1	+1
Democratic and Social Centre (CDS)^{1}	4,218,268	7.60	−0.57	1	−2
Convergence and Union (CiU)	2,937,029	5.29	+0.01	10	+2
Basque Nationalist Party (EAJ/PNV)	742,058	1.34	−0.34	4	−3
Andalusian Party (PA)	638,137	1.15	+0.61	0	±0
Popular Unity (HB)	631,299	1.14	−0.08	3	+2
Basque Solidarity (EA)	398,922	0.72	New	0	±0
Ruiz-Mateos Group (Ruiz-Mateos)	391,939	0.71	New	0	±0
Valencian Union (UV)	336,379	0.61	+0.20	0	±0
The Ecologist Greens (LVE)	300,390	0.54	New	0	±0
Basque Country Left (EE)	299,794	0.54	−0.02	0	±0
The Greens–Green List (LV–LV)	273,310	0.49	+0.29	0	±0
Workers' Party of Spain–Communist Unity (PTE–UC)^{3}	267,683	0.48	−0.69	0	±0
Aragonese Party (PAR)	239,550	0.43	−0.03	0	±0
Republican Left of Catalonia (ERC)	239,532	0.43	−0.03	0	±0
Communists in the Senate Coalition (CS)	151,563	0.27	New	0	±0
Galician Nationalist Bloc (BNG)	144,544	0.26	+0.11	0	±0
Galician Coalition (CG)	133,989	0.24	−0.19	0	±0
Valencian People's Union (UPV)	133,327	0.24	−0.01	0	±0
Workers' Socialist Party (PST)	124,597	0.22	+0.07	0	±0
Canarian Independent Groups (AIC)	113,524	0.20	−0.03	2	+1
Galician Socialist Party–Galician Left (PSG–EG)	101,432	0.18	−0.06	0	±0
Spanish Vertex Ecological Development Revindication (VERDE)	99,949	0.18	−0.09	0	±0
Green Alternative–Ecologist Movement of Catalonia (AV–MEC)^{4}	85,078	0.15	+0.02	0	±0
Spanish Phalanx of the CNSO (FE–JONS)	71,859	0.13	−0.19	0	±0
Galician Nationalist Party–Galicianist Party (PNG–PG)	58,054	0.10	New	0	±0
United Extremadura (EU)	44,872	0.08	−0.03	0	±0
Canarian Nationalist Assembly (ACN)^{5}	39,568	0.07	−0.02	0	±0
Humanist Party (PH)	39,436	0.07	New	0	±0
Regional Party of Madrid (PAM)	23,998	0.04	New	0	±0
Alliance for the Republic (AxR)^{6}	23,692	0.04	±0.00	0	±0
Lanzarote Independents Group (AIL)	17,768	0.03	+0.01	0	±0
Spanish Catholic Movement (MCE)	17,588	0.03	New	0	±0
Asturianist Party (PAS)	17,380	0.03	New	0	±0
Nationalist Left (PSM–ENE)	15,814	0.03	±0.00	0	±0
Regionalist Party of the Leonese Country (PREPAL)	15,742	0.03	+0.01	0	±0
Asturian People's Union (UPA)	13,977	0.03	New	0	±0
Group of Madrid Radicals (GRM)	13,576	0.02	New	0	±0
Aragonese Union (UA–CHA)	12,282	0.02	New	0	±0
Independents of Gran Canaria (IGC)	12,138	0.02	New	0	±0
Asturian Nationalist Unity (UNA)	10,956	0.02	New	0	±0
Independent Solution (SI)	9,910	0.02	New	0	±0
Nationalist Party of Castile and León (PANCAL)	8,694	0.02	+0.01	0	±0
Revolutionary Workers' Party of Spain (PORE)	7,301	0.01	−0.03	0	±0
Natural Culture (CN)	6,633	0.01	−0.01	0	±0
Galician People's Front (FPG)	6,249	0.01	New	0	±0
Balearic Union (UB)	6,054	0.01	New	0	±0
United Ceuta (CEU)	5,462	0.01	New	0	±0
Centrist Unity–Democratic Spanish Party (PED)	5,434	0.01	New	0	±0
Majorera Assembly (AM)	5,268	0.01	±0.00	1	±0
Spanish Democratic Republican Action (ARDE)	5,016	0.01	New	0	±0
Alicanton Alicantine Coalition (COA)	4,099	0.01	New	0	±0
Liberal and Social Democratic Coalition (CSD y L)^{7}	3,269	0.01	±0.00	0	±0
Regionalist Party of Castilla–La Mancha (PRCM)	3,267	0.01	New	0	±0
Valencian Nationalist Left–Valencian Regional Union (ENV–URV)	2,989	0.01	±0.00	0	±0
Radicals for Cantabria (RxC)	2,977	0.01	New	0	±0
Independent Citizen Group (ACI)	2,846	0.01	New	0	±0
Independent Spanish Phalanx (FEI)	2,259	0.00	New	0	±0
Proverist Party (PPr)	2,053	0.00	−0.01	0	±0
Regionalist Party of Guadalajara (PRGU)	1,819	0.00	New	0	±0
Independents of Almeria and Province (IAYP)	1,576	0.00	New	0	±0
Seven Green Stars (SEV)	1,402	0.00	New	0	±0
Independent Herrenian Group (AHI)	1,219	0.00	New	1	+1
Lanzarote Assembly (Tagoror)	607	0.00	New	0	±0
Balearic Radical Party (PRB)	569	0.00	New	0	±0
Spanish Nationalist Party of Melilla (PNEM)	551	0.00	New	0	±0
Spanish Action (AE)	444	0.00	New	0	±0
Blank ballots (Note: The percentage of blank ballots is calculated over the official number of valid votes cast, irrespective of the total number of votes shown as a result of adding up the individual results for each party.)	334,118	1.67	+0.10		
Total	55,481,782			208	±0
Valid votes	19,974,111	96.57	−0.11		
Invalid votes	710,101	3.43	+0.11		
Votes cast / turnout	20,684,212	69.87	−0.45		
Abstentions	8,919,843	30.13	+0.45		
Registered voters	29,604,055				
Sources
Footnotes: ^{1} Initial projected results were PSOE 109 seats, PP 74 and CDS 3. After results in Melilla and Ávila were declared void and by-elections held on 25 March and 7 October 1990, respectively, the PP took 4 additional seats from PSOE (2) and CDS (2).; ^{2} People's Party results are compared to People's Coalition totals in the 1986 election.; ^{3} Workers' Party of Spain–Communist Unity results are compared to Communists' Unity Board totals in the 1986 election.; ^{4} Green Alternative–Ecologist Movement of Catalonia results are compared to Green Alternative List totals in the 1986 election.; ^{5} Canarian Nationalist Assembly results are compared to Canarian Assembly–Canarian Nationalist Left totals in the 1986 election.; ^{6} Alliance for the Republic results are compared to Internationalist Socialist Workers' Party totals in the 1986 election.; ^{7} Liberal and Social Democratic Coalition results are compared to Social Democratic Party of Catalonia totals in the 1986 election.

Popular vote
PSOE	40.14%
PP	26.06%
IU	8.77%
CDS	7.60%
CiU	5.29%
EAJ/PNV	1.34%
PA	1.15%
HB	1.14%
AIC	0.20%
AM	0.01%
AHI	0.00%
Others	7.68%
Blank ballots	1.67%

Seats
PSOE	51.44%
PP	37.50%
CiU	4.81%
EAJ/PNV	1.92%
HB	1.44%
AIC	0.96%
IU	0.48%
CDS	0.48%
AM	0.48%
AHI	0.48%

=== Maps ===
Election results by constituency (Congress).

Vote winner strength by constituency (Congress).

Vote winner strength by autonomous community (Congress).

== Aftermath ==
=== Outcome ===
The 1989 election night was one of the most dramatic since González's first victory in 1982, as PSOE's overall majority in the Congress of Deputies—set at 176—lingered during the entire vote tally. Exit polls and initial counts showed the PSOE below the majority threshold—with as few as 170 seats in some projections—. As the vote tally progressed, the party was allocated more seats, and with 98% of the votes counted at 4 am it was awarded the decisive 176th seat. Earlier in the night, the party's Secretary for Organization Txiki Benegas, Deputy Prime Minister Alfonso Guerra and González himself had commented that, notwithstanding the outcome, the PSOE still remained the largest party by far and would lead the new government on its own, rejecting any coalition deal. The tight result could not hide the loss of nearly 800,000 voters and a clear erosion in support since 1986, which led opposition parties and some international media—such as the Financial Times, The Independent or The Times—to ask González for a change of direction in government, accusing him of acting "arrogantly" during his previous seven years in office.

PP candidate José María Aznar found his party's results as "satisfactory", slightly improving on Fraga's result in 1986. Additionally, the PP had won the election in Madrid for the first time ever, considered as a symbolical feat as both Aznar and González were personally leading their parties's lists in the constituency. IU experienced a remarkable growth by doubling its 1986 results, with its leaders highlighting "the electorate's displacement to the left". On the other hand, the CDS lost votes and seats compared to 1986 and its result was commented as "not the one I expected for" by party leader Adolfo Suárez, who also acknowledged his public image had "deteriorated" in recent times. The breakdown of results would show a noticeable transfer of votes from the PSOE to IU in industrial and urban areas, with the Socialists holding their own in rural constituencies.

=== Irregularities and judicial intervention ===
During the days after the election, the 176th seat determining the PSOE's absolute majority remained in dispute. PP leaders voiced their concerns over a delay in the Ministry of the Interior's presentation of detailed results during the election night, during which the PSOE was awarded several seats by very few votes in the later stages of the vote tally; seats which ultimately proved decisive for the PSOE retaining its majority. In Barcelona, the PP claimed that its own tallies awarded the PSC–PSOE up to 5,000 votes less than those officially acknowledged by the Ministry, which would have resulted in them winning a 4th seat in the province from the PSC. Additionally, they alleged that this seat had changed hands from the PP to the PSC only when 99.98% of the votes were counted. IU's Julio Anguita criticized the vote tally, openly questioning that "How can [PSOE] go from 172 to 176 seats so fast?". IU announced that they would ask the Electoral Commission to review the voting records of 1,087 polling station wards in the constituency of Murcia, where the last seat had been allocated to PSOE from IU by a narrow margin of 96 votes.

PP claims in Barcelona were cast off after the tally of Spaniards voting abroad gave an even larger margin for the PSC and secured their 14th seat in the constituency. On 5 November, the Electoral Commission found irregularities in Murcia after determining that the number of voters and of ballot papers did not match up in fifteen wards. The new provisional results published on 6 November, which did not include the wards where irregularities had been found, awarded the last seat to PSOE by just two votes. Some IU members openly accused the PSOE of fraud, claiming that Socialist intervenors had voted twice in some wards not just in Murcia, but also in Málaga, Madrid and La Rioja—where, however, election results had not been contested—. A new tally on 11 November in Murcia resulted in the Commission awarding the seat to IU, which prompted a PSOE appeal to the Superior Court of Justice of Murcia. Concurrently, both the PP and the CDS alleged to have found irregularities in several polling stations in Melilla and Pontevedra, where seats had been awarded to PSOE by just a handful of votes, and asked for the vote to be annulled in those constituencies. The chaotic situation was further aggravated when, on 22 November, the PP denounced that it had found cases of name duplicity in the electoral register of Ceuta, with the party also demanding for the election to be repeated in Murcia after denouncing irregular procedures by the Electoral Commission during the vote tally. The Spanish Attorney General, Javier Moscoso, claimed on 24 November that Murcia's disputed seat belonged to PSOE. On 1 December, the Superior Court of Murcia annulled the election results in the constituency and required the government to call a by-election within three months.

The judicial decision in Murcia raised speculation in other constituencies where results had been appealed that the local Superior Courts would issue similar rulings. This happened in Pontevedra, where the number of counted votes exceeded the number of voters. Finally, the Superior Court of Andalusia annulled the election results in Melilla, but dismissed the appeal on Ceuta where it declared their validity. González's government announced that it would appeal the decision to the Constitutional Court which, on 25 January 1990, provisionally suspended the scheduled re-run elections in Murcia, Pontevedra and Melilla. From 15 to 19 February, the Court overruled the Superior Courts of Justice of Murcia and Galicia and cancelled the re-run elections on Murcia and Pontevedra, declaring the 29 October results as valid and final. For Melilla, it determined that the scale of the detected irregularities was such that the re-run election was required to proceed. The election in Melilla on 25 March 1990 gave the constituency's single deputy and its two senators to the PP, thus reducing the PSOE's deputy count to 175. A re-run election was also held on 7 October 1990 in a polling station in Mamblas, Ávila, as the consequence of a judicial conflict between the PP and the CDS over one senator in the constituency, which resulted in the PP winning the disputed senator from the CDS.

Irregularities were found to be a consequence of flawed electoral registers, lack of knowledge on election rules by those appointed to integrate the polling bureaus, a lack of means for the active monitoring of the election process and an inefficient structure of the electoral administration, all of which was coupled with the detection of some illicit votes in several wards. While these flaws had been present in past elections, the closeness of results in the 1989 election and the fact that the PSOE overall majority relied on a single seat meant that these were abruptly exposed. As a result, the electoral law was subsequently amended in 1991 in order to improve the efficiency of the electoral administration.

=== Government formation ===
Investiture; Congress of Deputies; Nomination of Felipe González (PSOE)
Ballot →	5 December 1989
Required majority →	167 out of 332
Yes: • PSOE (166); • AIC (1)	167 / 332
No: • PP (99); • CiU (18); • IU–IC (17); • CDS (13); • PA (2); • UV (2); • EA (2); • EE (2)	155 / 332
Abstentions: • PNV (5); • PAR (1)	6 / 332
Absentees: • HB (4)	4 / 332

On 5 December 1989, Felipe González was re-elected as prime minister in the first round of voting with an absolute majority of votes. Although the PSOE had lost its outright majority, due to Herri Batasuna's four deputies declining to take their seats, it had a majority among those deputies who did attend.

As a consequence of seat disputes, only 332 deputies had been sworn in for the investiture, as results for the remaining 18 seats had been temporarily suspended by the Superior Courts. After all 350 seats had been allocated, Prime Minister Felipe González voluntarily submitted himself to a vote of confidence to rectify the atypical investiture vote. The result was essentially a repeat of the December 1989 voting, with some parties previously voting 'No' choosing to abstain. González's parliamentary support remained the same as it was.

Motion of confidence Congress of Deputies; General Policy Statement (Prime Minister)
Ballot →	5 April 1990
Required majority →	Simple
Yes: • PSOE (175); • AIC (1)	176 / 350
No: • PP (105); • IU–IC (16); • PA (2); • UV (2); • EA (2); • EE (2); • PAR (1)	130 / 350
Abstentions: • CiU (18); • CDS (14); • PNV (5)	37 / 350
Absentees: • HB (4); • PP (2); • IU–IC (1)	7 / 350

== Bibliography ==
Legislation

- Constitución Española (Constitution). Official State Gazette (in Spanish). 27 December 1978 [version as of 29 December 1978]. BOE-A-1978-31229.
- Ley Orgánica 5/1985, de 19 de junio, del Régimen Electoral General (Organic Law 5/1985). Official State Gazette (in Spanish). 19 June 1985 [version as of 3 April 1987]. BOE-A-1985-11672.
- Real Decreto 1047/1989, de 1 de septiembre, de disolución del Congreso de los Diputados y del Senado y de convocatoria de elecciones (Royal Decree 1047/1989). Official State Gazette (in Spanish). 1 September 1989. BOE-A-1989-21483.

Other

- Carreras de Odriozola, Albert; Tafunell Sambola, Xavier (2005) [1989]. Estadísticas históricas de España, siglos XIX-XX (PDF) (in Spanish). Vol. 1 (II ed.). Bilbao: Fundación BBVA. pp. 1072–1097. ISBN 84-96515-00-1. Archived from the original (PDF) on 24 September 2015.
