= Mamblas =

- municipality
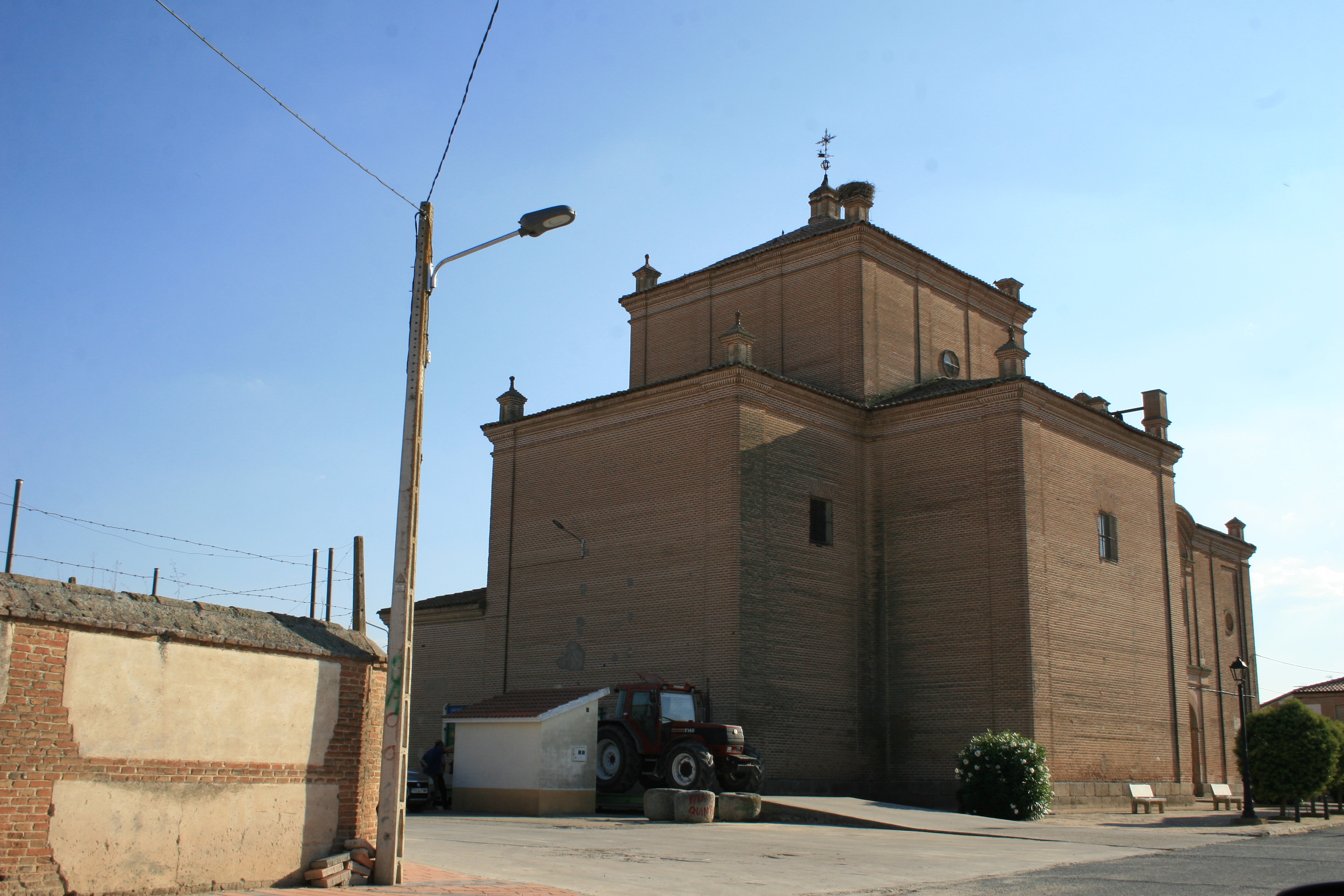
- Church of Mamblas

- Flag Coat of arms

- Location in Spain. Mamblas (Spain)
- Coordinates: 41°01′10″N 5°00′40″W
- Country: Spain
- Autonomous community: Castile and León
- Province: Ávila
- Municipality: Mamblas

Area
  - Total: 24 km^{2} (9.3 sq mi)

Population (2025-01-01)
  - Total: 191
  - Density: 8.0/km^{2} (21/sq mi)
- Time zone: UTC+1 (CET)
  - Summer (DST): UTC+2 (CEST)
- Website: Official website

Mamblas is a municipality located in the province of Ávila, Castile and León, Spain.

== Population ==
Historical population
Year	Pop.	±% p.a.
2023	197	—
2024	196	−0.51%
2025	191	−2.55%
Source: INE
