= Buenaventura Durruti =

Spanish anarchist militant (1896–1936)

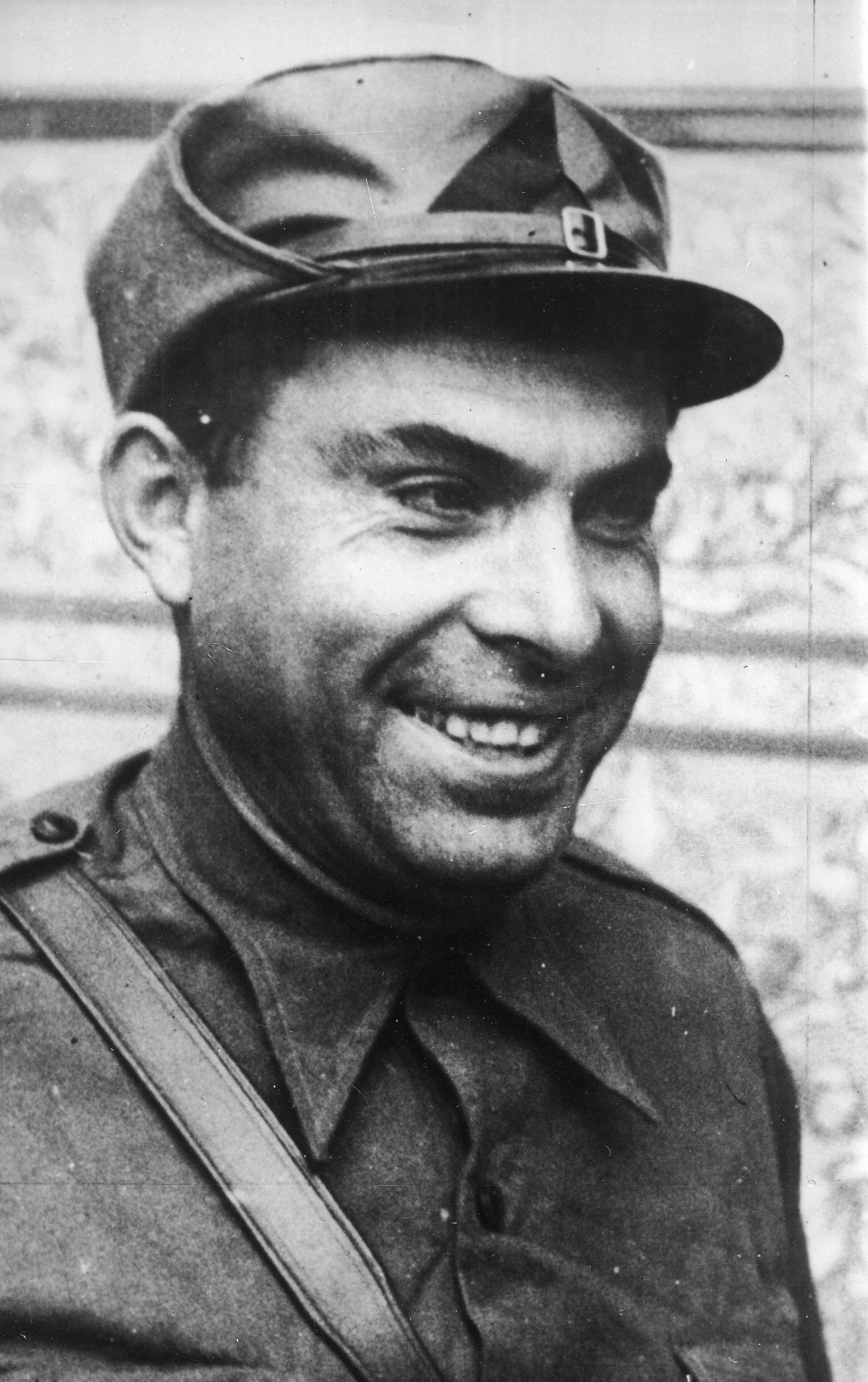
- Durruti in 1936
- Born: José Buenaventura Durruti Dumange; 14 July 1896; León, Spain
- Died: 20 November 1936 (aged 40); Madrid, Spain
- Cause of death: Killed in action
- Resting place: Montjuïc Cemetery; 41°21′14.50800″N 2°9′0.61200″E
- Occupation: Mechanic
- Organizations: General Union of Workers (1914–1917); National Confederation of Labour (1918–1936); Iberian Anarchist Federation (1927–1936)
- Other political affiliations: Los Justicieros (1920–1922); Los Solidarios (1922–1924); Los Errantes (1924–1926); Nosotros (1931–1936)
- Movement: Anarchism, anti-fascism
- Opponents: Kingdom of Spain (1920–1931); Spanish Republic (1931–1936); Nationalist Spain (1936)
- Partner: Émilienne Morin
- Children: Colette Durruti
- Parents: Santiago Durruti (father); Anastasia Dumange (mother)
- Relatives: Pedro Durruti (brother)
- Military career
- Allegiance: Republican faction
- Service: Confederal militias
- Service years: 1936
- Rank: Lieutenant colonel (posthumous)
- Commands: Durruti Column
- Conflicts: Spanish Civil War; Battle of Barcelona; Aragon front; Battle of Ciudad Universitaria †

Signature
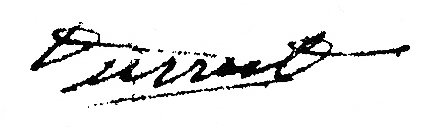

José Buenaventura Durruti Dumange (Spanish: [xoˈse βwenaβenˈtuɾa ðuˈruti ðuˈmaŋge]; 14 July 1896 – 20 November 1936) was a Spanish anarcho-syndicalist militant and a leading figure in Spanish anarchism before and during the Spanish Civil War. As a prominent member of the Confederación Nacional del Trabajo (CNT) and the Federación Anarquista Ibérica (FAI), Durruti was a key participant in the Spanish Revolution of 1936, and is remembered as a hero and martyr by the anarchist movement.

Originally a mechanic and trade unionist from León, Durruti was radicalized by state repression of the labor movement. In the 1920s, he became a leader of the anarchist affinity group Los Solidarios, which carried out bank robberies, termed "expropriations", to fund their revolutionary activities, as well as assassinations of those they held responsible for the oppression of the working class. Forced into exile, he coordinated militant activities from France and engaged in a series of expropriations across Latin America with the group Los Errantes. After returning to Spain with the proclamation of the Republic in 1931, he became one of the primary organizers of the CNT's insurrectionist wing, leading several unsuccessful uprisings for which he was repeatedly imprisoned and deported.

At the outbreak of the Civil War in July 1936, Durruti was a key figure in defeating the Nationalist military uprising in Barcelona. He subsequently organized and led the Durruti Column, one of the largest and most famous anarchist militias, which fought on the Aragon front. There, alongside combat operations, he helped implement libertarian communism in the controlled territories. In November 1936, as Nationalist forces laid siege to Madrid, he led his column to the capital to aid in its defense. On 19 November, he was mortally wounded by a gunshot while fighting in the Casa de Campo park. The circumstances of his death are disputed, with historians debating whether he was killed by enemy fire, friendly fire, or treachery.

Durruti's death was a significant blow to the anarchist movement and the Republican war effort. His funeral procession in Barcelona drew hundreds of thousands of mourners in one of the largest public demonstrations in the city's history. He became an enduring symbol of the revolutionary spirit of Spanish anarchism, praised by anarchists for his ideological conviction, leadership, and personal dedication. His legacy influenced later anarchist groups, such as the Friends of Durruti Group, and he remains one of the most iconic figures of the Spanish Civil War.

== Early life ==
=== Childhood and education ===
José Buenaventura Durruti Dumange was born on 14 July 1896, in the Santa Ana neighbourhood of León; he was the second of eight children, born to Santiago Durruti (Note: The surname Durruti came from the Lapurdian dialect of the Basque language. It was derived from the word "Urruti" (far), and used to refer to Basques who lived in the mountains far away from urban centres. Durruti's paternal grandfather, Lorenzo Durruti, had moved from the Basque Country to León with little knowledge of the Spanish language. There he married an Asturian woman, Josefa Malgo, the daughter of a court employee, who gave birth to their son Santiago.) and Anastasia Dumange. (Note: Durruti's maternal grandfather, Pedro Dumange, came from a Catalan family from the province of Girona. After moving to León, he married another Catalan, Rosa Soler, who gave birth to their daughter Anastasia in 1876. On Durruti's birth certificate, the name Dumange was Castilianised into the Spanish name Domínguez.) Durruti began his primary education at the age of five; his teacher described him as a mischievous but good-natured child. Durruti later remarked that he had been made into a rebel at an early age. At the age of six, in 1903, he witnessed the arrest of his father during a tanners' strike. Led by his uncle Ignacio, the strike lasted for nine months before it was finally defeated by the employers. Durruti's family was left destitute afterwards, as many of its members were boycotted or blacklisted for supporting the strike. Despite their limited means, Durruti's parents endeavoured to provide him and his siblings with an education. During his secondary education, although his teacher had seen intellectual potential in him, Durruti proved to be a below-average student. His grandfather Pedro had hoped he would continue his studies at the University of Valladolid, but at the age of fourteen, Durruti decided to train as a mechanic and move into the workforce.

=== Trade union activism ===
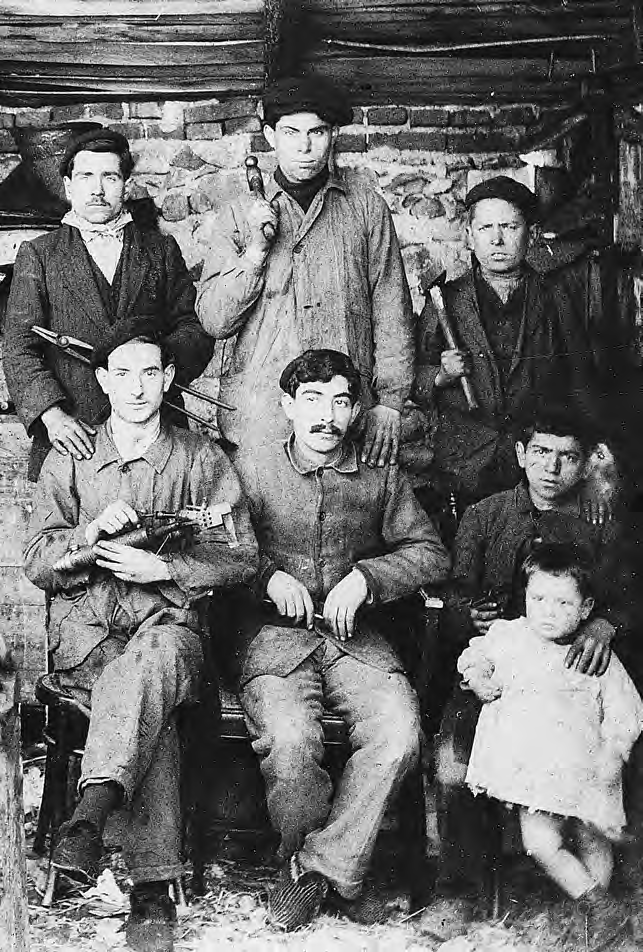
Durruti (centre-back) with his colleagues at the workshop of Antonio Mijé

In 1910, Durruti began his apprenticeship under the tutelage of Melchor Martínez, a master mechanic and a local leader of the Spanish Socialist Workers' Party (PSOE). Martínez oversaw Durruti's development as both a mechanic and as a socialist; during this period, Durruti stopped attending church and other religious events, which earned him a bad reputation among the city's Catholic population. After two years, Martínez informed Durruti that he had nothing left to teach him and pressed him to move on. He spent the subsequent year at a workshop that assembled machines for mineral processing, after which he qualified as a lathe operator. In April 1913, Durruti joined the Metalworkers' Union of the Unión General de Trabajadores (UGT) and became a prominent local union organiser. Like other workers in his union, Durruti came under the tutelage of the Leonese socialist theoretician Iglesias Munís, but before long became impatient and disillusioned with the socialist party leadership. Durruti came to reject electoral politics in favour of revolutionary socialism, which caused tension between him and the party leadership; during this time, he would often remark that "socialism is either active or isn't socialism".

Following the outbreak of World War I, Spanish neutrality enabled the country to experience an economic boom. As his workshop was unable to keep up with demand, Durruti was dispatched to Matallana, where he would oversee the installation of mineral processors on-site. A few days after arriving, the Asturian miners went on strike in protest against workplace bullying by one of the engineers, demanding he be dismissed. Durruti led his team of mechanics in a solidarity action, refusing to assemble any machinery until the miners' demands were met. This forced the management to concede to the workers demands. Impressed by his conduct, Durruti's name quickly spread among miners in Asturias, who referred to him as the "big one". After he finished his job and returned to León, he was reprimanded for joining the strike by both his boss and his union leaders; Martínez urged him to leave León or else face persecution by the Civil Guard. His father secured him a new job as a mechanic for the Northern Railway Company (CCHNE). Following a nationwide general strike by the UGT in August 1917, the CCHNE fired its entire workforce, breaking the power of the railroad workers' union. During the strike, Durruti carried out acts of sabotage, which drew the attention of the police. In an attempt to regain its position, the UGT expelled many of its more revolutionary young members, including Durruti, who was finally forced to leave León. Wanted for conscription evasion, Durruti fled to Gijón, where sympathetic Asturian miners facilitated his escape to France in December 1917.

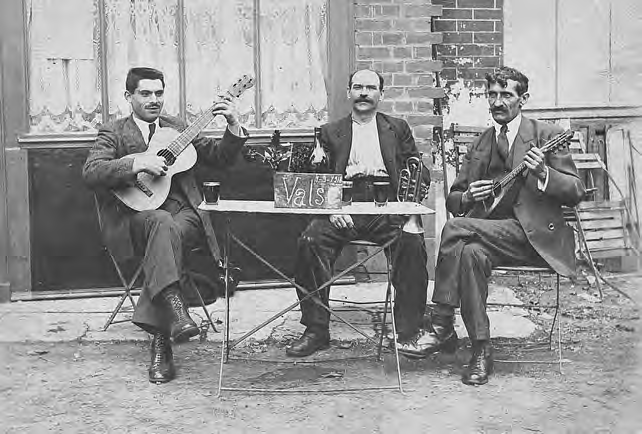
Durruti (left) during his exile in Occitania

Throughout 1918, Durruti kept moving between the cities of Occitania, while keeping in touch with family and friends in León. During this time, he came into contact with the Confederación Nacional del Trabajo (CNT), an anarcho-syndicalist trade union. Through the CNT, he adopted the political philosophy of anarchism, which he identified with his own revolutionary approach to socialism. In January 1919, he returned to Gijón and exchanged information about the CNT's activities in France with local activists that had overseen its growth in Asturias. He officially joined the CNT while working as a mechanic in La Felguera, before heading to La Robla, where Asturian mineworkers were on strike. He then attempted to meet up with some old Leonese friends in Santiago de Compostela, but was arrested by the Civil Guard, who discovered he had evaded conscription. He was brought before a Court Martial in San Sebastián, but with help from friends and his sister Rosa, he managed to escape back to France. By June 1919, he was working as a mechanic in Paris, while keeping up correspondence with Leonese anarchists. His friends kept him up to date with the development and growth of the CNT in Spain, prompting him to return to the country in early 1920. He relocated to northern Spain, where he supported strikes (including the Riotinto mining strike of 1920) with acts of sabotage and attacks against businesses.

== Militant activism ==
=== Los Justicieros ===
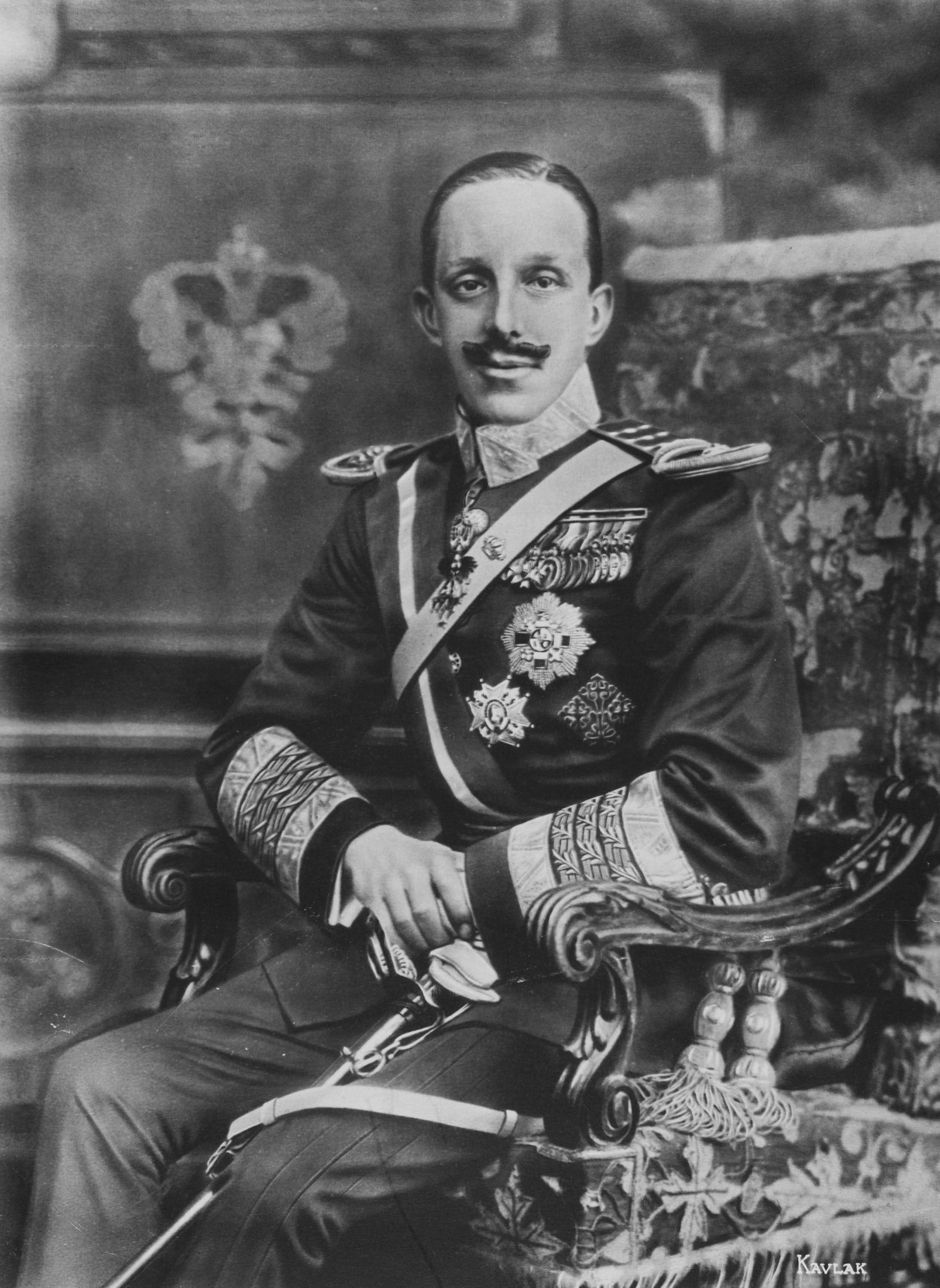
King Alfonso XIII, whom Durruti and Los Justicieros attempted to assassinate in 1920

When Durruti arrived back in San Sebastián, he found the local branch of the CNT, run by Manuel Buenacasa, which helped him find work as a mechanic in Errenteria. He frequented the union's branch office after he finished work, although he rarely took part in meetings and mostly sat by himself reading newspapers. Durruti and other metalworkers affiliated with the CNT formed an opposition group within the local branch of the UGT; Durruti's prominence within the organisation worried its socialist leadership, although he refused to accept any leadership positions that he was nominated for, as he considered rank-and-file militance more important. He also became close friends with the CNT leader Buenacasa, who introduced him to several of the union's militants. Durruti and a number of these new acquaintances formed a new anarchist group, Los Justicieros. In reaction to intensifying state terrorism against the trade union movement, the group decided to attempt to assassinate King Alfonso XIII; the group began constructing a tunnel under the location the King was expected to attend, while Durruti was set the task of acquiring explosives. However, before they could carry out their plan, it was uncovered by the police. Durruti, Marcelino del Campo and Gregorio Suberviola were publicly named by the media as the plotters. With the aid of sympathetic railway workers, Buenacasa arranged their escape from San Sebastián to Zaragoza by freight train.

Upon arriving in Zaragoza, the three went to the local self-managed social centre, where they were updated on the activities of the movement in Aragón; Durruti was immediately struck by how large and comprehensive the centre was, compared with the smaller centres he had been to in San Sebastián and Gijón. They then found refuge at the house of Inocencio Pina, who informed them of the repression against the local movement's activists and gave them a choice to remain in Zaragoza and join their struggle; Durruti, known to the group as the "young Asturian", agreed to stay. Despite the repression against the organised labour movement, Durruti was able to find work as a mechanic.

In February 1921, Durruti was delegated by a conference of Aragonese anarchist groups to travel around the country and contact other anarchist groups, with the intention of establishing an Iberian Anarchist Federation. He managed to convince several Andalusian anarchist groups to form a regional federation, but was prevented from contacting anarchist groups in Madrid after the assassination of Eduardo Dato. He then travelled to Barcelona and met Domingo Ascaso, who told him about the repressive conditions in the city, which prevented Catalan anarchist groups from participating in any wider coordination. Fearing the extension of the armed conflict with the pistoleros to Zaragoza, Durruti went to Bilbao to acquire weapons. Durruti, Gregorio Suberviola, and Rafael Torres Escartín robbed a paymaster in Eibar and used the money to acquire pistols and finance the CNT.

Back in Zaragoza, Durruti went to work as a locksmith and, other than attempting to support anarchist prisoners, lived a relatively secluded life. He spent much of his free time educating himself on anarchist philosophy in Inocencio Pina's library, where he read the works of Mikhail Bakunin and Peter Kropotkin, finding that their respective radicalism and practicality balanced each other out. When trials against the imprisoned anarchists were convened, Durruti convinced the CNT to support calls for a general strike, which brought together sufficient public support that the defendants were acquitted. Los Justicieros then began to discuss the role of the group in revolutionary politics, with Pina advocating for them to constitute a revolutionary vanguard, while Durruti argued against the proposal, which he believed would separate them from the working class. At this meeting, he met Francisco Ascaso, who agreed with his anti-bureaucratic arguments and soon became one of his closest friends. Ascaso, Durruti, and other members of the group decided to move to Barcelona to combat the rise of "yellow syndicalism".

=== Los Solidarios ===
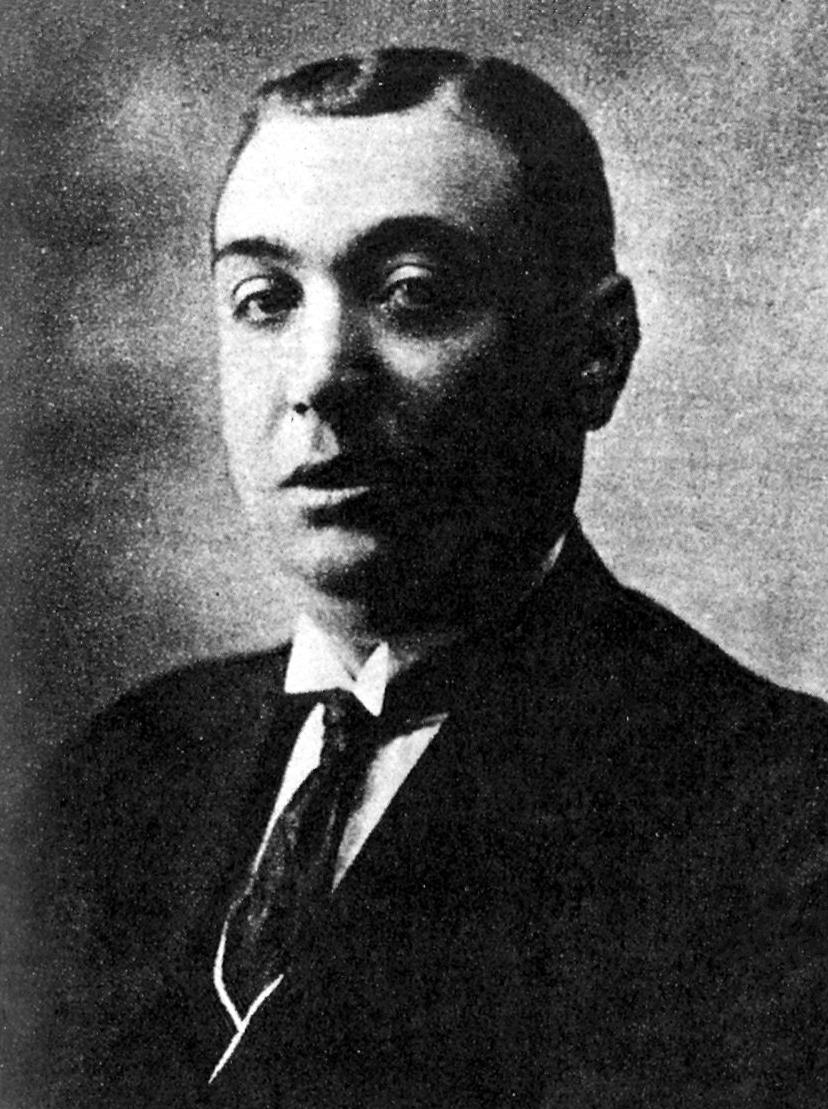
CNT leader Salvador Seguí, whose assassination triggered the outbreak of open conflict between anarchists and the pistoleros

In Barcelona, Durruti formed friendships with trade union activists of the CNT, with whom he established a new anarchist group, Los Solidarios. From this group, Durruti participated in the establishment of a Regional Commission of Anarchist Relations, which coordinated anarchist groups in Catalonia. The Commission tasked him with acquiring weapons and explosives. Durruti and the Catalan metalworker Eusebi Brau manufactured 6,000 grenades in an underground workshop and stockpiled them in depots throughout Barcelona. After the assassination of Salvador Seguí by pistoleros on 10 March 1923, the city exploded into social conflict, with open gun fights between radicalised workers, police and pistoleros.

Members of Los Solidarios began carrying out armed robberies to sustain their insurgent campaign. In April 1923, Durruti travelled to Madrid, where he gave stolen money to the defense fund of Pere Mateu and Lluís Nicolau, who had been charged with murdering Eduardo Dato. He had planned to attend a conference called by a local anarchist group, but the meeting was postponed by a week. He instead took the time to visit Manuel Buenacasa, who initially didn't recognise Durruti, remarking that he had "dressed like an Englishman" and wore thick-rimmed glasses. Durruti said that he wanted to visit imprisoned assassins; Buenacasa attempted to dissuade him, but Durruti pressed forward, believing a visit would raise their morale. He was only able to visit one prisoner, Mauro Bajatierra, whose deafness prevented them from having a conversation. After leaving the prison, he was quickly arrested by Madrid police on Calle de Alcalá. His identity was confirmed, he was charged with armed robbery, attempted regicide and desertion, and he was transferred to San Sebastián for trial. The Spanish press praised his capture, declaring him one of the leading terrorists in Spain. Defended by the Catalan lawyer Joan Rusiñol, Durruti was acquitted of the charges of armed robbery and attempted regicide, but remained in prison for desertion.

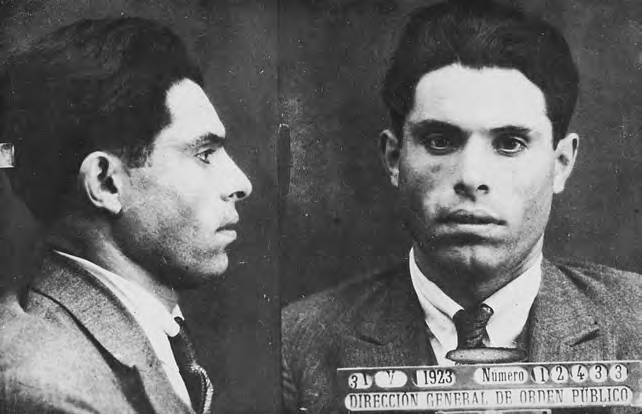
Durruti after his arrest in Madrid in 1923

His release was delayed after members of Los Solidarios assassinated Fernando González Regueral in León; the police erroneously assumed local members of the CNT and Durruti's family had been involved, so launched an investigation into the possibility of his involvement. The Spanish press also blamed the "infamous gang led by the terrorist Durruti" for the assassination of Archbishop Juan Soldevila. While police carried out arrests and raids to apprehend Soldevila's assassins, Durruti was released from prison. He had promised his mother that he would immediately visit her in León after his release, but when he heard that Ascaso and other members of Los Solidarios had been arrested, he instead went to Barcelona. There he found Los Solidarios were discussing internal conflicts between revolutionary, moderate and Bolshevik factions of the CNT, as well as the political crisis in the national government over the ongoing Rif War. One of their members, who had infiltrated the armed forces, reported that a military coup was being prepared by general Miguel Primo de Rivera.

In order to procure weapons to resist the imminent coup, Durruti and Torres Escartín set off to Asturias, where they planned to rob a branch of the Bank of Spain. They briefly stopped in Zaragoza, where they learnt of the local movement's plans to break anarchists out of prison, before heading to Bilbao, where they found a weapons supplier. By August 1923, they had arrived in Gijón and were beginning preparations for the heist. Joined by other Solidarios, on 1 September, they stole 650,000 pesetas from the bank vault and escaped into the mountains in a hijacked car. During the heist, the bank manager had attempted to disarm Durruti, slapped him and even bit his finger. After some struggle, Durruti managed to throw him off and fired his gun, with the bullet grazing the manager's neck. After escaping, the Solidarios then split up, with one group taking the money to purchase the weapons, while Durruti and Torres Escartín hid out in a mountain cabin. On 3 September, the cabin was assaulted by Civil Guards. Torres Escartín was arrested, but Durruti managed to get away. In León, the press printed fantastical stories about his escape, with one story claiming he had stripped a clergyman of his cassock at gunpoint and fled in disguise as a priest. When his mother was asked about her son, she replied: "I don't know if my son has millions. All I know is that every time he comes to León, I have to dress him from head to toe and pay for the return trip".

=== Exile in Paris ===
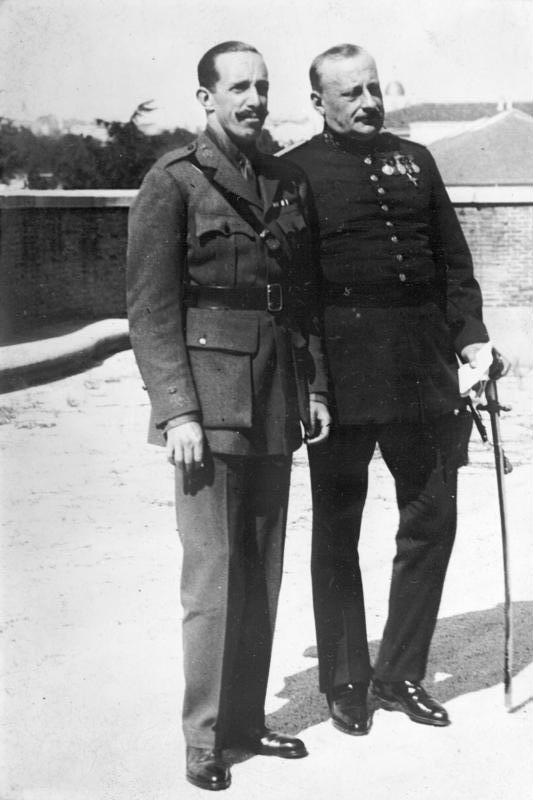
Alfonso XIII (left) and Miguel Primo de Rivera (right), the two leading figures of the dictatorship in Spain

By November 1923, Los Solidarios were facing harsh repression by the dictatorship of Primo de Rivera, which had taken a close interest in liquidating the "Durruti gang". Fearing for their lives, Durruti and Ascaso fled into exile in France. They were given the remaining money from the Gijón heist, with which they were tasked with establishing a revolutionary centre in exile and publishing propaganda. In Paris, they provided the funds for the establishment of an International Anarchist Press, which published Sébastien Faure's Anarchist Encyclopedia. Having quickly spent most of their money, they were forced to live a frugal lifestyle and soon sought out jobs, although the Spanish press alleged they had gone to the city to carry out more robberies. By January 1924, Durruti was working as a mechanic for Renault and Ascaso was manufacturing tubes at a factory. The two lived together in the neighbourhood of Bellveille, where many other exiled anarchists had established themselves. Durruti used the time there, under Faure's tutelage, to educate himself in the "art of revolution". Durruti and Ascaso constantly discussed the issue of revolution with their fellow exiles. They remained optimistic about the prospects of revolution, eschewing dogmatic debates over political theory in favour of encouraging their comrades to take direct action.

In mid-1924, Domingo Ascaso arrived in Paris and informed Durruti and Francisco of his plan to ignite an insurrection in Catalonia. Tired of constant meetings and anxious to finally take action, they jumped at the chance. By September 1924, plans for the operation were well underway, but difficulties acquiring weapons and supporters in Barcelona made many of the insurgents sceptical about their chances. Durruti gave a speech to his comrades, attempting to make points about revolutionary action, rather than to convince anybody. He admitted that the news from Barcelona was discouraging, but he still believed that a revolutionary situation existed in Catalonia, due to the repression of Catalan nationalists and intellectuals, the continuation of the Rif War and the deteriorating conditions of the working classes. He affirmed that they had the ability to spark a revolution, and that even if they failed, they would still bring Spain closer to revolution. By the time the day of action came, none of the revolutionaries who heard his speech had wavered.

In November 1924, Durruti set off to the France–Spain border. He was part of a group of revolutionaries that were to cross the Basque side of the border, between Hendaia and Bera. They managed to dispatch the first detachment of border guards they encountered and marched into the Pyrenees, where they were ambushed by another detachment of border guards. Outnumbered and exhausted, they were forced into a fighting retreat, during which two revolutionaries were killed and one gravely wounded. Two days later, others in the group were arrested and transferred to Iruña, where they were tried and executed. Defeated, Durruti returned to Paris and hid out in a suburban house provided by local anarchists. At the behest of the Spanish dictatorship, the French government moved to expel Spanish anarchists from the country. Durruti and Ascaso had themselves been sentenced in absentia to life imprisonment. But Durruti refused to leave until he heard of the situation in Barcelona. Before long, Ricardo Sanz García had arrived in Paris. He told Durruti and Ascaso about the defeat of the insurrection in Barcelona, and that the Revolutionary Committee was now in urgent need of funds. The pair decided to go to Latin America, where they could solicit support from Spanish emigrants. In December 1924, Durruti and Ascaso set off with false passports and embarked for Cuba.

=== Expropriations in Latin America ===
After arriving in Havana, Durruti and Ascaso stayed at the home of a young Cuban anarchist. They had tactical disagreements with their host, who supported educational initiatives and rejected their agitation for direct action. Undeterred, the two found jobs as dockworkers and began agitating among their co-workers, who particularly appreciated Durruti's kind and helpful nature. Using plain language to communicate his ideas, Durruti called for the workers to form a trade union, based on a horizontal structure without union representatives, which could take collective action for the improvement of their living and working conditions. By the time the dockworkers established such a union, Durruti had caught the attention of the police and had to leave Havana. They moved to Santa Clara Province, where they found jobs harvesting sugarcane and were quickly caught up in a strike action. After the violent repression of the strike, Ascaso and Durruti murdered their employer, leaving a note which attributed the attack to Los Errantes (English: The Wanderers). As police searched for them, they returned to Havana and took a small boat to Mexico.

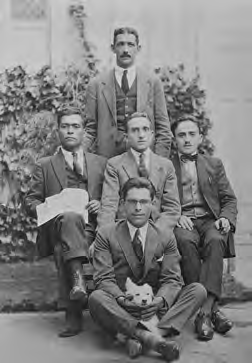
Durruti (bottom) with other members of Los Errantes in Mexico

While disembarking in Yucatán, they were caught by officers of the Mexican Treasury, but Durruti managed to bribe the agents into releasing them. They made their way to Mexico City, where they were hosted by the General Confederation of Workers (CGT) until reuniting with Alejandro Ascaso and Gregorio Jover in March 1925. They then moved to Tecomán, where they linked up with the local anarchist group. Together they robbed an office and donated the money to the CGT. Durruti continued to hand over large sums of money to the CGT, which aroused suspicion, forcing him to show a letter from Sébastian Faure confirming his own receipt of a large amount of money. As he was living under the assumed identity of a wealthy Peruvian mine-owner, Durruti treated his comrades in the CGT to expensive meals at restaurants, where he gave them money to support the establishment of schools for children. Durruti also gave lectures about Francisco Ferrer's model of progressive education in Tampico. Mexican anarcho-syndicalists remembered Durruti as one of the strongest supporters of the CGT.

In May 1925, after briefly stopping in Cuba for a quick bank robbery, the group went to Valparaíso, Chile. There, in July, they robbed a branch of the Bank of Chile. They then moved to Buenos Aires, Argentina, which they planned to make the centre of their operations. Durruti found a job as a dockworker and lived a rather unassuming life for a few months. But after a series of botched robberies by unknown Spaniards, the identities of Los Errantes were provided to the Argentine police by their counterparts in Spain. The Argentine police posted wanted posters for Durruti and his comrades throughout the city. One poster was seen by the poet Raúl González Tuñón, who was inspired by it to write a poem about Durruti's mugshot. In response to the posters, Los Errantes robbed a bank in San Martín and secured enough money to escape the country.

Police attempts to apprehend them were frustrated after ABC erroneously reported that Durruti had been arrested in the French city of Bordeaux. In February 1926, Los Errantes left South America and returned to France. By June 1926, Durruti, Ascaso and Jover were plotting to attack Alfonso XIII, on the occasion of the king's visit to Paris. But before they could carry out their attempt, a police informant they hired as driver gave them up. They were arrested on 25 June and imprisoned in La Santé Prison.

=== Extradition proceedings ===
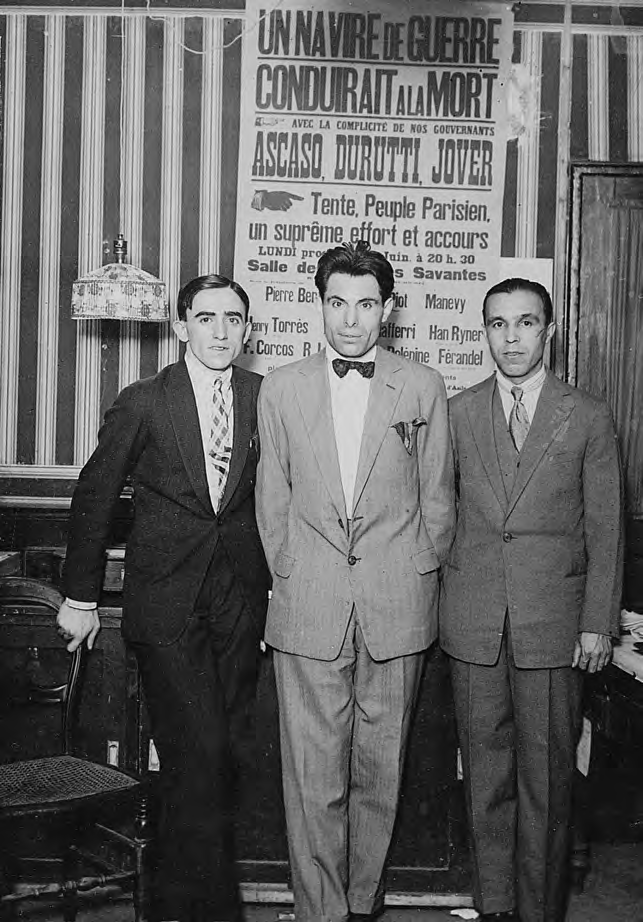
Durruti (centre), with Francisco Ascaso (left) and Gregorio Jover (right), after their release from prison in 1927

On 7 October 1926, the trial of Ascaso, Durruti and Jover began at the Palais de Justice; Durruti was charged with the use of a false passport, the criminal possession of a weapon and rebellion. As he was proficient in the French language, Durruti spoke for the group: he confessed to the charges against them, but justified their actions due to the political repression of the Primo de Rivera dictatorship. Durruti used the opportunity to transform the trial into a prosecution of the dictatorship in the court of public opinion. The three were ultimately convicted for short prison sentences, which Durruti and Jover had already served in pre-trial detention. The French government then granted an extradition request by the Argentine government, but their lawyers appealed the decision, so Durruti and Jover were pre-emptively detained at the Conciergerie.

In letters to his family, Durruti assured them that he had not been forced into penal labour, despite the claims by Leonese newspapers. He told his family to ignore anything the Spanish press wrote about him, refuting every claim the "idiotic journalists" had made about his condition, and spoke about the support he had received from sympathisers in France and Argentina. He thanked his family for sending their good wishes and reassured them that his deep libertarian convictions had helped him endure every hardship. He signed off his letter to them with a declaration that "the revolution will put an end to this social disorder".

By November 1926, as campaigns against their extradition began to gain wider public support, Ascaso, Durruti and Jover were notified that they were to be handed over to the Argentine police. Durruti and Ascaso accepted their own extradition, but appealed for the French government to grant clemency for Jover, who had two young children. On 13 February 1927, as disputes over the extradition proceedings escalated into political demonstrations and legislative reforms, Durruti, Ascaso and Jover began a hunger strike in protest against the continued threat of extradition. On 25 April, he wrote to his family that his life was now in the hands of the French Justice Minister Louis Barthou. He nevertheless remained optimistic and expressed love for his mother, asking his siblings to take care of her. By the end of May, the Argentine government had retreated from the extradition order and the deadline for the extradition expired. On 8 July, after Louis Lecoin had secured a majority in the Chamber of Deputies and threatened to bring down the government of Raymond Poincaré, Durruti, Ascaso and Jover were released. When a journalist asked Durruti what he would do next, he responded "we're going to continue the struggle with even greater intensity than before".

=== Clandestinity ===
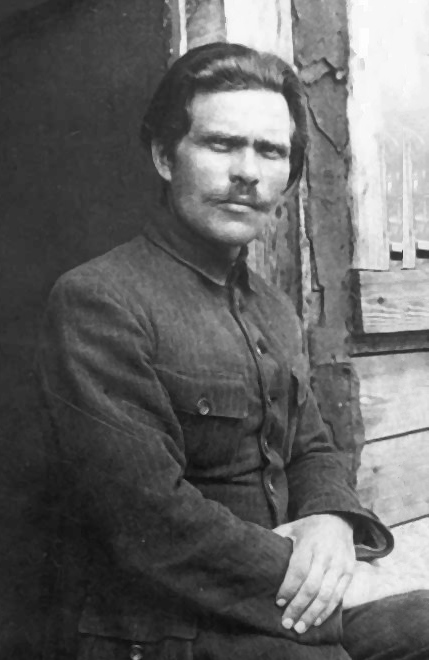
Nestor Makhno, the Ukrainian anarchist revolutionary who met with Ascaso and Durruti after their release from prison

Soon after his release, the French government ordered Durruti's expulsion from the country. While attempting to find a country that would grant him an exit visa, he frequented an anarchist bookshop in Ménilmontant, where he met and struck up a relationship with the French anarchist Émilienne Morin. He also met the Ukrainian anarchist revolutionary Nestor Makhno, who had been driven into exile by the Red Army after the defeat of his Makhnovist movement in Ukraine. Makhno agreed to meet Durruti and Ascaso, who paid homage to him and his struggle to realise anarchism in Ukraine. Makhno expressed optimism to them about the possibility of revolution in Spain, due to the organisational abilities of the Spanish anarchists, and expressed hope that he would live to participate in it.

In July 1927, the French police smuggled Durruti and Ascaso into Belgium, where they were received by the Belgian anarchist Marcel Dieu. The following month, they were taken back to the border by Belgian police and forced back into France. Facing deportation back to Spain, they were given refuge by the pacifist Émile Bouchet at his home in Joigny. After some close calls with the Gendarmerie, on the advice of fellow members of Los Solidarios, they moved to Lyon. In early November 1927, Ascaso and Durruti arrived in Lyon. With false documents, they were able to find housing and jobs, and managed to stay covert in the city, which lacked thorough policing. There they found out about the recent formation of the Iberian Anarchist Federation (FAI), which had united anarchist groups throughout Spain and Portugal. They also became involved in debates over the relationship between the CNT and the Spanish anarchist movement. Durruti and Ascaso upheld the revolutionary potential of both the proletariat and the peasantry in Spain, and believed that anarchists ought to accelerate the revolutionary process by encouraging revolutionary initiatives and staying focused on long-term goals over short-term material improvements. Their ideas were rejected by more orthodox anarchists, who accused them of "anarcho-Bolshevism".

Durruti and Ascaso also aligned themselves against proposals to establish sections of the CNT in France, as they believed it would divert attention away from revolutionary initiatives in Spain. In January 1928, Durruti and Ascaso went to Paris, where they heard news from Ricardo Sanz and Joaquín Cortés about the Spanish and Argentine anarchist movements. Together they attended a meeting of exiled Spanish anarchist groups, where they opposed a proposal by Bruno Carreras to establish CNT sections in France. Shortly after the meeting, Durruti and Ascaso were arrested by French police. They were imprisoned from April to October 1928 and, after their release, were still unable to secure visas so they could leave France. They initially attempted to secure a visa from the Soviet Union, but when its embassy required them to pledge their loyalty to the socialist state, they refused. Instead they moved to Berlin, where the German anarchists Augustin Souchy and Rudolf Rocker sheltered them. There they attended a conference of the International Workers' Association (IWA), where they clashed with Federica Montseny over questions of revolutionary leadership. Despite interventions by members of the Social Democratic Party, they were unable to secure asylum, and were expelled following objections by the Catholic Centre Party.

Durruti and Ascaso subsequently decided to return to Mexico. With help from the actor Alexander Granach, Rocker was able to raise enough funds to cover their journey. However, when Durruti and Ascaso arrived in Belgium in early 1929, they discovered the country had relaxed its immigration laws and become a safe haven for Spanish exiles. Marcel Dieu helped secure them a residence permit. They decided to send most of the money back to Rocker and remain in Brussels, where Durruti found work as a metalworker. Ida Mett recalled that his skills as a mechanic meant that he could easily find work, even during the Great Depression. Mett recalled one occasion, when Durruti tested the best out of any applicants for a job position, the manager asked him for his nationality; he responded that he was a mechanic. Durruti also established a newspaper, La Voz de Libertaria, together with Dieu, and propagandised for the FAI.

During their time in Brussels, Durruti and Ascaso were involved in numerous conspiracies. In January 1929, they collaborated in a plot by José Sánchez-Guerra to overthrow Primo de Rivera. The plot was unsuccessful, but it resulted in mobilisation of the CNT and the wider Spanish anarchist movement. In December 1929, Durruti and Ascaso were implicated in an alleged plot by Camillo Berneri to assassinate Belgian princess Marie-José and Italian prince Umberto, but the plot was eventually discovered to have been fabricated by the authorities of Fascist Italy. Berneri was deported, but Durruti and Ascaso were allowed to remain in the country. The Catalan nationalist leader Francesc Macià also attempted to solicit their support for a rebellion, but they refused. The following month, on 28 January 1930, Miguel Primo de Rivera was removed from power and his dictatorship in Spain collapsed. As the Spanish anarcho-syndicalist movement was revived, many anarchist exiles began to return to the country. Durruti and Ascaso were themselves tempted to return, but as many of the repressive structures of the dictatorship remained in place, Liberto Callejas cautioned them to wait for the right moment.

== Insurrectionary leadership in the Republic ==
=== Return to Spain ===
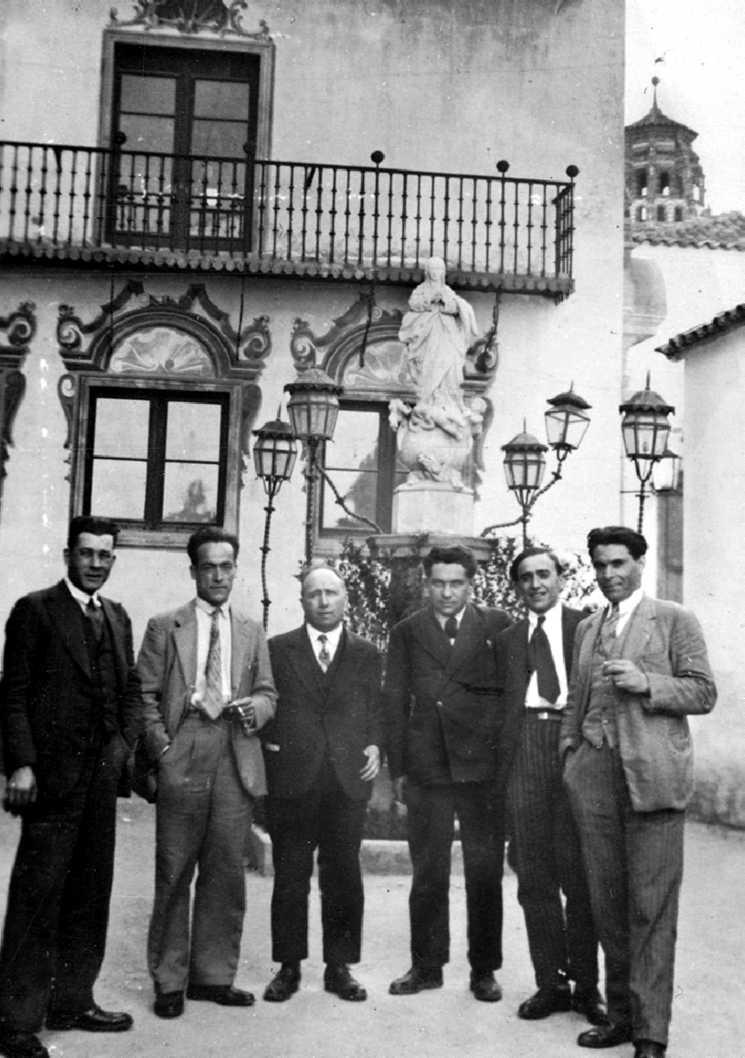
Ascaso and Durruti (far-right) at the Poble Espanyol, with other Spanish and French anarchists

When the Second Spanish Republic was proclaimed on 14 April 1931, Durruti and Ascaso were among the first anarchist exiles to return to Barcelona. The following day, Durruti and Ascaso reunited with Ricardo Sanz, who told them about the CNT's role in installing the republican government of Lluís Companys; Durruti and Ascaso regarded this to have been a mistake. They believed that the new Republican government would fail to make any radical reforms to existing socio-economic conditions, which would provoke popular discontent that anarchist revolutionaries could channel into a social revolution. For this position, they were denounced as "anarcho-Bolsheviks" by other members of the CNT and as "infantile revolutionaries" by Marxists.

Upon his arrival in Barcelona, Durruti initially stayed at Luis Riera's house in Sant Martí de Provençals. The Ascaso brothers later found him his own place in Poblenou, rented under the name of their mother Emilia Abadía. Durruti was unable to find work in the city and was kept busy by his political activism, which kept him from returning to see his family in León. As many former members of Los Solidarios remained in prison, Durruti and Ascaso had set about agitating for their immediate release. At a meeting of the CNT at Montjuïc, on 18–19 April, Durruti gave a speech about the new Republic. He declared that the regime change had marked the beginning of a process of democratisation and predicted that, if the new government disregarded the political and economic demands of the working class, it would bring the country towards civil war. Among his own demands were the release of political prisoners, the abolition of the Civil Guard and the separation of church and state. According to one listener, his style of public speaking was to improvise short sentences, which formed a close connection with his audience; after his speech, he immediately left the stage to mingle with the crowd.

In preparation for International Workers' Day, Durruti was delegated to accompany foreign anarchists that would be visiting Barcelona, including the French anarchist Louis Lecoin. When Lecoin noticed that Barcelona was covered in posters from the Communist Party of Spain (PCE), but none from the CNT and FAI, Durruti reassured him that a few sentences in Solidaridad Obrera would be enough to mobilise their members; on the day, more than 100,000 people turned up to the anarchist rally. After the demonstration arrived at the Palace of the Generalitat of Catalonia, the Civil Guard began to shoot at the demonstrators. Amid the panicked crowd, Durruti climbed on top of a truck and addressed the demonstrators; he called for calm so that nobody was trampled and cautioned armed demonstrators from returning fire. Clashes with the police only ended after the intervention of the army, which dispersed the police and the demonstrators.

When writing to his family on 6 May 1931, Durruti advised them not to come to Barcelona, as his life at the time was too busy. He welcomed them to come after his partner Emilienne Morin arrived in the city, when they would be able to get a house and spend time with them. On 11 May, he sent them another letter, informing them that Morin had arrived from Paris, that he had managed to find a job and that he was looking for a house. By June 1931, Durruti was constantly occupied with meetings, speaking at rallies and attending to other responsibilities. Between activism and his job, he was rarely able to see Morin. At the third congress of the CNT, hosted in Madrid, Durruti welcomed Rudolf Rocker, the secretary of the International Workers' Association (IWA), and discussed the political changes in Spain with him. At the welcome rally at the Palace of Communications, Rocker was overwhelmed by the more than 15,000 attendees. When he asked Durruti why none of the speakers at the rally were applauded, Durruti told him that, as anarchists wanted to prevent the formation of personality cults, they rejected applause as they believed it encouraged vanity and leaderism.

=== Political agitation and personal matters ===
By August 1931, strike actions in Barcelona had escalated into open conflict with the Catalan government and business owners, culminating in the 1931 Barcelona rent strike. Durruti took a leading role in the strike and began to reorganise his old affinity group into a new one, which they named Nosotros. During the strike, Durruti spoke before popular assemblys at the Palau de les Belles Arts and the Plaça de Catalunya. He condemned the labour minister Francisco Largo Caballero for continuing the practice of mandatory labour arbitration, which he considered to be inherently biased towards employers. He wrote again to his family that he was constantly occupied by rallies and union organising, which kept him from travelling to León to visit them. Durruti's mother then pressed his sister Rosa to travel to Barcelona and visit him. She reported that Durruti and Morin lived in squalid conditions with few possessions; Morin, who was pregnant at the time, slept on an empty bed base without a mattress. When Rosa chided her brother for not having told his family about his living situation and said they could have bought a mattress for Morin, he shrugged it off, saying Morin's pregnancy was going well. In a letter to a friend, she concluded "What could I do? My brother will always be an incurable optimist".

After the publication of the "Manifesto of the Thirty", in which moderate members of the CNT leadership called for the organisation to rein in its revolutionary initiatives, Durruti again came under attack from the right-wing press, which denounced his leadership of the FAI. Durruti never sought out journalists to publicly comment on the manifesto, as he instinctively disliked journalists, believing them to be lacking in class consciousness. It was only when Eduardo de Guzmán, editor of the independent anarchist newspaper La Tierra, approached Durruti for comment that his thoughts on the matter were publicised. Durruti rejected the manifesto's calls for peace with the Republican government; as the new government had not carried out any fundamental economic or political reforms, he considered it necessary for the Spanish working class to undertake a social revolution against the prevailing socio-economic order. In articles for Le Temps and La Nau, he wrote that he felt personally targeted by the manifesto and criticised its signatories for collaborating with politicians at a time of heightened political repression. Durruti was later expelled from the Food Workers' Union, after he accused the signatory Ricard Fornells of collaborating with political parties, without evidence.

The publication of the manifesto coincided with increased political repression against the CNT, as well as criticisms of the organisation by the PSOE and PCE. In a letter to his brother Manolín, Durruti denounced the PCE as "pawns" of the Soviet Union and advised his brother to ignore their "slander" against the CNT, which he said needed to focus its energies on clarifying its positions and combatting political repression. At the café La Tranquilidad, on the Ronda de Sant Pau, Durruti had a public debate over Bolshevism with the Soviet journalist Ilya Ehrenburg, during which Durruti criticised the Soviet Union for not providing him refuge during his period of clandestinity. There he was also informed by his sister that the Official Bulletin of Asturias (BOA) had printed an order to arrest him for the 1923 Gijón bank heist, and that police had searched her home in León, looking for him. The Spanish press branded Durruti, Ascaso and Joan Garcia Oliver as "public enemies", culminating with Ascaso's arrest in October 1931. Durruti frequently spoke at rallies protesting the arrest, during which he decried the Republic for maintaining the repressive apparatus of the dictatorship and called for social revolution against the political system. For one of these speeches, he was briefly arrested and cautioned for "insults against authority".

After receiving news of his arrest, his family urged him to quit the anarchist movement and return to León, where he could return to work as a mechanic. Durruti rebuffed their request, recalling the economic difficulties his family had faced and reaffirming his desire to continue fighting for social justice. Less than a week after he sent this letter, on 4 December 1931, Emilienne Morin gave birth to their daughter Colette Durruti. On 8 December, Durruti informed his sister Rosa that he no longer needed her money; he had charged the Northern Railroad Company an indemnity for his dismissal in August 1917, which gave him and Morin 2,600 pesetas to spend on essentials for their daughter and furniture for their house. Durruti continued to organise for the release of anarchist prisoners, causing enough of a political scandal that he predicted he would soon be imprisoned. A few days later, he went to Girona to speak at a rally and was arrested when he arrived at the railway station. Although he was charged for his attempt against Alfonso XIII in Paris, Durruti believed he had been arrested to prevent him from speaking at the rally. Under pressure from the city's workers, the civil governor quickly ordered his release and the police inspector apologised for the arrest. When he finally spoke at the rally, Durruti declared that his arrest for attempting to assassinate Alfonso XIII proved that Spain was still effectively ruled as a monarchy.

After the rally, Durruti received a letter from his sister, informing him that their father was gravely ill. Durruti, along with Morin and their daughter, finally returned to León for the first time in 14 years. His father died before he made it there; Santiago Durruti's funeral was co-organised by the UGT and CNT, who hoped to pay tribute to him and express support for his son. The local CNT branch asked him to stay so he could speak at a rally, where mine workers were protesting over poor working conditions. To prevent this, the Civil Guard arrested Durruti under investigation for the 1923 Gijón robbery. Durruti told the police chief that the money from the heist had been spent on bringing about the Republic and warned that, if he did not speak at the rally, the city would face an uprising. Durruti addressed the rally the following day, speaking before workers that had come from León, Asturias, Galicia and Castile. He declared that the Republic had failed to solve Spain's social and political issues and proclaimed that a social revolution against the existing order was inevitable; in order to bring about the revolution, he called for the working class to unite. Durruti's revolutionary optimism soon spread. Durruti and Federica Montseny began to call for the FAI to take offensive action against the Republic once the right conditions presented themselves.

=== Alt Llobregat insurrection and deportation ===
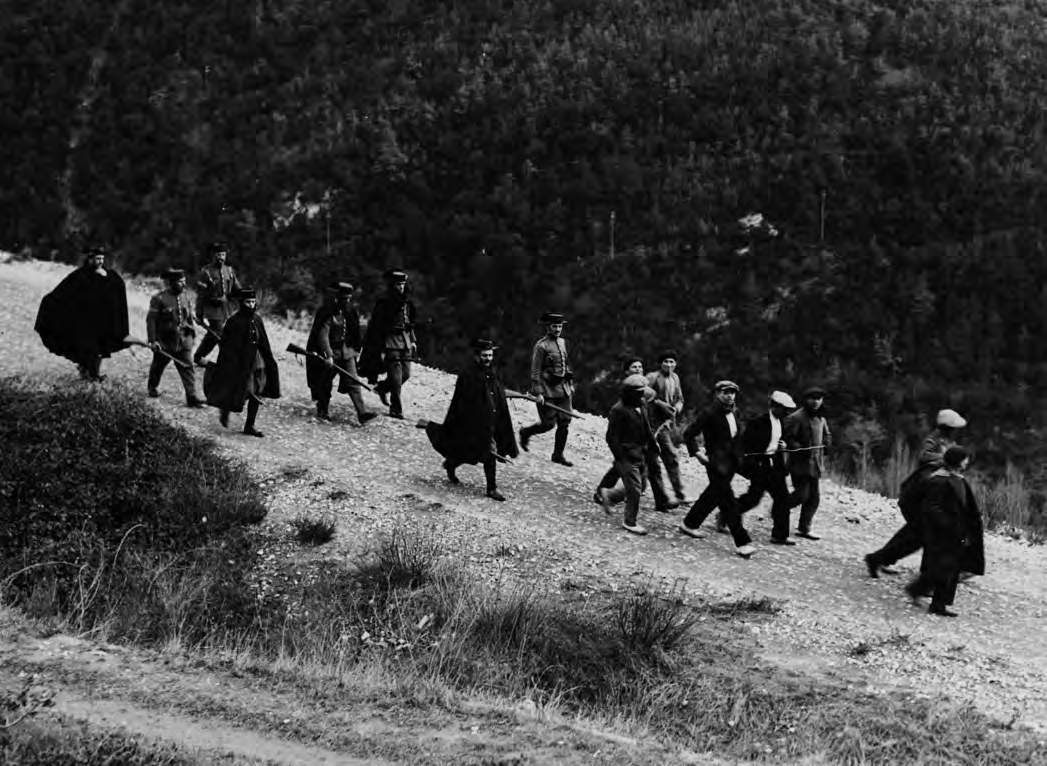
Miners under arrest, after the insurrection

In January 1932, Durruti went on a speaking tour of central Catalonia, where mine workers were being repressed by the Civil Guard. At a rally in Sallent, he called for workers to rise up in revolution, expropriate the capitalists and overthrow the state. In Fígols, he showed mine workers how to make improvised explosive devices out of dynamite and scrap metal. He proclaimed the beginning of an anarchist revolution and called for the workers to finally overthrown "bourgeois democracy". On 18 January 1932, insurrection broke out in the region, as workers armed themselves and proclaimed libertarian communism. The insurrection lasted for less than a week before it was suppressed by the army. Durruti was arrested for his part in the insurrection, on 21 January. He was among the 110 anarchist militants who were packed onto the Buenos Aires steamship, where they were sentenced without trial to deportation. They were detained for three weeks while the ship was anchored in port. When Durruti and Ascaso started a hunger strike, they were separated from the other detainees. Before his deportation, Durruti was permitted a brief visit to say goodbye to his infant daughter. On the morning of 10 February, the ship left mainland Spain in the direction of Spanish Guinea.

On the way to Africa, the deportees were crammed into the cargo hold below deck. Malnourished and held in unsanitary conditions, many of the deportees fell gravely ill. In protest against the conditions, the deportees mutinied and forced their way onto the deck, forcing the captain to provide them with access to fresh air, as well as better food and bunks. The ship then rerouted to the Canary Islands to drop off the sick, before heading to Río de Oro. However, the military governor Ramón Regueral Jove, the son of Fernando González Regueral, refused to accept the deportees if Durruti was among them. After consulting with Navy Minister José Giral, the ship returned to Fuerteventura, where it dropped off Durruti and a number of other deportees. There, Durruti was imprisoned there at Puerto de Cabras, where he contracted malaria and developed a hernia.

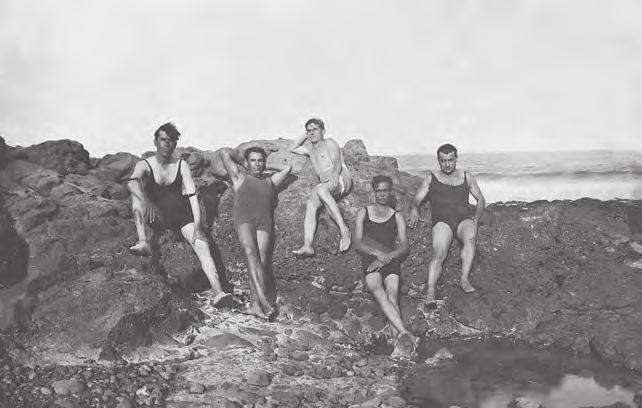
Durruti (second from left) during his exile on Fuerteventura

Upon arriving in the Canarian island in April 1932, he received letters from Morin, as well as other friends and family. In a letter to his family, he told them of the harsh conditions on the transport ship, including an armed confrontation with soldiers incited by a drunken officer, and chastised the government for subjecting him to social isolation. He reassured them that he was in good health before describing the squalid conditions on Fuerteventura, where he lived in a barracks on an allowance of 1.75 pesetas per day. He also mentioned how the islanders warmed up to his presence, having initially been under the assumption that the anarchists engaged in child cannibalism; he even met a woman from the province of León, who gave him books and offered him a place to stay at her home. He did not know how long he would be exiled or even what the reason was. He quipped about returning to León and asking the local deputies why they had supported his deportation and whether the government was "at war with geography", due to the confused journey the ship had taken. According to an acquaintance of Durruti, he lived an "orderly and contemplative life" in Fuerteventura, where he spent most of his time reading books, frequenting the breakwater. He was a cheerful man who got along well with people, men and women alike. However, he sometimes had petty disagreements with his fellow exiles, whom he perceived as somewhat lacking in knowledge.

In mainland Spain, social conflict was progressively escalating even without the presence of the "provocateur" Durruti, with strike actions, occupations and violent attacks becoming commonplace. As the government attempted to crack down on the labour movement's activities, in August 1932, right-wing forces led by General José Sanjurjo attempted a coup, but a general strike by the CNT defeated the attempt. The coup plotters were exiled to the African colonies, forcing the government to allow the deported anarchists to return. Durruti was one of the last anarchists that was permitted to leave the Canary Islands, from which he was taken directly to Barcelona by steamship. By the time Durruti arrived back in Barcelona in September 1932, Catalonia had been granted a statue of autonomy and the CNT had definitively split, with its moderate and revolutionary factions falling into open conflict. After arriving, he immediately returned to his family, finding that Morin had struggled to financially support their daughter in his absence.

=== Barcelona uprising and prison sentence ===
On 15 September, Durruti spoke before a large anarchist rally at the Palau de les Belles Arts. He praised the CNT and FAI for sticking to their revolutionary objectives and warned the government that the anarchists were ungovernable, despite any attempts to control or repress them. He rejected claims from the press that the anarchists were "thieves and criminals", countering with his belief that business owners were the real thieves, as they lived off the exploitation of labour. Turning to his deportation, he said that the government had failed in its objectives to isolate him, as it had enabled him to spread anarchist propaganda in the Canary Islands. After praising the CNT for preventing Sanjurjo's coup, he declared that if the Republican government did not resolve the problems which faced the working class, as he believed they would not, then the working class would do it themselves. He believed another revolution was inevitable. The following week, on 23 September, Durruti was arrested and held incommunicado at the Police Prefecture on Via Laietana. He was detained for two months on grounds of "governmental order", which again caused financial difficulties for his family.

After he was released in early December 1932, Durruti quickly returned to his job at the textile factory; Morin herself worried about when he would next be incarcerated. Three days after he was released, Durruti and other members of Nosotros gathered at Joan Garcia Oliver's house to discuss plans for another insurrection. At the meeting, Durruti expressed regret that the CNT had wasted time on internal debates, while the state had strengthened itself with a new, well-equipped police force, the Assault Guard. The group resolved to bring about a social revolution and established a revolutionary committee, on which Durruti served as the official representative of the CNT's National Committee. Durruti was dispatched to Cádiz, where he met with the Andalusian Regional Confederation and discussed the planned insurrection. In the Catalan capital, Durruti was assigned to oversee operations in Horta and Gràcia, where he would lead an attack against the Civil Guard barracks at the Travessera de Gràcia and Navas, and against the Carabineros barracks at Carrer de Lepant.

When the insurrection broke out on the evening of 8 January 1933, Durruti led the assault against the Travessera de Gràcia barracks, where he found that the police had already mobilised. As he distributed weapons to the insurgents in Gràcia, the young student Benjamín Cano Ruiz asked him for one so he could die for the proletariat; Durruti refused to give him a weapon, saying it was better to live than die, and told him to return to school, as he could be more helpful in the rearguard. By the early hours of 9 January, the insurrection had failed. As public criticism of the insurrection soon followed, in the newspaper La Voz Confederal, Durruti attempted to defend his actions as a necessary effort to prevent the government from consolidating power. He rejected accusations that the insurgents had attempted to take power and establish a dictatorship, denied that they were Blanquists and Trotskyists, and reaffirmed his conviction to continue. He also drew attention to the peasantry, who he considered of primary importance for revolution.

For two months after the insurrection, Durruti and Ascaso hid out in Teresa Margalef's house in Horta, where Durruti was able to frequently see his partner Morin and his daughter Colette, despite the police searching for him. In late March 1933, the CNT dispatched Durruti and Ascaso to speak at a rally in Seville. Throughout Andalusia and Extremadura, local unions planned rallies when they found out that the two would be coming. After arriving and speaking at the rally, on 8 April, as they were planning a speaking tour of the province, they were arrested on charges of "insults to authority" and "incitement to rebellion". While in pre-trial detention, they received a visit from their judge, who told them that they would be released on bail. But even after their bail was paid, the provincial governor prevented them from being released. The Madrid newspaper La Voz claimed that Durruti had been arrested because he was planning another insurrection in Andalusia. Durruti was visited in prison by the writer Pío Baroja, who portrayed him as a romantic hero and described him as an "incarnation of the Spanish guerrilla". In contrast, Interior Minister Santiago Casares Quiroga denounced Durruti as an "idler and delinquent".

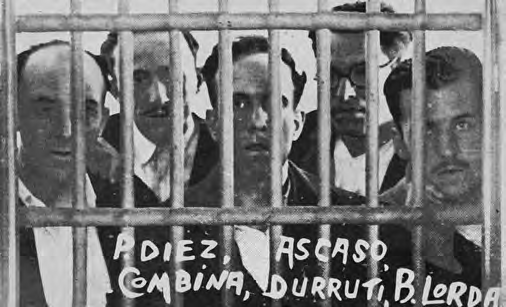
Durruti (second from right) in El Puerto de Santa María prison, with Paulino Díez (far left), Francisco Ascaso (second from left) and other anarchist prisoners

Durruti and Ascaso were incarcerated in El Puerto de Santa María prison for six months. They were held incomunicado and in unsanitary conditions, without ever being formally charged. Prison authorities censored their letters to their families, which they were only allowed to write once per week. Durruti protested, asserting that they still did not know the reason they had been incarcerated. Nevertheless, he was able to smuggle some of his letters out to the CNT and El Luchador newspapers, in which he publicised the conditions he was being held in. In June, he smuggled out a letter to Morin, in which he reported that the authorities had kept visitors from seeing him.

Following a meeting between the CNT lawyer Eduardo Barriobero and Casares Quiroga, prisoners began to receive word that the governor of Cádiz was considering their release, although Durruti was notified by the local court that his bail had been voided and that he was still charged with insults and incitement. As months went past, no prisoners were released. On 14 July 1933, Durruti sent a letter to his family, telling them of how, after the guards murdered a prisoner, he de-escalated an impending prison riot when he noticed the guards had machine guns pointed at them; he believed they intended to provoke a massacre. The prisoners subsequently announced their intention to carry out a hunger strike, in protest against their continued incarceration. In September, the government attempted to apply anti-vagrancy laws against Durruti and Ascaso, despite neither being unemployed, which provoked them to begin their hunger strike. After eight days of hunger strike, on 5 October 1933, Durruti and his fellow inmates were released. Two days later, he arrived at the CNT newspaper offices in Madrid, then the following day, he finally returned to Barcelona.

=== Zaragoza uprising and general strike ===
By the time Durruti arrived back in Barcelona, President Niceto Alcalá-Zamora had dissolved the Azaña government and called the 1933 Spanish general election, through which the right-wing was set to rise to power. Growing unemployment in Spain directly affected Durruti, who was unable to find a job at his former factory. He signed up to the job pool of the CNT Metalworkers' Union, which managed to find him and two other unemployed workers mechanical jobs at a large workshop. But when he showed up to the workshop, the management told him they only sought two workers; Durruti discovered that he had been blacklisted. In solidarity with him, his two colleagues rejected the jobs and threatened to report the incident to the CNT. Worried that it would cause a strike in the workshop, or even escalated to the entire industry, Durruti told them not to. He believed that strikes ought to be declared when workers needed them, rather than in reaction to provocations from employers. He concluded that a strike, at that time, would be detrimental to the workers' cause and told his two companions to go to work the next day. When he told Ascaso about the incident, his friend approved of his response, agreeing that the employing class was attempting to antagonise the labour movement. The two viewed right-wing newspapers, such as La Vanguardia, as part of the problem, due to their publication of sensationalist pieces about robberies by suspected anarchists. Durruti and Ascaso visited the office of La Vanguardia and gave the newspaper a statement, on behalf of the FAI, clarifying that the organisation did not approve of individual robberies and requesting the newspaper stop publishing its acronym in stories about them. Although La Vanguardia refused to publish the statement, it also stopped using the names of the CNT and FAI in its reports of such "diverse events".

In response to the apparent inevitability of a right-wing electoral victory, members of the CNT resolved to carry out another insurrection against the forthcoming government. Durruti convened a National Revolutionary Committee (NRC), which was to organise the insurrection. Durruti believed that, although the CNT did not have sufficient time or resources to establish a strong paramilitary force, they ought to carry out an insurrection anyway. He said that a revolutionary defeat would be preferable to inactivity or absence from political life during an election, and that an insurrection could send a warning to the incoming government about their revolutionary potential. He and his supporters began a campaign to agitate workers in Barcelona for another insurrection. On 12 November, Durruti spoke before a crowd of 100,000 people, at a CNT rally at La Monumental, where he declared that the FAI would be the vanguard that brought down the Republic.

On 16 November, he spoke at a FAI rally at the Palau de les Belles Arts, which attracted more than twice as many attendees than the 45,000-capacity venue could hold. Durruti opened that, although he did not possess the oratory skills of Emilio Castelar or Peter Kropotkin, his life spent among working people had made him know how to act. He believed that the Republic was destabilised enough that the political system would soon collapse and that social revolution would therefore be inevitable. He described how political leaders such as Azaña lacked sufficient popular support to hold rallies, while anarchist rallies attracted numerous and enthusiastic audiences. He also condemned moderate socialists, who he believed would never accept an alliance with the anarchists, and called for the victims of the Casas Viejas massacre to be avenged. He called for Catalan anarchists to abstain from voting in the election, as he believed no political party represented Spanish workers, and declared that anarchists would be ready to confront the actions of a reactionary government. He then rejected claims by bourgeois newspapers that the FAI had been involved in robberies, declaring that the FAI only supported the collective expropriation of property: workers seizing their means of production. He also rejected accusations of the FAI forming a dictatorship within the CNT, claiming that only popular assemblies governed the labour movement and accusing moderate syndicalists of abandoning their commitment to anarchist communism. Durruti declared that the Spanish anarchist movement was the only anarchist movement in the world that was capable of carrying out revolutionary change, that revolutionaries around the globe expected Spanish workers to lead the start of a world revolution. He thus directed workers to stay in their workplaces, where they could respond to any attempt to form a fascist dictatorship by occupying factories and seizing the means of production. Durruti invoked a sense of collective responsibility, calling for workers to unite against fascism and struggle for an anarchist revolution.

Following the right-wing victory in the election, on 23 November 1933, Durruti moved to Zaragoza and began planning the insurrection. He believed that large rates of abstention justified the rejection of the election results. When local Aragonese militants expressed doubt about their region leading the insurrection, he pointed out that political repression had left Andalusia and Catalonia unable to initiate any insurrection, while the workers' movement in Aragon was still strong; he ultimately convinced them to be the ones to lead it. The insurrection broke out on 8 December 1933. A general strike was declared in Zaragoza, where revolutionaries took over parts of the city for a number of days. After a week, the insurrection was suppressed, the government declared a state of emergency in Zaragoza and Durruti was arrested. The UGT and treintistas were quick to condemn Durruti's abortive uprising as "counterrevolutionary", as they believed it had only served to strengthen the new right-wing government and the rise of the Falange.

He was tortured by police and narrowly saved from being executed under the ley de fugas. In prison, he attempted to secure the release of as many detainees as possible. He suggested that they make the state's dossier about the insurrection disappear, which would force police to get new statements from prisoners and thus allow for the modification of numerous forced confessions. A group of young anarchists then broke into the Zaragoza Commerce Court and stole the dossier from the judges at gunpoint. With the dossier secured, Durruti and the other members of the NRC confessed to sole responsibility for the insurrection, while many prisoners that had given forced confessions were released. In February 1934, the government transferred Durruti to a prison in the province of Burgos. He was kept in solitary confinement and under constant surveillance, preventing him from communicating with other prisoners. From his cell, he was nevertheless able to publicise his thoughts on a proposed united front between the CNT and UGT. He called for the alliance to exclude political parties and constitute itself from the bottom-up, based on a federation of workers' councils, which could establish workers' control over the Spanish economy.

In April 1934, the government proclaimed a general amnesty, both for far-right figures of the 1932 coup attempt and anarchists involved in the December 1933 insurrection. Durruti was released and attempted to return to Barcelona, but he did not have money for the trip. The Asturian CNT leader Ramón Álvarez, who was also imprisoned for the insurrection, gave him what little money he had. When Durruti stopped in Zaragoza, he found the city in the middle of a general strike. The Catalan CNT had offered to provide child care for the duration of the strike, so Durruti continued on to Barcelona to prepare for the reception of the children. By the time he returned, Durruti's former ally, the Catalan president Francesc Macià, had overseen a wide-scale crackdown against the anarchist movement. His daughter Colette had also learned to walk and speak, without him being their to see it. The night he arrived, he was informed that his friend Bruno Alpini had been executed by police under the ley de fugas. The killing enraged Durruti, who privately wished death on the Catalan police chief Miquel Badia.

Durruti quickly sought to discuss the general strike in Zaragoza with the Catalan Regional Committee of the CNT, which had come under the leadership of Francisco Ascaso. Ascaso believed that the Catalan authorities intended to stop the Barcelona CNT from taking in the Aragonese children, but Durruti rejected the possibility, thinking it would cause a public outcry. Ascaso also helped him find work, putting Durruti in contact with the Food Workers' Union, which secured him a seasonal job at a beer factory. On 6 May, when people began to assemble on Carrer del Consell de Cent to collect the Aragonese children, they were attacked by the Urban Guard and Assault Guard. As he watched the violence unfold, Durruti regretted that he had dismissed Ascaso's worries about Catalan government repression. When they found out that the convoy of buses carrying the children had been diverted to Terrassa, Durruti and Ascaso took a taxi to the city. There they found the local anarchist movement had mobilised and was guarding the buses. They directed them on to Barcelona and finally united the children with their host families.

=== 1934 Revolution ===
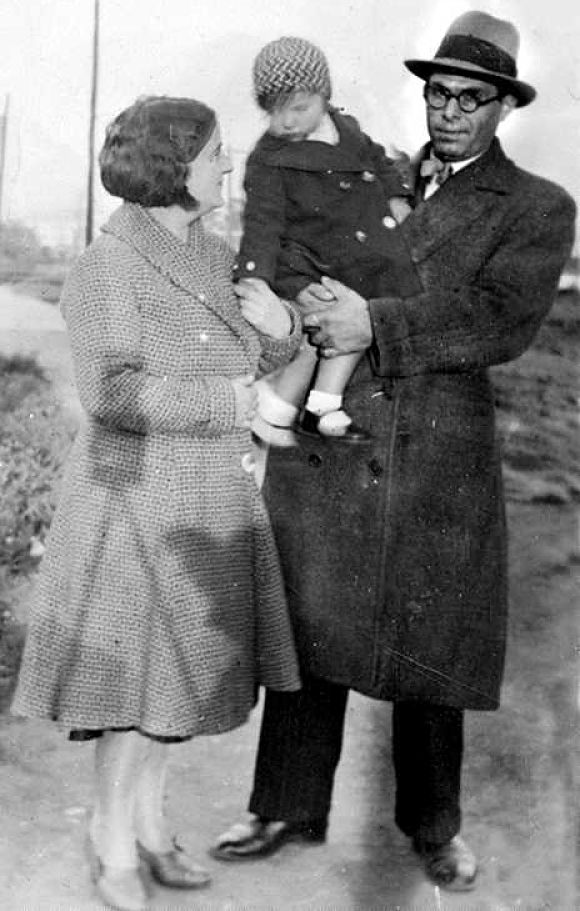
Durruti, with his partner Émilienne Morin and his daughter Colette Durruti

In May 1934, Durruti's job search was still being hindered by him being blacklisted. With him out of a job, his partner became the family's breadwinner and Durruti himself stayed at home to care for their daughter. When his anarchist comrades joked about him doing "women's work", he criticised them for misogyny. During this period of his life, Durruti sank into a depression and grew increasingly frustrated with the CNT, convinced its members were not sufficiently educating themselves and worried that its activities were turning it towards reformism. He believed that a political crisis was imminent in Spain, which could create the conditions for a revolutionary situation, and called for actions to strengthen the working class and weaken the capitalists. In late May, the CNT food workers' union found Durruti temporary employment at the S.A. Damm beer factory, but when he arrived, the company said they would not hire him. Rather than going on strike, Durruti suggested that the CNT organise a boycott against the company, which would stifle the company's profits without affecting production. The boycott resulted in a victory for the CNT, which secured a stable contract for its workers.

In June, Durruti was nominated by the Catalan regional committee to attend a national meeting of the CNT, where the issue of an alliance with the UGT was to be discussed. Durruti sought to reiterate his position on the creation of a revolutionary workers' alliance, based on workers' councils, from the bottom-up. At the meeting, Durruti argued against the Asturian committee of the CNT, which had already signed a pact with the UGT without consulting the wider organisation. The meeting ultimately resolved to schedule a national conference to make a binding decision on the proposed alliance, but before it could be held, the Revolution of 1934 broke out. On 4 October, Durruti was arrested in his home by the Catalan police, who held him incommunicado in their prefecture on Via Laietana. While he was held in preventive detention, on 6 October, the regional government proclaimed a Catalan State, although this was quickly suppressed by the Spanish Army. Martial law was imposed in Catalonia and the army took over the police prefecture. There they found Durruti, who they sentenced to 6 months in prison.

From his cell in La Model, Durruti kept up with the news of the revolution and its suppression. In discussions with other inmates, he argued that anarchists ought to be patient and rebuild their organisational strength, which he considered key to a revolutionary victory against the right-wing. He posited that liberal democracy had already been defeated by fascism in the 1933 election, and that now the choice facing the Spanish people was between fascism and social revolution. While he remained sceptical of the PSOE, he believed that a revolutionary alliance with the UGT would be necessary to resist a coming coup d'état. As increasing numbers of anarchists were imprisoned for armed robbery, Durruti also aligned himself against the practice, declaring that "it isn't time for individual expropriations, but to prepare the collective one". When Durruti was released from prison in April 1935, he discovered that he was being blamed for the rise in armed robberies by the journalist Josep Maria Planes i Martí. Enraged, he went looking for Planes and forced his way into the offices of La Publicitat, but did not find him. Jacinto Toryho recalled that Durruti was particularly upset because he had just received an eviction notice, as he had not been able to pay rent while he was in prison.

At a meeting of Barcelona's anarchist groups in May 1935, Durruti spoke on behalf of Nosotros. He denounced the recent rise in armed robberies, which he believed served only to discredit the CNT, and proposed that the FAI distance itself from individuals involved in armed robberies. A young Argentine anarchist objected, pointing out that Durruti was condemning a practice he once participated in. He admitted to this, but insisted that times had changed. He held that, as the CNT counted more than 1 million members, individual actions were no longer acceptable; conditions demanded only collective action. When discussing the political climate, he affirmed his belief that a civil war was imminent, and that anarchists ought to prepare for it by organising workers' militias under strict military discipline. He also discussed with Ascaso the new communist strategy of the popular front; the two believed that such an electoral alliance, as it was being proposed in Spain by Largo Caballero, would be used to isolate the CNT.

=== Preparations for Civil War ===
Durruti was arrested and imprisoned again in June 1935. His time in prison caused difficulties for the CNT-FAI, which was deprived of one of its most dedicated activists. In August 1935, he was transferred to La Model prison in Valencia. There he was surrounded by other anarchist inmates, who often debated the internal divisions in the CNT and FAI, particularly the recent establishment of the Syndicalist Party and the Opposition Unions by the treintistas. Durruti was disinterested in these debates, who was focused on other issues. On 11 September 1935, he wrote to José Mira, affirming his position that the CNT ought to organise towards a social revolution, rather than focusing on short-term gains and individual acts of sabotage. He commented that these acts had caused many prisoners in Valencia to lose faith in the CNT and place their hopes in an electoral victory for the left-wing. Durruti believed that such short-term struggles for better conditions were necessary, but that achieving libertarian communism ought to remain the main priority of the CNT.

Upon his release from prison in November 1935, Durruti found himself a focus of criticism by some sections of the CNT, including the Transport Workers' Union, which accused him of becoming a moderate. According to Josep Peirats, he convinced them of his arguments by beating his fists on the table as he spoke, which reified his reputation as a fighter. Some days later, he attended a rally in support of the Andalusian anarchist Jerónimo Misa, who was facing a death sentence for organising a prison break. When police attempted to arrest Ascaso for denouncing the government, Durruti helped him escape. The two were later charged for insulting the government and driven underground. Durruti subsequently travelled back to his home city of León and spoke at a local anarchist rally, where he warned the attendees to prepare for an imminent civil war. He was then arrested by the Civil Guard and transferred to Barcelona, where he was released from detention on 10 January 1936. By this time, individual attacks against business owners and the police had largely ceased, and anarchists were now discussing whether to vote in the upcoming 1936 Spanish general election. Durruti believed that a right-wing victory would result in a dictatorship, while a left-wing victory would lead to a reactionary coup d'état. In either case, Durruti believed that workers needed to prepare for open conflict with the right-wing. But unlike in 1933, in this election, Durruti refused to advise anarchists to abstain from voting, as he hoped anarchists as a voting bloc would be able to pressure the government to release their political prisoners. He said, facing the prospect of a civil war, that "the worker who votes and then quietly returns home, will be a counterrevolutionary; so will the worker who does not vote but nonetheless refuses to fight." After the Popular Front won the election, Manuel Azaña's new left-wing government extended amnesty to right-wing military leaders, while limiting it for imprisoned members of the CNT. On 6 March, Durruti denounced the government's actions at a CNT meeting. He declared that the new government had been elected by workers and could just as easily be removed by those same workers.

By the time of the 4th National Congress of the CNT, held in Zaragoza on 1 May 1936, Durruti was looked up to as an informal leader within the organisation. Due to his anti-authoritarianism, he often expressed discomfort with this leadership position, which only increased his esteem among others. Differences of opinion with another leading anarchist, Joan Garcia Oliver, caused clashes between the two. Garcia Oliver considered the CNT-FAI to be the revolutionary vanguard, while Durruti wanted a wholly anarchist revolution, driven forward by all popular forces, not just the CNT-FAI. Durruti thought Garcia Oliver's conception of revolution resembled Bolshevism and he worried that it would create a dictatorship by the CNT-FAI. At a meeting of the Textile Workers' Union, Durruti resisted Garcia Oliver's proposals to create a paramilitary, which he believed would impose itself as a new authority and crush the revolutionary aspirations of the masses. Despite Durruti's protests, the union supported Garcia Oliver's motion and called for the creation of a workers' army, based on local groups.

By July 1936, open conflict was brewing between the Spanish working-class and bourgeoisie, as both were radicalised against each other. Strike actions and factory occupations spread throughout France and Spain, leading Durruti to conclude that a Europe-wide revolution was in the near future. That month, Durruti had an operation on his hernia and was hospitalised. He checked out of the hospital on 14 July, before he had fully recovered, and met up with other members of Nosotros, who had already put contingency plans into place for the predicted outbreak of a military coup. The following day, he met with Enric Pérez Farràs, the commander of the Mossos d'Esquadra. He wanted to know what the anarchists were planning and admitted that the Catalan government would collapse, as it did in October 1934, without their help. When the police chief refused to give the anarchists weapons, Durruti concluded that the Catalan government was planning to use them as "cannon fodder". On 17 July, news began to circulate that the Spanish Army had rebelled in Morocco. CNT unions immediately responded by seizing weapons from the port of Barcelona, causing a standoff with the Assault Guards. Durruti swiftly intervened, telling the police commander Vicente Guarner to disobey his orders and allow the workers to take the weaponry. In order to save face, Guarner only confiscated rifles that were not in working order.

At 23:30 on 18 July, Durruti, Ascaso and Garcia Oliver met with the Catalan Interior Minister Josep Maria Espanya, who they attempted to convince to disarm the police and hand over their weapons to the workers. When Espanya objected to the CNT requisitioning cars and storming gunsmiths, Durruti reprimanded him, declaring that they represented "a working class that isn't going to go to battle defenselessly". They left the meeting and went to speak with the dockworkers gathered outside. Durruti told them to stay put, continue to demand weapons and surveil the barracks in the city centre. In the early hours of 19 July, Durruti, Ascaso and Garcia Oliver went all over the city, coordinating with the different unions and defense committees. During this time, Durruti was able to prevent an armed clash from breaking out between the CNT transport union and Assault Guards. They then returned to Gregorio Jover's apartment on Carrer de Pujades, where the Nosotros group had gathered. Everyone else was exhausted, but Durruti remained in high spirits, joking that there would not be any battle that day. At 04:00, they received news that the Nationalists had risen up in Barcelona.

== Military command in the Civil War ==
=== Battle of Barcelona ===
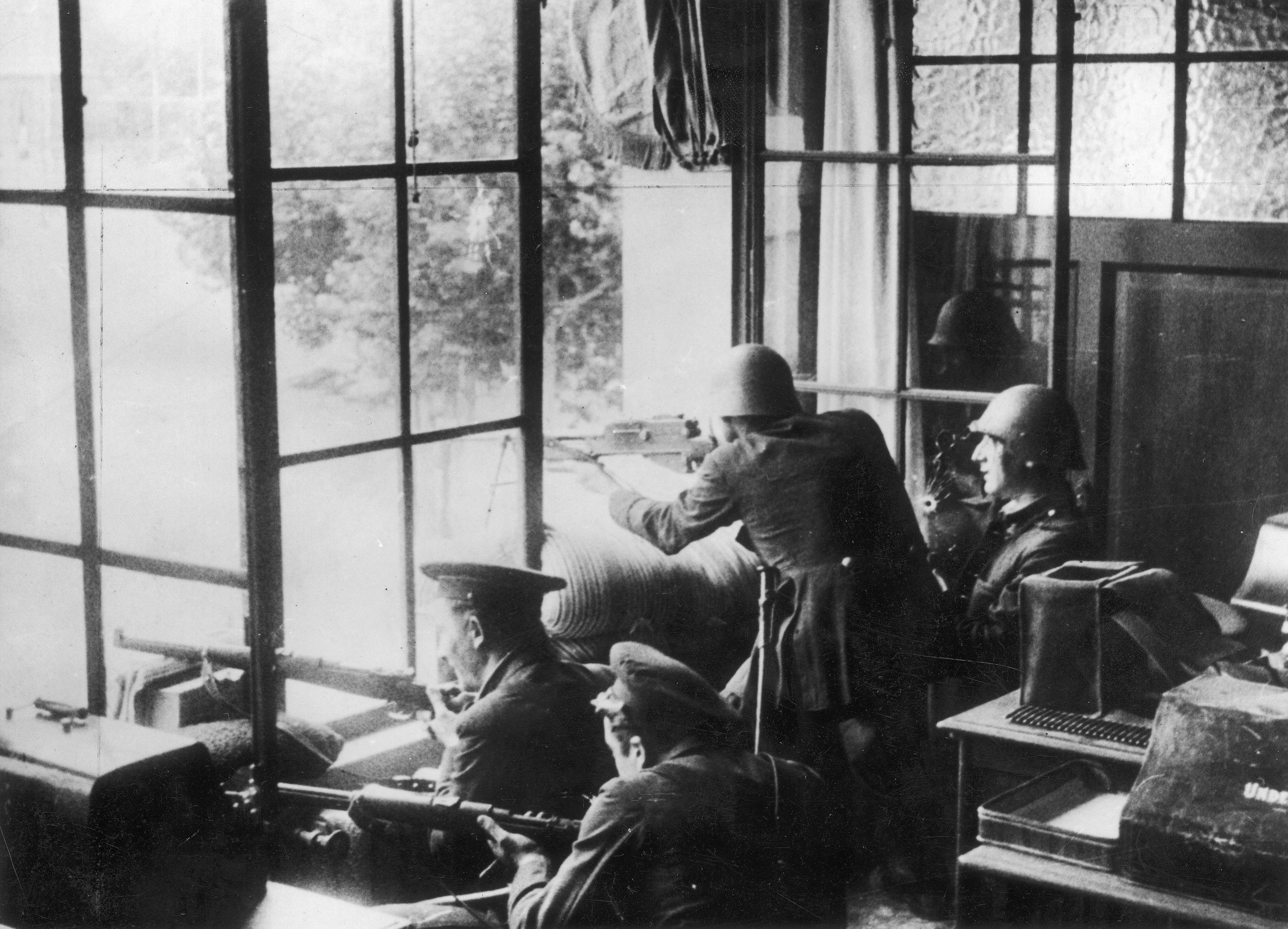
Republican troops fighting against the July 1936 military uprising in Barcelona

By 09:00 on 19 July, fighting had broken out throughout Barcelona. Durruti met with Ascaso and Garcia Oliver at the Teatre Principal, where they discussed how to gain control of the port and prevent reinforcements from being brought in by ship. When troops began shooting at them from a nearby hotel, Durruti led an attack against the hotel and cleared out the shooters. He was then directed to remain at the Teatre, where he would coordinate their forces for another assault, while Garcia Oliver and Ascaso led their own detachments elsewhere. At 10:00, Durruti arrived at the Pla de Palau, where workers' militias and Assault Guards overpowered the Spanish Army, in the first victory of the day. By 11:00, Durruti and his forces had captured La Rambla and fanned out to Via Laietana and Avinguda del Paral·lel. At 14:00, Durruti led an assault against the telephone exchange. Many anarchists died during the attack, but the forces of the CNT were victorious and the exchange was subsequently brought under workers' control. When General Manuel Goded surrendered later that day, Durruti's name was chanted by workers' militias throughout the city.

By the following day, a social revolution had swept Catalonia, confirming Durruti's prediction that workers would respond to a right-wing coup with revolution. Durruti, Ascaso and Garcia Oliver sought to finish off the right-wing mutiny with an attack against the Drassanes barracks. Durruti himself led the attack, during which he was wounded twice. Ascaso was killed during the final assault, becoming, as Durruti called him, "the first victim of the civil war" and "the first martyr of the revolution". While Durruti fought back tears for his best friend, the rebel soldiers surrendered and the anarchist militias celebrated their victory. Durruti warned one worker that they had not yet won, that the revolution would still be in progress until they defeated every remaining rebel soldier throughout Spain.

They made their way to the Casa Cambó on Via Laietana, where the CNT Regional Secretary Mariano R. Vázquez informed Durruti and Garcia Oliver that President Lluis Companys had requested a meeting with them. Durruti and Garcia Oliver went to the Palace of the Generalitat and met with the Catalan President. After meeting with Companys and the representatives of other anti-fascist parties, the anarchists moved to establish the Central Committee of Antifascist Militias of Catalonia (CCMA), which would oversee the organisation of militias to fight against the Nationalist forces. At the plenary meeting of the CNT which established the CCMA, Garcia Oliver attempted to push for the anarchists to seize power, but his motion was defeated by advocates of collaboration with other anti-fascist political groupings. Durruti deferred the anarchist seizure of power until after Zaragoza was liberated from the Nationalists.

Durruti attended the inaugural meeting of the CCMA as one of the representatives for the CNT. At the meeting, Durruti confronted the Catalan nationalist Jaume Miravitlles over an article he had written comparing the FAI to fascists. The meeting appointed Durruti as an assistant to Garcia Oliver, who himself was appointed to oversee the Department of War; Durruti was selected to head the transportation department. When the meeting concluded, Durruti and Garcia Oliver told the Stalinist politician Joan Comorera that they remembered how the Bolsheviks had repressed anarchism in Russia and that they would not allow the Spanish Communists to treat them the same way. Over the subsequent days, Durruti quickly came to regard the CCMA as a bureaucratic organisation, which he did not want to continue participating in. Seeking to continue the fight against the Nationalists, he put together the first militia column: the self-titled Durruti Column. He was then replaced on the CCMA by Marcos Alcón.

=== Departure to Aragon ===
Following Durruti's anti-authoritarian philosophy, the Durruti Column was established without a chain of command or hierarchy, with all of its units electing representatives to coordinate military actions. Durruti clashed with his military adviser, Enric Pérez Farràs, over this form of military organisation, which Pérez Farràs believed would not function in battle. He later ended up replacing Pérez Farràs with José Manzana, a non-commissioned officer who better understood Durruti's anti-authoritarian philosophy. Although Durruti believed in the necessity of military discipline and co-ordinated operational planning, he insisted that it had to be established on new foundations, rather than the ideas of traditional militarism. Durruti held that solidarity, rather than obedience to authority, would be sufficient to instil discipline and individual responsibility among the column's fighters. As his aim was victory for the social revolution, he concluded that their methods to achieve it required radical changes from existing norms. In the organisation of the column, Durruti planned to put anarchist theory into practice. At 08:00 on 24 July 1936, Durruti spoke over the radio to Barcelona's workers, asking them to supply his column with food. He hoped that the response to his call would demonstrate the city's dedication to the war effort and exemplify the workers' commitment to collective responsibility.

The Canadian journalist Pierre van Paassen reported meeting with Durruti that morning. According to van Paassen, Durruti spoke of the Nationalist victories in Aragon, Navarre and Andalusia, and predicted that the civil war would continue on for at least a month, until the Nationalists were defeated in all these areas. He then said that the workers were determined to destroy fascism, in spite of the Spanish government, which had consistently failed to suppress fascist elements in the Spanish Army, and the bourgeoisie, which opposed the social revolution. He disregarded the possibility of Soviet intervention, holding Joseph Stalin responsible for the rise of Nazism in Germany and the Japanese invasion of Manchuria, and claimed the Spanish revolutionaries were setting an example for anti-fascists in Germany and Italy. "We want the revolution here in Spain, right now," he said, "not perhaps tomorrow after the next European war". He also disregarded the possibility of French or British intervention on the side of the Republic, expecting that the libertarians would have to fight the forces of Spanish, German and Italian fascism by themselves. Van Paassen interjected, saying that the country would be ruined even if they were victorious. He reported that Durruti responded:

We have always lived in slums and holes in the wall. [...] We will have to accommodate ourselves for a time. For, you must not forget, that we can also build. It is we who built these palaces and cities, here in Spain and in America and everywhere. We, the workers. We can build others to take their place. And better ones. We are not in the least afraid of ruins. We are going to inherit the earth. There is not the slightest doubt about that. The bourgeoisie might blast and ruin its own world before it leaves the stage of history. We carry a new world here, in our hearts [...] That world is growing in this minute. (Note: Historians Manel Aisa and Danny Evans have cast doubt on the authenticity of this quote, and even whether van Paassen ever interviewed Durruti. Nevertheless, the quote has gained resonance among revolutionary anarchists as an accurate summation of Durruti's philosophy.)

At 10:00, large crowds gathered on the Passeig de Gràcia to bid farewell to the Durruti Column. While cheers broke out around him, Durruti remained mostly silent. At the Bakunin Barracks, he had warned the members of his column that the battle they were about to experience would be very different than the ones they had fought before, as it would likely involve aerial and artillery bombardments and close-quarters combat. He knew that the militiamen trusted him and would follow his lead, so he hoped to conduct himself well and preserve as many of their lives as possible.

=== On the Aragon front ===
Front lines of the Spanish Civil War at the time of Durruti's arrival on the Aragon front, in July 1936

As the Column passed through the villages of Catalonia, a number of people expressed surprise that Durruti was the leader, as he was not wearing stripes to denote his military rank. At every village they passed, Durruti stopped to speak to the residents, who he directed to organise themselves into collectives. They quickly captured Casp and Burcharaloz, the latter of which the Column established as its headquarters. They then set off towards Zaragoza. On 28 July, the Column came under heavy aerial bombardment, killing and wounding a number of militiamen. Aiming to avoid another ambush, Durruti led the Column back to Burcharaloz, where he planned to organise reconnaissance on the enemy positions. There he was reunited with his partner Émilienne Morin, with whom he organised the administrative apparatus of the Column. He also got into an argument with Pérez Farràs, who tried to use the ambush as justification for the restructuring of the Column. Durruti argued that those who had run during the bombardment would go on to fight bravely, if only they were treated as "surprised workers" rather than as deserters.

From the Burcharaloz town hall, Durruti gave a rousing speech to the Column. He chided them for running from the airplanes, pointing out that they had promised to take Zaragoza or die trying. He reminded them of the peasants who were building libertarian communism in their rear, and that their efforts would be for naught if the Nationalists were victorious. While recognising the dangers they faced, he called on them to take advantage of their victory in Barcelona to strike quickly against their enemies. He warned them against a repeat of what had happened that day, and said he did not want any cowards in his column's ranks. He welcomed anyone that did not want to continue fighting to give up their rifle to someone more willing, while encouraging those that remained to continue on to Zaragoza and Iruña. He also requested that nobody speak of what happened that day, as he believed it would reflect badly on them. None of the militiamen gave up their rifle, and those who had fled earlier broke down in tears. One eyewitness described it as a transformative experience for the militiamen, who would go on to become hardened fighters.

The Durruti Column then advanced along the Ebro river towards Zaragoza, but they were halted by Nationalist resistance some 20 kilometers outside the city, forcing them to dig in. After consulting with Colonel José Villalba Rubio, Durruti agreed to keep his Column in place until reinforcements arrived. There was little movement on the front lines in early August, which made Durruti impatient. He constantly visited advanced positions, kept track of enemy movements and stayed up to date with reports from his guerrilla detachments, which gave him useful information to reinforce their line of defense. He also devoted much of his attention to the agricultural collectives, building relations with local peasants and regularly visiting them to observe their progress. As Stalinists began to carry out attacks against the collectives, Durruti became worried that the collectives would come under threat if they did not unite together. He urged the local peasantry to establish a federation of agricultural collectives, which he said would provide them with more organisational strength and help coordinate the new libertarian socialist economy. Durruti successfully encouraged the militiamen to participate in the collectives, including in the wheat harvest, which helped to build relations between them.

As the fighting on the front lines continued, Durruti became worried that if the war kept going for much longer, it would have a damaging effect on the psyche of the revolutionaries. Thoughts to this effect prevented him from sleeping, so he would often spend his nights keeping watch at sentry positions. He also began hearing complaints from villagers about the bad behaviour of some militiamen, requiring him to reprimand them. On one occasion, he discovered five militiamen had left their sentry posts to go drink wine at a village. He expelled them from the Column and the CNT, then when they did not respond to his reprimands as he had expected, he stripped them of their clothes and sent them back to Barcelona in only their underwear. Another time, when he discovered some militiamen had attempted to desert the front, he intercepted them, lined them up against a wall at gunpoint and then forced them to give up their shoes for the militiamen who remained at the front. His temper grew shorter as time went on. Members of the collectives had been complaining to him about a lack of technical personnel and that some of their workers had left the collectives to join the Column. On the former issue, he demanded that Ricardo Sanz send them agronomists from Barcelona; of the latter, he dismissed them from the Column so that they could return to work on the collectives, telling them it was more important to the revolution. Durruti sought to the wage war against the Nationalists and advance the revolution at the tsame time.

=== Return to Barcelona ===
Even as the Durruti Column began to run low on ammunition, the front lines remained stagnant, with only low level skirmishes and unsuccessful offensives taking place. Seeking to break the stalemate, Durruti returned to Barcelona and speak with the CCMA. Along the way, he witnessed armed workers guarding every village, without any trace of police presence. At one checkpoint in Cervià de les Garrigues, he posed as a rank-and-file militiaman transferring to the rearguard and requested fuel for his vehicle. He was then directed to speak to the local revolutionary committee. In the town square, he spoke to some women leaving the church and asked them if services were still being held. They told him that the priest had quit to become a farmworker and that a consumer cooperative now occupied the building, which had been stripped of its religious iconography. In the town hall he found a member of the committee, a former schoolteacher, who told him the rest of the committee was in the fields helping with the harvest. He told Durruti that the committee members had been elected by a popular assembly, which considered each candidate's ability and conduct prior to the revolution, in a process conducted collectively without any involvement from political parties. When Durruti inquired about dispossessed former landowners, the committee member mentioned that some had joined collectives, while others had opted for individual ownership and cultivation of their own land. Satisfied with the conversation, Durruti returned to the checkpoint and said he had received the fuel for his car, before continuing on his way.

When Durruti arrived back in Barcelona, he found it was still under workers' control, with electricity, food, fuel, hospitals and public transit, as well as cinemas and theatres, and the textile and metalworking factories, all being managed collectively by the workers themselves. He also found that traditional social relations, including gender separation and the nuclear family, had all but evaporated. He visited a number of collectives, before moving on to the headquarters of the CNT-FAI. He found the building full of busy people, coming and going between its various offices. When he asked Mariano Vázquez whether the CNT was becoming a bureaucracy, the Catalan Regional Secretary explained to Durruti that they were simply implementing the decisions of the grassroots and that workers' self-management still formed the formation for all economic organisation. Durruti left the encounter optimistic that the anarchists were remaining true to their principles.

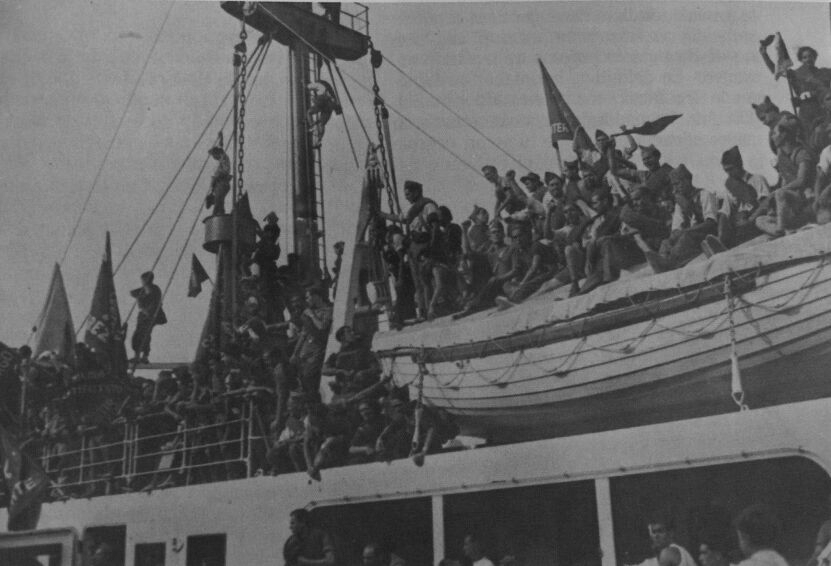
Republican troops departing for the Battle of Mallorca

He then went to the CCMA headquarters on the Pla de Palau and met with Garcia Oliver, who he found to be stressed and sleep deprived. Together they discussed the situation in Aragon, including the slated offensive to take Zaragoza, the supply shortages and the restructuring of their war committee. But then Garcia Oliver informed Durruti that the Zaragoza offensive would have to be postponed in favour of the planned Mallorca landings, which they hoped would provoke a confrontation between the British and Italians. Durruti believed that France and the United Kingdom would continue to uphold appeasement rather than confront the Italians. He argued that delaying the Zaragoza offensive further would allow the Nationalists to fortify their positions and thus prevent the militias from taking the city and linking up with Republican forces in the north, which he believed to be a necessary prerequisite to an offensive against the Nationalists in Andalusia.

Garcia Oliver responded that the decision had already been made, due to their choice to collaborate with the Republican political parties, and that he would have to remain in his position in the CCMA to give legal protection to the revolution. Durruti argued that the legalisation of their revolutionary activities would only strengthen the Catalan government and weaken the CCMA, which he believed would lead them towards a form of state socialism. Worrying that this would result in an armed conflict between the workers and the Catalan government, Durruti called a regional meeting of the CNT. At the meeting, Durruti and Garcia Oliver argued for the CNT to end its collaboration with the political parties, but the collaborationist position held firm, as CNT members worried that such a break would accelerate civil conflict within the anti-fascist ranks. Durruti left Barcelona and returned to Aragon, seeking to hold his position, strengthen the confederal militias and continue advancing the revolution.

=== Huesca offensive ===
Upon Durruti's return to the frontlines, the Aragón War Committee informed him that they were about to carry out an offensive in the province of Uesca, which required him to transfer some of his troops from the Zaragoza front. While he prepared his troops for the offensive, on 13 August, he was interviewed by the French journalist Guy de Traversay; they spoke in French, which Durruti had learned during his time imprisoned in La Santé. Durruti defended the anarchist structure of his militia column, despite De Traversary's insistence on the need for militarisation in order to increase efficiency. The following day, the Soviet journalist Mikhail Koltsov arrived in Burcharaloz to interview Durruti. When the two met, Durruti was busy issuing orders, only stopping once he noticed Koltsov had a letter from Garcia Oliver identifying him as a journalist for Pravda. He asked Koltsov what the Soviet Union planned to do to aid the Spanish revolution; the journalist responded that the Soviet government could not intervene directly, due to diplomatic issues, but that their trade unions had organised a support campaign which raised money for José Giral's government. Durruti responded that it was the Spanish working class, not the government, that was fighting against fascism in Spain; he said it did not make sense to him why Soviet workers were sending money to the government rather than the workers themselves. He then told Koltsov it was his responsibility to better inform Soviet workers of the nature of the Spanish revolution. Koltsov omitted this part of the exchange from his Spanish Diary, in order to abide by the Bolshevik party line on anarchists. When Koltsov asked him about the military situation, Durruti responded that he thought the Republicans should focus all their strength on taking Zaragoza and lamented that their forces were dispersed across other areas. He said that once their positions in Uesca and Teruel had improved, they would attack Zaragoza. Koltsov then inquired about issues with discipline and command structure, to which Durruti responded that they did not have such problems in his column, as it functioned according to mutual agreement, self-discipline and collective responsibility. Durruti also told him about the Column's lack of arms and ammunition, which had forced them to rotate fighters between the front and the agricultural collectives, with militiamen even having to conserve empty bullet casings in order to send them back to Barcelona. He also told Koltsov that the militiamen were trained how to use and maintain their weapons, how to protect themselves and best fight enemy soldiers, but that they were not taught to "toe the line", as the column functioned non-hierarchically.

Following the encounters with De Traversay and Koltsov, Durruti met with the French journalist Albert Souillon and the Argentine José Gabriel, both of whom wanted to witness the upcoming attack on Fuents d'Ebro. After the battle, Souillon interviewed Durruti for La Montagne; Durruti complained about Léon Blum's policy of non-interventionism, which he logically understood but philosophically could not abide. He requested that Souillon write that the Spanish were fighting for the French people, as much as for themselves, and that they needed planes if they were to beat the fascists. He was later interviewed by the American anarchist Emma Goldman; he told her that he was a life-long anarchist and would prefer to lead his comrades as an anarchist rather than command them like a military officer, and that he believed voluntary self-discipline and collective responsibility were the best ways to ensure group cohesion. Goldman recalled that, rather than punishing militiamen who did not cohere with their responsibilities, Durruti calmly communicated with them about why their actions were important to the revolution. The Italian anarchist newspaper Guerre di Clase reported that, on one occasion, when a militiaman of the artillery battery requested leave to go to Barcelona, Durruti put it up to a vote and the majority gave him permission. Military historian Michael Alpert considers Durruti's attitude towards voluntarism at the outset of the war to have been "short-sighted", and noted that his optimism about the prospects of untrained volunteers would later give way to a more "realistic attitude" regarding the importance of discipline and professionalism.

In early-September 1936, José Villalba launched an offensive to recapture the town of Sietemo, which caused friction with Durruti, as Villalba had refused to coordinate with other militia columns at their War Committee in Sarinyena. At a meeting of the CCMA, Durruti confronted Villalba, blaming him for the Republican loss of Sietemo the previous month. Despite their differences, Durruti agreed to aid Villalba's offensive and led his Column in the capture of Sietemo, Loporzano and the Castle of Montearagón, clearing the way to Uesca city. The CCMA then tasked Durruti with addressing Spanish workers over the radio and informing them of the Republican victory on the Uesca front. He started his speech by disregarding the distinction between workers on the frontline and in the rearguard, declaring they were all united by the same objective to build a working-class society, which he believed would be established by the CNT and UGT after the war was won. He said the workers' militias were not fighting to be rewarded with medals or official positions in the government, and that they would return to their workplaces once they were victorious. He then addressed the upcoming harvest, which he declared would be distributed equally to everyone, with no special privileges, not even for himself. He told Catalan workers that he was proud to represent them on the frontlines, but that the struggle was a collective action and that they needed to ship all the weapons they had to the front; he also asked women not to send bad news to the front lines, so that militiamen could focus on fighting. He then addressed workers in the Nationalist zone, calling on them to sabotage the Nationalists' military industry and form guerrilla cells to fight them behind their lines. He ended his speech by calling all Spanish workers to have courage, declaring: "Comrades, we should be hopeful. Our ideal accompanies us. That is our strength. Courage and forward! You don't argue with fascism, you destroy it, because fascism and capitalism are the same thing!" The speech led to a fierce debate between the Unified Socialist Party of Catalonia (PSUC) and the Barcelona revolutionary committees, as the former weighed against the revolution and called for obedience to the state, while the latter refused to give up their weapons until workers' control of the Republican zone was secured.

=== Tensions with Madrid ===
On 15 September, Durruti returned to Barcelona, where Garcia Oliver informed him of a plan to incite a rebellion by the Riffian independence movement in the Spanish protectorate in Morocco. Durruti supported the plan to involve the exiled Riffian rebel leader Abd el-Krim, despite him being incarcerated in Réunion, as he believed he would provide more effective leadership to a rebellion than the Fez-based Moroccan Action Committee (MAC). He briefly met with the originator of the plan, the French syndicalist leader Pierre Besnard, who spoke highly of Durruti. Besnard said he was the only Spanish revolutionary leader who had "escaped degradation", as he fought with the rank-and-file on the front lines, and compared him positively with Nestor Makhno. Durruti requested that Besnard contact a munitions dealer to supply his Column with weaponry, before he was himself recalled to the front lines to aid in a Republican offensive. Durruti and Besnard pressed Catalan prime minister Josep Tarradellas to buy the weapons from Besnard's contact, but he was discouraged from doing so by Garcia Oliver. Negotiations between the MAC and the Spanish Republican government ultimately broke down, following pressure from the French government, which opposed any plan for Moroccan independence. On 26 September, the CCMA was dissolved, which incentivised Durruti to continue making revolutionary advances in order to counter what he saw as a mounting counterrevolution. Two days later, Garcia Oliver informed him that Besnard had secured them with an arms dealer.

When Durruti arrived back in Barcelona on the night of 28–29 September, Garcia Oliver and Abad de Santillán requested that Durruti go with Besnard to Madrid to propose that Largo Caballero's government purchase the weapons. But Durruti was sceptical about the plan, believing that there was no point meeting with the prime minister if he was not going to align the government with the revolution. Durruti and Santillán then discussed the idea of robbing the Bank of Spain and using the money from it to either purchase weapons or machines and materials with which to build a military industry. They contacted the 3,000 militiamen of the Land and Freedom Column, stationed in Madrid, and arranged the transport of the stolen gold by train to Catalonia. Later that night, Durruti met André Malraux, who agreed to put him on a flight to Madrid, despite him lacking an official pass. But after discussing the planned robbery with the CNT National Committee, which expressed worry that it would increase animosity towards Revolutionary Catalonia, Durruti and Santillán dropped the plan. They instead went ahead with the meeting with Largo Caballero, who agreed to move forward with the weapons purchase negotiated by Besnard. On 3 October, they met in the Navy Ministry and drew up a list of items to purchase. At 03:00 on 4 October, the Soviet ambassador called Durruti and demanded they meet immediately, but Durruti declined and returned Barcelona.

Two days later, the CNT newspaper published an interview with Durruti from his time in Madrid. It introduced him as an ideologically committed revolutionary, comparing him favourably to Pancho Villa. The paper reported that Durruti's visit to Madrid had achieved all its goals, but kept the details vague. Durruti began the interview by addressing the ongoing Madrid offensive, saying it did not make strategic sense to him why the Nationalists were focusing so much effort on the capital. He stated with certainty that all of Aragon, including Uesca, Teruel and Zaragoza, would soon come under Republican control and that this would represent the beginning of the end for the Nationalists. He then said they would fight through the north towards Asturias, which he believed they would capture in only a few days, before going on to take Galicia and Castile. He thought it likely that the Nationalists would transfer their troops from other fronts to Madrid, which he said would be defeated by the combined effort of the Republican resistance in Madrid and Republican offensives in the rest of the country. He then discussed the use of defensive fortifications in Aragon, which he characterised as the application of self-preservation to combat scenarios, noting that they allowed militiamen to survive attacks without retreating; he advised that people in Madrid construct similar fortifications to defend themselves against the Nationalist advance. He said that, as revolutionaries, the anarchist militiamen understood what they were fighting for and pushed for revolutionary change in every frontline town they captured, which gained them grassroots support from local inhabitants. He then went on to discuss his understanding of discipline, which he conceived of as a form of collective responsibility. He believed it was this sense of responsibility that compelled militiamen to obey orders and remain at the front, although they were able to remove their commanders and leave the frontlines if they chose to. He concluded the interview by declaring his satisfaction with the militiamen he was leading, although he admitted that they did not know he was in Madrid.

=== Reorganisation of the war effort ===
On 5 October 1936, Durruti returned to Burcharaloz, where the following day he participated in the creation of the Regional Defense Council of Aragon. Representing his column at the founding assembly of the Defense Council, Durruti expressed support for its establishment. He considered it a necessity to establish such a body as part of a move towards a single command structure, through which they could coordinate their military efforts on the front line. He believed that establishing it, without permission from the government in Madrid, would put pressure on other regions to come together and establish a National Defense Council to coordinate the Republican war effort. According to German historian Walther L. Bernecker, Durruti was the driving force behind the organisation of the Council of Aragon.

On 8 October, while the Durruti Column was under attack by Nationalist forces, Durruti was called to a meeting in Sarinyena to discuss the formation of a general staff. At the meeting, Durruti emphasised the deteriorating situation at Balbastro, where internal conflicts in the Republican ranks were pervasive and large numbers of Nationalists were preparing an offensive. Citing the recent Republican retreats from Farlet and Monegriello, he called for the Republican forces to clarify their internal problems and restore confidence on their front lines. The PSUC column leader José del Barrio interjected, telling the meeting of an order he had recently given to arrest local village councillors, which the Carabineros had refused to carry out. Durruti responded by saying that soldiers were there to act as advisors, not to follow political edicts. Del Barrio said that the soldiers were loved by the local people, to which Durruti responded that they were loved because they were fighting, but that them following political edicts raised suspicions. Del Barrio ultimately opposed the creation of a unified command, which Durruti denounced as "inadmissible".

Following a week of heavy fighting in the area of Perdiguera, Durruti returned to his headquarters in Monegros. There Pierre Besnard informed him that Largo Caballero had broken their agreement over the weapons purchase; the prime minister had instead handed Spain's gold over to the Soviet Union. Durruti regretted that he had trusted Largo Caballero and not gone ahead with his planned bank robbery. He also learned that the government had decreed the militarisation of the militia columns and the reestablishment of a traditional military hierarchy. Many of Durruti's fighters were now asking him for leave, so as not to submit to the government's decrees. In an interview with L'Espagne Nouvelle, Durruti feigned ignorance of the decree. He said that they would be mobilising conscripts, instituting a single command and military discipline, but that they would not be accepting any hierarchical organisation or military justice. He said that in order to prevent militarism from endangering the revolution, they would have to win the war as soon as possible. As the reorganisation took place, Durruti was visited in Burcharaloz by envoys of the Catalan CNT, who requested he go to Moscow to join an anniversary celebration of the October Revolution. Durruti thought it would be a mistake to send any representatives of the CNT to Moscow, as he believed they would be used for Soviet propaganda and not be able to communicate with Russians about their revolution, but he left the decision up to the Column's War Committee. When the Column elected to send Francisco Carreño to Moscow, on 23 October, Durruti drafted a letter to Russian workers, appealing for them to support the Spanish Revolution.

In late October, Durruti received a visit from Horacio Prieto, the General Secretary of the CNT, who at that time was negotiating with Largo Caballero to bring the CNT into the Republican government. He requested that Durruti transfer his Column from the Aragon front to help defend Madrid, but Durruti refused, not wanting to leave Aragon while the Defence Council was still unrecognised by the government or the CNT. When Prieto told him of the need for "responsibility" and "discipline", Durruti responded that he only recognised militant responsibility and revolutionary discipline, not the bureaucracy of the rearguard. Having failed to bring Durruti in line, Prieto returned from Aragon to Madrid and hastily finalised his deal with Largo Caballero for the integration of the CNT into the government.

=== Transfer to Madrid ===
As the Nationalists closed in around the Spanish capital in early November, the Catalan ministry of defence called a crisis meeting of all the militia column leaders in Aragon. While they decided on which of their forces to send to defend Madrid, Durruti was chosen to give a speech over the radio to raise the morale of the Catalan people. After the meeting, he met with the revolutionary anarchist Marcos Alcón, to whom Durruti expressed his intent to challenge the rise of bureaucracy within the CNT-FAI during his radio speech. In the speech, he called for an end to political infighting within the Republican faction, declaring that no single party could beat the fascists by themselves. He also called for workers in the rearguard to mobilise the Catalan economy in aid of the war effort and replicate the discipline shown by the militiamen on the front lines. He ended the speech with the anti-fascist slogan: "They shall not pass!" (Spanish: ¡No pasarán!). According to Alcón, the version of his speech that was printed in the anarchist press was censored. Not long after Durruti's speech, the Republican government fled Madrid, while popular militias manned the barricades to fight the Nationalist advance. Durruti's popularity among the rank-and-file surged, as he called for both the Nationalists and those Republicans who undermined the revolution to be crushed.

On 9 November, Durruti received a visit from David Antona of the Madrid CNT and Federica Montseny of the Republican government, who both requested that Durruti transfer himself to Madrid. Two days later, Durruti attended a meeting of Column representatives in Barcelona, where it was decided that he would lead his militia column to the Spanish capital. Durruti objected, as he wanted his forces to focus on capturing Zaragoza, and recommended Miguel Yoldi go to Madrid in his place; but Durruti himself was needed to raise morale, so he ultimately accepted the task. On 12 November, he called his headquarters and outlined which units would be transferred to Madrid with him. The next day, Durruti oversaw the unloading of weapons and ammunition from Mexico and loaded them onto trains bound for Madrid; he later discovered that the rifles were old and of poor quality.

While his Column took the train, Durruti flew ahead to Valencia. There he met the militiamen on the morning of 14 November, and informed them they would need to transfer onto trucks and buses for the remainder of their journey. Durruti then flew on to the capital, where he was reunited with Mikhail Koltsov. The Soviet journalist reported Durruti greeting him warmly, joking that he had neither captured Zaragoza, been killed or converted to Marxism; Koltsov described Durruti as more disciplined than when they first met, with the affect of a leader. Koltsov also reported that Durruti was given a Soviet military advisor, Hadji-Umar Mamsurov (alias "Santi"), who promised to teach him how to fire a machine gun. (Note: Durruti's biographer Abel Paz disputes whether Mamsurov was ever an adviser to Durruti, and attributes their association in the historical record wholely to Koltsov.) Durruti then met the Madrid front's commander-in-chief José Miaja and his chief of staff Vicente Rojo; Durruti told them that he would help save Madrid, but that afterwards, he would immediately return to Aragon. While waiting for his own Column to arrive, he was given command over the López Tienda Column. However, the López Tienda Column's commanding officers refused to subordinate themselves to an anarchist militiaman, and continued to operate independently. On the morning of 15 November, during offensive operations along the Manzanares, the inexperienced López-Tienda Column withdrew in a disorderly fashion, which allowed the Nationalists to break through their lines, enter the University City and occupy the Hospital Clínico San Carlos.

=== Battle of Ciudad Universitaria ===
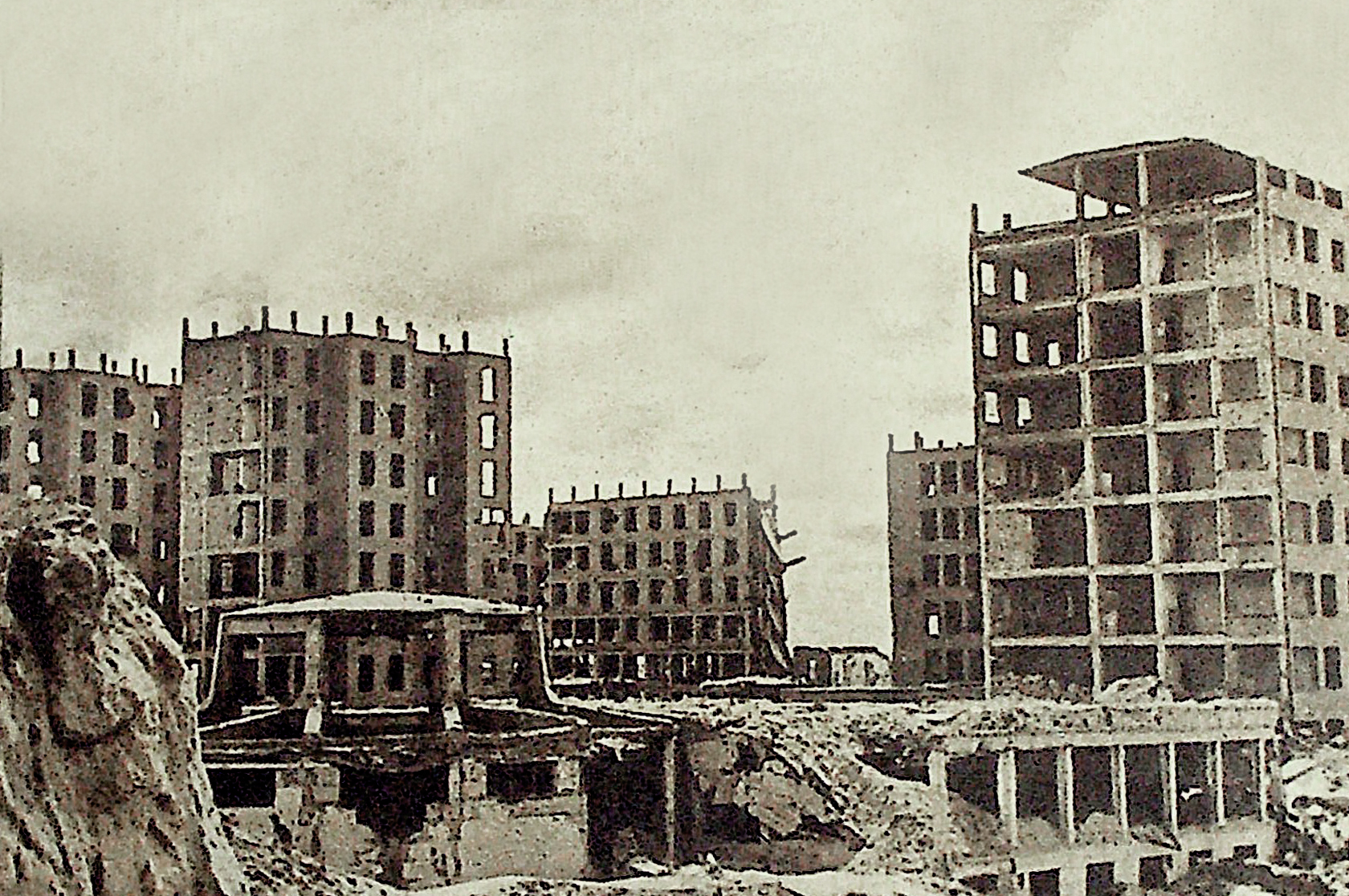
The ruins of the Hospital Clinic, after the civil war

When his Column arrived in Madrid in the afternoon of 15 November, Durruti met them on Calle de Hortaleza and assigned them to their new positions at the Cárcel Modelo, where they were to arrive at 02:00 on 16 November. While Miaja and Rojo prepared a counter-attack, Durruti met with the CNT's Madrid defense committee. Cipriano Mera was under the impression that Durruti had brought 16,000 militiamen, but he responded that it was actually less than 5,000. Durruti proposed that the two merge their columns together, but Mera believed it impossible, as his Rosal Column was needed in other positions. Durruti resolved to work with his own Column and follow his order to counterattack in the morning, despite the exhaustion of his men. Mera attempted to dissuade Durruti from carrying out a frontal assault against the Casa del Campo, but Durruti believed they had no other option and moved his forces in the direction of the Casa de Velázquez. At the Cárcel Modelo, Durruti showed his Column a map of the University City and pointed out the positions they had been ordered to capture in the coming battle. Durruti established his command post in the university's Faculty of Sciences. Over the course of the following 36 hours, the Durruti Column captured the Santa Cristina Asylum, the Casa de Velázquez and the Faculty of Philology.

On the night of 17 November, Durruti called a meeting of the Column's representatives at their headquarters on Calle de Miguel Ángel. There he was informed that more than half the men who had gone into battle had died, and the rest had not eaten or rested since the battle started. He spent the night visiting the men at their positions, amidst constant bayonet charges from the Nationalists. Durruti left the front the following morning and set off to secure relief for his exhausted troops. Upon his return to his headquarters, he spoke to a correspondent for Solidaridad Obrera; he expressed his belief that they would win the battle, but admitted that they had suffered heavy losses and they needed to replace their wounded and exhausted fighters. He then spoke to Eduardo Val, the head of the CNT's Madrid Defense Committee, who called up reinforcements from the ranks of the CNT to provide relief for Durruti's troops, but he was unable to replace all of his men. This left Durruti in a dilemma of whether to keep his exhausted men in battle, despite the dangers of doing so, or withdraw them without replacements, which would demoralise other fighters. As Durruti prepared to go to the War Ministry, Liberto Roig informed him that José Mira had been wounded and that his men were insisting on relief. Durruti told him frankly that, under the circumstances, there was no likelihood of relief and they would have to continue enduring the battle, even if they were wounded. He also promised that he would replace Mira at his post later that night. Durruti then received a call from Morin, but he was in a rush, so he quickly cut off the call after telling her she would see him again soon.

Durruti informed Miaja and Rojo about his column's situation and requested relief. They promised him that they would try to replace his men on 19 November, but they would need to hold on until then. On his way out, he briefly spoke with Koltsov and told him he had to attend to his fighters; the Soviet journalist reported that he seemed upset. He went back to University City and checked his Column's positions, then returned to his headquarters at 20:00. He met with Eduardo Val to discuss the militarisation of the militias and the Soviet intervention, setting a follow-up meeting with for the following day. He then met with Cipriano Mera, who proposed that all the confederal militias in Madrid be unified under Durruti's single command; although he hoped the rank-and-file would retain democratic control over the command structure rather than emulating the hierarchical structure of a state military, in practice, they would act as a de facto army. Durruti's own experiences in the battle had made him take a more pragmatic approach to militarisation, believing it necessary to field an army with military discipline and a single command structure. Mera and Durruti then agreed to meet the following morning, at the Directorate-General of the Civil Guard, from which Durruti would lead an offensive to capture the Hospital Clinic. Mera's unit and some reinforcements from Barcelona were placed under Durruti's command for the offensive.

At 06:00, on 19 November, Durruti met Mera at the Directorate-General and together they went up the building's tower to observe the offensive. By 07:00, they had seen their forces had taken some of the floors in the Hospital Clinic. Durruti ordered the Column to occupy the ground floor and the basement before clearing out the building, but his message arrived too late, and his forces were trapped in the upper floors by Nationalist forces on the ground floor. To free the trapped militiamen, he ordered two companies from a reserve battalion to attack the Clinic's ground floor. After a bullet almost hit Durruti, he and Mera decided to leave the tower and go back down to the street. There he agreed to Mera's proposal that they join their forces under his command and enforce strict discipline, but he remained immediately preoccupied with relieving his men as soon as possible, and told Mera they would revisit the issue in their meeting with Val later that day. At 12:30, Durruti returned to his headquarters to hear an update from Mora, who passed on a message from Mira begging for relief. He responded to Mira that he had to stay in his post until their men were replaced later that day, and prepared a relief order to be approved by Miaja.

=== Death and funeral ===
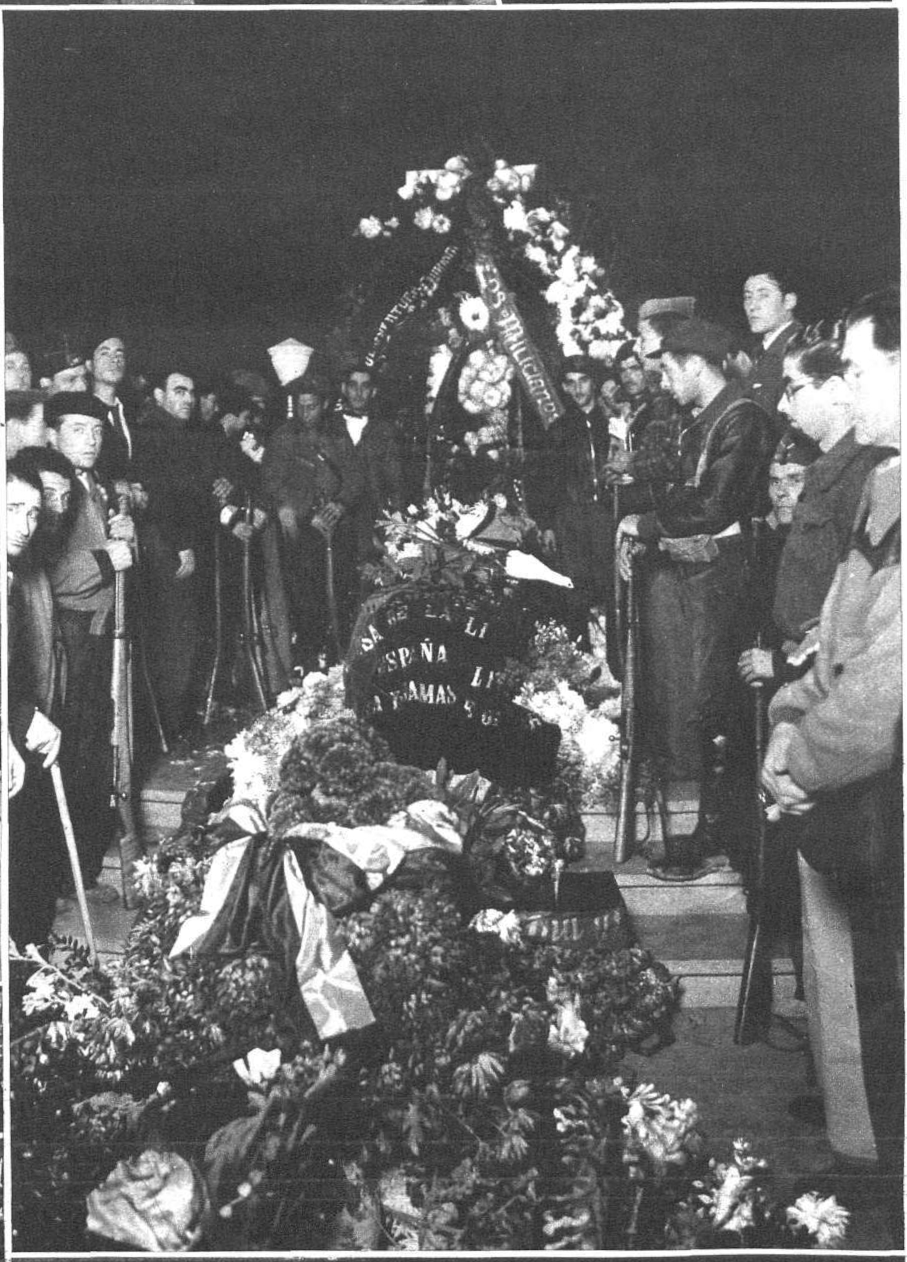
Durruti's funeral in Via Laietana, Barcelona

As Durruti prepared to go meet with the CNT Defense Committee, Antonio Bonilla arrived to inform him of problems they were facing at the Hospital Clinic. Durruti decided to see the situation in person and headed for the front in his Packard. Upon arrival, he got out of his car to speak to some militiamen. There, at 14:30, he was shot. It is unclear who was responsible, with various hypotheses blaming either the Nationalists, Stalinists or Durruti's own militiamen for the shooting. His driver rushed to get him back in the car and take him to the column's military hospital at the Ritz Hotel. Doctor Manuel Bastos Ansart diagnosed his wounds as terminal and decided not to operate. Durruti died in his hospital bed at 04:00 on 20 November 1936. His body was taken to Barcelona the following day, and his funeral was held on 23 November. His funeral was attended by an estimated 500,000 people, and the procession was headed by Lluís Companys, Joan Garcia Oliver and the consuls from Mexico and the Soviet Union.

== Legacy ==
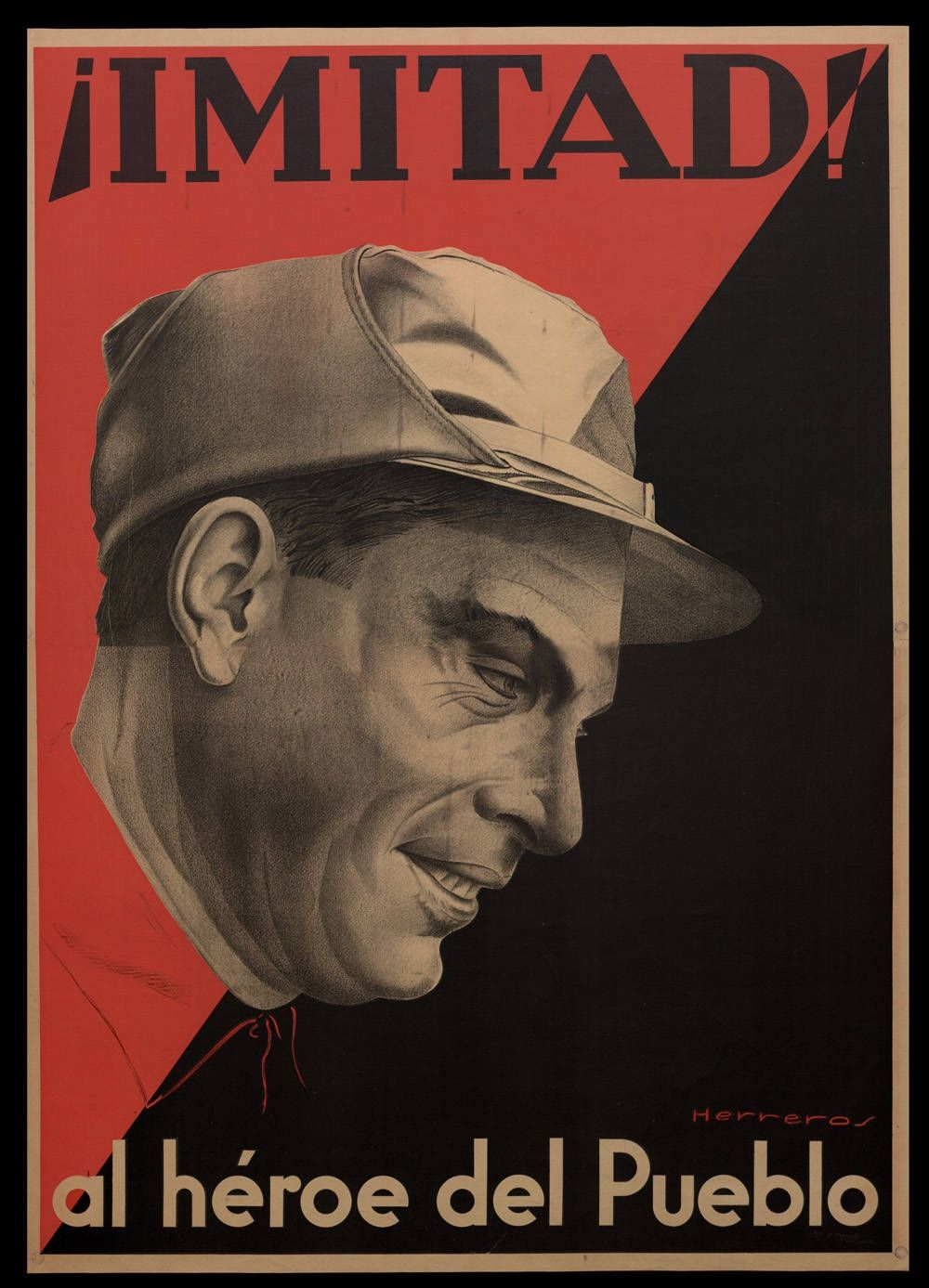
A 1937 propaganda poster by Tomás Herreros Miguel proclaiming "¡Imitad! al heróe del Pueblo" ("Imitate the people's hero!")

According to historian George Esenwein, while Durruti was already "enormously popular" as a militia leader, he achieved a "near-legendary status" after his death. Historian Helen Graham described his death as "the death of a living symbol" and the simultaneous "birth of an anarchist icon". Durruti was remembered as a criminal by the Spanish upper classes and right-wing, and as a martyr by his fellow revolutionaries. He became a central figure in the history of early 20th century Spain, and in histories of the Spanish anarchist movement in particular, as his life was considered to be representative of many other Spanish anarchists. Despite having insisted on there being no military ranks in his column other than "militiaman", Durruti was posthumously promoted to a senior officer rank. In April 1938, prime minister Juan Negrín retroactively promoted Durruti to the rank of major, effective from 19 July 1936; he also posthumously awarded him with the rank of lieutenant colonel of the Spanish Republican Army, effective from the date of his death on 20 November 1936.

At Durruti's funeral, Catalan president Lluís Companys proclaimed that Durruti's life should be an example to every anti-fascist. The poet León Felipe declared that Durruti's life would inspire a "legion of Durrutis" to follow in his footsteps, although historian Hugh Thomas said that Felipe was wrong to believe this. Emma Goldman wrote of Durruti that "there are no other people so worthy of living and dying with". She described him as the "very soul of the Spanish revolution" and depicted him as a personification of Spain itself. On the other hand, Federica Montseny insisted that Spanish anarchists "did not see him as a hero [or] a messiah", as they rejected leader cults. In contrast, Nazi propagandist Karl-Georg von Stackelberg denounced Durruti as "subhuman".

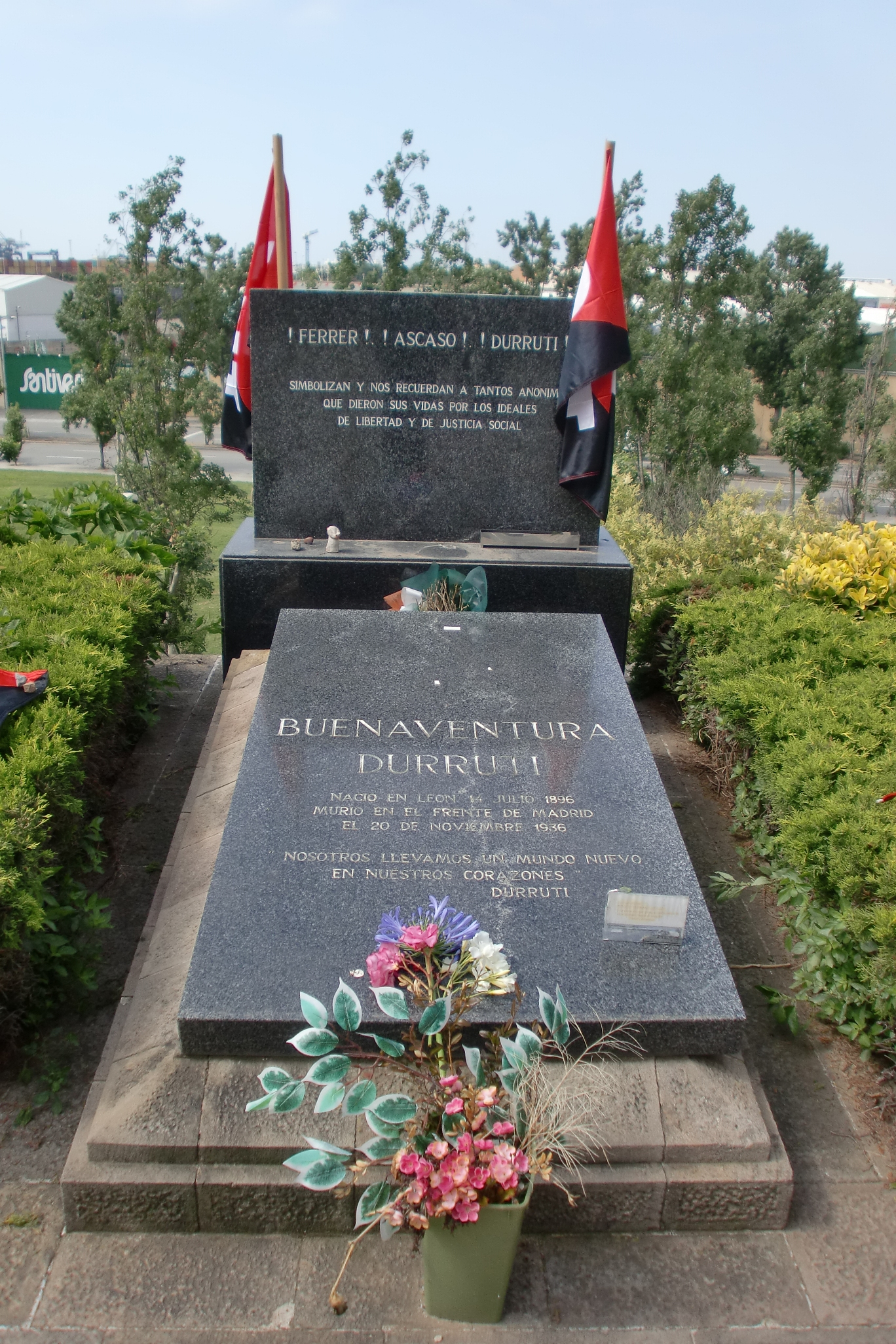
Durruti's grave in Montjuïc Cemetery

Catalan trade unionist Joan Ferrer described Durruti as a "born anarchist" and compared him to conquistadors such as Francisco Pizarro; Ferrer said that although "he acted out of instinct, perhaps he was even deluded, [...] for all that his temperament was that of a good man and by that I mean that his every impulse was solidarity". Ferrer admitted that, although Durruti was violent, he was also "good-natured at the same time", and said he did not believe the two were a contradiction of each other. Historian Antony Beevor compared him to a "revolutionary Robin Hood", Eric Hobsbawm called him a "noble gunman", and Burnett Bolloten described him as a "legendary hero" of the Spanish anarchist movement. According to historian Robert Kern, Durruti has been most remembered for "his role as the most proletarian European revolutionary leader". Kern compared his life story to that of Odysseus, likened the romanticisation of his exploits in Latin America to popular depictions of Butch Cassidy, and depicted his insurrectionary leadership during the Second Republic as "millenarian and impulsive". Historian Hugh Thomas described Durruti as having had "dreams of grandeur", but Bolloten, who had met Durruti before his death, disputed this characterisation. Kern described Durruti's life as "one of constant violent action", during which he killed "half a dozen men" and "planned even greater violence". He said that, although Durruti's "violent career" had been dedicated to mobilisation the masses for the overthrow of oppressive institutions, he may have been "too passionate and emotional, too rough and crude" to realise the societal change he wanted. On this, Kern also compared Durruti with the Argentine revolutionary Che Guevara, due to their shared populist ideology and revolutionary leadership qualities.

Durruti left behind no political or philosophical writings that clarified his personal perspectives. Federica Montseny described him as a "man of action" rather than a theoretician, saying he was "not one of those who sit at their desk while the others are fighting". Stalinist sources would portray Durruti as the first anarchist leader to have accepted the need for an army, although no anarchist sources claim him to have been a supporter of militarisation. Anarchist historians such as Abel Paz would present Durruti as an "intransigent opponent of militarisation", but this characterisation is likewise disputed by other historians, including Julián Casanova. English communist Humphrey Slater described Durruti as "an anarchist who fell as a disciplined member of the Spanish people's army" and believed his death was a loss to all Spanish republicans. Durruti's life and deeds were also celebrated by both civilians and state officials in the Soviet Union, where he was the only anarchist to receive coverage in the Stalinist press. The apocryphal slogan "we renounce everything except victory" was commonly attributed to Durruti, although there is no evidence of him saying it in any of his statements. It was commonly interpreted to mean that the gains of the revolution might have to be sacrificed in order to win the war. Republican authorities presented it as Durruti endorsing the state and militarisation. The slogan was later used as justification by the Communist Party of Spain (PCE) for the repression of anarchists and Trotskyists in the Red Terror. Émilienne Morin also reported that the Catholic Church, which had previously denounced Durruti for his anti-clericalism, later sought to canonise him as a "red Jesus". His daughter Colette likewise reported that "now he’s dead, they all want to claim him for their own [...] a dead revolutionary is always a good revolutionary". Abel Paz commented that "Durruti the hero killed Durruti the man".

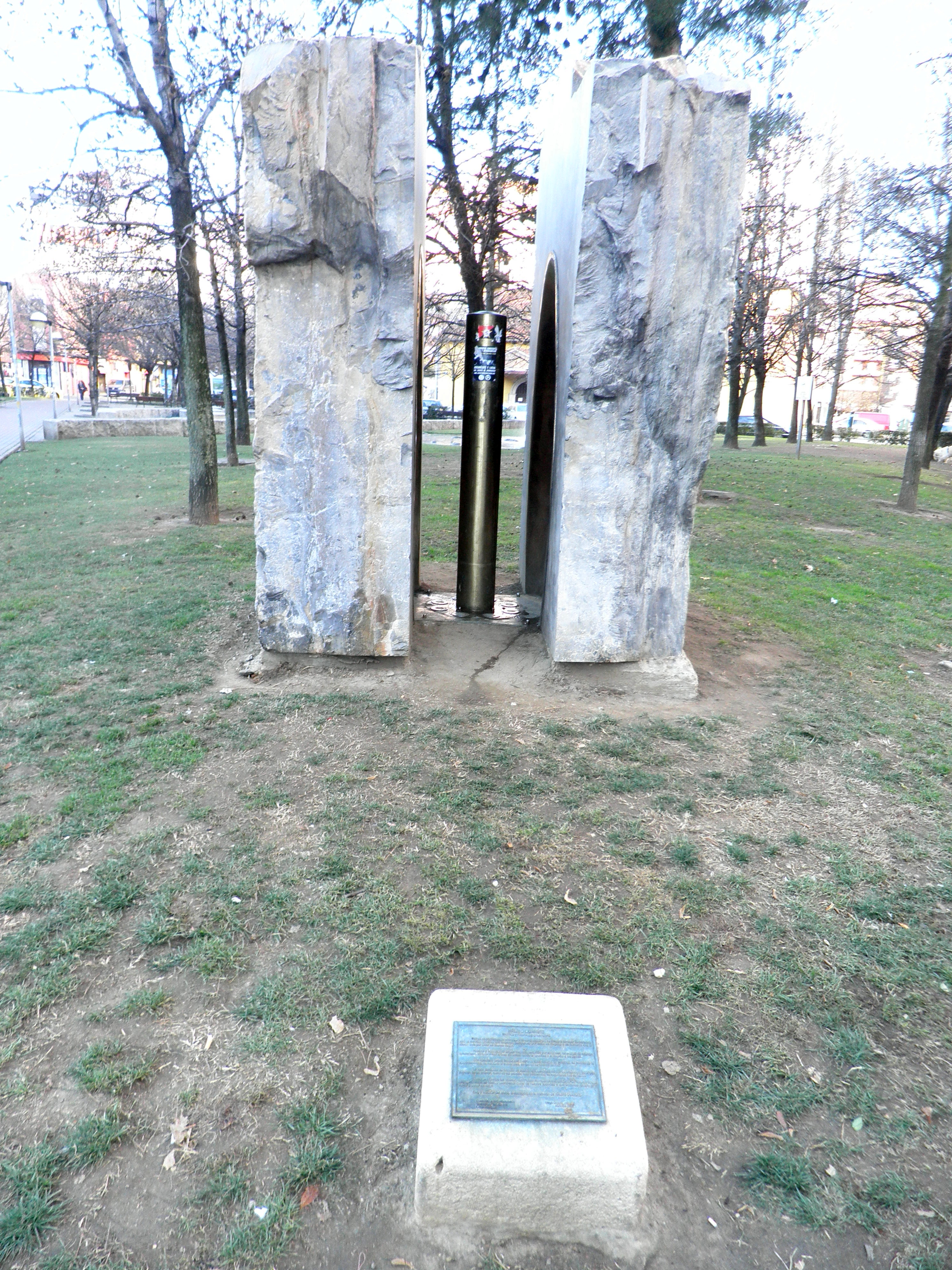
Monument to Durruti in his home city of León

After his death, Barcelona's Via Laietana was renamed to Via Durruti. In 1937, a newly established hospital in Binéfar was named after Durruti. An orphanage named after Durruti and Ascaso was established in Figueres, where it housed 200 refugee children from Madrid. In March 1937, the Catalan anarchist journalist Jaume Balius established the Friends of Durruti Group, named after Durruti. This group sought to oppose the policies of the CNT-FAI leadership, which it considered "counterrevolutionary", and aligned itself with Trotskyist organisations.

Durruti's death resulted in a loss of morale and enthusiasm among many Spanish revolutionaries. In the months after his death, the anarchist movement became increasingly disorientated and divided, and lost much of its influence in the Republic to the communists. According to the anarchist historian José Luis Gutiérrez Molina, Durruti's death marked the effective end of the Spanish Revolution of 1936, which soon gave way to the dismantling of revolutionary institutions and their integration into state structures. The Nationalists ultimately won the civil war on 1 April 1939. Ricardo Sanz reported that some anarchists believed they would have won the war if Durruti had not died. After the Spanish transition to democracy in the late 1970s, a square in Barcelona was renamed after Durruti. Biographies about Durruti have been written by Hans Magnus Enzensberger, Raimundo Ferrer, Joan Llarch and Abel Paz. The latter's biography on Durruti's life was originally published as Durruti: Le Peuple en Armes, in Paris in 1972. The book was translated from French by Nancy MacDonald, whose English language edition was published in Montreal in 1977. It also received translations into German, Italian, Japanese, Portuguese and Spanish. Paz published a second, expanded edition in the Spanish language in 1996, titling it Durruti en la Revolución española, and an English translation by Chuck Morse was published in 2006.

== See also ==
- Anarchism in Spain
- Anarchist Catalonia

== Bibliography ==
- Alexander, Robert J. (1999). The Anarchists in the Spanish Civil War. London: Janus Publishing Company. ISBN 978-1-85756-400-6.
- Alpert, Michael (2013). The Republican Army in the Spanish Civil War, 1936–1939. Cambridge University Press. ISBN 978-1-107-02873-9.
- Bayer, Osvaldo (2015) [1975]. The Anarchist Expropriators: Buenaventura Durruti and Argentina's Working-Class Robin Hoods. Oakland, California: AK Press. ISBN 978-1-84935-223-9. OCLC 908088288.
- Beevor, Antony (2006) [1982]. The Battle for Spain: The Spanish Civil War 1936–1939. London: Weidenfeld & Nicolson. ISBN 0-2978-4832-1.
- Bolloten, Burnet (1991). The Spanish Civil War: Revolution and Counterrevolution. University of North Carolina Press. ISBN 0-8078-1906-9. LCCN 89-77911.
- Bookchin, Murray (1978). The Spanish Anarchists: The Heroic Years 1868–1936. Harper & Row. ISBN 0-06-090607-3.
- Enzensberger, Hans Magnus (2018) [1972]. Anarchy's Brief Summer: The Life and Death of Buenaventura Durruti. Translated by Mitchell, Mike. Seagull Books. ISBN 9780857426000. OCLC 1077270536.
- Evans, Danny (12 October 2022). "A Pile of Ruins? Pierre van Paassen and the Mythical Durruti". Anarchist Studies. ISSN 0967-3393.
- Fraser, Ronald (2001) [1984]. "The popular experience of war and revolution 1936–9". In Preston, Paul (ed.). Revolution and War in Spain 1931–1939. London: Routledge. pp. 225–242. ISBN 0-415-09894-7. OCLC 803661954.
- Graham, Helen (2002). The Spanish Republic at War, 1936–1939. Cambridge: Cambridge University Press. ISBN 0-521-45932-X. OCLC 464890766.
- Herrerín, Ángel (2020). The Road to Anarchy: The CNT under the Spanish Second Republic (1931–1936). Sussex Academic Press. ISBN 9781789760316.
- Kern, Robert W. (1978). Red Years/Black Years: A Political History of Spanish Anarchism, 1911-1937. Institute for the Study of Human Issues. ISBN 0-915980-54-1. LCCN 77-13595.
- Paz, Abel (2006) [1996]. Durruti in the Spanish Revolution. Translated by Morse, Chuck. Edinburgh: AK Press. ISBN 1-904859-50-X. LCCN 2006920974. OCLC 482919277.
- Preston, Paul (2006). The Spanish Civil War: Reaction, Revolution, and Revenge. New York: W. W. Norton & Company. ISBN 0-393-32987-9.
- Ruiz, Julius (2014). The 'Red Terror' and the Spanish Civil War. Cambridge: Cambridge University Press. ISBN 9781107054547.
- Shantz, Jeff (2009). "Durruti, Buenaventura (1896–1936)". In Ness, Immanuel (ed.). The International Encyclopedia of Revolution and Protest. John Wiley & Sons. pp. 1–2. doi:10.1002/9781405198073.wbierp0482. ISBN 9781405198073.
- Thomas, Hugh (2001) [1961]. The Spanish Civil War. New York: Modern Library. ISBN 0-375-75515-2.
