= List of ministers of economy and finance of Catalonia =

Minister of Economy and Finance of Catalonia
- Conseller d'Economia i Hisenda de Catalunya
- Seal of the Generalitat of Catalonia

- Flag of Catalonia

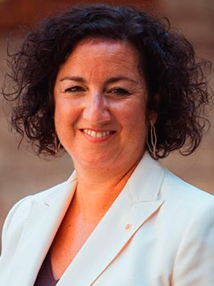
- Incumbent; Alicia Romero since 12 August 2024
- Department of Economy and Finance
- Member of: Executive Council of Catalonia
- Reports to: President of Catalonia
- Seat: Barcelona
- Appointer: President of Catalonia
- Inaugural holder: Manuel Serra Moret
- Formation: 15 April 1931
- Website: Department of the Vice-President and Economy and Finance, Catalonia

This article lists the councillors of economy and finance of Catalonia.

== List ==
Councillors of Economy
Name	Portrait	Party	Took office	Left office	President	Ministerial title	Refs
Manuel Serra Moret		Socialist Union of Catalonia	15 April 1931	3 October 1932	Francesc Macià	Minister of Economy and Labour	
Manuel Serra Moret		Socialist Union of Catalonia	3 October 1932	20 November 1932	Francesc Macià	Minister of Economy	
Antoni Xirau i Palau		Republican Left of Catalonia	19 December 1932	24 January 1933	Francesc Macià	Minister of Agriculture and Economy	
Pere Mias i Codina		Republican Left of Catalonia	24 January 1933	4 October 1933	Francesc Macià	Minister of Agriculture and Economy	
Joan Ventosa i Roig		Republican Left of Catalonia	4 October 1933	3 January 1934	Francesc Macià	Minister of Agriculture and Economy	
Joan Comorera		Socialist Union of Catalonia	3 January 1934	13 October 1934	Lluís Companys	Minister of Economy and Agriculture	
Joan Comorera		Socialist Union of Catalonia	1 March 1936	26 May 1936	Lluís Companys	Minister of Economy and Agriculture	
Lluís Prunés i Sató		Republican Left of Catalonia	26 May 1936	31 July 1936	Lluís Companys	Minister of Economy and Agriculture	
Joan Comorera		Unified Socialist Party of Catalonia	31 July 1936	6 August 1936	Lluís Companys	Minister of Economy	
Josep Tarradellas		Republican Left of Catalonia	6 August 1936	26 September 1936	Lluís Companys	Minister of Economy and Public Services	
Joan Porqueras i Fàbregas		Confederación Nacional del Trabajo	26 September 1936	17 December 1936	Lluís Companys	Minister of Economy	
Diego Abad de Santillán		Confederación Nacional del Trabajo	17 December 1936	3 April 1937	Lluís Companys	Minister of Economy	
Josep Juan i Domènech		Confederación Nacional del Trabajo	3 April 1937	16 April 1937	Lluís Companys	Minister of Economy, Public Services, Health and Social Assistance	
Andreu Capdevila i Puig		Confederación Nacional del Trabajo	16 April 1937	5 May 1937	Lluís Companys	Minister of Economy	
Valeri Mas i Casas		Confederación Nacional del Trabajo	5 May 1937	29 June 1937	Lluís Companys	Minister of Economy, Public Services, Health and Social Assistance	
Joan Comorera		Unión General de Trabajadores	29 June 1937	2 February 1939	Lluís Companys	Minister of Economy	
Joan Josep Folchi i Bonafonte		Union of the Democratic Centre	5 December 1977	19 October 1978	Josep Tarradellas	Minister of Economy and Finance	
Eduard Punset		Union of the Democratic Centre	19 October 1978	8 May 1980	Josep Tarradellas	Minister of Economy and Finance	
Ramon Trias Fargas		Democratic Convergence of Catalonia	8 May 1980	16 November 1982	Jordi Pujol	Minister of Economy and Finance	
Jordi Planasdemunt i Gubert		Democratic Convergence of Catalonia	16 November 1982	8 June 1983	Jordi Pujol	Minister of Economy and Finance	
Josep Maria Cullell i Nadal		Democratic Convergence of Catalonia	8 June 1983	23 April 1987	Jordi Pujol	Minister of Economy and Finance	
Josep Manuel Basáñez		Democratic Convergence of Catalonia	23 April 1987	4 July 1988	Jordi Pujol	Minister of Economy and Finance	
Ramon Trias Fargas		Democratic Convergence of Catalonia	4 July 1988	22 October 1989	Jordi Pujol	Minister of Economy and Finance	
Macià Alavedra		Democratic Convergence of Catalonia	22 October 1989	30 July 1997	Jordi Pujol	Minister of Economy and Finance	
Artur Mas		Democratic Convergence of Catalonia	30 July 1997	17 January 2001	Jordi Pujol	Minister of Economy and Finance	
Francesc Homs Ferret		Democratic Convergence of Catalonia	17 January 2001	17 December 2003	Jordi Pujol	Minister of Economy and Finance	
Antoni Castells		Socialists' Party of Catalonia	17 December 2003	29 December 2010	Pasqual Maragall	Minister of Economy and Finance	
Antoni Castells		Socialists' Party of Catalonia	17 December 2003	29 December 2010	José Montilla	Minister of Economy and Finance	
Andreu Mas-Colell		Independent	29 December 2010	27 December 2012	Artur Mas	Minister of Economy and Knowledge	
Andreu Mas-Colell		Democratic Convergence of Catalonia	27 December 2012	14 January 2016	Artur Mas	Minister of Economy and Knowledge	
Oriol Junqueras		Republican Left of Catalonia	14 January 2016	28 December 2017	Carles Puigdemont	Minister of Economy and Finance	
Pere Aragonès		Republican Left of Catalonia	2 June 2018	26 May 2021	Quim Torra	Minister of Economy and Finance	
Jaume Giró		Together for Catalonia	26 May 2021	10 October 2022	Pere Aragonès	Minister of Economy and Finance	
Natàlia Mas Guix		Republican Left of Catalonia	10 October 2022	12 August 2024	Pere Aragonès	Minister of Economy and Finance	
Alícia Romero		Socialists' Party of Catalonia	12 August 2024	Incumbent	Salvador Illa	Minister of Economy and Finance	
