= Andreu Capdevila =

Spanish trade unionist (1894–1987)

Minister of Economy of Catalonia
- In office 16 April – 5 May 1937
- President: Lluís Companys
- Prime Minister: Josep Tarradellas
- Preceded by: Josep Domènech
- Succeeded by: Valeri Mas

Personal details
- Born: Andreu Capdevila i Puig; 25 December 1894 Cardedeu, Vallès Oriental, Catalonia, Spain
- Died: 1987 (aged 92–93) Rennes, Brittany, France
- Spouse: Antònia Sánchez Garrido (m. 1937; died 1963)
- Occupation: Dyer

Military service
- Allegiance: Spanish Republic
- Branch/service: Confederal militias
- Years of service: 1936
- Battles/wars: July 1936 military uprising in Barcelona
- Organisation: National Confederation of Labour
- Movement: Anarchism in Spain

Andreu Capdevila i Puig (1894–1987) was a Catalan textile worker, trade unionist and politician. As a member of the National Confederation of Labour (CNT), he became a leader of textile workers at the Fabra i Coats factory in Sant Andreu de Palomar. He participated in the suppression of the July 1936 military uprising in Barcelona, leading the storming of the Sant Andreu artillery barracks, and oversaw the collectivisation of the Fabra i Coats company during the Spanish Revolution of 1936. He then joined the Economic Council established by the Catalan government and oversaw the drafting of its Collectivisation Decree. In April 1937, he was appointed as the Catalan government's Minister of Economy, a post he served in until the May Days. He spent the rest of the war resisting attempts by his successor, Joan Comorera, to abolish the collectivisations. With the fall of Barcelona, Capdevila joined the evacuation of Republicans from the country. He spent the rest of his life in France, where he continued organising for the CNT and writing about his experiences in the Spanish Civil War.

== Biography ==
=== Early life and activism ===
Andreu Capdevila i Puig was born in the small Catalan town of Cardedeu, on Christmas Day in 1894. At a young age, his family moved to Sant Andreu de Palomar, a neighbourhood in the north of Barcelona. When he was 13-years-old, Capdevila began working as a dyer at the Fabra i Coats textile factory. He said that he began to rebel when he witnessed the exploitation of labour at the factory and that he was especially incensed by the abuse of women in the workplace. He soon joined the textile workers' union of the National Confederation of Labour (CNT), an anarcho-syndicalist trade union center. He soon made friends with a number of naturists, syndicalists and vegetarians. He himself refused to drink or smoke, preferring instead to spend his time reading.

By the age of 20, he became a leading figure in the CNT's Catalan regional branch. Throughout the 1920s, the Fabra i Coats factory grew substantially, becoming one of the most important factories in Spain's growing textile industry and consequently raising Capdevila's stature among textile workers' unions. He was offered a promotion to become a supervisor, but he refused as he did not want to exploit other workers. Following the proclamation of the Second Spanish Republic, Capdevila was among the anarchists who opposed the revolutionary insurrections of January 1932, January 1933 and December 1933, believing they harmed the efforts of the CNT to organise the working class. On election days, Capdevila left Barcelona early in the morning to go hiking in the mountains, so he could avoid the politics of electoralism.

=== Revolution in Sant Andreu ===
When the Popular Front won the 1936 Spanish general election, Capdevila remarked that the working class had voted for the decisive suppression of fascism. However, he believed that the Republican government would fail to carry out this mandate, because it was more afraid of the workers than the military, and that the workers would have to suppress the rise of fascism themselves. When the July 1936 military uprising in Barcelona took place, Capdevila took up arms and went into the streets to fight against the Nationalists. Capdevila and his fellow CNT militants stormed the artillery barracks in Sant Andreu, aided by aerial bombardment from the Spanish Republican Air Force. By the time the Civil Guard arrived to take control of the situation, Capdevila's militia had already captured the barracks and was distributing 30,000 rifles to the people outside. The distribution was chaotic, with Capdevila remarking that they did not know who they were giving weapons to or even if they were fascists. He subsequently decided to form a commission to distribute the remaining 10,000 rifles, which he restricted to revolutionary organisations.

Once they had defeated the uprising, on 20 July, the workers of Catalonia proclaimed the beginning of a revolution. Capdevila claimed that the CNT had only taken up arms to defend themselves, not to carry out a revolution, but that Catalan anarcho-syndicalist workers had seized the opportunity to make a revolution once it presented itself. Capdevila oversaw the collectivisation of the Fabra i Coats factory, establishing a factory committee to oversee production. Capdevila faced difficulties promoting the collectivisation to the company's more conservative workers, as the company had better working conditions than other privately owned textile companies and continued to function on a full-time basis, even generating substantial surplus products.

But when sales collapsed and company's cash reserves depleted, the company management cut working hours in order to restrict the payment of wages and continue paying dividends to shareholders. After management rejected proposals by a popular assembly to resolve the dispute, the company's workers voted to collectivise the factory. They established a works council, which took over management of the factory, while also leaving the former managers in their positions. The committee was able to reestablish weekly wages for workers by eliminating "useless jobs" and ending the payment of dividends. Capdevila reported that the workers organised a library, established a publication and held classes in language and mathematics. They also abolished piece work, which the CNT textile unions had demanded for a long time, causing a 40% drop in production output. To resolve the issue of falling production, they called another popular assembly and intervened directly on the shop floor to encourage workers to increase their output, eventually resulting in production increasing to 70% of its pre-collectivisation output. Capdevila reported that, following collectivisation, workers were more willing to speak up about issues they had in the workplace, feeling that they were now the ones in charge of running the company.

=== On the Economic Council ===
On 13 August 1936, the Catalan government established an Economic Council (Catalan: Consell d'Economia) to oversee the organisation of the economy of Catalonia. Capdevila was chosen to represent the CNT on the new body as its delegate-president, while his fellow CNT member Joan Porqueras i Fàbregas served as the Minister of Economy. Capdevila attempted to avoid taking this post, telling the CNT regional committee that he preferred to continue working at his factory and believed he would be better placed there than on the council. He believed it to be a mistake for the CNT to participate in political institutions, holding to the maxim that "power corrupts". He suffered from extreme anxiety and self-doubt over his new position, but recovered shortly before the first meeting. He reported that, throughout the first several meetings of the Economic Council, the UGT and the Republican political parties collaborated constructively with the CNT.

While preparing a decree for the collectivisation of the Catalan economy, Capdevila attended to other economic issues. When he discovered that different organisations were all individually engaging in international trade, he oversaw the centralisation of Catalonia's international trade under the Economic Council. He also solicited permission from the Spanish Republican government for Catalonia to autonomously engage in international trade, under the condition that the foreign exchange reserves earned from Catalan exports would be turned over to the Spanish government.

By 22 October 1936, Capdevila had finalised the draft for a Collectivisation Decree and presented it to the economic council. He reported discussions over the decree to have faced difficulties, with the UGT-PSUC attempting to minimise the extent of the collectivisation, while the CNT-FAI attempted to maximise it. At 03:00, on 23 October, the Economic Council finally agreed to the decree and passed it along to the Minister of Economy, who subsequently passed it along to the Catalan government. On 24 October 1936, the Catalan government enacted the collectivisation decree, despite opposition from the Unified Socialist Party of Catalonia (PSUC) and the Republican Left of Catalonia (ERC), which respectively favoured nationalisation and liberalisation of the economy. The final version of the decree represented a compromise between the various different trade unions and political parties. When Diego Abad de Santillán took over as Minister of Economy, he attempted to ignore the decree and allow collectivisation to occur through spontaneous order, but he was not in the post for long enough to interfere with its implementation. Over the subsequent months, dozens of enterprises representing tens of thousands of workers were collectivised and extended legal recognition. In 1937, he married Antònia Sánchez Garrido and moved from Sant Andreu into the centre of Barcelona.

=== Minister of Economy ===
On 16 April 1937, Lluís Companys reshuffled his government, appointing Capdevila as the new Minister of Economy. One of his first acts as minister was to renounce his official state car and police escort. Political tensions within the new cabinet prevented it from agreeing on a common programme, and it collapsed into internal divisions within two weeks. According to Capdevila, while the CNT had wanted to finish consolidating the revolution so they could then win the war, the communists sought to win the war first before making a revolution.

Tensions exploded into open conflict between anarchist and communist workers, some of whom had started killing each other, which appalled Capdevila. He attempted to raise the issue at a cabinet meeting, but reported that the Stalinist Joan Comorera coldly responded that the workers killing each other was "of no particular importance". Capdevila quickly became disillusioned by his participation in the government. He remained in post as Minister of Economy until the May Days, when he was returned to his post as the Economic Council's delegate-president.

=== Defence of collectivisation ===
In the wake of the May Days, Joan Comorera took over as Minister of Economy in Catalonia and sought to abolish the collectivisation decree. Capdevila reported that Comorera ignored the authority of the Economic Council and regularly ordered restitution for business owners, but that the CNT-FAI members of the Council were able to prevent him from replacing workers' self-management with technocratic administration. When the Spanish government under Juan Negrín moved its headquarters to Barcelona in October 1937, Capdevila reported that workers' collectives came even further under attack, as the sub-secretariat of supply gave preference to give contracts to private firms over collectivised ones. Capdevila also doubted the Republican loyalties of many PSUC members that Comorera appointed to represent the government in negotiations with the collectives.

Up until the end of the war, a significant number of collectivised enterprises were not legally recognised. In August 1938, the Economic Council held several discussions to attempt to resolve the issue of illegal collectivised enterprises. Capdevila's suggestion, that the illegal collectivised enterprises be allowed to continue operating while they studied a pathway to legalisation, was approved. As the Nationalists advanced in their Catalonia Offensive, Capdevila reported that members of Catalan Republican Action attempted to repeal the collectivisation decree, but that CNT-FAI representatives were able to prevent them from doing so until the fall of Barcelona. Despite Comorera forcing Capdevila out of his post as delegate-president, he remained a member of the Economic Council until the end of the war.

=== Evacuation and exile ===
On 22 January 1939, as the Nationalist forces closed in around Barcelona, Capdevila and his wife Antònia discussed what they should do. Capdevila observed Republicans fleeing the city en masse, which he described in terms of human capital flight, as Spain lost its many of its most skilled workers, artistss and intellectuals. Capdevila warned his family that they should stay together and try not to get separated from each other, as it would be difficult to reestablish contact. He discussed the situation with other members of the CNT at their headquarters, then went back to his family and told them they had to leave the city, declaring that staying would mean certain death. They packed their suitcases and left immediately.

They left not knowing how, when or where their journey would end. They started their journey by car. Capdevila reported that he was "haunted by the sound of aircraft" while making his journey. They stayed for the night in Girona, the centre of the evacuation network, where they were able to sleep on the floor of a trade union office, while most people slept in the streets. Capdevila and Antònia were separated from each other, as Antònia went ahead of him in an ambulance, but they were reunited a few days later in Figueres. Eventually they reached Llançà, where they had to get out of their car and walk to the border. Capdevila insisted on making the crossing at night, in order to avoid getting caught in an aerial attack. After crossing, Capdevila was held in Cervera for three days, while the French authorities considered whether to allow able-bodied men into the country. He recalled being bullied by the French police and border guards, who he said "shouted like maniacs". He accused the French authorities of sadism for their treatment of the Spanish refugees.

When Capdevila and Antónia were finally reunited in France, they first moved to Canet, then to Perpinyà. After the liberation of France, Capdevila spoke at a series of meetings and conferences throughout Occitania. He also joined the orthodox faction of the CNT, which opposed cooperation with the Spanish Republican government in exile. In the 1960s, he was elected as secretary of the CNT's relations commission in the regions of Aude and Northern Catalonia, a position from which he opposed the militancy of Defensa Interior. In the final years of his life, he lived in the city of Rennes in Brittany, where he contributed to a number of anarchist and syndicalist publications and wrote a book about the evacuation of Republicans from Spain. During the Spanish transition to democracy, he was recognised by Sant Andreu de Palomar for his work in revolutionary Catalonia. He died in Rennes in 1987.

== Selected works ==
- Un episodio de nuestra evacuación a Francia (1978)

== Bibliography ==
- Alexander, Robert J. (1999). The Anarchists in the Spanish Civil War. London: Janus Publishing Company. ISBN 978-1-85756-400-6.
- Bolloten, Burnett (1991). The Spanish Civil War: Revolution and Counterrevolution. University of North Carolina Press. ISBN 978-0-8078-1906-7.
- Evans, Danny (2018). Revolution and the State: Anarchism in the Spanish Civil War, 1936–1939. Routledge. ISBN 978-1-138-06314-3.
- Fraser, Ronald (1979). Blood of Spain: The Experience of Civil War, 1936-1939. Penguin Books. ISBN 0-7139-1085-2.
- Fraser, Ronald (2002) [1984]. "The Popular Experience of War and Revolution 1936–9". Revolution and War in Spain, 1931-1939. Routledge. pp. 225–242. doi:10.4324/9780203222225-11 (inactive 6 July 2025). ISBN 0-203-22222-9.
- Gemie, Sharif; Reid, Fiona; Humbert, Laure (2012). "The Retirada: Spanish Republican Refugees, 1939". Outcast Europe: Refugees and Relief Workers in an Era of Total War 1936-48. Continuum International Publishing Group. pp. 29–53. ISBN 978-1-4411-4683-0.
- Pagès i Blanch, Pelai (2013) [2007]. War and Revolution in Catalonia, 1936–1939. Translated by Gallagher, Patrick. Brill. ISBN 978-90-04-25426-8.
- Vinyes i Roig, Pau (2009). "Andreu Capdevila i Puig, l'altre conseller andreuenc" [Andreu Capdevila i Puig, the other minister from Sant Andreu]. Finestrelles (in Catalan) (14): 169–72. ISSN 1130-0272.
