= Valeri Mas =

Spanish politician and trade unionist (1894-1973)

Minister of Economy, Public Services, Health and Social Assistance of Catalonia
- In office 5 May – 28 June 1937
- President: Lluís Companys
- Preceded by: Andreu Capdevila (economy); Josep Domènech (public services); Aurelio Fernández (health)
- Succeeded by: Joan Comorera (economy); Antoni Maria Sbert (health)

Personal details
- Born: Valeri Mas Casas; 22 May 1894 Sant Martí de Provençals, Barcelona, Catalonia, Spain
- Died: 19 July 1973 (aged 79) Lissac, Aquitània, France
- Occupation: Textile worker
- Organisation: National Confederation of Labour
- Movement: Anarchism in Spain

Valeri Mas Casas (Note: Also known by the Spanish: Valerio Mas.) (1894-1973) was a Catalan trade unionist and politician. A textile worker by trade, he became a leader of his sector's trade union in the National Confederation of Labour (CNT). During the early months of the Spanish Civil War, he oversaw supply chain management in Revolutionary Catalonia and became general secretary of the Catalan regional branch of the CNT. He was among the anarchist leaders who called for a ceasefire during the May Days, following which he joined the Catalan government as its economy minister, among other combined portfolios. From this position, he protected collectivisation and workers' control over the Catalan economy, overseeing the legalisation of several industrial collectives. After a month, he was forced out of his post and replaced by Joan Comorera, who attempted to roll back collectivisation, although Mas continued to defend it within the Economic Council up until the end of the war. After the fall of Barcelona in 1939, he fled to France, where he formed the Spanish Libertarian Movement (MLE) and joined the orthodox faction of the CNT, which opposed collaboration with the Spanish Republican government in exile.

== Biography ==
Valeri Mas Casas was born in Sant Martí de Provençals, a neighbourhood in the north of Barcelona, on 22 May 1894. A textile worker by trade, he joined the National Confederation of Labour (CNT). He took a leading role among the Catalan textile workers of the CNT, becoming a prominent trade union leader in the textile industry of Granollers. In 1926, he was also elected as president of the liberal circle of L'Hospitalet.

=== Civil War ===
Following the outbreak of the Spanish Civil War, Mas represented the CNT on Catalonia's central supply committee, a branch of the Central Committee of Antifascist Militias of Catalonia (CCMA) which coordinated supply chain management in the region. In the first month of the war, he oversaw the stabilisation of the supply system in Catalonia through a system of committees. In November 1936, he succeeded Mariano R. Vázquez as the general secretary of the Catalan branch of the CNT, a post he served in until May 1937. Throughout the war, he was a proponent of anarchist collaboration with the Republican government and rejected the position of the Workers' Party of Marxist Unification (POUM) on the need to suppress Stalinism. On 21 January 1937, he signed a joint statement with members of the Unified Socialist Party of Catalonia (PSUC) and General Workers' Union (UGT), calling for workers of each organisation to cease hostilities against each other.

At the outbreak of the May Days, when Assault Guards laid siege to the anarchist-held Telefónica building on Plaça de Catalunya, Mas was among the members of the Catalan anarchist leadership who attempted to convince both sides to ceasefire. As general secretary of the Catalan CNT, Mas met with Catalan prime minister Josep Tarradellas and interior minister Artemi Aiguader to request the withdrawal of the police from the building. The two ministers assured Mas that they did not know about the events that were occurring, although Aiguade himself was later found to have ordered the attack. The Catalan CNT then announced that it would attempt to compel the police to withdraw, and requested that the workers of Barcelona remain calm.

Mas called up Joan Garcia Oliver, the anarchist minister of justice in the Republican government, to come to Barcelona and appeal for a ceasefire. Mas later convinced Juan Manuel Molina to turn over control of military forces in Catalonia and Aragon to Sebastián Pozas, assuring him as general secretary of the Catalan CNT that their organisation had agreed to do so. By 7 May, sustained appeals from the anarchist leadership finally secured a ceasefire.

=== Economy minister of Catalonia ===
Following the May Days, Mas joined a reorganised Catalan government, which was provisionally reduced to only four ministers. Mas served multiple roles as minister of economy, health and public services. Dionís Eroles took over from him as general secretary of the Catalan CNT. Mas' main focus as a minister was on the economy, as he sought to ensure that the Catalan war industry continued to be supplied with raw materials. After two chemical plants were damaged in an aerial bombardment, he oversaw the repair and reopening of one of them, although the other one was closed down as it was beyond repair.

For a month and a half, Mas managed to protect workers' control over the Catalan economy. When the Economic Council of Catalonia moved to inquire to the Republican government as to whether they were constitutionally allowed them to decree collectivisation, Mas rejected the proposal. On 21 May, he declared that they had already gone beyond the limited powers afforded to them by the Statute of Autonomy of Catalonia, but that they had done so to carry out the work of the social revolution. He obliged the Council to put the decree into force, autonomously, without permission from the Spanish government. As a result, the Economic Council never appealed to the Republican government for permission. Mas oversaw the legalisation of 40 industrial collectives, but pressure by the PSUC on the Catalan president Lluís Companys prevented him from legalising the rest, despite the Economic Council having already approved their legalisation. On 11 June, he also signed a government decree proclaiming the municipalisation of urban housing developments.

Mas served in the government until the end of June 1937, when the CNT was finally forced out of the Catalan government. According to Mas, the CNT had found it difficulty to field any candidates who were willing to collaborate with a government which they perceived as a barrier to reaching their economic goals. He was replaced as economy minister by Joan Comorera, who brought an end to nine months of CNT control over the Economic Council and subsequently abolished collectivisation.

=== Defence of collectivisation ===
Mas continued to work in the Catalan Economic Council up until the Nationalists carried out the Catalonia Offensive in late 1938. By this time, the socialists and republicans were attempting to put a definitive end to anarchist collectivisation efforts. In mid-October 1937, representatives of Catalan Republican Action (ACR), declaring they had gone too far in their economic reforms and alienated foreign democratic powers from intervening, presented three drafts for the repeal of the collectivisation decree.

The ACR received support from the Republican Left of Catalonia (ERC), PSUC and UGT, but they were strongly opposed by the CNT, who emphatically stated that democratic states would not help them against the Nationalists under any circumstances. The draft resolutions were subsequently withdrawn and no compromise was reached in the negotiations of the following six weeks. Up until the Fall of Barcelona, Republican officials continued pushing to repeal the collectivisation decree, but CNT were ultimately able to prevent it from going forward.

=== Exile ===
When Barcelona fell, Mas fled through Girona to France. There he co-founded the Spanish Libertarian Movement (MLE) and joined its general council, representing the Catalan branch of the CNT. In September 1939, he was interned at Camp Vernet. After the battle of France, the Vichy government transferred him to the Djefa labour camp in North Africa.

When Nazi Germany was defeated and World War II ended, in 1945, Mas attended the Paris Congress of the CNT-in-exile and joined the organisation's orthodox faction, which opposed collaboration with the Spanish Republican government in exile. He was elected as the organisation's international secretary, appointed as a representative of the MLE in North Africa and delegated by the CNT-in-exile to the 1953 congress of the International Workers' Association (AIT). He also wrote for Tierra y Libertad, while it was based in Mexico.

Later in his life, Mas corresponded with the historian Burnett Bolloten, becoming a primary source for his book on the Spanish Civil War. Valeri Mas ultimately lived the rest of his life in exile, dying in Lissac on 18 July 1973.

== Bibliography ==
- Alexander, Robert J. (1999). The Anarchists in the Spanish Civil War. London: Janus Publishing Company. ISBN 978-1-85756-400-6.
- Bolloten, Burnet (1991). The Spanish Civil War: Revolution and Counterrevolution. University of North Carolina Press. ISBN 0-8078-1906-9. LCCN 89-77911.
- Íñiguez, Miguel (2001). "Mas Casas, Valeriano". Esbozo de una enciclopedia histórica del anarquismo español (in Spanish). Madrid: Fundación de Estudios Libertarios Anselmo Lorenzo. p. 392. ISBN 9788486864453. OCLC 807322760.
- Pagès i Blanch, Pelai (2013) [2007]. War and Revolution in Catalonia, 1936–1939. Translated by Gallagher, Patrick. Brill. ISBN 978-90-04-25426-8.
- Peirats, Josep (1998) [1977]. Anarchists in the Spanish Revolution. Translated by Solcombe, Ann; Hollow, Paul. Freedom Press. ISBN 0-900384-53-0.
- Peirats, Josep (2005). Ealham, Chris (ed.). The CNT in the Spanish Revolution. Vol. 2. Translated by Sharkey, Paul; Ealham, Chris. Christie Books}. ISBN 1-873976-24-0.
- Richards, Vernon (2019) [1953]. Lessons of the Spanish Revolution. PM Press. ISBN 978-1-62963-647-4. LCCN 2018949093.
