= Josep Irla =

Catalan politician (1874-1958)

The Right Honourable Josep Irla i Bosch
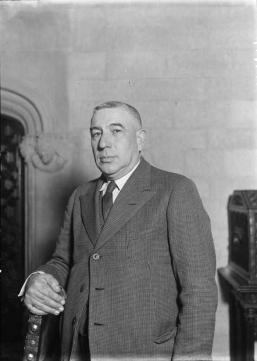
- Josep Irla, Catalonian president in exile during 1940–1954

124th President of the Government of Catalonia (in exile)
- In office 15 October 1940 – 7 August 1954 (In exile)
- Preceded by: Lluís Companys
- Succeeded by: Josep Tarradellas

3rd President of the Parliament of Catalonia
- In office 1 October 1938 – 15 October 1940
- Preceded by: Joan Casanovas i Maristany
- Succeeded by: Antoni Rovira

Personal details
- Born: 24 October 1874 Sant Feliu de Guíxols, Baix Empordà, Catalonia, Kingdom of Spain
- Died: 19 September 1958 (aged 83) Saint-Raphaël, Provence, French Fourth Republic
- Party: Republican Left of Catalonia

Josep Irla i Bosch (Catalan pronunciation: [ʒuˈzɛp ˈiɾləj ˈβɔsk]; 24 October 1874 – 19 September 1958) was a Catalan businessman and politician. He was a deputy in the Parliament of Catalonia and the Spanish Congress in 1932, as an Esquerra Republicana de Catalunya affiliate. He was also the last President of Parliament of Catalonia at the end of Republican Catalan resistance in the Spanish Civil War, before Francisco Franco abolished the Generalitat of Catalonia. He was elected President of the Parliament of Catalonia on 1 October 1938. (Note: "Por 36 votos a favor y 4 en blanco, es elegido presidente don José Irla Bosch. Este pasa a sentarse en la presidencia, y la Cámara, en pie, la dedica una cariñosa ovación.") In office, Irla pushed for cooperation with the allies, Basque nationalists and other anti-Francoist groups, though excluding the communists. He became the President-in-exile of the Generalitat after Lluís Companys was executed. During his time as President-in-exile, he established a Government in exile, and appointed Josep Tarradellas as Conseller en Cap (Prime Minister). He resigned as President in 1954.

== Early years ==
Josep Irla i Bosch was born on 24 October 1874 in Sant Feliu de Guíxols, Baix Empordà. He was the eldest of the three sons of Josep Irla i Rovira, and Rita Bosch Anglada. His father was a laborer who later opened a tavern known as Cas Romagué. His younger brothers were Francesc (1881–1961) and Nicolau (1886–1943), with whom he always maintained a very close relationship, sharing business and political activities. He worked in his father's inn when he was young, and studied at the Academy of Arts and Crafts. He did not follow any higher study, but was self-taught.

Irla gradually made his way into the world of business and politics. With his brothers, he began industrial and commercial activities in Sant Feliu de Guíxols. He created the company Josep Irla & Co. using the capital of the three brothers. From this base, they opened a factory, producing cork stoppers, that grew over the years. They were consignees of boats and owned a schooner, with which they traded in wine and cork with Barcelona, acting as customs agents. In 1902, Irla married Florence Bas i Parent, also of Sant Feliu de Guixols and descendant of a family of workers. The couple had no children, but they had two godchildren, Encarnació Pijoan, daughter of peasants from a farm from Romanyà de la Selva, and Lola Aymerich, a cousin who was orphaned.

== Early political career ==
When Irla was young he followed the family tradition and identified with federal republicanism. He and his father were the drivers of the Catalan Republican Federal Center of Sant Feliu de Guíxols. They were also members of the Masonic Lodge. His brother Francis was the leader of the weekly The Program.

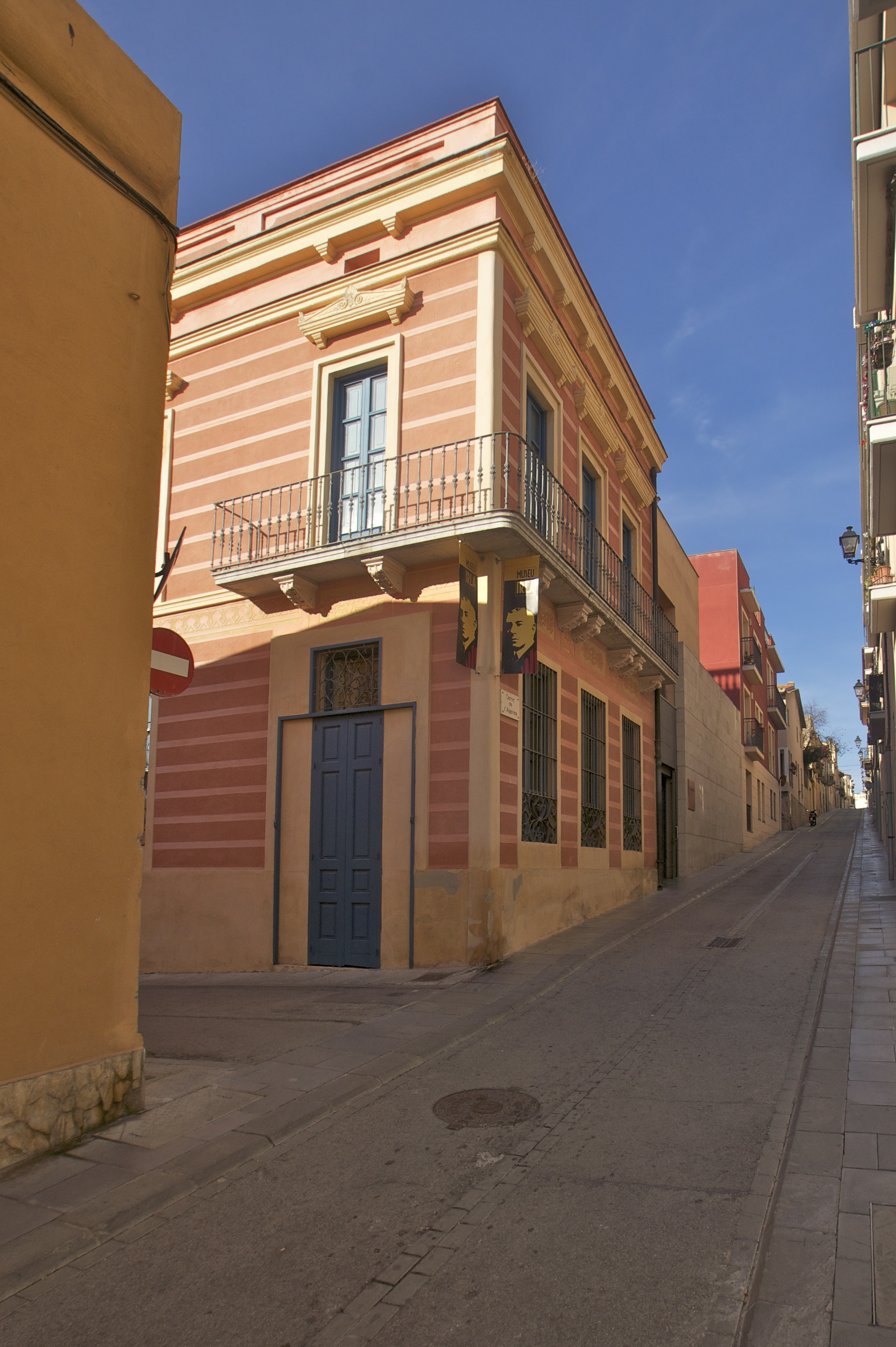
Irla Museum in Sant Feliu de Guíxols

Irla was a pioneer of Catalan republicanism in the region. In a 1905 municipal election, he was elected councilor of the Municipality of Sant Feliu de Guíxols as candidate of Republican Federal Center. He was second deputy mayor and member of the Government Commission. After several changes he became mayor and chaired the City Council from 1906 until 1910. During his term in office he highlighted creation of public services and works, social assistance, promotion of popular culture and an economically austere administration, faced with the damage suffered in the municipality during heavy rains in 1908. He followed the events of Catalan political life and defined a Catalan nationalist and progressive sense. At the beginning of 1911, he participated in the establishment of the Republican Nationalist Federal Union, in the regions of Gerona and was president of the local branch.

Following the death of his father, then provincial deputy, Irla was presented to the provincial election was called to fill the vacancy in the district of La Bisbal. He got the appointment without election for lack of opponents. In the provincial elections of 1913, he was chosen as deputy again, and it happened on until 1923, with the arrival of the dictatorship of Primo de Rivera, provided by the District of La Bisbal. From his position as deputy, he became involved in the government institution: the Commonwealth of Catalonia. He was a major contributor to the first president of the Commonwealth of Catalonia, Enric Prat de la Riba, and after his death, he continued to occupy positions of great responsibility chaired by Josep Puig i Cadafalch. He was also a member of the board of the Fund Credit Communal.

With the liquidation of the institutions by the dictatorship of Miguel Primo de Rivera (1923–30) Irla focused on his business while maintaining some political activity. He always maintained a certain political activity within the small scope of action of that period.

== Second Spanish Republic and Generalitat of Catalonia ==
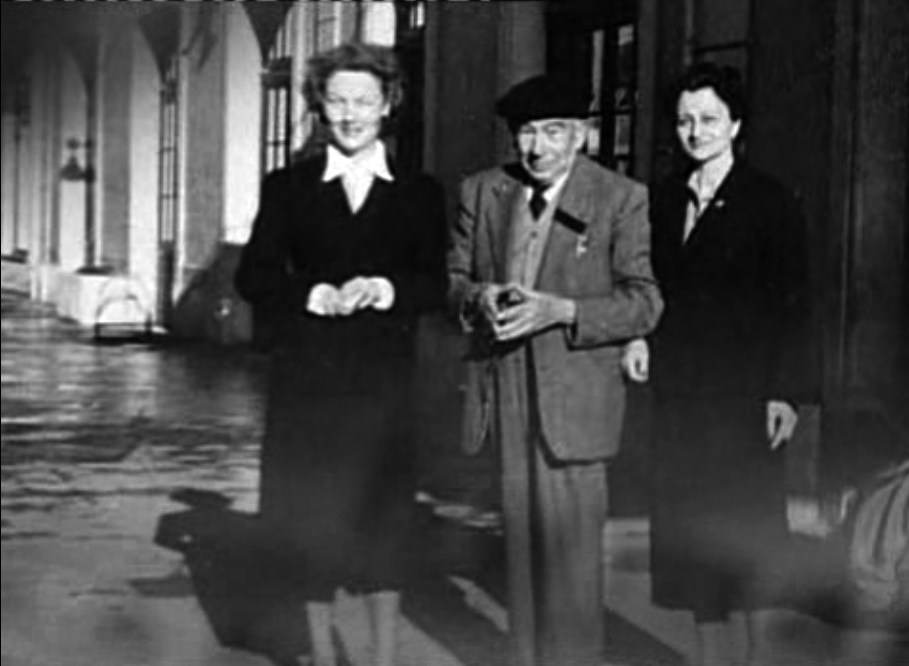
Josep Irla and Bosch with his two goddaughters, Lola Aymerich to his left and Encarnació Pijoan (Ción) to his right, year approximated 1953

After the defeat of the dictatorship, with the proclamation of the Republic Irla was appointed member of the Provisional Provincial Committee of Girona. Immediately after this, Catalan President Francesc Macià named him Commissioner Delegate of the Government of the Generalitat in Girona. In this position, he favored education and culture, especially targeting the popular sectors, promoted the use of the Catalan language in the administration, renewed action for the restoration of archaeological monuments, became interested in social work, and developed public works at low cost with a high impact on large sections of the population.

In the elections for the Provincial Government of Catalonia, an organization was created to prepare and approve a draft statute for the autonomy of Catalonia. Irla and Lluís Companys were chosen vice presidents. Irla was involved in creating the draft statute of autonomy known as the Statute of Núria. On 9 September 1932, the Statute of Catalonia was approved definitively. In early 1932, he created and directed the Federal Republican Party of the Baix Empordà, a county group created basically to formalize a collective commitment to the Republican Left of Catalonia, which he did in the First National Congress of this political formation.

In the elections of the Parliament of Catalonia 20 November 1932, he headed the candidacy of Republican Left of Catalonia in the province of Girona. The victory was total and he was the candidate with the highest proportion of votes in Catalonia. Throughout the republican period, he held various positions of responsibility within the Government of Catalonia.

Irla was appointed General Director of the Interior during the administration of President Macià, but worsening asthma prevented him from taking office, and he was replaced after a few days by Joan Selves. Having recovered, he was appointed Director General of Industry (1933), under the Ministry of Industry and Trade of the Republican Spanish government, in the two successive governments headed by Manuel Azaña and Alejandro Lerroux, was dismissed after the rise to power of President Diego Martinez Barrio.

In the summer of 1933, he joined the Department of Social Welfare, later becoming Director General of the Department of Social Welfare. In this capacity, he directed projects for the treatment of patients at risk of social exclusion, risk prevention in childhood, and care to retirees without resources. The events of October 1934, with the suspension of the Statute and imprisonment of all members of the Catalan government, put on hold its political action for the next year and a half.

In 1936, with the restoration of the Government of Catalonia, Irla regained his place as Director General. However, the start of the Spanish Civil War hindered his political activity. He assumed leadership of the board of the Hospital General de Catalunya. With successive remodeling of the government, he remained in office, but he resigned before the appointment of Antonio García as Director, representative of the National Confederation of Labour (CNT). Soon after, in October 1936, he was appointed undersecretary of the Ministry of Culture, a newly created position, with Ventura Gassol as a counselor. Gassol fled to France, having defended threatened people. Therefore, Irla had to expand his role and worked for the functioning of the schools and continued his support for the preservation of archaeological and artistic heritage of Catalonia.

In January 1937, just after President Josep Tarradellas published the decrees which sought to control and provide standards for the entire financial system of Catalonia, Irla was appointed Director General of Heritage and Revenue.

== President of the Parliament of Catalonia ==
On 1 October 1938, with part of the Catalan territory occupied by Nationalist's troops and imminent defeat, Irla agreed to become President of the Catalan Parliament. In his inauguration to the presidency, he said: "We were, we are and will be republicans and Catalans, because we are liberals, because it is a feeling of our soul that has led us to feel and know the needs of our people."

== Exile ==
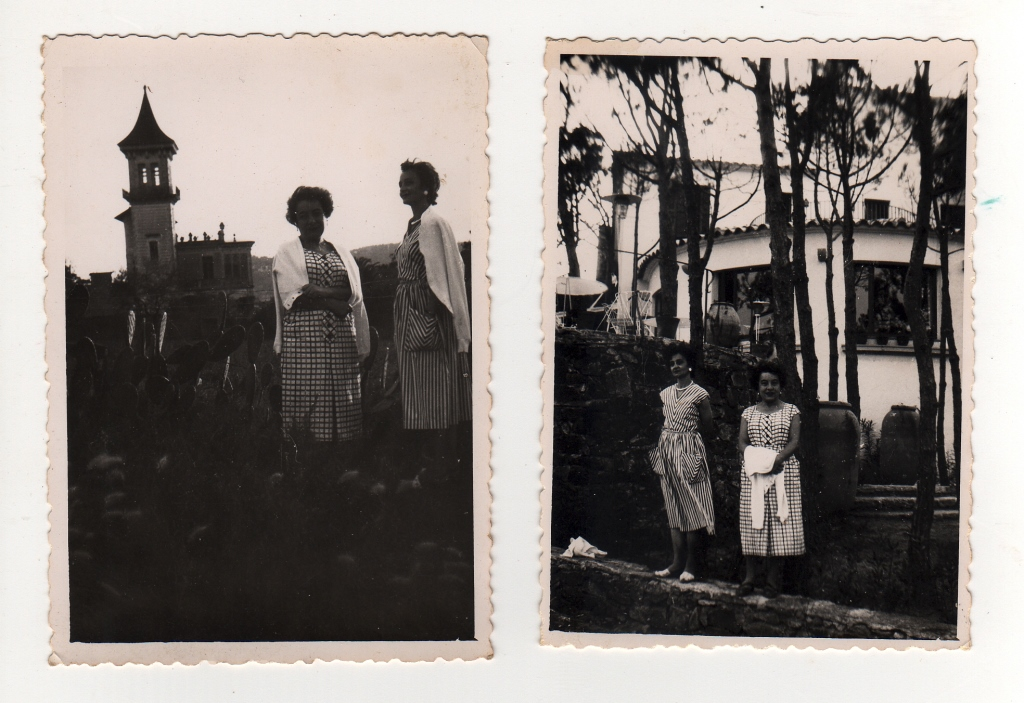
Villa Catalonia residence in exile of President Josep Irla, with his goddaughter Lola Aymerich and a niece, possibly Montserrat.

On 28 January 1939, Josep Irla, President of the Catalan Parliament, began his exile. With 62, he traveled to French territory with his wife, his daughter (Concepción Pijoan), his brother Francis and his sister in law Maria Duran, his nieces and the wife of his brother Nicholas. All their property in Sant Feliu de Guixols were confiscated by the fascist authorities. He lived for a time in Le Boulou (Roussillon) and later settled in Ceret (Vallespir), where he sought his livelihood dedicated to what he did best: the cork industry. In 1940, he was arrested by the Vichy French authorities and confined in Le Mans, where he could escape and return to Céret. With the execution of Lluis Companys, 15 October 1940, he refused to travel to America and became, automatically, President of the Generalitat of Catalonia according to the Interior Statute of Catalonia. He was the only modern president who would not set foot, as such, the Palace of the Generalitat. Then, he moved to Cogolin, where he resumed the manufacture of cork stoppers, an activity that provided the resources needed to survive.

== Generalitat de Catalunya in exile ==
The first years in office were marked by adversity, with many limitations for minimum performance, resulting from the Second World War, the problem of Catalan refugees and the permanent danger for those who remained in French territory, together with decreasing economic resources. Whilst in hiding, Irla maintained contacts with Catalans scattered throughout France. After the war, he established an Advisory Council of the Presidency of the Generalitat, with the intention of preparing the structures for a future Catalan government. The council included Carles Pi i Sunyer, Pompeu Fabra, Antoni Rovira i Virgili, Josep Carner, Joan Comorera, Manuel Serra i Moret and Pau Padro.

During his rule, he prepared the return of the government to Catalonia, maintained relations with the Catalans who had been living in Spain, he was concerned about the situation of the Catalan exiles outside Spain always keeping alive the democratic will of Catalonia, defending Catalan and international reporting the situation of fascist repression in Spain.

In this regard, in 1946, he directed a memorandum to the United Nations in which, after exposing the historical reality of Catalonia, denounced the actions of the caudillo Franco against autonomy, culture and economy of Catalonia, asking United Nations to condemn Francoist Spain and recognize the damage done to Catalonia. He obtained a fragile international condemnation that did not refer to the republican legality crushed by the military uprising, nor made any reference to the repression of Catalonia. However, the disagreement between the Catalans living in exile who hoped that the end of World War II meant the end of Francoist Spain, made into crisis his government in 1947 and he dissolved a year following. At that time, he said: "The work of the Government can not suffer any interruption and will continue to be exercised with the patriotic spirit of always". Since then, the institutional representation of the Generalitat was customized on its president.

== Death and legacy ==
Josep Irla died on 19 September 1958, shortly before turning 82, in Saint-Raphaël, Var (Provence). In 1981, his remains were moved to Barcelona and received solemnly by the presidents Jordi Pujol and Heribert Barrera. Being celebrated a state funeral in the town of Sant Feliu de Guixols. Josep Irla had a hard face and was not a great orator nor a charismatic character, but was a political manager and efficient, which he connected important sectors of Catalan society at the time (he won every election which he presented) and retains the continuity of the Catalan institutions at a time of great adversity. Today, the foundation that bears his name, has undertaken to honor the president and keep his ideological legacy.

== Bibliography ==
- Presidents del Parlament: "Josep Irla i Bosch (1938–1940)". parlament.cat. [Retrieved: 19 June 2010].
- Oliveira, Susanna. "El tercer president". Presència [Girona], no. 2019, 5–11 November 2010, p. 46–49.
- Masanés, Cristina. "Tomba de Josep Irla. Porteu-me allà baix". Sàpiens [Barcelona], no. 79, May 2009, p. 59. ISSN 1695-2014.
- Fundació Irla Bibliography
- Memoriaesquerra
- Família Soler – Aymerich
- Jiménez, Àngel (July–August 1997). "Exili i repressió contra els béns de la família de Josep Irla 1939-1951". Revista de Girona (in Catalan) (183): 82–87.
