= Basáñez (surname) =

Basáñez or Basanez is a surname. Notable people with the surname include:

- Brett Basanez (born 1983), American football player
- Josep Manuel Basáñez (1942–2024), Spanish politician
- Miguel Basáñez Ebergenyi, Mexican politician
- Miguel de Jesús Cházaro Basañez (1949–2023), Mexican botanist
- Sergio Basáñez (born 1970), Mexican actor
