= Eusebio Rodríguez Salas =

Eusebio Rodríguez Salas was a Spaniard known for being the Commissar-General of the police forces of Catalonia (a.k.a. PSUC Councilor for Public Order in the Generalitat) who played a central role in the ignition of the Barcelona May Days.

== Biography ==
Salas was born in Valladolid. He had been an Anarchist during the First World War. It was during this time that he lost an arm while raiding the Bank of Tarragona. As a railroad worker, he joined the Organizing Committee of the First Provincial Congress of the CNT of Tarragona (April 11–13, 1920), where he served as Secretary of the Bureau at its first meeting and spoke at the closing ceremony. He also served as Secretary of the Maritime Transport Union of the CNT in 1921, and held other CNT positions throughout the 1920s.

His politics however began to move away from Anarchism. He eventually joined Joaquín Maurín's Workers and Peasants' Bloc, serving on its central committee. He then left in 1935 to join the Socialist Union of Catalonia, which in 1936 became the Unified Socialist Party of Catalonia. Known for his fearless and outspoken persona, he rose quickly within the ranks of the PSUC and was appointed in December 1936 Commissar-General by Interior Security Minister Artemio Aiguadé to replace the less aggressive (though also anti-anarchist) Martín Rauret.

Salas was unpopular with the CNT-FAI due to his Communist leanings. During an internal government crisis in April 1937, an article in the CNT newspaper Solidaridad Obrera on the 17th stated that "[The] way to prevent the sacrifices of our comrades from being reduced to naught is... to create an army that will guarantee victory in the war and the Revolution and to remove from the public life of Catalonia, Comorera, Aiguadé, Rodríguez Salas, etc." On April 24, 1937 an attempt was made on his life, followed by the successful assassination of PSUC member and Secretary of the UGT Municipal Workers' Federation Roldán Cortada a day later. Salas condemned the assassination of Cortada and attributed it to "uncontrollables"; agent provocateurs who were hostile to the Popular Front. Salas ordered a raid in the Anarchist stronghold of the Hospitalet under the pretext that Cortada's killers may have been there.

== Telefónica Incident ==
The Telefónica building in Barcelona was a center of telecommunications. It "allowed for the monitoring of any government or army communique between Valencia and the Generalitat and the frontier." As part of the October 24, 1936 Catalan decree giving unions control of large commercial and industrial concerns seized by them during the opening days of the Spanish Civil War, the Telefónica (telephone exchange), owned by the Compañía Telefónica Nacional de España (a subsidiary of the International Telephone and Telegraph Corporation), was nominally controlled by a joint CNT-UGT committee with an additional Catalan government delegate. The Anarcho-Syndicalists, however, dominated the building's affairs. The Republican Government was concerned with the control that the Anarchists exercised over conversations. On May 2, 1937, for example, a call from Republican President Manuel Azaña to Catalan President Lluís Companys was interrupted by the Anarchist telephonist who said that the lines were being used for more important matters. Companys would later state that "all the telephone calls of the Generalitat authorities, of the President of Catalonia and of the President of the Republic were intercepted."

PSUC Secretary Joan Comorera condemned the Anarchists over this, saying that, "All the interior controls of the telephone exchange were in the service, not of the community, but of one organization, and neither President Azaña nor President Companys, nor anyone else, could speak without an indiscreet controller overhearing." In defense of the policy, Diego Abad de Santillán said it was used to be aware of any attempts by the government to conspire to "whittle away the people's rights" and for the CNT to act accordingly. It is likely that many in the Catalan Government (with the exception of CNT members) advocated action against the Anarchists, though none were aware in advance of Salas' actions. José Tarradellas, according to Azaña's memoirs, was critical of Salas' actions; calling them "hazardous" due to a lack of government resources with which to prepare for any resistance, and advocated negotiations without the sending of forces to the building.

On the afternoon of May 3, 1937 Salas, possibly acting on the orders of the Communist-supported Interior Security Minister Aiguadé, visited the building in the middle of the Plaça de Catalunya with three truckloads of Assault Guards and accompanied by the Generalitat representative on the Telefónica committee. Salas ordered the building's sentries to disarm and told the door guards that he was there to take charge of the building's affairs in the name of the Government. He then entered the Censors Department on the first floor, and at that point CNT members within the building began using a machine-gun nest to open fire on Salas' men. Salas phoned in for help, with a company of Assault Guards arriving along with FAI members Dionisio Eroles and José Asens. Eroles called on the CNT workers within the building to cease shooting and to surrender their arms. As the Anarchist workers within the building fired their guns into the air shortly before agreeing to surrender their weapons, the events in the days ahead now referred to as the Barcelona May Days had begun.

CNT councilors demanded the resignation of both Salas and Aiguadé. With this demand came additional calls for the dismissal of all PSUC members within the Catalan Cabinet, but neither Catalan Premier Tarradellas nor Home Secretary Ayguades complied. As part of the new provisional government agreed upon days later to stop the fighting in Barcelona, Salas was to remain head of the general commissariat (though Aiguadé sacked) until the arrival of Antonio Escobar, a Catalan delegate appointed by Valencia. On the Sixth, new CNT Minister of Justice Juan García Oliver noted in secret discussions via teletypewriter to Mariano Rodríguez Vázquez that "The minister of the interior has ordered the immediate dismissal of Rodríguez Salas."

== Later life ==
After the end of the Civil War, Salas fled to Mexico and in 1942 was expelled from the PSUC. He was then director of the magazine Conciencia Ferroviaria and contributed to the newspaper Fructidor, signing articles with the pseudonym of "Rafael Olmedo."
