= Josep Juan i Domènech =

Spanish politician

Minister of Supplies of Catalunya
- In office 26 September – 17 December 1936
- President: Lluis Companys
- Preceded by: Josep Calvet i Móra
- Succeeded by: Joan Comorera i Soler

Minister of Public Services of Catalunya
- In office 17 December 1936 – 3 April 1937
- President: Lluis Companys
- Preceded by: Joan Comorera i Soler
- Succeeded by: Josep Juan i Domènech

Minister of Economy, Public Services, Health and Social Assistance of Catalunya
- In office 3 April – 16 April 1937
- President: Lluis Companys
- Preceded by: Dídac Abad de Santillan, Josep Juan i Domènech, Pedro Herrera Camarero
- Succeeded by: Andreu Capdevila i Puig, Josep Juan i Domènech, Aureli Fernàndez

Minister of Public Services of Catalunya
- In office 16 April – 5 May 1937
- President: Lluis Companys
- Preceded by: Josep Juan i Domènech
- Succeeded by: Valeri Mas i Casas

Personal details
- Born: 1900 Les Corts, Barcelona, Catalunya
- Died: 1979 (aged 78–79) Barcelona, Catalunya
- Citizenship: Spain
- Party: CNT

Josep Juan i Domènech (Barcelona, 1900 – 1979) was a Catalan anarcho-syndicalist.

== Biography ==
Josep was born in Les Corts and lived in Sants. As a glazier, he joined the Confederación Nacional del Trabajo (CNT), with which he participated as a delegate of the Barcelona Glass Industry Union at the Catalonia conference held on 31 May 1931, as well as at the extraordinary congress in Madrid in July 1931, and at the Regional Plenary Session of Single Unions held in Barcelona in March 1933. He became secretary of the CNT's Regional Committee of Catalunya when the civil war began, replacing Dionís Eroles i Batlló.

With the entry of the anarchists into the Lluis Companys government during the war, he acted as Minister of the Generalitat de Catalunya: of Supplies from 26 September to 17 December 1936, of Public Services from 17 December 1936 to 3 April 1937, of Economy, Public Services, Health and Social Assistance from 3 to 16 April 1937 and again of Public Services from 16 April to 5 May 1937. In this last position he had confrontations with Joan Comorera who accused the CNT of the situation of subsistence in Barcelona. He left the government with the expulsion of the CNT following the Barcelona May Days and resumed his duties as secretary of the CNT's Regional Committee (July 1937 – 1939). In April 1938 he unsuccessfully proposed the independence of Catalunya if nationalist troops reached the Mediterranean and signed a pact of unity with the UGT.

In 1939 he went into exile in France, where he was interned in the concentration camps at Vernet and Djelfa, which he left in 1942 after he enlisted in the British Army. He aligned himself with the "possibilist" sector of the CNT, in favor of collaborating with the governments of the Spanish Republican government in exile, and was elected General Secretary of the split CNT at the Plenary of the Libertarian Movement in December 1947. After re-entering Catalunya clandestinely in 1950 he returned to Toulouse, where he participated in the Congresses of the International Workers' Association of 1951 and 1954. After the Plenary of Clermont-Ferrand in 1960 he returned to the unified CNT, but he was later expelled in the Plenary Session of Bordeaux in 1969. He returned to Barcelona during the Spanish transition, where he died in 1979.

== See also ==
- Anarchism in Spain

== Bibliography ==
- Bonamusa, Francesc (2006). Generalitat de Catalunya. Obra de Govern 1931–1939 (vol 1) (in Catalan). Edicions de la Generalitat de Catalunya. ISBN 978-8439-373957.

Preceded by Ramón Álvarez Palomo	General Secretary of the CNT (Possibilists) 1947–1950	Succeeded by Helios Sánchez
