= Estanislau Ruiz Ponsetti =

- Born: 23 June 1889; Mahón, Menorca, Spain
- Died: 1967; Mexico
- Occupations: Industrial engineer, journalist
- Known for: PSUC leader

Estanislau Ruiz Ponsetti, or Estanislau Ruiz i Ponsetí in Catalan (23 June 1889 – 1967), was a Spanish engineer and socialist politician who became one of the leaders of the Unified Socialist Party of Catalonia (Partit Socialista Unificat de Catalunya, or PSUC). During the Spanish Civil War he was the main architect of the Soviet-style New Economy. He went into exile after the war and lived the remainder of his life in Mexico.

== Early years (1889–1936) ==
Estanislau Ruiz Ponsetti was born in Mahón, Menorca, on 23 June 1889. He studied Exact Sciences and Engineering at the University of Barcelona. He obtained a BA in 1911 and taught geometry at the University of Barcelona in 1912–14. He graduated as an industrial engineer in 1915. He co-founded the Riera i Ruiz company in 1917, and became a director. In 1920 he was one of the founders of the General Union of Technicians of Catalonia (Sindicato General de Técnicos de Cataluña), a member of the Unión General de Trabajadores (UGT). Ruiz joined the Socialist Union of Catalonia (Unió Socialista de Catalunya). He was elected as a deputy to the Parliament of Catalonia in the November 1932 elections. He was a deputy in the Parliament of Catalonia from 1932 to 1939. He taught Economics at the Ateneu Polytechnicum (1934–35) and at the Industrial School, and was director of the latter school in 1936–37.

== Spanish Civil War (1936–1939) ==
After the outbreak of the Spanish Civil War (1936–1939) Ruiz supported the formation of the PSUC in July 1936. In the government of the Generalitat de Catalunya named by President Lluís Companys on 31 July 1936 the PSUC was given three ministries. Joan Comorera was Minister of the Economy, Rafael Vidiella was Minister of Communications and Ruiz was Minister of Supplies. The new government was blocked by the anarcho-syndicalist CNT-FAI. Before it had been able to meet, a new government was formed without PSUC representation on 6 August 1936.

On 13 August 1936 Ruiz was appointed PSUC representative on the Economic Council of Catalonia. In June 1937 he became an adviser to Joan Comorera, who was again Minister of the Economy and in July 1937 he joined the PSUC Central Committee. He was one of the main architects of the New Economy. Under Ruiz some of the Spanish enterprises that had been collectivized by the workers were either taken over by the state or returned to their original owners. Speaking in September 1937 Ruiz compared the revolutionary changes in Catalonia to those in Russia in 1921. He said,

When we want to establish the initial parallel between the transformation carried out in the Union of Soviet Socialist Republics and the transformation carried out in our own land, we can say that the beginning of the transformation was about the same; the first steps were quite similar. There the evolution has been long and painful and has presented great difficulties at certain times. In our country we have tried to carry out the same transformation in the most rapid way possible. It would be senseless not to try to profit by the experience of others. ... And so since our Russian comrades, after long years of war communism followed by misery and hunger, finally arrived at the N.E.P. [New Economic Policy] ... here we have tried to avoid that painful experience ... and leap in a single jump ... to our own period of the New Economic Policy ... of socialized property side by side with private property.

Ruiz was under secretary of the economy in the Generalitat from August 1937 until 1939. He was chairman of the board of the Industrial and Commercial Credit Fund. In 1937 he became director of the School of Labor in Barcelona.

== Later career (1939–1967) ==
Ruiz went into exile after the defeat of the Republican side in the civil war. He reached Mexico in November 1939. In 1940 he founded the ATLANT publishing house, which published the PSUC official journal Catalunya. From 1940 to 1965 he worked for the UTEHA publishing house. Ruiz was dismissed from the Central Committee of the PSUC in 1943. In 1954 he was elected second vice-president of the Parliament in exile. He died in Mexico in 1967.

== Publications ==
- L´aplicació del decret de col·lectivitzacions i control obrer (1937)
- Les empreses collectivizades i el nou ordre econòmic (1937)

== Sources ==
- Bolloten, Burnett (2015-12-01), The Spanish Civil War: Revolution and Counterrevolution, University of North Carolina Press, ISBN 978-1-4696-2447-1
- CMC (2015). "Estanislau Ruiz i Ponsetí". Gran enciclopèdia catalana (in Catalan). Enciclopèdia Catalana, SAU.
- Pagès i Blanch, Pelai (2013-10-10). War and Revolution in Catalonia, 1936-1939. BRILL. ISBN 978-90-04-25427-5.
- Payne, Stanley G. (2008-10-01), The Spanish Civil War, the Soviet Union, and Communism, Yale University Press, ISBN 978-0-300-13078-2
- Peirats, José (2011-08-01), The CNT in the Spanish Revolution, PM Press, ISBN 978-1-60486-597-4
- "Ruiz Ponseti, Estanislao". Diccionario Biográfico (in Spanish). Fundación Pablo Iglesias.
