= Agave arcedianoensis =

Conservation status
- Vulnerable (IUCN 3.1)

Scientific classification
- Kingdom: Plantae
- Clade: Tracheophytes
- Clade: Angiosperms
- Clade: Monocots
- Order: Asparagales
- Family: Asparagaceae
- Subfamily: Agavoideae
- Genus: Agave
- Species: A. arcedianoensis

Binomial name
- Agave arcedianoensis Cházaro, O.M.Valencia & A.Vázquez

Species of plant

Agave arcedianoensis is a species of Agave which grows in the Mexican state of Jalisco. This species is also known by the common name Maguey de Arcediano.
