= Rafael Vidiella =

Spanish trade unionist and politician (1890–1982)

Rafael Vidiella Franch
- Born: 1890; Tortosa, Spain
- Died: 23 September 1982 (aged 91–92); Barcelona, Spain
- Occupations: Typographer, politician

Rafael Vidiella Franch (1890 – 23 September 1982), was a trade unionist and Communist politician from Catalonia. He served as a minister in the government of Catalonia during the Spanish Civil War (1936–1939).

== Early years (1890–1936) ==
Rafael Vidiella Franch was born in Tortosa in 1890. He became a typographer, and as a young man joined the anarchist Confederación Nacional de Trabajadores (CNT, National Confederation of Workers). During the dictatorship of Miguel Primo de Rivera from 1923 to 1930 he edited the newspaper Solidaridad Obrera (Worker's Solidarity) in Valencia. In 1925 Vidiella represented the CNT in the communist-anarchist-Esquerra discussions. He left the CNT and became an activist in the socialist Unión General de Trabajadores (UGT, General Workers' Union).

From 1931 Vidiella was head of the Catalan Federation of the Partido Socialista Obrero Español (PSOE, Spanish Socialist Workers' Party). Efforts to merge the small left-wing parties of Catalonia began in March 1935. The Bloque Obrero y Campesino and the Izquierda Comunista merged in October 1935 to form the Partido Obrero de Unificación Marxista (POUM, Workers' Party of Marxist Unification). The Unió Socialista de Catalunya was linked to the Esquerra Catala led by Lluís Companys, and were reluctant to join.

Negotiations over forming a unified party dragged out before the start of the civil war. The Catalan Communist Federation wanted the new party to join the Communist International, while Vidiella as leader of the Catalan federation of the PSOE wanted the new party to join the Labour and Socialist International. Joan Comorera of the Unió Socialista did not want the new party to be affiliated with any international group. Eventually, however, Comorera and Vidiella agreed that the new party could adhere to the Comintern, and it was launched. In May 1936 Vidiella resigned from the PSOE national committee. After a few months Comorera and Vidiella became members of the Partido Comunista Español (PCE, Spanish Communist Party) central committee. At first the Partit Socialista Unificat de Catalunya (PSUC, Unified Socialist Party of Catalonia) had between 2,000 and 5,000 members, but by March 1937 it may have had 50,000.

== Spanish Civil War (1936–1939) ==
On 21 July 1936 the Generalitat passed a decree recognizing the Central Committee of Anti-fascist Militias of Catalonia. Vidiella and Fernández were given charge of the Investigation Commission.

In the government of the Catalan Generalitat named by President Lluís Companys on 31 July 1936, the PSUC was given three ministries. Joan Comorera was Minister of the Economy, Rafael Vidiella was Minister of Communications and Estanislau Ruiz Ponsetti was Minister of Supplies. The government wanted to avoid trials of people charged with murder during the revolutionary period that followed the defeat of the 18 July 1936 military uprising in Catalonia. Vidiella prepared a press release which said the Council of the Generalitat had unanimously accepted his proposal to order the courts not to treat "revolutionary events" as crimes. Companys said it should not be published, but Vidiella went ahead anyway and the report appeared in the newspapers. There was no public denial. The dominant CNT-FAI objected to the inclusion of the PSUC, and on 6 August 1936 a new government was formed that excluded the PSUC.

On 17 December 1936 a new "syndical" government of Catalonia took office. Three members of the PSUC represented the UGT in this government: Vidiella (Justice), Comorera (Provisions), and Miquel Valdés (Labor and Public Works). On 16 April 1937 there was a cabinet reshuffle and Vidiella became Minister of Labor and Public Works. On 25 April 1937 Roldán Cortada, a PSUC leader, was murdered. Vidiella accused the anarchists of responsibility, and this led to the May Days clashes between the Stalinists and anarchists in the first week of May 1937.

On 5 May 1937 the government resigned. Antonio Sesé, the PSUC secretary, was killed shortly after being appointed to the new Executive Council of the Generalidad. Vidiella was appointed Minister of Public Order, Justice and Labor in his place. On 28 June 1937 Companys formed a new government in which Vidiella was Minister of Labor and Public Works. He would hold this post for the remainder of the civil war. On 7 September 1937 Vidiella said "the judges cannot consider accusations having to do with the revolutionary events provoked by the rebellious generals, since to do so would be to prosecute the revolution itself."

== Later career (1939–1982) ==
After the civil war Vidiella lived in exile in several countries before settling in Budapest. During the struggle between Joan Comorera and the leadership of the Partido Comunista de España (PCE, Spanish Communist Party) he sided with the latter. For several years he was one of the leaders of the PCE. He contributed to the magazine Nous Horitzons founded in 1960. In 1976 he returned to Spain and settled in Barcelona, where he died on 23 September 1982.

== Sources ==
- Alexander, Robert J. (1999). The Anarchists in the Spanish Civil War. Janus Publishing Company Lim. ISBN 978-1-85756-412-9.
- Graham, Helen (2002-12-19). The Spanish Republic at War 1936-1939. Cambridge University Press. p. 262. ISBN 978-0-521-45932-7.
- Jackson, Gabriel (2010). Juan Negrín: Physiologist, Socialist and Spanish Republican War Leader. Sussex Academic Press. ISBN 978-1-84519-376-8.
- Martínez de Sas, María Teresa (2000). Diccionari biogràfic del moviment obrer als Països Catalans (in Catalan). L'Abadia de Montserrat. ISBN 978-84-8415-243-9.
- Pagès i Blanch, Pelai (2013-10-10). War and Revolution in Catalonia, 1936-1939. BRILL. ISBN 978-90-04-25427-5.
- "Rafael Vidiella, fundador del PSUC". El País. 1982-09-25.
- Thomas, Hugh (2013-11-06). The Spanish Civil War: Revised Edition. Random House Publishing Group. ISBN 978-0-8041-5216-7.
