= Joan P. Fàbregas =

Spanish politician and trade unionist (1893–1966)

Minister of Economy of Catalonia
- In office 26 September – 17 December 1936
- President: Lluís Companys
- Prime Minister: Josep Tarradellas
- Preceded by: Josep Tarradellas
- Succeeded by: Diego Abad de Santillán

Personal details
- Born: Joan Pau Fàbregas Llauró; 1893 Sant Martí de Provençals, Barcelona, Catalonia, Spain
- Died: 1966 (aged 72–73) London, United Kingdom
- Party: Regionalist League of Catalonia (before 1931); Republican Left of Catalonia (1931–1936)
- Other political affiliations: National Confederation of Labour (1936–1937)
- Occupation: Economist, teacher

Joan Pau Fàbregas Llauró (1893–1966), also known as Joan Porqueras Fàbregas, (Note: His name is commonly abbreviated to Joan P. Fàbregas.) was a Catalan economist and politician who served as Minister of Economy of Catalonia. Although from a Catalan nationalist background, following the Spanish Revolution of 1936, Fàbregas joined the anarchist National Confederation of Labour (CNT) and offered his expertise in the reorganisation of the economy of Revolutionary Catalonia. He joined the Economic Council of Catalonia and, as Minister of Economy, drafted a Collectivisation Decree that legalised the collective ownership of enterprises. He fled Spain following the May Days and went into exile in London, where he spent the rest of his life.

== Biography ==
=== Early life and career ===
Fàbregas was born in Sant Martí de Provençals, a neighbourhood in the north of Barcelona, in 1893. He was the son of a bartender and himself went on to become a bookkeeper. Fàbregas was wounded during the Tragic Week and forced to flee the political repression that followed, escaping to Argentina. After he returned to Catalonia, he worked a number of jobs, before settling into work as a banker. Fàbregas worked at a bank in Reus, where he became friends with the anarchist activist Joan Montseny. Fàbregas himself was affiliated with the Catalan nationalists and was a member of the Regionalist League of Catalonia (LRC).

During the 1931 Spanish local elections, Fàbregas ran as a candidate for the Republican Left of Catalonia (ERC). After the proclamation of the Second Spanish Republic, Fàbregas became the director of the Centre Internacional d'Intercanvi, a company which carried out market research. He travelled throughout Europe to learn about different countries' economies, including those in the British Isles, the Baltics and the Balkans. In 1932, he compiled his thoughts into books about the economic possibilities of an independent Catalonia. He also directed the Ateneu Enciclopèdic Popular, a working class social centre where he gave courses on political economy, and the Catalan Institute of Economic Sciences.

Following the outbreak of the Spanish Civil War in July 1936, Fàbregas joined the liberal professionals' union of the National Confederation of Labour (CNT), an anarchist trade union centre. As the old order collapsed during the Spanish Revolution of 1936, Fàbregas offered his economic and financial expertise to the CNT, which became the predominant force in Revolutionary Catalonia, and defended their economic plans against both Stalinists and Catalan nationalists. Before the Revolution, Fàbregas was almost entirely unknown by militants of the CNT.

In August 1936, Fàbregas joined the Economic Council of Catalonia, which had been established by the Catalan government to oversee the reorganisation of the Catalan economy, as a representative of the CNT. Together with Andreu Nin, he outlined a plan for the socialisation of the Catalan economy. In September 1936, Fàbregas accompanied CNT general secretary Mariano R. Vázquez to Madrid, where they attempted to request funds from the Spanish government for the redevelopment of Catalan industry. They asked for 800 million pesetas in credit to support the Catalan economy, as well as 30 million pesetas to acquire war materiel and 150 million francs to acquire raw materials, but the Spanish government denied each of their requests. In a report to a regional plenum of the CNT, on 24 September, Fàbregas stated that he did not know why their requests had been denied, as he believed "the financial conditions of Spain are the best in the world".

=== Minister of Economy ===
On 26 September 1936, Fàbregas was appointed as the Minister of Economy of the Catalan government. Capdevila represented Fàbregas on the Economic Council as delegate-president. From this ministerial post, Fàbregas drafted the Catalan government's Collectivisation Decree, which legalised the industrial collectives that had been established by the anarchists during the revolution. He proposed the collectivisation decree as a "neutral ground", which all tendencies on the Economic Council could agree on. Following tense negotiations over the decree, during which Fàbregas threatened his predecessor Josep Tarradellas with a pistol, it was finally passed on 26 October 1936.

During his time as Economy Minister, Fàbregas approved 25 decrees and 86 public orders which regulated the revolutionary Catalan economy. In November 1936, he voiced his opposition to the entry of the CNT into the Spanish government, despite his support for their participation in the Catalan government. By December 1936, he was facing increased scrutiny for his background in right-wing politics. In mid-December 1936, divisions between the Unified Socialist Party of Catalonia (PSUC) and the Workers' Party of Marxist Unification (POUM) came to a head, threatening to bring down the Catalan government. Fàbregas considered it essential for the CNT to continue collaborating with the government, so sought to stay out of any internal conflicts between other factions. Fàbregas ultimately served in this post for 80 days. On 17 December, he was replaced as Minister of Economy by Diego Abad de Santillán, who opposed the Collectivisation Decree, believing it deprived workers of their independent initiative. The economy ministry would remain under the control of the CNT until June 1937.

=== Later activities ===
He subsequently returned to his work in the CNT liberal professionals' union and later joined the committee of the New Unified School Council (CENU), serving alongside Joan Puig i Elias. After the exit of the CNT from the Catalan government in the spring of 1937, Fàbregas represented the liberal professionals' union at a plenary of the Catalan CNT-FAI, where he helped to draft a proposal for the CNT's reintegration into the government. In April 1937, Fàbregas called for the establishment of a national economic council to coordinate the Spanish economy. He also wrote a series of books, analysing his time as Minister of Economy and the actions he took during that period.

In the wake of the May Days, Fàbregas fled into exile in London. He left politics and ceased his activism with the CNT. He spent much of the rest of his life worried that Stalinists were planning to kill him. In the British capital, he returned to his career in business and occasionally published articles on economics in Catalan journals. He worked for the BBC and founded an export company. He died in London in 1966, and his body was buried in Barcelona.

== Selected works ==
- Irlanda i Catalunya. Paral·lelisme polític-econòmic (Barcelona, 1932)
- Les possibilitats econòmiques d'una Catalunya independent (Barcelona, 1932)
- Assaig d'Economia Política (Barcelona, 1932-1934)
- La crisis mundial y sus repercusiones en España (Barcelona, 1933)
- Els Factors econòmics de la revolució (Barcelona, 1937)
- Vuitanta dies al govern de la Generalitat (1937)
- Les finances de la revolució (1937)

== Bibliography ==
- Alexander, Robert J. (1999). The Anarchists in the Spanish Civil War. London: Janus Publishing Company. ISBN 978-1-85756-400-6.
- Bolloten, Burnett (1991). The Spanish Civil War: Revolution and Counterrevolution. University of North Carolina Press. ISBN 978-0-8078-1906-7.
- Casanova, Julián (2005). Preston, Paul (ed.). Anarchism, the Republic and Civil War in Spain: 1931–1939. Translated by Dowling, Andrew; Pollok, Graham. Routledge. ISBN 0-415-32095-X.
- Fraser, Ronald (1979). Blood of Spain: The Experience of Civil War, 1936-1939. Penguin Books. ISBN 0-7139-1085-2.
- Íñiguez, Miguel (2001). "Fábregas Llauró, Juan P.". Esbozo de una enciclopedia histórica del anarquismo español (in Spanish). Madrid: Fundación de Estudios Libertarios Anselmo Lorenzo. p. 210. ISBN 9788486864453. OCLC 807322760.
- Pagès i Blanch, Pelai (2013) [2007]. War and Revolution in Catalonia, 1936–1939. Translated by Gallagher, Patrick. Brill. ISBN 978-90-04-25426-8.
- Peirats, Josep (1998) [1990]. Anarchists in the Spanish Revolution. London: Freedom Press. ISBN 0-900384-53-0. OCLC 634571715.
- Richards, Vernon (2019) [1953]. Lessons of the Spanish Revolution. PM Press. ISBN 978-1-62963-647-4. LCCN 2018949093.
- Roca Rosell, Francesc (2022). "Joan Porqueras Fàbregas". Historia Hispánica (in Spanish). Royal Academy of History.
- "Joan Porqueras i Fàbregas". Gran Enciclopèdia Catalana (in Catalan).
