= Miguel de Jesús Cházaro Basañez =

Mexican botanist (1949–2023)

Miguel de Jesús Cházaro Basañez (15 August 1949 – 4 April 2023) was a Mexican botanist known for his work on succulent plants. Over the course of his career he described or co-described 21 plant species. He contributed directly or indirectly to increasing the number of species of cacti discovered in Mexico by one-third. The standard author abbreviation Cházaro is used to indicate this person as the author when citing a botanical name.

Miguel de J. Cházaro Basáñez . Photo credits: John Pint

== Early life and education ==
Cházaro was born on 15 August 1949, in Xalapa, Veracruz, Mexico. He received a bachelor's degree from the Universidad Veracruzana-Xalapa where he studied under Arturo Gómez-Pompa. From 1972 to 1973, he worked as a botanical collector for the Flora of Veracruz project, which studies the plants found in the state of Veracruz. He then worked at the Mexican Coffee Institute. There he studied parasitic and epiphytic plants in the coffee farming ecosystem and nectar-producing plants in coffee plantations in Coatepec, Veracruz.

When noted botanist Hugh H. Iltis visited Veracruz, Cházaro was appointed as his field guide. Iltis was impressed with his knowledge of plants, with Cházaro identifying all the plants that Iltis pointed at, by scientific name. From this interaction, he received a scholarship to study at the University of Wisconsin Madison, where he worked under Iltis. He received a master's degree in Botany. His thesis was titled Miscellaneous Papers on the Flora of Veracruz, Mexico.

== Career ==
In 1986, Cházaro returned to Jalisco and served as director of the Herbarium at the Institute of Botany of the University of Guadalajara (UdeG). He studied the agaves of western Mexico influenced by the work of Howard S. Gentry who wrote Agaves of Continental North America. In 1989, he began studying parasitic plants in Mexico. He found the rare parasitic species Dendrophthora costaricensis in Mexico for the first time. During his time at the UdeG, he taught undergraduate and extracurricular courses at both the University Center for Biological and Agricultural Sciences (CUCBA) and the University Center for Social Sciences and Humanities (CUCSH), where he founded the biogeography laboratory. He conducted fieldwork alongside fellow botanists including Rogers McVaugh and Michael Nee.

In 2006, he earned his PhD in biology from UdeG. His dissertation was titled The Parasitic Plants of Mexico: Floristics and Phytogeography. During his time at the university, he increased the number of described species of agave from 11 to 28. After 25 years, he retired and moved back to his hometown of Xalapa. In 2012, he began teaching at the Universidad Veracruzana where he trained botanists.

=== Works ===
Over the course of his career, Cházaro published 14 books and 10 book chapters, and published over 120 articles journals in six languages. His books include: Vegetation: Environment Series in Coatzacoalcos Mistletoes of the State of Tlaxcala, Mexico, Botanical Anthology of the State of Jalisco, Mexico, Flora of Pico de Tancítaro National Park, Michoacán, Botanical Anthology of Western Mexico, Flora of Northern Jalisco and Huichol Ethnobotany, Agaves of Western Mexico, Management for the Sustainability of the Piedras Bola Natural Area, Ahualulco de Mercado, Jalisco, Trees of the Santiago River Canyon, Environmental and Cultural Synthesis of Zapotlán Lagoon, and the Botanical Guide to Cofre de Perote National Park. Two books are planned to be published after his death: Agaves and Mezcals of Jalisco and The Green Nuances: Flora of the Xalapa Region.

Cházaro served on the editorial eoard of botanical journals Boletín Nakari, Flora de Veracruz, and Bouteloua. He was a member of the Latin American and Caribbean Cactus Society, the International Organization for Succulent Plants, and the Cacti and Other Succulents Specialist Group of the International Union for Conservation of Nature (IUCN).

Cházaro discovered and described, as the author or co-author, 21 species: Agave wendti, Agave valenciana, Agave vazquezgarciae, Agave arcedianoensis, Agave microceps, Agave gomezpompae, Agave jimenoi, Agave kristenii, Agave temacapulinensis, Agave maria-patriciae, Agave sororum, Aphyllon castilloi, Castilleja eggeri, Chusquea perotensis, Echeveria uxorum, Echeveria yalmanantlanensis, Eugenia naraveana, Graptopetalum mendozae, Graptopetalum glassii, Pachyphytum machucae, and Pachyphytum contrerasii. Due to the small salary he lived on and limited funding for expeditions, he made all his discoveries without owning a car himself.

A great contribution brought to the discovery and description of new Agave species. Thus, just while he worked at CUCBA, "He increased the number of described agave species from 11 to 28, making him one of the primary contributors to the taxonomic knowledge of this group of plants."

== Awards and honors ==
In 2014, Cházaro received the Ometochtli Medal, which is awarded to individuals who have made important contributions to agave culture.

Eight species of plants native to Mexico have been named after Cházaro: Ageratina chazaroana, Gentiana chazaroi, Echeveria chazaroi, Phoradendron chazaroi, Salvia chazaroana, Agave chazaroi, Sedum chazaroi, and Peperomia chazaroi.

== Personal life ==
Cházaro was married to María Patricia Hernández-Romero. Together they had three children. His wife and children would often came with him on his botanical collecting trips. He named Agave maria-patriciae after his wife.

Miguel de J. Cházaro Basáñez.

Photo credits: John Pint

Cházaro died on 4 April 2023, at his home in Veracruz while reading a book on plants. On the day he died, El Charco del Ingenio Botanical Garden in San Miguel de Allende shared online a photo taken that day of the species Agave chazaroi, which was in bloom.
