= Manuel Serra Moret =

Spanish politician (1884–1963)

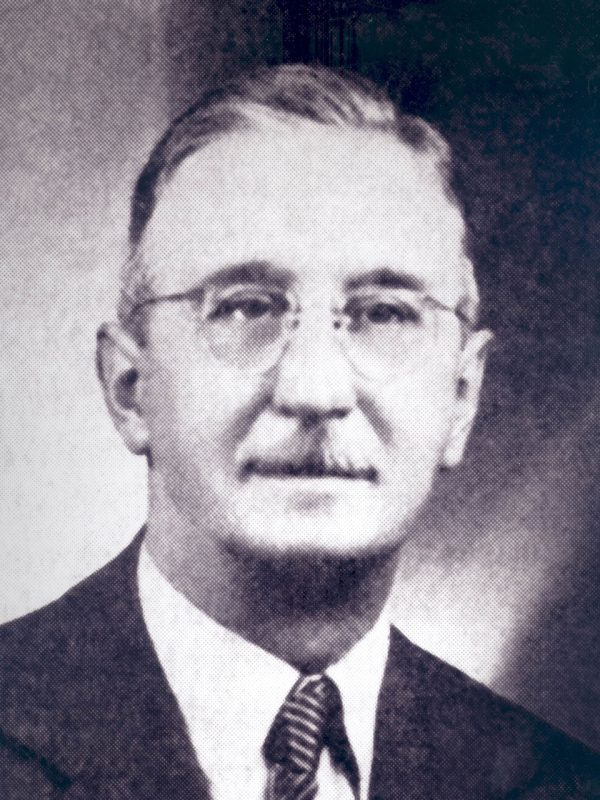

5th President of the Catalan Parliament
- In office 5 December 1949 – 7 August 1954
- Preceded by: Antoni Rovira i Virgili
- Succeeded by: Francesc Farreres i Duran

Minister of Economy and Labour with Francesc Macià
- In office 28 August 1931 – 3 October 1932

Minister of Economy with Francesc Macià
- In office 3 October 1932 – 19 December 1932

Personal details
- Born: 9 May 1884 Vic, Catalonia
- Died: 29 July 1963 (aged 79) Perpignan, France
- Party: Socialist Union of Catalonia, Unified Socialist Party of Catalonia
- Occupation: Politician; Journalist; Economist

Manuel Serra Moret (9 May 1884 – 29 July 1963) was a Catalan politician and writer, cofounder of the political party Unió Socialista de Catalunya, USC (Socialist Union of Catalonia), Conseller of Economy and Labour of the Generalitat de Catalunya and exiled President of the Parliament of Catalonia.

== Biography ==
Born in Vic, the son of the historian Josep Serra Campdelacreu, he studied economy, sociology and history in the United States and England. He married Sara Llorens Carreras in 1908. He lived in Argentina between 1907 and 1909 and during the Spanish dictatorships of Primo de Rivera (1925–1926) and Francisco Franco (1939–1948). He died 1963 in the French city of Perpignan still in exile.

== Political trajectory ==
In 1914 he was elected mayor of the town of Pineda de Mar, a position he held until 1923. He first was a member of the party Unió Catalanista and since 1916 of the Catalan Federation of the Spanish Socialist Workers' Party. In 1923 he abandoned this party to found the USC with Rafael Campalans amongst others.

On 28 April 1931 he was chosen as Minister of Economy and Labour for the provisional government of the Generalitat of Catalonia presided by Francesc Macià. Later in the same year (28 June) he was elected as a deputy to the Spanish Constituent Assembly which later drafted the Spanish Constitution of 1931. In the elections to the Parliament of Catalonia, held on 20 November 1931, he was the candidate with the higher number of votes (78,814) of all Catalonia, even more than those obtained by Lluis Companys who became President of the Generalitat of Catalonia in 1933. On 14 November 1933 he was also elected as a member of the Spanish Republican Parliament.

In the last session of the Parliament of Catalonia (1 October 1938) before its dissolution after the Spanish Republic losing the Spanish Civil War, he was elected second vice-president of the Parliament. This meant that when in 1949 the president of the Catalan Parliament (Antoni Rovira Virgili) died, he became acting president, a position held until 1954. This very same year as the President of the Generalitat of Catalonia stepped down of his post due to his advanced age he should have been nominated President of the Generalitat. Nevertheless, Francesc Farreres i Duran became the next president in an election performed by the exiled members of the Catalan Parliament in Mexico.

In recognition to his political and human trajectory the re-established Generalitat of Catalonia created in 1982 an award for research works on public spirit named after him, Premi Serra i Moret per a obres i treballs sobre civisme.

== Exile ==
From 1939 until his death in 1963 he lived in exile. After a few days' walk he crossed the French border on 31 January 1939. During the first days he stayed in Perpignan, a little city close to border but soon moved to England where he had contacts with members of the Labour Party. Nevertheless, being unable to find a job and with the menace of the outbreak of the Second World War he flew to Argentina where his wife Sara lived. Manuel Serra and his family did not move to Europe until 1948, settling in Perpignan from where they never moved again.

Serra Moret committed the years in exile to writing and politics, and wrote his most influential political essays and economical studies during those years. He became a reference of socialism and catalanism for the Catalans in exile and for those in Catalonia.

== Publications ==
Throughout his life Manuel Serra Moret published hundreds of articles in political and economical journals. He was also known for his abilities as an orator and many of his conferences were later transcribed and published.

Some of his more influential works are

- 1912: La socialització de la terra
- 1934: Socialisme
- 1944: Reflexions sobre el demà de Catalunya (edited in exile)
- 1957: Crida a la joventut catalana (edited in París)
- 1957: Ciutadania catalana. Breviari de cogitacions, remarques i orientacions per als catalans (edited in Buenos Aires)

He also wrote economics books, amongst which:

- 1942: La reconstrucción económica de España. Ensayo especulativo sobre un futuro posible (edited in Buenos Aires)
- 1944: Diccionario económico de nuestro tiempo. Científico – teórico – estadístico – comercial – jurídico – sociolóico (edited in Buenos Aires)
- 1944: Geografía económica (edited in Buenos Aires)
