= Josep Tarradellas =

Spanish politician

The Most Illustrious The Marquess of Tarradellas
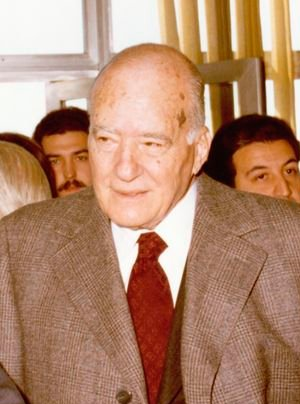
- Tarradellas in 1979

125th President of the Government of Catalonia
- In office 7 August 1954 – 8 May 1980 (In exile from 7 August 1954 to 17 October 1977)
- Monarch: Juan Carlos I
- Preceded by: Josep Irla
- Succeeded by: Jordi Pujol

Minister of Governance of the Government of Catalonia Minister of Governance and Health (14 December 1932 – 24 January 1933)
- In office 29 December 1931 – 24 January 1933

First Minister of the Government of Catalonia Prime Minister and Minister of Finance (26 September 1936 – 3 April 1937) and (16 April 1937 – 5 May 1937) Prime Minister and Minister of Finance and Culture (3 April 1937 – 16 April 1937)
- In office 26 September 1936 – 5 May 1937

Minister of Economy and Public Services of the Government of Catalonia
- In office 6 August 1936 – 26 September 1936

Personal details
- Born: 19 February 1899 Cervelló, Catalonia, Spain
- Died: 10 June 1988 (aged 89) Barcelona, Catalonia, Spain
- Party: ERC
- Spouse: Antònia Macià i Gómez (1904–2001)

Josep Tarradellas i Joan, 1st Marquess of Tarradellas (Catalan pronunciation: [ʒuˈzɛp tərəˈðeʎəs]; 19 February 1899 – 10 June 1988) was a Catalan politician from Spain known for his role as the first president of the Government of Catalonia (Generalitat de Catalunya), after its re-establishment in 1977 under the new Spanish Constitution and the end of the Francoist Dictatorship. He was appointed the role of 125th President of Catalonia in 1954 but spent 23 years in exile until 1977 when he was officially recognised as the President of Catalonia by the Spanish Government.

== Biography ==
In 1931, Tarradellas became general secretary of the Republican Left of Catalonia (ERC). He also was deputy at the Cortes that year, Governance and Health councillor when Francesc Macià was President of the Generalitat of Catalonia as well as Public Services, Economy and Culture councillor during the Spanish Civil War.

Exiled to France since 1939, he became President of the Generalitat of Catalonia when Josep Irla resigned, in 1954.

On 23 October 1977, two years after Francisco Franco's death, the President of the Spanish Government Adolfo Suárez met him to negotiate the reestablishment of the Government of Catalonia, an event which occurred. The sentence pronounced at his arrival has become famous as a symbol: "Ciutadans de Catalunya, ja sóc aquí!" (Catalan for "Citizens of Catalonia, I am here at last!").

He was welcomed solemnly in Barcelona and set up a unity government. He finished his work with the elections for the Catalan Parliament (March 1980), and Jordi Pujol was elected in April.

On 24 July 1986 Tarradellas received the hereditary title marqués de Tarradellas (English: Marquess of Tarradellas) from King Juan Carlos I. Tarradellas died in Barcelona in 1988. The hereditary marquessate is now held by his son, who became the second marquess.

On 21 December 2018 the Government of Spain announced that Barcelona–El Prat Airport would be renamed after Tarradellas.

Political offices
Preceded by Josep Irla; In exile	President of the Government of Catalonia; In exile from August 7, 1954 to October 17, 1977; 1954–1980	Succeeded by Jordi Pujol
Preceded by Joan Casanovas i Maristany	Minister of Governance of the Government of Catalonia; 1931–1932	Succeeded by Himself, as Minister of Governance and Health
Preceded by Himself, as Minister of Governance, Antoni Xirau i Palau as Minister of Health and Social Assistance	Minister of Governance and Health of the Government of Catalonia; 1932–1933	Succeeded by Joan Selves i Carner as Minister of Governance, Josep Dencàs i Puigdollers as Minister of Health and Social Assistance
Preceded by New title	Minister of Public Services of the Government of Catalonia; 1936	Succeeded by Himself as Minister of Economy and Public Services
Preceded by Joan Comorera i Soler as Minister of Economy, himself as Minister of Public Services	Minister of Economy and Public Services of the Government of Catalonia; 1936	Succeeded by Joan Porqueras i Fàbregas as Minister of Economy, Joan Comorera i Soler as Minister of Public Services
Preceded by Joan Casanovas i Maristany as First Minister, Martí Esteve i Guau as Minister of Finance	First Minister and Minister of Finance of the Government of Catalonia (1st time); 1936–1937	Succeeded by Hismself as First Minister and Minister of Finance and Culture
Preceded by Himself as First Minister and Minister of Finance, Antoni Maria Sbert i Massanet as Minister of Culture	First Minister and Minister of Finance and Culture of the Government of Catalonia; 1937	Succeeded by Himself as First Minister and Minister of Finance, Antoni Maria Sbert i Massanet as Minister of Culture
Preceded by Himself as First Minister and Minister of Finance and Culture	First Minister and Minister of Finance of the Government of Catalonia (2nd time); 1937	Succeeded by Carles Martí i Feced as Minister of Governance, Finance and Culture
Preceded by Carles Martí i Feced as Minister of Governance, Finance and Culture	Minister of Finance of the Government of Catalonia; 1937–1939	Succeeded by Joan Josep Folchi i Bonafonte as Minister of Economy and Finance, In 1977
Party political offices
Preceded by Joan Lluís Pujol i Font	General Secretary of ERC; 1931–1932	Succeeded by Joan Tauler i Palomeras
Preceded by Joan Tauler i Palomeras	General Secretary of ERC; 1938–1957	Succeeded by Joan Sauret i Garcia
Spanish nobility
New creation	Marquess of Tarradellas; 1986–1988	Succeeded by Josep Tarradellas i Macià
