= Reyero =

- Municipality
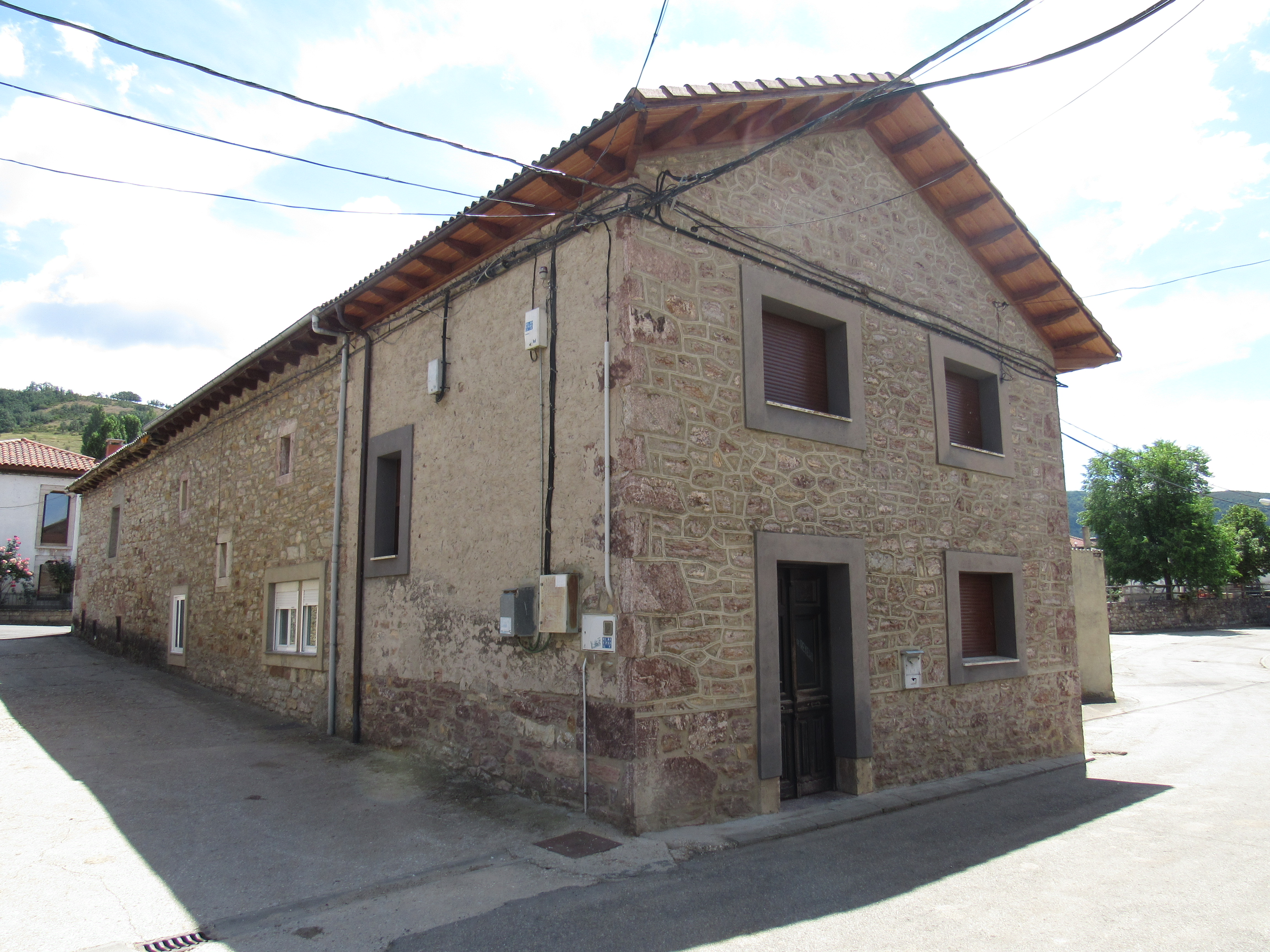
- Town hall

- Location Reyero (Castile and León) Reyero (Province of León)
- Coordinates: 42.948984°N 5.198818°W
- Country: Spain
- Autonomous community: Castile and León
- Province: León
- Comarca: Valle de Boñar

Government
  - Alcalde: Gregorio Alonso González (PSOE)

Area
  - Total: 26.2 km^{2} (10.1 sq mi)
- Elevation: 1,150 m (3,770 ft)

Population (2025-01-01)
  - Total: 120
  - Density: 4.6/km^{2} (12/sq mi)
- Time zone: UTC+1 (CET)
  - Summer (DST): UTC+2 (CEST)

Reyero is a municipality located in the province of León, Castile and León, Spain. According to the 2004 census (INE), the municipality has a population of 146 inhabitants.
