= Mariano R. Vázquez =

Spanish trade unionist (1909–1939)

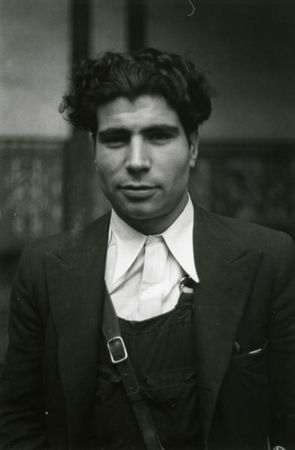
- Vázquez in 1936

General Secretary of the Confederación Nacional del Trabajo
- In office 18 November 1936 – 10 February 1939
- Preceded by: Horacio Prieto
- Succeeded by: Esteve Pallarols (in Spain); Germinal Esgleas (in exile)

Personal details
- Born: Mariano Rodríguez Vázquez; 1909 Barcelona, Catalonia, Spain
- Died: 18 June 1939 (aged 29–30) La Ferté-sous-Jouarre, Seine-et-Marne, France
- Citizenship: Spanish
- Party: Iberian Anarchist Federation
- Profession: Bricklayer
- Nickname: Marianet

Military service
- Allegiance: Spanish Republic
- Battles/wars: Spanish Civil War: July 1936 military uprising in Barcelona; May Days; Catalonia Offensive

Mariano Rodríguez Vázquez (Note: Also known by the Catalan: Marià Rodríguez i Vázquez.) (1909 – 18 June 1939), popularly known by his nickname Marianet, (Note: The diminutive form of "Mariano" in the Catalan language.) was a Spanish anarcho-syndicalist politician who served as General Secretary of the Confederación Nacional del Trabajo (CNT) during the Spanish Civil War.

Born into a working-class Calé family in Barcelona, his mother died while he was young and his father subsequently abandoned him. He spent his teenage years in poverty and was often imprisoned. There, he first found connection with the Spanish anarchist movement and learnt to read and write. After his release, he joined the construction union of the CNT and began writing for its newspaper Solidaridad Obrera, where he debated anarchist feminism with Lucía Sánchez Saornil. Sánchez Saornil's criticisms of Vázquez's views on gender equality led her to establish the Mujeres Libres organisation.

Following the outbreak of the Spanish Civil War, Vázquez was elected the CNT's general secretary, becoming a leading advocate for anarchist collaboration with the Republican government. After the May Days, his support for collaboration and military discipline drew criticism from parts of the anarchist movement, which condemned his continued loyalty to the government of Juan Negrín. After the victory of the Nationalist forces, Vázquez fled to France, where he organised aid for Spanish refugees and the transfer of the CNT's archives to the International Institute of Social History. He also had a heated exchange with Emma Goldman, who, after supporting him during the war, questioned whether he had been "duped" by Negrín and the Communist Party of Spain, whom anarchists blamed for the Republican defeat. Vázquez held that the defeat was from insufficient support from Western democracies, and that the CNT had been premature in pursuing revolution before winning the war.

Vázquez drowned in the Marne river in June 1939. His memory soon became a target for anarchist critics of collaborationism, who held him personally responsible for the revolution's collapse. Allegations of moral and political corruption were made against him, sometimes infused with anti-Romani sentiment. In the 21st century, he has been cited as a notable example of Romani participation in the leadership of the Spanish anarchist movement.

== Biography ==
=== Early life and activism ===
Mariano Rodríguez Vázquez was born in 1909 in Barcelona to a working class Calé family. Vázquez grew up in the neighbourhood of Hostafrancs, in Barcelona's Sants-Montjuïc district. His mother died while he was a child, and his father abandoned him to a children's shelter, which was well known for abusing children. When he was a teenager, he escaped the institution. Without a family or a job throughout the 1920s, he faced difficulties with poverty and was frequently imprisoned. In prison, he met members of the Spanish anarchist movement, who became his chosen family and taught him how to read and write. He subsequently dropped his patrilineal surname "Rodríguez" and began signing his name using only his matrilineal surname "Vázquez".

Following the proclamation of the Second Spanish Republic, Vázquez was released from prison into a new political environment. He found work as a bricklayer and joined the construction union of the Confederación Nacional del Trabajo (CNT), an anarcho-syndicalist trade union confederation. He also joined the Iberian Anarchist Federation (FAI), where he became popularly known by the nickname "Marianet". During the Republican years, he was frequently detained for his anarchist activism and served six prison sentences, totalling 29 months. On one occasion, in September 1931, he was arrested during a confrontation between his union and the police. He was imprisoned for a year and three months, which he spent studying anarchist theory and writing articles for the CNT's newspaper Solidaridad Obrera. After his release, he returned to political activism and quickly rose through the ranks of the CNT.

He became a frequent contributor to the anarchist press, in which he advocated for the establishment of a women's platform within the anarchist movement. In 1935, he published two articles on the subject in Solidaridad Obrera, demonstrating sympathy for the problems anarchist women faced within the movement and declaring that they were effectively "slaves of slaves" so long as the oppression of women persisted. He called for anarchist women to unite with their male counterparts to create a new society, where everyone has economic independence, which he believed would bring an end to gender inequality. This led to a public debate with the anarchist feminist Lucía Sánchez Saornil, who responded that male anarcho-syndicalists were largely disinterested in encouraging women's participation in the movement and proposed that women needed to be treated as equals by men if they were to be recruited into the movement. She also rejected Vázquez's plan to devote a page of Solidaridad Obrera to women's issues, as she had ambitions to create a separate journal for anarchist women. Saornil's plans culminated with her establishing the anarchist women's organisation Mujeres Libres.

=== Rise to the CNT leadership ===
By the outbreak of the Spanish Civil War in July 1936, Vázquez had become secretary of the CNT's regional committee in Catalonia. During the July 1936 military uprising in Barcelona, he and other members of the CNT leadership stormed the Atarazanas barracks, seizing weapons to fight the Nationalists. The Nationalists were beaten in Catalonia, which became a centre for a social revolution that saw the widespread collectivisation of property by the anarcho-syndicalists. Vázquez, with Buenaventura Durruti and Joan Garcia i Oliver, met the Catalan president Lluis Companys, who appeared to have accepted the anarchist control over Barcelona. Vázquez then oversaw the formation of an anti-fascist alliance with the government of Catalonia, arguing for the necessity of anarcho-syndicalists fighting alongside the Popular Front against the Nationalists. Within weeks, the Catalan government – composed of the Republican Left of Catalonia (ERC) and Unified Socialist Party of Catalonia (PSUC) – attempted to sideline the newly-established Central Committee of Antifascist Militias of Catalonia (CCMA) and bring the Civil Guard into Barcelona. But Vázquez, along with Durruti and Garcia i Oliver, launched an armed defence of anarchist control of the capital, demanding the government's immediate dissolution. To appease the anarchists and avoid armed confrontation, the Catalan prime minister Joan Casanovas excluded the PSUC from his administration, first seeking the approval of Vázquez before publicly announcing the move. By September 1936, Vázquez had overseen the integration of several members of the CNT into the Catalan government, taking three ministries and other posts associated with defence and public order.

Vázquez became a leading advocate of anarchist collaboration with the governments of Catalonia and the Spanish Republic. He moved to Madrid, and oversaw the integration of anarchists into the Republican government. He initially opposed immediate integration into the government, aiming to secure proportional representation for the CNT in a government presided over by the trade union leader Francisco Largo Caballero. Vázquez secured four ministries for the CNT in the new government and convinced the intransigent Joan Garcia i Oliver to take a ministerial post. He then moved to Valencia, where the government had sought refuge from the Nationalist's siege of Madrid. The government's move to Valencia provoked discontent from the CNT's membership, many of whom accused the government and their own general secretary, Horacio Prieto, of "cowardice". Prieto responded on 18 November 1936, by tendering his "irrevocable resignation". In his place, Vázquez was elected as the General Secretary of the CNT. In his first address to the CNT, on 20 November, Vázquez appealed for "individual and collective discipline" in the face of the circumstances that drove them to collaboration with the government. He quickly appointed Jacinto Toryho as editor-in-chief of Solidaridad Obrera, replacing Liberto Callejas, who had a more lax editorial line, and charged Toryho with adapting the newspaper to the strict discipline he saw as necessary. When Toryho was criticised by Callejas and Jaume Balius, who accused him of expelling "true anarchists" from the paper and replacing them with "suspect journalists", Vázquez publicly defended him as having worked in service of the CNT's political line.

Throughout the war, Vázquez concerned himself with the activities of the Durruti Column, engaged in diplomacy with Mexico and international volunteers, and publicised the deaths of anarchists fighting on the frontlines. When Málaga fell in early 1937, Vázquez called for each party on the Republican side to examine their own responsibility in the defeat. In April 1937, when the militarisation of the CNT militias was decreed, he defended the policy in an interview with the anti-statist magazine Nosotros, which had opposed calls for militarisation. He promised that the militarisation would not be an authoritarian implementation, and that anarchists would maintain control of their own units, although they would be integrated into a coordinated and unified force, under strict military discipline. Vázquez believed that organisational discipline within the anarchist movement was the best way that they could counter the "tidal wave of confusion" caused by the rise of the Communist Party of Spain (PCE). To impose the military discipline of the frontline onto the anarchist rearguard, he reorganised the CNT's syndicates into sections that could better support the war effort. He also announced military recruitment drives, holding particular contempt for the "señoritos" (young bourgeois men) that spent their time relaxing in cafés rather than fighting on the frontline.

=== Conflict and mediation ===
In the early months of the war, both the anarchists and the government of Largo Caballero had wanted equitable collaboration, with anarchist leaders such as Vázquez, Federica Montseny and Joan Peiró giving a speech on the matter in Valencia on International Workers' Day. However, civil conflict between the anarchists and communists had come to a head in early 1937, as the latter faction (which opposed anarchist collectivisation policies) increasingly attacked the former. In April, Vázquez publicly denounced the communists for killing anarcho-syndicalists in Toledo. During the May Days, when fighting between the two factions broke out over control of Barcelona, Vázquez went to the city to mediate a ceasefire. He and Montseny secured an armistice, in exchange for the dismissal of the Catalan communist police chief Eusebio Rodríguez Salas. Vázquez believed that the communists had sought to provoke the anarchists into open conflict. Diego Abad de Santillán expressed regret to Vázquez over their response to the provocation, saying that the CNT leadership had made an error "in bringing an end to the firing without having resolved the pending problems."

In the wake of the conflict, Vázquez reiterated his support for the government, calling for it to be reorganised on the basis of a CNT-UGT coalition with Largo Caballero continuing as its president. But Largo Caballero failed to form a new cabinet and was subsequently replaced by the communist-backed Juan Negrín. Negrín quickly ousted the CNT from his cabinet and rejected Vázquez's appeals for its reincorporation. On 29 May, Vázquez issued a report that rejected further collaboration with the "government of the counterrevolution" and called for the formation of an opposition coalition with the UGT. But this was widely seen by his opponents as a bluff, as within days of the report's publication, Vázquez was meeting with Negrín in an attempt "to discuss conditions for possible collaboration". The following month, Vázquez called for the creation of a government with proportional representation for all organisations on the Republican side, but the government had no intention of readmitting the anarchists into their ranks. Juan Manuel Molina Mateo reported that, during this period, Vázquez spent his meetings with Negrín "discussing trivialities" and appeared ignorant to the "gigantic operation under way to end once and for all the influence of the CNT." After the fall of Euskadi in June 1937, Vázquez wrote to President Manuel Azaña, demanding the re-entry of the CNT into government and a reform of the Republican war effort.

In this time, the Negrín government had also intensified its repression against the POUM and its leader Andreu Nin was forcibly disappeared. Although he considered the affair to be a symptom of intra-Marxist conflict between the Stalinists and Trotskyists, rather than part of an attack by the Stalinists against all their political opponents, Vázquez publicly protested against the political repression of the POUM. He stated that the repression of the POUM had started the Republicans down a "dangerous course", which would lead to the political repression of anyone demonstrating opposition to the government. He expressed worry that he may be at risk of arrest, imprisonment and execution.

=== Campaign for reintegration ===
Despite the repressions, Vázquez continued to support the Negrín government. This made him a focus of criticism from other anarchists, who accused Vázquez of "revisionism" and a "betrayal of anarchist principles". Vázquez was most vocally criticised by the Friends of Durruti Group, led by Jaume Balius, who had taken up a personal vendetta against him. He was also criticised by the Ramón Liarte and Josep Peirats, the leaders of the Anarchist Youth of Catalonia. When the anarchist government ministers Federica Montseny and Joan Garcia i Oliver were criticised by anarchists from other countries in June 1937, Vázquez hit back, calling for the international anarchist movement to support them. He also denounced his critics, accusing them of "playing into the hands of the enemy", and regretted that the international anarchist movement had not been more supportive of Spanish anti-fascists. He reserved praise for Helmut Rüdiger, who he described as the only member of the IWA that had a "real critical spirit".

In July 1937, when the government legalised anarchist agricultural collectives and offered them financial credit in return for recognition of the government, Vázquez encouraged them to accept. In August, when anarchists protested against the establishment of the Servicio de Información Militar (SIM), the Republic's secret police service, the CNT's leadership supported it, with Vázquez recommending that Negrín appoint Garcia i Oliver as its leader. Addressing the 1937 Paris Congress of the International Workers' Association (IWA), Vázquez downplayed reports of repression by the Republican government against the anarchists and stated that the CNT was still growing and united in purpose in spite of the repression against it. He stated that CNT's primary concern was to win the war and declared that, once they had done so, the CNT would resume its revolution and bring Spain under anarcho-syndicalist control.

Vázquez also wrote to Emma Goldman, requesting that she defend the CNT's continued collaboration with the Republican government at a meeting of the IWA. Although Goldman had been privately sympathetic to anarchist criticisms of collaboration and militarisation, she publicly defended the policy as the best of many bad options, urging European and American anarchists to tone down their criticisms of the CNT leadership. Nevertheless, in January 1938, Vázquez and the FAI's leader Pedro Herrera wrote to Goldman requesting that she tone down her criticisms of the PCE and the Republican government, worrying that such criticisms would make the international labour movement indifferent towards the Spanish anti-fascists.

As the Nationalists began to advance against the Republicans, Vázquez continued campaigning for the anarchists to be reincorporated into the government. This process culminated in March 1938, when the CNT and the UGT made an agreement for the CNT to rejoin the government. The pact was largely welcomed by the anarchist rank-and-file, who were exhausted with the factional dispute. Although a vocal minority still opposed it, Vázquez retorted that he was "indifferent" to them and praised UGT secretary José Rodríguez Vega as "a symbol of the unity of the Spanish working class."

By this time, the Nationalists' Aragon Offensive had been successful and the Republican government considered the option of surrender. This move was met with a furious response from the workers of Barcelona, where Vázquez backed a communist-led demonstration that demanded the Republicans not surrender and called for the removal of Defence Minister Indalecio Prieto. Although Vázquez convinced many anarcho-syndicalists to participate in the demonstration, there was already a division within the anarchist movement over the issue of continued resistance. Vázquez argued for the necessity of "all-out resistance", while the FAI's central committee called for opposition to the Republican "counterrevolution" and considered the possibility of an armistice with the Nationalists. Not long after the demonstrations, Vázquez again reiterated his calls for representatives of the CNT be brought into the government. But he shocked some of his colleagues in the CNT leadership when he also proposed that the overall composition of the government remain unchanged, in effect proposing that Prieto be allowed to remain in the defence ministry.

=== Debates on continued collaboration ===
In April 1938, Negrín finally agreed to bring a member of the CNT into his cabinet, but was only prepared to give it one ministry and wanted to choose the minister. He had initially only offered token representation to the CNT, without any ministerial positions, but this was rejected by Vázquez. Vázquez and Horacio Prieto put together a list of three CNT members for their prospective ministry, from which Negrín chose Segundo Blanco as his minister of education and health. Meanwhile, Vázquez and Prieto joined the national committee of the Popular Front, which acted as a "sub-government" to Negrín's council of ministers. The move was met with skepticism from many in the anarchist movement, who questioned whether they would have any meaningful power.

Vázquez praised the formation of the new government, which he thought would inspired Spanish anti-fascists to win the war. In an address the CNT's local unions, he promised that repression against anarchists would halt and that the CNT would regain its positions; he called for anarchists to maintain discipline and accept government mandates in order to advance the war effort; and he justified the CNT only holding one government ministry as a means to appease western democracies so they would allow war material over the border. This move came amidst heightening discontent from the radical elements of the anarchist movement, including from Jacinto Toryho, who Vázquez swiftly ousted as editor of Solidaridad Obrera, bringing the paper in line with his policy of "unqualified governmental collaboration". When the Negrín government published its political program, the anarchist movement became increasingly worried about the apparent counter-revolutionary aspirations of the Republican state. Vázquez and Prieto attempted to calm the rising anxieties of the anarchist movement by providing a positive spin to the programme's points, defending it as necessary to solicit support from Western democracies, although this support would ultimately never arrive.

By October 1938, the Spanish anarchist movement was on the verge of splitting over continued collaboration with the Republican government. At the movement's National Plenary in Barcelona, Vázquez took the side of the "collaborationists". He defended anti-fascist unity, which he considered a necessity against the now-overwhelming military force of the Nationalists. He believed that the prolonging the war could result in it merging with a coming Europe-wide war, which would force the Western democracies to intervene against the Nationalists. He was opposed by the "abstentionists", now led by Pedro Herrera and the FAI, who called for a return to anti-statist principles and accused Vázquez of opportunism and of abandoning anarchist principles.

Although she privately aligned with the FAI, Goldman publicly refused to speak out against the CNT, fearing a Republican defeat. She attempted to appeal to Vázquez for clemency for imprisoned members of the POUM, but he declined to pursue the issue due to the pressing Nationalist advance. Before the end of the year, Goldman's office in London was closed by the CNT-FAI. Meanwhile, the Mujeres Libres were experiencing severe financial difficulties, but had received little-to-no support from the official anarchist organisations. When Emma Goldman appealed to Vázquez for aid, he responded defensively, rejecting that the CNT hadn't done enough for the women's organisation, while pointing out that the anarchist movement did not have the resources that the communists had.

=== Exile and death ===
In February 1939, as the Nationalists' Catalonia Offensive advanced, Vázquez instructed anarchists to evacuate Spain, and he fled into exile in France. In Paris, he oversaw the reorganisation of the Spanish anarchist movement in exile, becoming general secretary of the Spanish Libertarian Movement (MLE). From this position, Vázquez organised the provision of aid to other refugees that had fled Spain, encouraging Spanish anarchists to emigrate to Mexico, where they were hosted by the sympathetic government of Lázaro Cárdenas. He also personally ensured the removal of the Spanish anarchist movement's archives from Spain to the International Institute of Social History in Amsterdam.

In his personal analysis of the Republican defeat, Vázquez continued to emphasise a lack of discipline as a motivating factor. He blamed both the CNT's attempts at socialisation and the Marxists' intentions to Bolshevise the country, which the Spanish government had been unable to hide in its propaganda directed towards the Western democracies. He entered into a bitter exchange of angry letters with Emma Goldman, who accused him of having been "duped" by Negrín and the communists into "giv[ing] up the defence of Barcelona". Vázquez retorted that no betrayal had taken place, stating his belief that the lack of Western support that had been the cause for the Republican defeat. He argued that the Spanish Revolution had frightened off western powers from supporting the Republic, and that it had therefore been a mistake.

Despite their argument, for Goldman's 70th birthday in June 1939, Vázquez sent her his appreciation for her sustained understanding and aid in their struggle. He dubbed Goldman as the "spiritual mother" of the Spanish anarchist movement, in a tribute that Goldman described as the most beautiful she had ever received. That same night, Vázquez was found dead in La Ferté-sous-Jouarre, having drowned in the Marne river. Some of his friends considered his death to be suspicious.

== Legacy ==
In a September 1938 lecture, Vázquez reflected on how the Spanish anarchist movement of the 1930s would be understood in history. He hoped to be remembered as a principled anti-fascist, who treated fascism as the "number-one enemy" of the time period, contrasting himself with "purists" who preferred idealistic sacrifices to necessary compromise. To historian Burnett Bolloten, Vázquez's leadership during the Civil War was characterised by "waverings and inconsistencies", which he contrasted with the unchanging party line of the Communist Party.

After his death, critics of anarchist collaboration with the Republican government began to hold Vázquez personally responsible for the collapse of the Spanish Revolution. Anarchist historian Josep Peirats attacked Vázquez for having "clung like a leech to Negrín's gang"; and Juan Gómez Casas wrote that collaboration "had a devastating effect upon him" and described how much he had changed since his time as secretary of the CNT's construction union. But Bolloten rejected the characterisation of Vázquez as a conscious servant of Negrín and the communists, noting a post-war report by the Italian communist Palmiro Togliatti that said the party had "no possibility of directly influencing the Anarchist unions from the inside", as Vazquez had consistently refused to link the CNT with the PCE.

Vázquez was posthumously accused by critics, including Joan Garcia i Oliver, of various personal, moral and political infractions, most of which were unsubstantiated rumours and some of which were driven by anti-Romani sentiment. Although Vázquez never publicly referenced his identity as a Romani person, it was frequently highlighted and stereotyped by his opponents to discredit him. In his book El eco de los pasos, Garcia i Oliver depicted Vázquez as having "intellectual limitations" and accused him of being either a puppet of the Soviets or other members of the anarchist leadership. Garcia denounced the "unmistakably Gypsy" Vázquez as untrustworthy and claimed that any changes in the CNT during the war were due to "Gypsy chicanery".

In contrast, while anarchist activist Federica Montseny agreed that the CNT's collaboration with Negrín had led to a "disaster", she also defended Vázquez's position of prolonging the war until the outbreak of World War II as having been vindicated by the pace of history. On the 20th anniversary of his death, Montseny published a biography of Vázquez in the CNT's journal Cénit. Although she expressed her admiration for him, describing him as very friendly and attractive, her description also contained anti-Romani sentiments, depicting him as an unintelligent, infantile and inexperienced man of "insufficient culture".

Despite the abundant availability of documents and material on his life, as of 2022, Vázquez has not been the subject of a complete biography. Vázquez, along with Helios Gómez, has been cited by Spanish historians María Sierra and Juan Profundo as a notable example of Romani participation in the Spanish anarchist movement. Sierra and Profundo contrasted the anti-Romani stereotypes of "laziness, ignorance and dishonesty", which were levelled against him by his opponents, with his "effectiveness as the head of the CNT".

== Selected works ==
- "Mujer: Factor revolucionario" (Solidaridad Obrera, 18 September 1935)
- "Avance: Por la elevación de la mujer" (Solidaridad Obrera, 10 October 1935)
- "Army Organization" (Spanish Revolution, 9 April 1937)

== Bibliography ==
- Ackelsberg, Martha A. (2005) [1991]. Free Women of Spain: Anarchism and the Struggle for the Emancipation of Women. Oakland, California: AK Press. ISBN 1-902593-96-0. LCCN 2003113040. OCLC 63382446.
- Alexander, Robert J. (1999). The Anarchists in the Spanish Civil War. London: Janus Publishing Company. ISBN 1-85756-412-X.
- Bolloten, Burnet (1991). The Spanish Civil War: Revolution and Counterrevolution. University of North Carolina Press. ISBN 0-8078-1906-9. LCCN 89-77911.
- Brown, Henry (2024). "The Anarchist in Uniform: The Militarisation of Anarchist Culture during the Spanish Civil War (1936–1939)". Contemporary European History. 33 (1): 305–322. doi:10.1017/S0960777322000285.
- Cañete Quesada, Carmen (2020). "The memory of Spanish Gypsies: Scholarship, oral history, and archive research". Romani Studies. 30 (1): 15–47. doi:10.3828/rs.2020.2. ISSN 1528-0748.
- Casanova, Julian (2004) [1997]. Anarchism, the Republic and Civil War in Spain: 1931–1939. Routledge. ISBN 0-203-02280-7.
- Romero Salvadó, Francisco J. (2013). "Rodríguez Vázquez, Mariano". Historical Dictionary of the Spanish Civil War. Scarecrow Press. p. 285. ISBN 978-0-8108-8009-2.
- Ruiz, Julius (2009). "'Work and Don't Lose Hope': Republican Forced Labour Camps during the Spanish Civil War" (PDF). Contemporary European History. 18 (4): 419–441. doi:10.1017/S0960777309990087.
- Sierra, María; Pro, Juan (October 2022). "Gypsy Anarchism: Navigating Ethnic and Political Identities". European History Quarterly. 52 (4): 593–612. doi:10.1177/02656914221097011. hdl:10261/280207. ISSN 0265-6914.
- Wexler, Alice (1989). "Spain and the World". Emma Goldman in Exile: From the Russian Revolution to the Spanish Civil War. Boston: Beacon Press. pp. 196–233. ISBN 0-8070-7004-1. LCCN 88-43317.
