= Diego Abad de Santillán =

Spanish anarchist, author, economist (1897–1983)

- Santillán in 1971

Minister of Economy of Catalonia
- In office 17 December 1936 – 3 April 1937
- President: Lluís Companys
- Preceded by: Joan Porqueras i Fàbregas
- Succeeded by: Josep Juan i Domènech

Personal details
- Born: Sinesio Baudillo García Fernández; 20 May 1897 Reyero, León, Spain
- Died: 18 October 1983 (aged 86) Barcelona, Catalonia, Spain
- Party: Iberian Anarchist Federation
- Education: University of Madrid
- Occupation: Economist; Historian

Sinesio Baudillo García Fernández (20 May 1897 – 18 October 1983), commonly known by his pseudonym Diego Abad de Santillán, was a Spanish Argentine anarcho-syndicalist economist. Born in León, his family moved to Argentina while he was young. He returned to Spain for his higher education and became involved in the Spanish anarchist movement. After his studies, he went back to Argentina and became involved with the Argentine Regional Workers' Federation (FORA), co-founding the International Workers' Association (IWA). Following the 1930 Argentine coup d'état and the establishment of the Second Spanish Republic, he again went to Spain, becoming involved in the Iberian Anarchist Federation (FAI). During the Spanish Civil War, he served in the Catalan government as Minister of Economy. After the war, he returned to Argentina and largely ceased political activities, going back to Spain only after the Spanish transition to democracy.

== Biography ==
In 1897, Santillán was born Sinesio Baudillo García Fernández in Reyero, a small, isolated town in the region of León. His father was from a Leonese family of blacksmiths and his mother was from an Andalucian family of miners. In 1905, the family moved to Argentina, settling in Santa Fe.

After working a number of jobs, in 1913, the young Sinesio returned to León and earned his bachelor's degree at a local university. After some travels around Catalonia and the Basque Country, in 1915, he enrolled at the University of Madrid, where he studied the humanities, graduating as a Doctor of Philosophy. In the Spanish capital, he began to live a bohemian lifestyle, taking the pseudonym Diego Abad de Santillán while writing for dissident journals.

Santillán participated in the 1917 Spanish general strike, for which he was imprisoned for a year. After receiving an amnesty, he returned to Argentina, briefly reuniting with his family in Santa Fe before moving to the capital Buenos Aires. There he joined the Argentine Regional Workers' Federation (FORA), working as editor of its newspaper La Protesta. In 1922, he went to Germany and participated in the establishment of the International Workers' Association (IWA), staying behind in Berlin in order to study medicine. There he met a number of famous anarchists, including Max Nettlau, for whom he helped translate his works into Spanish. In 1925, he briefly went to Mexico and helped organise the General Confederation of Workers (CGT) before returning to Argentina, where he took part in the Sacco & Vanzetti defense campaign and wrote a history of anarchism in Argentina. In the wake of the 1930 Argentine coup d'état, he was sentenced to death for sedition, but managed to escape into exile in the newly established Spanish Republic.

In Spain, Santillán joined the Confederación Nacional del Trabajo (CNT) and became secretary of the Iberian Anarchist Federation (FAI), for which he edited their respective newspapers Solidaridad Obrera and Tierra y Libertad. Following the outbreak of the Spanish Civil War, he joined the Central Committee of Antifascist Militias of Catalonia and was appointed Minister of Economy in the Catalan government. In the wake of the May Days, he took a critical line against the government of Juan Negrín and the Communist Party of Spain (PCE), publishing After the Revolution, which outlined a program for workers' self-management under anarcho-syndicalism. In the program, Santillán invoked British utilitarian philosopher John Stuart Mill in his attacks against capitalism, declaring:

Stuart Mill is right. We believe that such a society has no right to existence and we desire its total transformation. We want a socialized economy in which the land, the factories, the homes, the means of transport cease to be the monopoly of private ownership and become the collective property of the entire community.

When the Republic was defeated, Santillán fled into exile in France, before finally returning to Argentina. There he continued his historical work and contributed to dictionaries and encyclopedias, notably writing Why We Lost the War, which his son Luis later adapted into film. He largely ceased political activities and gravitated increasingly towards reformism, defending anarchist collaboration with the Republican government during the war, while also coming to prioritise the abolition of the state over the abolition of capitalism.

During the Spanish transition to democracy, Santillán finally returned to Spain, settling in Barcelona, where he died in 1983.

== Selected works ==
- After the Revolution: Economic Reconstruction in Spain (1937)
- Why We Lost the War: A Contribution to the History of the Spanish Tragedy (1940)

== See also ==
- Anarchist economics
- Gaston Leval
- Matteotti Battalion

== Bibliography ==
- Casanova, Julián (2004). "Diego Abad de Santillán: memoria y propaganda anarquista". Historia Social (in Spanish) (48): 129–147. ISSN 0214-2570. JSTOR 40340897.
- Christl, Robert (April 2023). "Anarchism in One Country: Diego Abad de Santillán and the Invention of Participatory National Economic Planning in Interwar Anarchism". Journal of the History of Ideas. 84 (2). University of Pennsylvania Press: 313–336. doi:10.1353/jhi.2023.0014. ISSN 1086-3222. PMID 38588262. S2CID 258056754.
- Lee, Andrew H. (2009). "Abad de Santillán, Diego (1897–1983)". In Ness, Immanuel (ed.). The International Encyclopedia of Revolution and Protest. pp. 1–2. doi:10.1002/9781405198073.wbierp1656. ISBN 9781405198073.
- Spannos, Chris (2012). "Examining the History of Anarchist Economics to See the Future". In Shannon, Deric; Nocella II, Anthony; Asimakopoulos, John (eds.). The Accumulation of Freedom. Edinburgh: AK Press. pp. 42–63. ISBN 978-1-84935-094-5. LCCN 2011936250.
- Tavera García, Susanna (2000). "Abad de Santillán, Diego»". In Martínez de Sas, María Teresa (ed.). Diccionari biogràfic del moviment obrer als països catalans (in Catalan). L'Abadia de Montserrat. pp. 26–27. ISBN 84-8415-243-X.
