= Josep Manuel Basáñez =

Spanish politician (1942–2024)

Member of the Parliament of Catalonia for Barcelona
- In office 16 June 1988 – 20 July 1989
- Succeeded by: Ramon Coma i Casellas

Minister of Economy and Finance of Catalonia
- In office 23 April 1987 – 4 July 1988
- Preceded by: Josep Maria Cullell i Nadal
- Succeeded by: Ramon Trias Fargas

Personal details
- Born: Josep Manuel Basáñez i Villaluenga; 6 July 1942 Burgos, Spain
- Died: 10 August 2024 (aged 82)
- Party: CDC
- Education: ETSEIB
- Occupation: Businessman

Josep Manuel Basáñez i Villaluenga (6 July 1942 – 10 August 2024) was a Spanish politician. A member of the Democratic Convergence of Catalonia, he served in the Parliament of Catalonia from 1988 to 1989 and was Minister of Economy and Finance of Catalonia from 1987 to 1988.

Basáñez died on 10 August 2024, at the age of 82.
