= Socialist Union of Catalonia =

Socialist Union of Catalonia Unió Socialista de Catalunya
- Leader: Rafael Campalans, Joan Comorera, Manuel Serra i Moret
- Founded: 1923
- Dissolved: 23 July 1936
- Split from: PSOE
- Merged into: PSUC
- Ideology: Socialism; Catalan nationalism Republicanism

Socialist Union of Catalonia (in Catalan: Unió Socialista de Catalunya) was the socialist political party in Catalonia, Spain. USC was formed through a split in Spanish Socialist Workers' Party in 1923. The main leader of USC was Joan Comorera.

USC led the Unió General de Sindicats Obrers de Catalunya (UGSOC).

During the Spanish Republic, the USC was allied with the main Catalan party, ERC (Republican Left of Catalonia) in every election. In 1936 USC merged with other forces to form the Unified Socialist Party of Catalonia. At that time USC had around 5000 members.
