= Joan Comorera =

Spanish politician and journalist

Joan Comorera i Soler
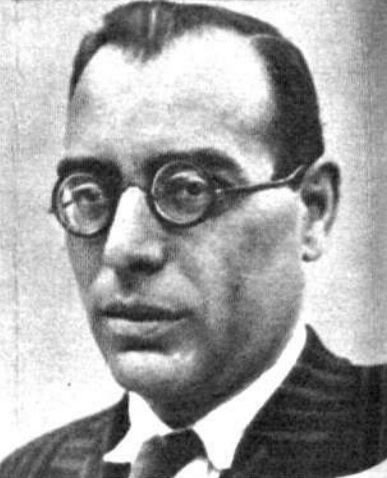
- Born: 5 September 1894; Cervera, Catalonia, Spain
- Died: 7 May 1958 (aged 63); Burgos, Spain

Joan Comorera i Soler (or Juan Comorera y Soler; 5 September 1894 – 7 May 1958) was a Spanish Communist politician, journalist and writer from Catalonia who spent several years in Argentina before returning to Spain in 1931 at the start of the Second Spanish Republic. He was a Catalan nationalist, and was elected chairman of the Socialist Union of Catalonia in 1933. In 1936 he became Secretary General of the Unified Socialist Party of Catalonia (PSUC), in alliance with the Spanish Communist Party. During the Spanish Civil War (1936–1939) he built up his party into a major political force during the struggles among the supporters of the Republic between Socialists, Stalinists, Trotskyists and Anarcho-syndicalists. After the Republicans were defeated by the right-wing forces led by Francisco Franco he went into exile, living in Mexico and then in France. In 1949 he was expelled from the Communist party for his Catalan nationalism, and survived an assassination attempt. In 1951 he moved back to Catalonia using a false name. He was arrested in 1954 and died in prison four years later.

== Early years: 1895–1930 ==
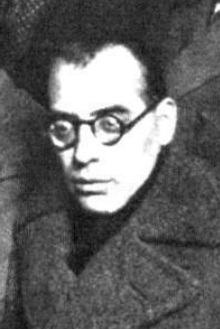
1930s

Joan Comorera i Soler was born in Cervera, Segarra, Catalonia on 5 September 1894. He took a teacher's training course in Lérida, but never taught. In 1913 he began work as a journalist, acting as the Madrid correspondent of the newspaper La Publicidad. In the summer of 1913 he founded the anticlerical magazine La Escuela in Cervera. In 1914 he moved to Barcelona, where he became involved in the republican movement. He was a cofounder of the Bloc Republicà Autonomista (BRA), and then of the Partit Republicà Català (PRC). He was active in journalism as a regular contributor to La Lucha and editor of El Pueblo. In 1916 he married Rosa Santacana.

Comorera lived in France from 1917 to 1919. In 1919 he published La trágica ignorancia española (The Tragic Ignorance of Spain). He emigrated to Argentina in 1919, where he continued to work as a journalist. He joined the Argentine Socialist Party. He was naturalized and headed the bilingual weekly paper Nación Catalana (Catalan Nation) from 1923 to 1930. He was forced to leave Argentina after the coup of General José Félix Uriburu in September 1930. He moved to Uruguay that year.

== Second Republic: 1931–1936 ==
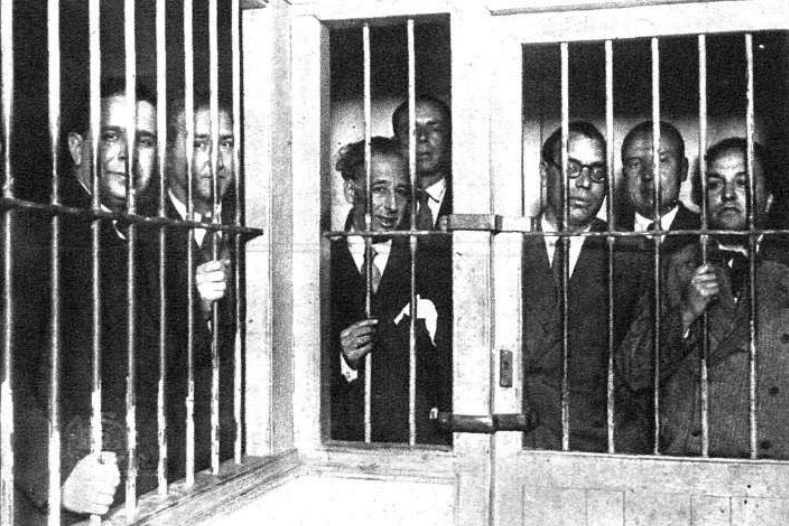
prisoner, with Companys

With the proclamation of the Second Spanish Republic in 1931 Comorera returned to Catalonia, where he joined the Socialist Union of Catalonia (Unió Socialista de Catalunya, USC). He headed the socialist weekly Justicia Social (Social Justice) from 1931 to 1936. Comorera was elected to the Parliament of Catalonia in November 1932, and was elected chairman of the executive committee of the USC in April 1933. He was Minister of Agriculture and Economy in the first government of Catalonia formed by president Lluís Companys, from January to October 1934. He organized the Higher Council of Cooperation and the Agricultural and Cooperative Bank of Credit. Comorera participated in the events of 6 October 1934 and was sentenced to thirty years imprisonment.

A meeting of the six Marxist parties of Catalonia was held on 3 February 1935 to prepare for the formation of the partido socialista catalán. The meeting was attended by representatives of the Unió Socialista de Catalunya (USC), Federación Catalana del PSOE, Partit Comunista Catalá (PCC), Bloc Obrer i Camperol (BOC) and the Izquierda Comunista. Comorera's USC took the position that the Socialists should unify into one group, the Communists into another, and then the two groups should join. This was the start of extended negotiations in which a liaison committee was formed to resolve issues between the Socialist groups. The growing strength of the Trotskyist POUM (Partido Obrero de Unificación Marxista, Workers' Party of Marxist Unification) encouraged the PCC to enter into negotiations with the liaison committee. On 24 November 1935 the committee held a meeting in Barcelona which the PCC was invited to attend. Comorera wrote from prison urging a quick union of the groups, and the PCC joined the committee in the first half of January 1936.

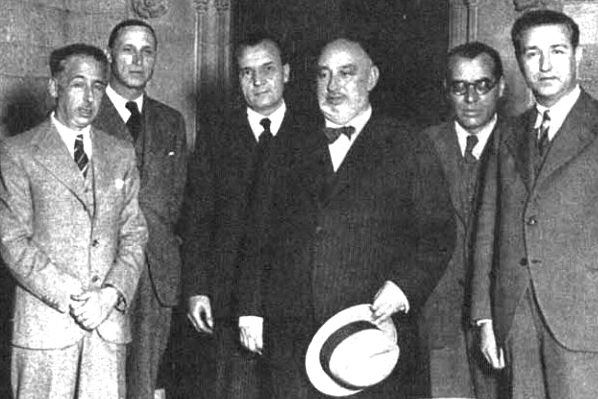
official, with Ossorio y Gallardo

When the Popular Front gained power in February 1936 Comorera was released and returned to the Ministry of Agriculture and Economy. Comorera led the USC into unification with the Proletarian Catalan Party (Partit Català Proletari) in April 1936, followed by formation in July 1936 of the Unified Socialist Party of Catalonia (Partit Socialista Unificat de Catalunya, PSUC) Comorera was appointed PSUC secretary general. In the government of the Catalan Generalitat named by President Companys on 31 July 1936 the PSUC was given three ministries. Comorera was Minister of the Economy, Rafael Vidiella was Minister of Communications and Estanislau Ruiz Ponsetti was Minister of Supplies. However, the dominant CNT-FAI objected to the inclusion of the PSUC, and on 6 August 1936 a new government of autonomous Catalonia was formed that excluded the PSUC.

== Civil War: 1936–1939 ==
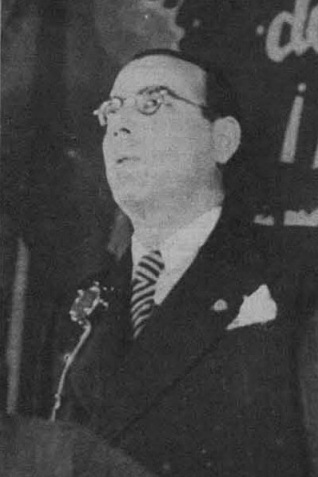
speaking at PSUC rally

During the Spanish Civil War (1936–1939) Comorera held various ministerial positions in the government of Catalonia. He was active in the movement to unify the Anarchist Confederación Nacional del Trabajo (CNT) and the PSUC, and attended plenary meetings of the Communist Party of Spain (Partido Comunista de España PCE). At the end of November 1936 the Trotskyist POUM denounced the Soviet Union for preventing them from joining the Madrid Defense Council. On 13 December 1936 Comorera said, "the POUM has initiated a shameful campaign of attacks and slanders against the great proletarian country and friend, using exactly the same arguments as the fascist Germans and Italians." The CNT chose to ignore the dispute between the POUM and the PSUC, arguing in favor of the unity government. However, a new "syndical" government was formed on 17 December 1936 that excluded POUM members and included Comorera, Rafael Vidiella and Miquel Valdés of the PSUC.

Comorera was Minister of Supplies in the "syndical" government, and was soon accused of causing the shortage of bread in Barcelona. In turn, the PSUC accused the CNT's supplies committees of causing the problem. On 22 February 1937 CNT unions confiscated 15,000 sacks of flour from a Barcelona warehouse. On 27 February Comorera introduced bread rationing throughout Catalonia. The cabinet was reshuffled frequently. On 3 April 1937 Comorera became Minister of Labor, and on 16 April became Minister of Justice. An article in the CNT newspaper Solidaridad Obrera on 17 April 1937 stated that "[The] way to prevent the sacrifices of our comrades from being reduced to naught is... to create an army that will guarantee victory in the war and the Revolution and to remove Comorera, Aiguadé, (Note: Artemio Aiguadé was the Interior Security Minister of Catalonia.) Rodríguez Salas, (Note: Eusebio Rodríguez Salas was Commissar-General of the police forces of Catalonia.) etc. from the public life of Catalonia."

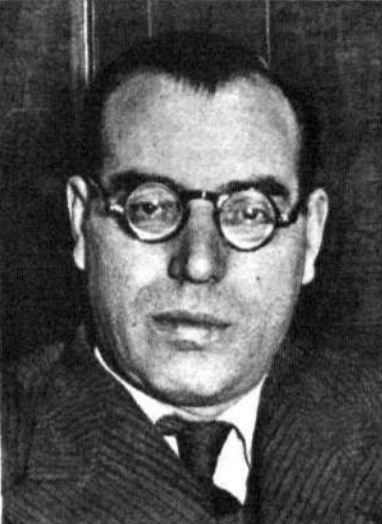
late 1930s

Comorera was Catalan Minister of Justice when emergency tribunals began to operate around the end of April 1937 to examine "acts of disaffection against the regime not provided for or sanctioned under the Common Penal Code or in the special penal laws" and to consider crimes of factionalism. The Anarchists controlled the telephone exchange in Barcelona from October 1936 onward. In a speech on 2 June 1937 Comorera said, "All the interior controls of the telephone exchange were in the service, not of the community, but of one organization, and neither President Azaña nor President Companys, nor anyone else, could speak without an indiscreet controller overhearing." At the PSUC conference in July 1937 Comorera attacked the policy of the POUM and the CNT. He turned his party into a major political force during the civil War. The PSUC was the only communist organization that did not represent a state to be admitted to the Communist International. Comorera was a leading member of the government of Catalonia until the fall of Barcelona and the Republican collapse in 1939.

== Last years: 1939–1958 ==
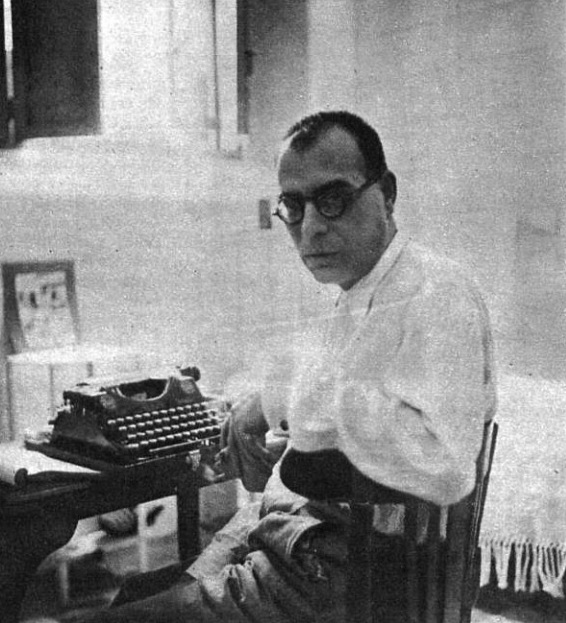
at work

After the civil war Comorera went into exile in France. He moved to Moscow in May 1939, then to Mexico in August 1940. The Spanish Communist leader Pedro Checa died in Mexico on 6 August 1942 due to complications from an appendectomy. The guard of honor for his body consisted of Comorera, Antonio Mije, Ángel Álvarez and Federico Melchor. After Comintern was dissolved in 1943 the PCE made continued efforts to absorb the PSUC, which Comorera resisted. Until the mid-1940s the PSUC under Comorera combined Catalan nationalism, communism and opposition to Franco. The PSUC continued a policy of armed resistance to Franco until 1947, and suffered intense persecution by the Francoists.

Comorera moved to Cuba, then to France in 1945. He was opposed by Santiago Carrillo and his followers in the PCE. Comorera was temporarily made a member of the PCE politburo with the intent of forcing him to submit to its discipline. Dolores Ibárruri was head of the Spanish communists, and Comorera should submit to her, just as Tito (Note: Premier Tito of Yugoslavia refused to conform to the Stalinist party line.) should submit to Stalin. With his Catalan nationalism, his inability to comprehend the incompatibility between bourgeois nationalism and internationalism, Comorera was called the Catalan equivalent of Tito. The PCE Central Committee expelled him on 10 November 1949 for having betrayed the party, the working class and the people. After this PCE pressure to absorb the PSUC slackened.

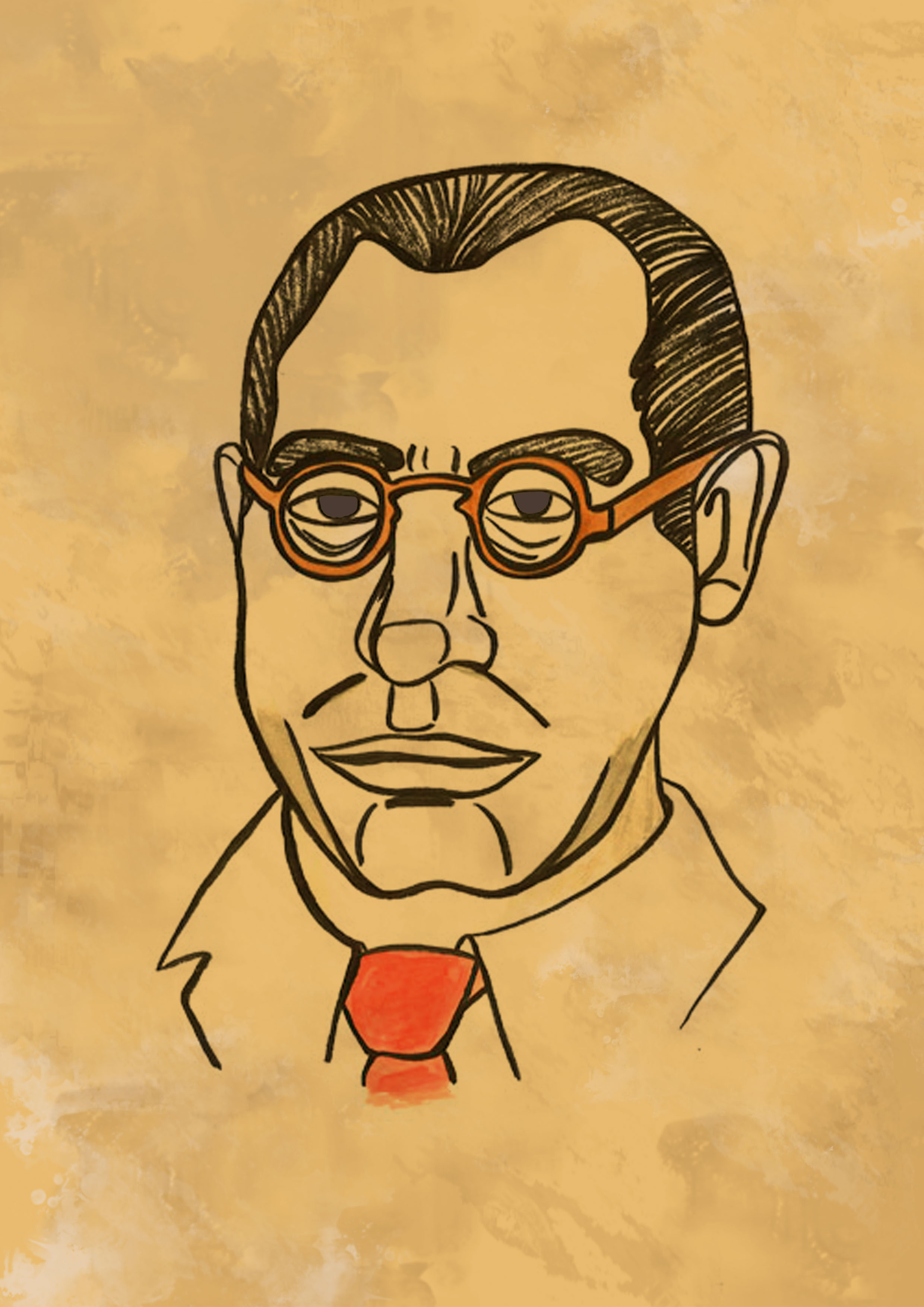
in caricature

Comorera formed his own organization and newspaper, while saying he remained loyal to Stalin and hostile to the "degenerate traitor" Tito. However, he was isolated, denied support by the Cominform or by other communist parties, and attacked by the PCE and the new leaders of the PSUC. His own daughter, Nuri Comorera Santana, denounced him as a traitor in the PSUC journal published in Paris in March 1950. Comorera was blamed by the PCE for having betrayed Gregorio López Raimundo.

Enrique Líster is reported as saying that in 1949 Carrillo ordered the execution of Comorera, who was saved by the precautions he took. Comorera took refuge in Cerdanya, then secretly moved to Spain in April 1951 where he settled in Ripoll under a false name. He continued to be politically active, and published 32 issues of the workers' magazine Treball. Comorera was arrested on 9 June 1954 and on 23 August 1954 was sentenced to thirty years in prison and taken to the Burgos penitentiary. PCE attacks on Comorera continued after his arrest. At the October 1956 PSUC party congress he was blamed for the "cult of personality" in the party.

Joan Comorera died in Burgos prison on 7 May 1958. In 1986 the PCE issued a manifesto that named Comorera and others heroic freedom fighters, a belated rehabilitation.

== Publications ==
- Antoni Sesé; José del Barrio; Juan Comorera (1936). La nuestra situación política actual: Discursos pronunciados ... el dia 20 de diciembre de 1936. Barcelona: Secretariat d'Agitació i Propaganda del P.S.U.
- Jesús Hernández; Joan Comorera (1937). Spain Organises for Victory: The Policy of the Communist Party of Spain. London: Communist Party of Great Britain.
- Joan Comorera (1947). El cami de la victoria: discurs pronunciat en l'acte celebrat a Perpinyà el 27 de juliol del 1947 en ocasió de l'onzè aniversari del P.S.U. de C. Paris: Ed. Lluita.
- Joan Comorera (1948). Nous dénonçons les crimes monstrueux que Franco et la Phalange commettent à la prison "Modèle" de Barcelone. Paris: Ed. Lluita.
- Joan Comorera (1977). Leandre Colomer i Calsina (ed.). Socialisme i qüestió nacional. Barcelona: Undarius.
- Joan Comorera (1987). Miquel Caminal Badia (ed.). Antologia. Barcelona: Ed. de la magrana.

== Sources ==
- Amodia, José (1995). "COMORERA SOLER, Joan". Biographical Dictionary of European Labor Leaders. Greenwood Publishing Group. ISBN 978-0-313-26456-6.
- Bernard, Jean-Pierre Arthur (1991). Paris rouge: 1944-1964: les communistes français dans la capitale (in French). Editions Champ Vallon. ISBN 978-2-87673-117-2.
- Bolloten, Burnett (1979). The Spanish Revolution: The Left and the Struggle for Power during the Civil War. Chapel Hill: University of North Carolina Press.
- Buffery, Helena; Marcer, Elisenda (2010-12-18). "Comorera, Joan (1894-1958)". Historical Dictionary of the Catalans. Scarecrow Press. ISBN 978-0-8108-7514-2.
- Cierva, Ricardo de la (1994). Carrillo miente, 156 documentos contra 103 falsedades (in Spanish). Ed. Fenix.
- Cuevas, Tomasa; Giles, Mary E. (1998). Prison of Women: Testimonies of War and Resistance in Spain, 1939-1975. SUNY Press. ISBN 978-0-7914-3857-2.
- Dowling, Andrew (2013-01-01). Catalonia Since the Spanish Civil War: Reconstructing the Nation. Sussex Academic Press. ISBN 978-1-84519-530-4.
- Elorza, Antonio (1992). "Continuité et rénovation dans le Parti communiste d'Espagne 1947-1956". Les Crises internes des PC ouest-européens, 1944-1956 (in French). L'AGE D'HOMME. ISBN 978-2-8251-0293-0.
- Güell, Casilda (2006-01-01). The Failure of Catalanist Opposition to Franco (1939-1950). Editorial CSIC - CSIC Press. ISBN 978-84-00-08473-8.
- Gutiérrez-Álvarez, Pepe (2015-05-13). "El POUM y el PSUC, dos caras -contrapuestas- de una misma propuesta". Col-lectiu Kaos en la Red (in Spanish).
- Jauregui, Fernando (1986-04-25). "Rehabilitaciones tardías en el PCE". El País (in Spanish). Madrid.
- "Joan Comorera i Soler". Gran Enciclopèdia Catalana (in Catalan).
- Morán, Gregorio (1986). Miseria y grandeza del Partido Comunista de España: 1939-1985 (in Spanish). Barcelona: Planeta. ISBN 84-320-5852-1.
- Pagès i Blanch, Pelai (2013-10-10). War and Revolution in Catalonia, 1936-1939. BRILL. ISBN 978-90-04-25427-5.
- Peirats, José; Ealham, Chris (2005). The CNT in the Spanish Revolution. Vol. 2. East Sussex: Christie Books.
- Preston, Paul (2013). El zorro rojo: La vida de Santiago Carrillo (in Spanish). Debate. ISBN 978-84-9032-422-6.
