= Los Justicieros =

Spanish anarchist militant group (1920–22)

The Avengers
- Los Justicieros
- Leader: Buenaventura Durruti
- Dates active: August 1920–August 1922
- Country: Spain
- Headquarters: San Sebastián (1920); Zaragoza (1921–1922)
- Ideology: Anarchism
- Political position: Far-left

Los Justicieros (English: The Avengers (Note: Also translated as "The Avenging Ones" or "Fighters for Justice")) was a Spanish anarchist militant group. Initially based in San Sebastián, in the Basque Country, the group was forced to flee to Zaragoza after its plot to assassinate King Alfonso XIII was uncovered. It participated in an attempt to establish an Iberian Anarchist Federation, but its efforts were hampered by a government crackdown against the anarchist movement in Madrid and Barcelona. As political repression by the government and attacks by the pistoleros intensified, the group sought to arm itself. With guns acquired from Basque anarchists, the group carried out an armed robbery of a paymaster, which financed the further acquisition of weapons and the clandestine activities of the Confederación Nacional del Trabajo (CNT). When anarchist prisoners in Zaragoza were brought to trial, the group organised a general strike which ultimately secured their acquittal. The group then fell into political and tactical disagreements, with one part, led by Buenaventura Durruti and Francisco Ascaso, moving to Barcelona and founding Los Solidarios.

== Background ==
In the wake of the 1917 Spanish general strike, anarchists in the Basque Country first began carrying out propaganda work in the region, which laid the groundwork for the rise of anarcho-syndicalism. By the time of the Second Congress of the Confederación Nacional del Trabajo (English: National Confederation of Labour; CNT), which took place in 1919, organised anarchist activity was spreading throughout the Basque Country. In San Sebastián, local anarchists led by Moisés Ruiz organised Aragonese and Castilian migrant workers who had been brought to the city to build the Kursaal Casino. He was soon joined by anarchists from Zaragoza and Logroño, including Cristóbal Albadetrecu, Marcelino del Campo, Víctor Elizondo, Clemente Mangado, Inocencio Pina, José Ruiz and Gregorio Suberviola. Although enthusiastic, these new activists lacked strategy, and Ruiz worried that their radicalism would alienate the more moderate locals. To educate them on union organising, he enlisted the help of Manuel Buenacasa, who oversaw their establishment of a construction workers' union. Buenacasa also held public lectures and challenged local socialist leaders to debates, which initiated a conflict between socialists and anarchists for dominance over the Basque labour movement. Seeking to divide and weaken the workers' organisations, Basque business owners sided with the socialists.

== Establishment ==
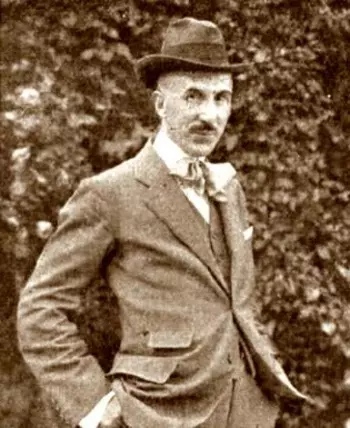
Fernando González Regueral, the governor of Bilbao in 1920

By late 1919, metalworkers' and miners' strikes were becoming more commonplace. The government of Spain responded by cracking down on union organising. In the Basque Country, lieutenant colonel Fernando González Regueral was appointed as governor, and he immediately ordered mass arrests of trade union activists. In Catalonia, groups of mercenaries known as pistoleros (English: gunmen) hunted down and murdered union organisers, while the police applied the ley de fugas (English: law for escapes) to arrested workers. Overwhelmed by these conditions, the CNT was driven underground and appealed for militants to fight back.

At this time, Buenacasa introduced Ruiz, Albadetrecu, del Campo and Suberviola to Buenaventura Durruti, an anarchist from León who had recently arrived in San Sebastián. Together, the five anarchist militants formed a new anarchist group, which they called Los Justicieros (English: The Avengers). The new group responded to the CNT's appeal; they intended to incite rebellion throughout the country, but lacked any coherent strategy to carry this plan out. They also considered moving to Barcelona, but Buenacasa convinced them to stay in San Sebastián.

== Assassination attempt ==
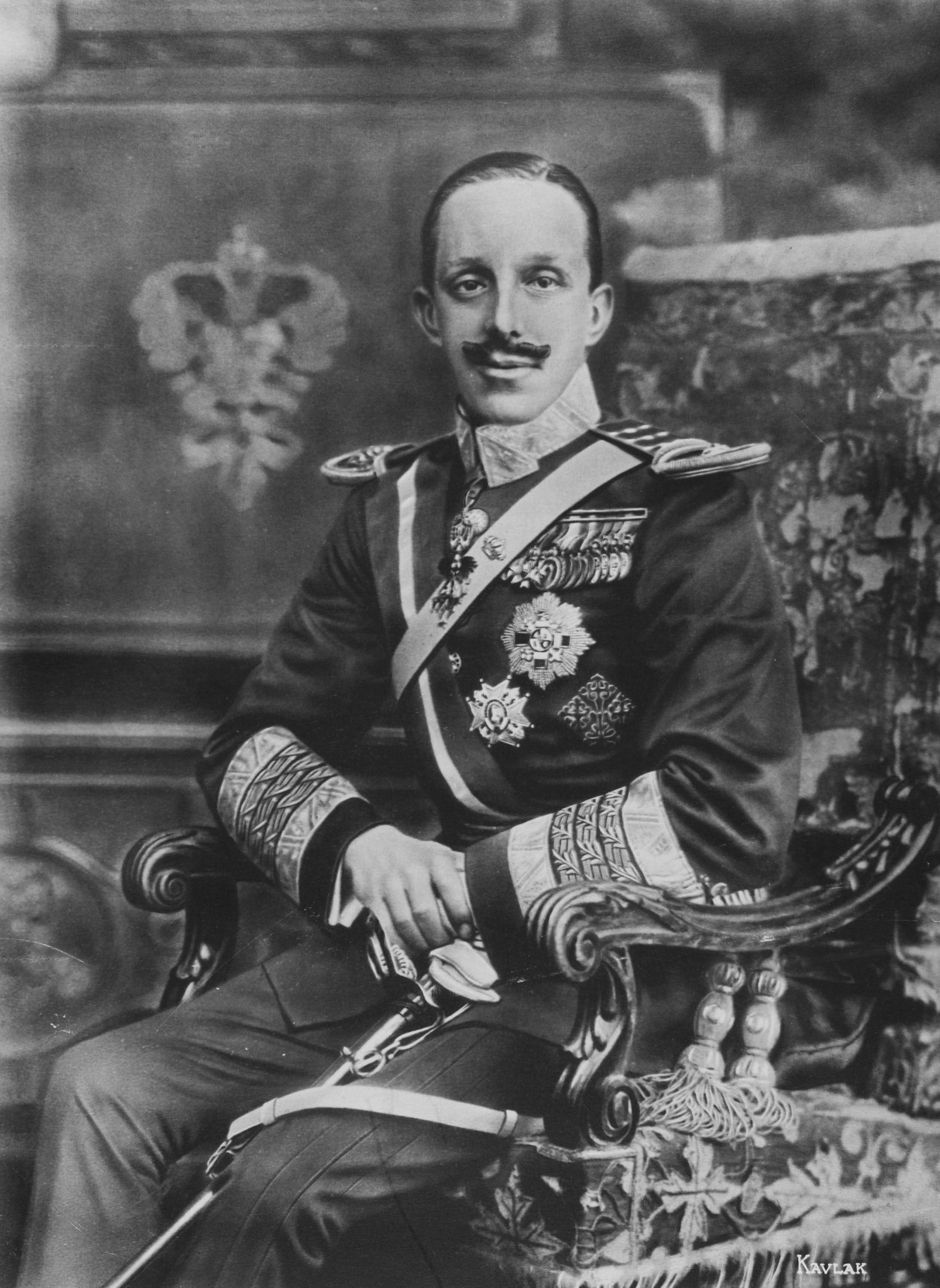
King Alfonso XIII, who Los Justicieros attempted to assassinate in 1920

On 4 August 1920, Valencian anarchists assassinated Francisco Maestre Laborde, the former governor of Barcelona who was responsible for killing at least 33 union members. Inspired by the assassination, Los Justicieros began planning their own attempt against Fernando González Regueral, before learning that King Alfonso XIII intended to attend the opening of the Kursaal Casino. They decided instead to attempt to assassinate the King, which they planned to do by digging a tunnel underneath the guest reception and planting explosives there. Suberviola supervised the digging of the tunnel, while Durruti acquired the explosives.

By the time the tunnel reached the building's foundation, the digging slowed down considerably. Although they had disguised their base of operations as a coal yard, the amount of dirt removed from it attracted police suspicion. When the police searched the property, the group was forced to escape under gunfire. Durruti, Suberviola and del Campo were named by the police and media as the people responsible for the plot. With the aid of sympathetic railway workers, Buenacasa arranged their escape from San Sebastián to Zaragoza by freight train.

== Move to Zaragoza ==
Upon arriving in Zaragoza, the three escapees immediately went to the Centro de Estudios Sociales (English: Social Studies Centre), where the local unions facilitated all of the anarchist movement's activities. There they met the centre's president, the caretaker and Zenón Canudo, the editor of the newspaper El Comunista. Suberviola introduced them to Durruti and del Campo, and they were updated about the state of the movement in Aragón. They found out that, in December 1920, the young militant Francisco Ascaso had been imprisoned and was awaiting a death sentence, having been charged with murdering the editor of the conservative newspaper Heraldo de Aragón. José Chueca then came into the room and shared news of the assassination attempt against the king, naming the three anarchists responsible; the situation made the attendees laugh, which annoyed Chueca, as he did not know that the three were there with him. As they brought the meeting to a close, the three were advised to stay away from the centre, which was possibly under surveillance.

The three then met with Inocencio Pina and Rafael Torres Escartín, and the former gave them all a place to stay at his house on the edge of the city. They were given more details about the government crackdown against the local movement and discovered that Cristóbal Albadetrecu, Clemente Mangado and Manuel Sancho had been imprisoned for attempting to assassinate a local business leader. Pina gave the three new arrivals a choice: to either continue on their journey to Barcelona or stay in Zaragoza. They chose the latter and joined the city's revolutionary movement. The three had difficulty finding work, as local business owners were retaliating against workers for a recent series of strike actions, but they were able to secure jobs with Pina's help. As time went on, the social conflict in the city subsided, allowing Zaragoza's trade unions and workers' press to continue growing.

== Conflict with pistolerismo ==
In early 1921, Los Justicieros and other Aragonese anarchist groups began discussing the establishment of an Iberian anarchist federation. They tasked Durruti and Juliana López with traveling throughout the country and enlisting other anarchist groups to join the proposed federation. In February 1921, the pair left for Andalusia, where they convinced various anarchist groups to federate together and coordinate their actions on a regional basis. They then went to Madrid, but on 8 March, Eduardo Dato was assassinated and the capital was put under a state of siege, preventing them from contacting any of the capital's anarchist groups. They then went to Barcelona and met Domingo Ascaso, with whom they discussed the assassination and rumours that Anido had been ordered to halt repressions against the labour movement, the possibility of which they dismissed. From Ascaso, they learned more about the violence against the Catalan workers' movement by the pistoleros and the danger posed by police informants, which had provoked Catalan anarchists to distance themselves from others and focus on large actions such as the assassination of Dato. Due to these conditions, Ascaso informed them that it was impossible for the Catalan anarchist groups to participate in the proposed federation. He also warned them that the pistoleros intended to extend their activities to Zaragoza. Upon their return to Zaragoza, the local groups decided to prepare for the eventual formation of an Iberian anarchist federation when conditions made holding a national conference possible. Meanwhile, Los Justicieros went to Bilbao to acquire guns.

Durruti and Suberviola made contact with Basque anarchists and enlisted their help in purchasing weapons. The CNT had been driven underground and most of its funds had been spent aiding the families of its arrested members, so they were only able to acquire small amounts of cash and a few pistols from local militants; their suppliers quipped that, at that time, "a gun was the best membership card". With what little they had, Suberviola suggested that the group carry out a bank robbery. Although Escartín and Durruti advised caution due to their lack of experience, they ultimately agreed. They initially planned to rob the Bank of Bilbao, but concluded that the target was too large for them, and instead planned to hold up a paymaster of a metallurgy business in Eibar. On the road between Eibar and Bilbao, the group staged a fake car accident and robbed the paymaster after they pulled over. They reportedly made off with 300,000 pesetas, which they planned to use to acquire 100 Star pistols; the rest of the money was divided in two, half of which they sent to Bilbao and the other half of which was taken back to Zaragoza by López. After several days hiding out, Durruti, Escartín and Suberviola left the Basque Country.

== Restoration of constitutional rights ==
By June 1921, life in Zaragoza was mostly peaceful, with the unions able to work as normal, while the pistoleros had not yet carried out any attacks. Los Justicieros devoted their time to supporting anarchist prisoners, including Francisco Ascaso, who had fallen very ill. At this time, the Spanish government was experiencing a political crisis, as the defeat of Spanish colonial forces by Abd el-Krim in the Battle of Annual had provoked widespread anti-war protests and strikes. Unable to quell the unrest, Manuel Allendesalazar resigned as prime minister and was replaced with Antonio Maura, who was tasked with cracking down on the anti-war and labour movements. Aiming to destroy the labour movement and win over Catalan business owners, Maura imprisoned a large number of union activists, forced chain gangs to maintain the country's roads, and increased the use of assassinations against workers. But when Maura refused to hand the Ministry of Finance over to the Catalans, his governing coalition collapsed. King Alfonso XIII wanted a new government that could imitate the fascist regime of Benito Mussolini, but instead, José Sánchez-Guerra moved to reinstate constitutional rights.

By this time, pistolerismo had already been brought to Aragón by Juan Soldevila, the Archbishop of Zaragoza. In order to get in front of the restoration of constitutional rights, Soldevila ordered the immediate trial of the imprisoned anarchists. While Los Justicieros began to prepare for open conflict, the anarchists' defense lawyer, Eduardo Barriobero, called for mass protests against the trials in order to bide time until the restoration of constitutional rights. The anarchist groups called for a general strike, but the CNT believed that workers would not respond to such a call while the unions were still underground, so Durruti was sent to discuss the issue with the CNT. He proposed that, if the strike failed, then the CNT could denounce the anarchist groups for "adventurism", but if it succeeded, then both would benefit; they thus accepted his proposal. On 19 April, the anarchists began circulating pamphlets calling for a general strike against the trial and organised a political demonstration outside the High Court of Justice of Aragón. The following day, at 06:00, when demonstrators gathered in the streets, the Civil Guard began shooting into the air in an attempt to disperse the crowd, but the demonstrators held still. When the prisoners were brought to the High Court two hours later, they were greeted by cheers from the demonstrators and later by the audience in the court chamber. Barriobero declared that he did not have to prove the defendants' innocence when they had such overwhelming public support, for which he received cheers from the audience. When the plaintiff admitted that he did not recognise any of the defendants, the judge declared them to be innocent, to the celebration of the gathered crowds. On 22 April, Sánchez-Guerra restored constitutional rights.

After constitutional rights were re-established by Sánchez-Guerra, the Aragonese and Catalan unions immediately resumed their activities, without waiting for government approval. In Barcelona, unions held celebrations, mourned the activists that had been killed by the pistoleros, and organised public assemblies to elect new union representatives. Having now recovered from the repression undertaken by the government and pistoleros, the CNT convened a national conference to be held in Zaragoza on 11 June 1922. After the conference was opened by Victoriano Gracia, the government attempted to suspend the meeting, but backed down after the CNT threatened a general strike. Following resolutions to disaffiliate the CNT from the Communist International and join the International Workers' Association (IWA) and the election of Salvador Seguí as General Secretary, Gracia called for the immediate release of Francisco Ascaso from prison. Public pressure from the CNT secured the release of Ascaso, who immediately denounced his treatment by the police at a public rally; he was subsequently blacklisted by local employers.

== Dissolution ==
While Ascaso prepared to move to Barcelona and meet his brother Domingo, he was invited to a meeting of Los Justicieros, where he met Escartín and Durruti. At the meeting, the group debated tactical issues: Pina thought that the group ought to constitute itself as a revolutionary vanguard, but Durruti argued that only the working class as a whole could lead a social revolution and that forming a vanguard would effectively separate them from the working class. Ascaso himself aligned with Durruti's view and the two left the meeting as close friends. Not long after, the group received a letter from Domingo Ascaso, who informed them of the rise of "yellow syndicalism" in Barcelona and a brewing conflict between these new unions and the anarchist groups. Although advised by Domingo himself to stay in Zaragoza, Francisco Ascaso, Durruti, Escartín, Suberviola and del Campo broke from the rest of the group and decided to move to Barcelona. In August 1922, they formed a new group in the Catalan capital, which took the name of Crisol (English: Crucible). This organization formed the nucleus for the militant group Los Solidarios (English: Solidarity), established in October 1922.

== Legacy ==
Durruti and other members of Los Justicieros went on to become the main organisers of resistance to state terrorism in Spain and took leading roles in the 1936 Revolution against the Spanish nationalists. The actions of Los Justicieros influenced the New Afrikan anarchist Kuwasi Balagoon, who read about their raids and assassinations while in prison and who believed their example could be followed by the Black liberation movement.

== Bibliography ==
- Christie, Stuart (2008). We, the Anarchists: A Study of the Iberian Anarchist Federation (FAI). AK Press. ISBN 9781904859758. LCCN 2007939202.
- Gómez Casas, Juan [in Spanish] (1986). Anarchist Organisation: the History of the F.A.I. Translated by Bluestein, Abe. Black Rose Books. ISBN 0-920057-40-3.
- Paz, Abel (2006) [1996]. Durruti in the Spanish Revolution. Translated by Morse, Chuck. Edinburgh: AK Press. ISBN 1-904859-50-X. LCCN 2006920974. OCLC 482919277.
- Umoja, Akinyele K. (2015). "Maroon: Kuwasi Balagoon and the Evolution of Revolutionary New Afrikan Anarchism". Science & Society. 79 (2): 196–220. doi:10.1521/siso.2015.79.2.196.
- Varela, Raquel (2019). "Fascisms' road to power (1929–1939)". Critique. 47 (4): 603–624. doi:10.1080/03017605.2019.1678270.
