= Los Solidarios =

Spanish anarchist militant group (1922–24)

Solidarity
- Los Solidarios
- Leader: Buenaventura Durruti
- Dates active: October 1922 – December 1924
- Country: Spain
- Headquarters: Barcelona
- Newspaper: Crisol
- Ideology: Anarchism
- Political position: Far-left
- Size: ≥30

Los Solidarios (English: Solidarity; or The Solidaristic) was a Spanish anarchist militant group, established in 1922 to combat the rise of pistolerismo and yellow syndicalism, which represented the interests of business owners. At first, the group organised the Catalan anarchist movement, stockpiled weapons and infiltrated the Spanish Armed Forces. Following the assassination of Salvador Seguí, the general secretary of the anarchist trade union centre, the Confederación Nacional del Trabajo (CNT), the group initiated its own campaign of targeted assassinations against officials who they held responsible for state terrorism. In 1923, Los Solidarios assassinated pistolero leader Ramón Laguía, the former governor of Biscay Fernando González Regueral, and the Archbishop of Zaragoza Juan Soldevila. As news began to spread of an impending military coup in the country, Los Solidarios sought to acquire weapons in order to resist the coup. The group robbed a branch of the Bank of Spain in Xixón and used the money to buy rifles, but were ultimately unable to stop the 1923 Spanish coup d'état, which resulted in the establishment of the dictatorship of Miguel Primo de Rivera.

The group subsequently rushed to break its members out of prison and dispatched its most-wanted members to Paris, where they used money from the Xixón robbery to set up a publishing house. In exile, Spanish anarchists reorganised and began to prepare for an attempt to overthrow the dictatorship. In March 1924, the dictatorship carried out a series of raids against the weapons caches and safehouses of Los Solidarios. Several of the group's members were imprisoned or executed, but others escaped capture. As repression in Spain intensified, the group member Domingo Ascaso plotted an insurrection to overthrow the dictatorship. On 6 November 1924, anarchists in Barcelona attempted to storm the Drassanes barracks, while exiled anarchists attempted to launch an offensive from France across the Pyrenees in the Basque Country and Catalonia. The insurrection attempt was defeated on all fronts and many anarchists were imprisoned, exiled or killed. By the end of 1924, members of the Los Solidarios were either in prison, in exile or operating clandestinely in Spain. After the proclamation of the Second Spanish Republic in 1931, Los Solidarios was reunited and reorganised into the Nosotros group.

== Background ==
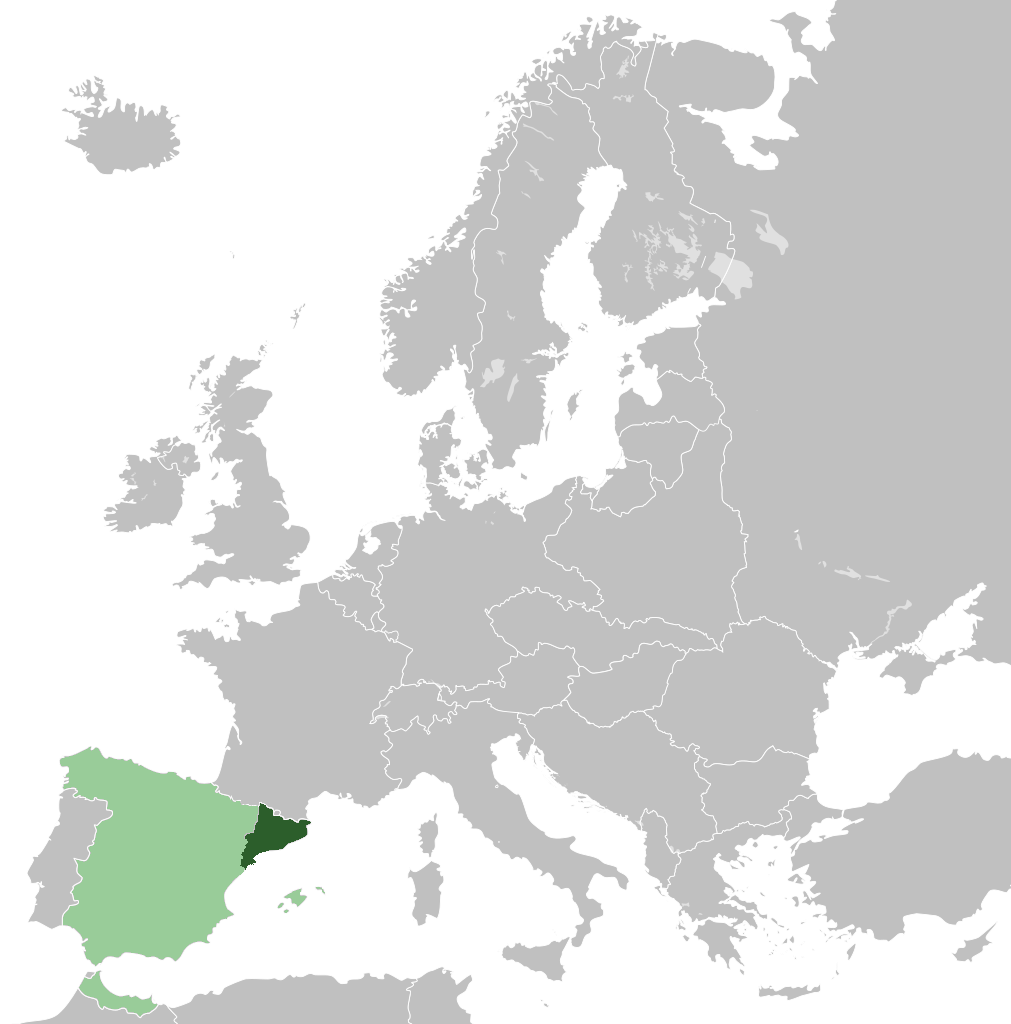
The region of Catalonia (dark green) in Spain (light green)

By the turn of the 20th century in Spain, the industrialised region of Catalonia was facing constant protests and strike actions. The Spanish government responded with political repression, imprisoning and executing many workers. During World War I, the economy of Spain experienced rapid growth due to the preservation of Spanish neutrality. This increased the influence of the organised working class in the Catalan capital of Barcelona, where many migrant workers were moving to participate in the industrial economy. The city soon gained a reputation for Bohemianism, which attracted many activists of the growing Spanish anarchist movement. At the time, Spanish politics was largely dominated by the clergy, aristocracy and military. To challenge this ruling elite, Catalan business owners sought to gain political influence by displacing the two-party system and stoking Catalan nationalist sentiments. During the war, business owners accumulated vast amounts of wealth, while the country at large fell into an economic crisis.

To balance the budget, the Finance Minister Santiago Alba proposed the implementation of a corporation tax. This was staunchly opposed by Francesc Cambó, the leader of the Regionalist League of Catalonia (LRC), who prevented the proposal from passing through parliament and consequently caused the collapse of the government of Álvaro de Figueroa. But when imports were restricted by the subsequent government in 1917, Catalan business owners experienced a decline in their profits. Meanwhile, the working class faced a rising cost of living and political marginalisation, provoking the trade unions of the Unión General de Trabajadores (UGT) and Confederación Nacional del Trabajo (CNT) to call a general strike. In Barcelona, an Assembly of Parliamentarians was formed by the LRC to constitute a provisional government for Catalonia, but it dissolved itself in order to support the repression of Catalan workers by the Spanish government. Many Catalan anarchists fled to the French port city of Marseille, where they clandestinely organised Spanish workers under the banner of the CNT. By January 1919, the CNT had grown so large that half of all workers were affiliated to it; throughout the country, it counted 375,000 members at this time.

== Predecessor ==
In 1919, one of the CNT's most prominent agitators, Manuel Buenacasa, travelled from Barcelona to the Basque city of San Sebastián, where he organised migrant workers who were constructing the Kursaal casino. There he met the young anarchist Buenaventura Durruti, who he put in touch with other anarchist militants, leading to the formation of Los Justicieros (English: The Avengers). The group was formed in response to an intensifying social conflict; in Barcelona, armed mercenary groups known as pistoleros hunted down and murdered union leaders, while the police applied to ley de fugas (executions via staged escape attempts) to imprisoned workers. State terrorism drove the CNT underground and many of its members were forced to either fight, flee or face imprisonment. Los Justicieros initially intended to join the fight in Barcelona, but Buenacasa dissuaded them, telling them they were still needed in San Sebastián. On 4 August 1920, Catalan anarchists assassinated Francisco Maestre Laborde, the civil governor of Barcelona, who had overseen the execution of 33 union leaders; inspired by the attack, Los Justicieros decided to attempt to assassinate the King of Spain, Alfonso XIII. Their plot was uncovered by the police and Buenacasa arranged their escape to Zaragoza.

The new governor of Barcelona, Severiano Martínez Anido, intensified state terror against the workers' movement. He oversaw a mass campaign of assassinations of union leaders and imprisoned many prominent activists, including the CNT's Ángel Pestaña. Young and inexperienced activists were consequently promoted through the ranks of the CNT. In March 1921, after the entire National Committee of the CNT was arrested, it was replaced by a new committee led by the young Andreu Nin, a relatively new member of the organisation who sympathised with Bolshevism.

Seeking to establish an Iberian Anarchist Federation, Los Justiceros dispatched Durruti to Barcelona to contact Catalan anarchist groups. There he was greeted by Domingo Ascaso, who told him of the heavy political repression that the movement was facing: prominent CNT activists, including Salvador Seguí, Evelio Boal and Joan Peiró had been imprisoned; the pistoleros effectively operated as a private police force for factory owners and routinely executed union activists; the CNT had also been infiltrated by police informants, who had turned in many anarchist activists to the authorities. In this environment, Catalan anarchist groups had closed ranks, distancing themselves from others and concentrating on large actions, including the assassination of prime minister Eduardo Dato. Under these conditions, Ascaso informed Durruti that joining a wider anarchist federation was impossible.

== Establishment ==
=== Founding ===
Following the defeat of the Spanish colonial forces by Abd el-Krim at the Battle of Annual in Spanish Morocco, mass protests broke out against the continuation of the Rif War. Alfonso XIII tasked the Conservative prime minister Antonio Maura with crushing working class resistance. Maura attempted to win over Catalan business owners by intensifying political repression against the workers' movement, but after he refused to hand the Ministry of Finance over to the LRC, his government collapsed in March 1922. Alfonso XIII hoped that a new government would be able to imitate the fascist regime of Benito Mussolini, but instead, the government of José Sánchez-Guerra restored constitutional rights on 22 April 1922. Catalan trade unions immediately resumed their public activities, while many of their political prisoners were released.

The CNT managed to recover, with its ranks even increasing in some cases. The Wood Workers' Union called an assembly at Barcelona's Victoria Theatre, which was opened by the anarchist journalist Liberto Callejas reading out the names of the 107 activists who had been murdered by the pistoleros. The assembly nominated a new union committee and elected the Aragonese carpenter Gregorio Jover as representative of the Barcelona Local Federation of the CNT. Ascaso wrote a letter to his brother, Francisco, who had recently been released from prison. He warned that the pistoleros had reorganised around yellow syndicalism, forming pro-corporate trade unions, and worried that a new offensive against the working class was being prepared by employers. In response to the letter, in August 1922, five members of Los Justicieros (Buenaventura Durruti, Francisco Ascaso, Rafael Torres Escartín, Gregorio Suberviola and Marcelino del Campo) moved to Barcelona. There they reorganised into a new group, which they called Crisol (English: Crucible).

By the time the Crisol group arrived in Barcelona, a general strike had been called in response to an assassination attempt against Pestaña. Catalan intellectuals denounced the continuation of attacks by the pistoleros, while socialist deputy Indalecio Prieto demanded the resignation of Martínez Anido, and Catalan nationalists led by Francesc Macià called for the independence of Catalonia. In response, the employers and clergy reorganised pistolerismo into the Sindicatos Libres, a company union which they forced their workers to join by firing any CNT affiliates. Members of Crisol formed an alliance with activists of the CNT Woodworkers' Union, with whom they established a new affinity group, Los Solidarios, in October 1922. They planned to confront the pistoleros and support the CNT, with the eventual goal of establishing an Iberian Anarchist Federation, which they saw as a necessary precondition for social revolution. According to Ricardo Sanz, Los Solidarios functioned as a leaderless, non-hierarchical organisation. Historian Murray Bookchin depicted them as having more closely resembled a community than a structured political organisation.

To propagate their ideas, they released a weekly newspaper titled Crisol. The paper was edited by Francisco Ascaso, who received contributions from Felipe Alaiz, Obdulio Barthe, Liberto Callejas and Torres Tribo. Crisol frequently cited the works of the Russian anarchist philosopher Mikhail Bakunin; the group followed Bakunin's tactic of forming a clandestine cell system within a large trade union organisation and believed his strategy could be applied in the struggle against a military dictatorship, which they believed would soon be established in Spain. Following the model of the Russian Revolution and the example of the Bolsheviks, Crisol believed that they could establish a dictatorship of the proletariat through the creation of revolutionary committees and workers' councils, which would be capable of uniting skilled and unskilled workers behind a common cause. Crisol also attacked King Alfonso XIII, who the paper called a "felon king" (Spanish: el rey felón), due to his continued prosecution of the Rif War.

=== Barcelona Conference ===
With Sánchez-Guerra having solidified constitutional order in Catalonia, Los Solidarios called a conference of Catalan anarchist groups. Fifty delegates attended the conference, including Ángel Pestaña, the former editor of Solidaridad Obrera who had recently been released from prison. Other anarchist activists, including Tomás Herreros, Juan Manuel Molina and Joan Montseny, were also among the attendees. Held in December 1922, the conference recognised Los Solidarios as the leading action group in the Catalan capital. They adopted a motto which encapsulated their desire for collective action, "to act for all" (Spanish: ir a por el todo).

Los Solidarios warned the conference that, despite the re-established peace, the "bourgeoisie" would continue their attacks against the working classes. They believed that the Spanish Army, with the support of the clergy and landowning aristocracy, would attempt to establish a military dictatorship; they thus called on anarchist groups to accelerate their revolutionary activities. They also called for anarchists to revise their anti-militarist strategies, which previously involved conscription evasion, and to instead join the Spanish Army. Within the army, they were directed to form Anti-militarist Committees, which would spread anarchist ideas among the soldiers and coordinate with other anarchist groups.

The Conference culminated with the establishment of a Liaison Commission, the nucleus for what would become the Iberian Anarchist Federation (FAI). The composition of the commission changed over time, with Molina becoming its provisional secretary, and Manuel Molet and Jeremias Roig also serving. Los Solidarios members formed the centre of the commission: Francisco Ascaso was appointed as general secretary, a position from which he built alliances with other regional anarchist groups; Durruti was tasked with acquiring weapons and explosives; and Aurelio Fernández Sánchez was dispatched to join the army, within which he won over several non-commissioned officers and established a number of Anti-militarist Committees. Pestaña himself was expelled from the Commission due to his opposition to armed insurrection.

== Assassination campaign ==
=== Initiation ===
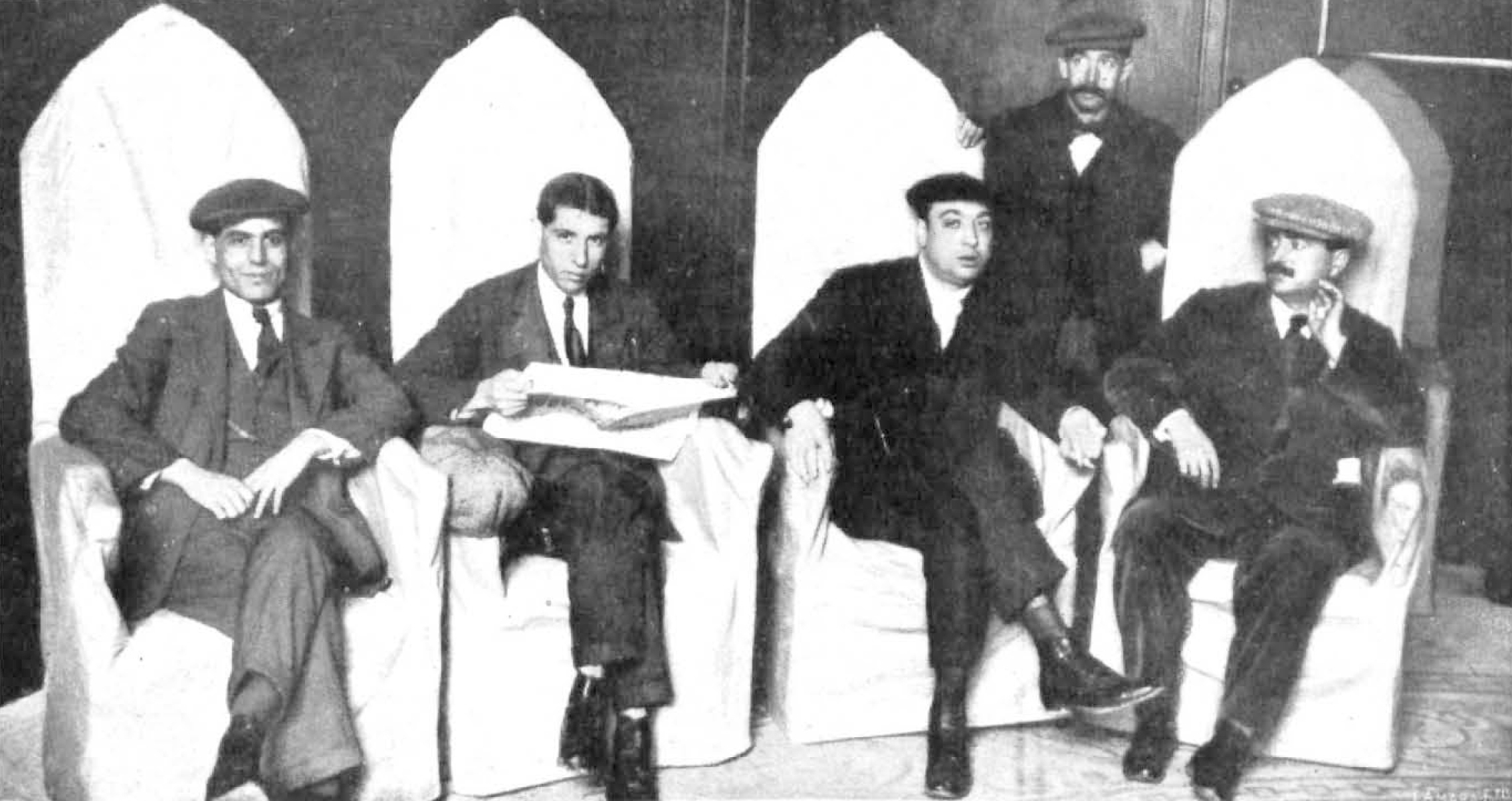
Salvador Seguí (second from right), the General Secretary of the Confederación Nacional del Trabajo, whose murder ignited a revenge campaign of assassinations by Los Solidarios

As their initial attempts to coordinate workers' and soldiers' councils stalled, Los Solidarios pivoted towards a different tactic: assassination. One of the first plans of Los Solidarios had been to assassinate Martínez Anido and police chief Miguel Arlegui, but they halted preparations after discovering that the two had planned to stage a fake assassination attempt against themselves, as a pretext for continuing political repression. The two officials' ultimate objective had been to carry out a massacre against syndicalists on Saint Bartholemew's Day. Martínez Anido stationed pistoleros (strikebreakers) outside of a hospital, where Pestaña was recovering from gunshot wounds from a prior assassination attempt, with orders to kill him after he was discharged. The plot was publicised by the Catalan press, preventing it from going ahead. On 24 October 1922, after Prime Minister Sánchez-Guerra was informed of the plot, he dismissed the two of them from their positions. Governorship of the province of Barcelona was temporarily turned over to the Provincial Court.

In January 1923, the government introduced new labour laws which legalised individual trade unions and permitted collective bargaining under government supervision. The new law also prohibited national trade union centers and the adoption of a political ideology by trade unions, which restrained the activities of the CNT. On 10 March 1923, CNT General Secretary Salvador Seguí was murdered by pistoleros. Many anarchists claimed the assassination was carried out on the orders of the Catalan employers' federation; while sensationalist newspapers spread rumours that the attack had been carried out by anarchists, who had grown frustrated with the moderate leadership of the CNT. Los Solidarios themselves claimed the assassination were carried out by agents of the monarchy, as an attempt to cover up the role of King Alfonso XIII in the defeat at the Battle of Annual. After the CNT organised a general strike in Seguí's honour on 13 March 1923, the police arrested more than 900 people.

Los Solidarios responded by putting together a list of reactionaries who they held responsible for state terrorism against anarchists, targeting them for assassination. Among the list were Martínez Anido and Arlegui, as well as former interior ministers Rafael Coello and Gabino Bugallal, the governor of Biscay Fernando González Regueral, and the Archbishop of Zaragoza Juan Soldevila. One group of anarchists carried out an attack against Josep Pons, the vice-president of the employers' federation. Other anarchist groups launched an attack against the Hunters' Circle, a local headquarters of pistoleros, and gunned down many of its members. Radicalised workers also fired on police that entered their neighbourhoods. This prompted a number of pistoleros to flee the city, which left business owners in need of police protection. As members of Los Solidarios received no salaries and spent most of their money purchasing weapons and explosives, the group needed money to sustain themselves and their insurgency. They decided to rob a cash-in-transit operation of the City Council of Barcelona, despite the council employees being under police protection. The group intercepted the transfer at the intersection of La Rambla and Carrer de Ferran, disarmed the police and escaped with 100,000 pesetas. Durruti took some of the money to Madrid and gave it to the legal defense fund for Pere Mateu and Lluís Nicolau, who had been charged with murdering Eduardo Dato.

Los Solidarios discovered that the pistolero leader Ramón Laguía, who they suspected of murdering Salvador Seguí, was hiding out in Manresa. Francisco Ascaso and Joan Garcia Oliver went there and located him at a local bar, where he was playing cards with three other pistoleros. Los Solidarios shot Laguía and fled the scene. In revenge for the attack, Ramón Sales, the leader of the Sindicatos Libres, ordered the murder of Ascaso, Garcia Oliver and Durruti. While attempting to evade the pistoleros, Los Solidarios pressed forward with their own assassination plans: Ascaso, Torres Escartín and Fernández Sánchez were dispatched to San Sebastián to assassinate Martínez Anido; and Suberviola and Antonio Rodríguez went to León to assassinate Fernando González Regueral. They later collaborated with the Catalan nationalist Miquel Badia on a plot to assassinate Alfonso XIII by bombing the king's train, but the attempt was unsuccessful.

=== Attempt against Martínez Anido ===
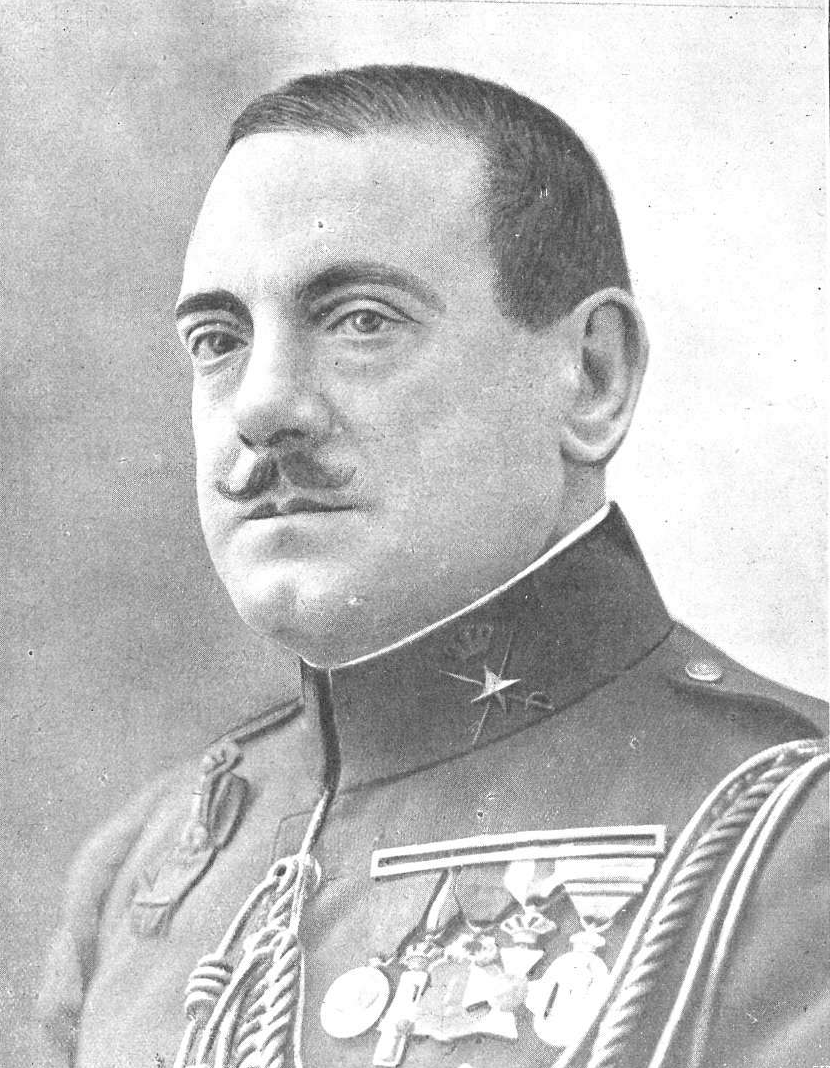
Severiano Martínez Anido, the civil governor of Barcelona, who Los Solidarios attempted to assassinate in San Sebastián

Following his dismissal, Martínez Anido had gone into hiding in San Sebastián, but he was tracked down by members of Los Solidarios, who went to the city armed with guns and explosives. He kept a regular itinerary, going on daily walks between the neighbourhoods of Mirakontxa and Ondarreta, along the Beach of La Concha, before going to the Gran Kursaal. Los Solidarios knew this and observed the road from a café, waiting to spot Martínez Anido; Torres Escartín was surprised to come face-to-face with him at the cafe. Lamenting that they hadn't brought their weapons with them and worried that Martínez Anido was now aware of their presence, Ascaso proposed that they take their guns and shoot him wherever they saw him.

They searched for him at all the places he usually visited, but found him nowhere. Martínez Anido had already left San Sebastián for the Galician city of A Coruña, so the three followed him there. Upon arrival, Ascaso and Fernández Sánchez spoke to dockworkers about shipping weapons to Barcelona, while Torres Escartín contacted the local CNT branch. Before they could reunite, Ascaso and Fernández were arrested under suspicion of drug trafficking. The two convinced the police that they were seeking to emigrate to Latin America and, after they were released, they immediately left Galicia, abandoning their mission. Martínez Anido later arrived at the police station to question the two men, but when he discovered that the "dangerous anarchists following in his footsteps to kill him" had been released, he fired the local police captain.

When Ascaso and Fernández returned to Barcelona, they found out that Durruti had been arrested in Madrid. Ascaso enlisted the Catalan lawyer Joan Rusiñol to help Durruti escape. Ascaso, Rusiñol, and Torres Escartín went to San Sebastián to defend Durruti. Durruti had been accused of robbing the Basque trader Ramón Mendizábal, but at Durruti's trial, Mendizábal proclaimed Durruti to have been innocent of the crime. With his participation in the plotted assassination of the King also in doubt, Durruti was acquitted of the charges of armed robbery and attempted regicide, although he would remain in prison for desertion. Martínez Anido would remain in hiding until the end of the period of pistolerismo later that year.

=== Assassination of Fernando González Regueral ===
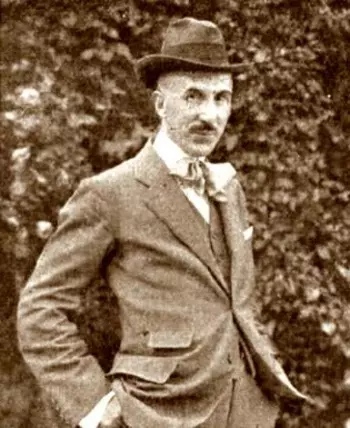
Fernando González Regueral, the ex-governor of Bilbao, who was assassinated by Los Solidarios in León

In Durruti's home city of León, in May 1923, the local patronal festival was underway. On 17 May, the city's elites, as well as former Bilbao governor Fernando González Regueral, attended a performance of the theatre play El rey que rabió. Regueral and his police escort left the theatre early, and as he walked down the stairs, he was shot by Suberviola and Rodríguez, who had been waiting for him. In the confusion and panic caused by the assassination, the two Solidarios disappeared into the crowd; the police never saw who fired the shots. The following day's newspapers erroneously claimed the attack to be the work of a local anarchist group. The police arrested the head of the CNT's León branch, Vicente Tejerina, and Durruti's brother Santiago. They also attempted to arrest Durruti's father in his sickbed, but they were prevented by his family and neighbours. By the following day, the arrested men were released due to a lack of evidence against them. The police never caught Suberviola or Rodríguez.

=== Assassination of Juan Soldevila ===
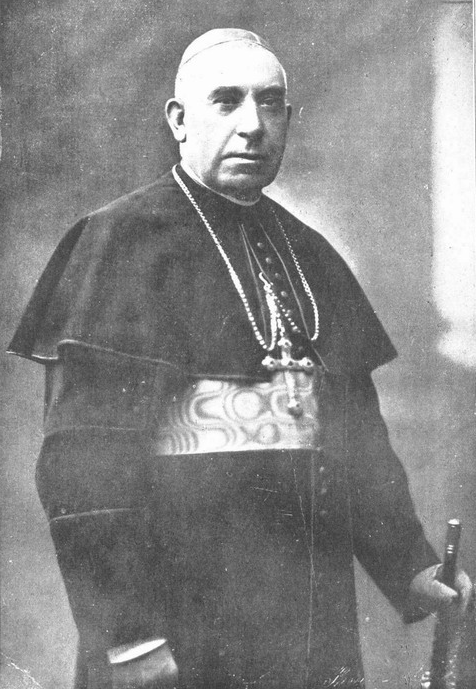
Archbishop of Zaragoza Juan Soldevila, whose assassination implicated members of Los Solidarios

Although they had hoped to wait for Durruti's release, the circumstances prompted Ascaso and Torres Escartín to leave San Sebastián for Zaragoza. They stayed there in a small house with the old anarchist feminist Teresa Claramunt, who admonished them for their violent actions. They defended their actions due to the climate of violence brought to the city by the pistoleros. They held Archbishop Juan Soldevila responsible for the violence, as he had given the church's protection to local pistoleros, and aimed to eliminate him. On 4 June 1923, Soldevila and his nephew Luis Latre Jorro left the archbishop's palace in a black car and headed towards their country estate. When they reached the property, the driver stopped the car and waited for the gates to be opened. Two men standing by the gates drew pistols and opened fire on the car, killing Soldevila and wounding his nephew and driver, before disappearing.

Alfonso XIII immediately ordered the Archbishopric of Zaragoza and his own staff to investigate the attack. The Heraldo de Aragón published a photograph of Soldevila's body on its front page and wrote three pages on the police investigation. While tracing the assassins' path of escape, police found an unloaded pistol with the mark of Alkartasuna, a Basque weapons manufacturer based in Gernika. The escape route ended at the Delicias neighbourhood of Zaragoza, but nobody there could provide information about the assassins.

Under pressure from Conservative Party leader Juan de la Cierva and Interior Minister Martín Rosales Martel, the local administration in Zaragoza ordered a series of arbitrary arrests against local anarchists and the labour movement. But when Zaragoza CNT leader Victoriano Gracia warned that the government would bear responsibility "if even one innocent worker is arrested", the governor ordered police to ensure any arrests were based on hard evidence and ordered the release of people that had been arbitrarily detained. On 28 June, the Spanish government intervened, ordering the arrest of Ángel Pestaña and other prominent anarcho-syndicalists, who they charged with terrorism.

Ascaso was also arrested by police and charged with the murder of Soldevila, despite him having an alibi, with witnesses confirming that he had visited prisoners at the time of the assassination. Newspapers quickly reported that Ascaso, a member of Durruti's "gang", was the assassin. The government and the Catholic Church pushed for further arrests of anarchists, with police even taking a woman sick with tuberculosis as hostage to force her son Esteban Euterio Salamero Bernard to turn himself in. In the end, Ascaso, Torres Escartín, Salamero and Juliana López were charged with the murder of Soldevila.

== Coup of 1923 ==
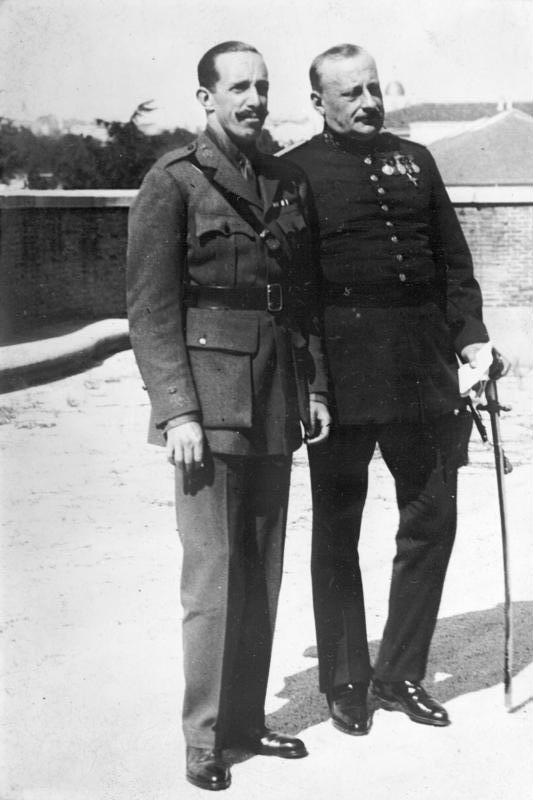
Alfonso XIII (left) and Miguel Primo de Rivera, the two primary figures of the 1923 Spanish coup d'état and subsequent dictatorship

When Durruti was finally released from prison, he returned to Barcelona, where he found the CNT had split into three tendencies: revolutionaries, who wanted to make armed robbery a CNT strategy; moderates, led by Ángel Pestaña, who denounced illegalism; and Bolsheviks, led by Andreu Nin and Joaquim Maurín, who wanted to seize control of the CNT. Meanwhile, in national politics, left-wing political parties were collapsing to internal divisions, while business owners and the clergy were funnelling more support towards the Spanish Army. At this time, Liberal prime minister Manuel García Prieto received documents outlining Alfonso XIII's responsibility for the military disaster at Annual, which would cause a political scandal once they were made public. The government soon collapsed into infighting between Africanists, led by Niceto Alcalá-Zamora, and their anti-war opponents, led by Luis Silvela. The latter's efforts to bring an end to the war were vetoed by Zamora, forcing Silvela to resign as Navy Minister. His successor appointed Martínez Anido as commander in Melilla.

The internal conflicts in the CNT and the government were the main topic of discussion for Los Solidarios in Barcelona. One of their members who had infiltrated the military, Captain Alejandro Sancho, reported of an imminent military coup being planned by General Miguel Primo de Rivera. Sancho said that it had become difficult for the group's Anti-militarist Committees to organise, due to an increase in surveillance. He thought it unclear how rank-and-file soldiers would respond to a coup, but hoped that they might choose to fraternise with workers. Los Solidarios responded to the reports of an imminent coup by proposing a revolutionary general strike, which would require the revival of repressed trade unions and money for weaponry. Durruti and Torres Escartín resolved to rob the Bank of Spain in the Asturian city of Xixón. On their way to Asturias, they briefly stopped in Zaragoza, where Torres Escartín had been charged for the murder of Soldevila. There they became involved in a plan to break Ascaso and other detainees out of prison. Durruti and Torres Escartín offered money from the planned robbery to bribe the prison guards. They also found out that, on 13 June, the anarchist activists Inocencio Pina, Luis Muñoz and Antonio Mur had been arrested after a shootout with the police, under the command of Santiago Martín Báguenas. The two then travelled to Bilbao, where they linked up with an engineer who said he could procure thousands of rifles if they had the money.

By the time two Solidarios arrived in Xixón, Primo de Rivera had begun preparations for the coup and subsequent repression of anarcho-syndicalism. At this time, only the anarchist movement was planning to resist the coup; Garcia Oliver met with the CNT national committee to make plans for a revolutionary general strike, but Pestaña informed him that repression and internal divisions had already devastated the organisation, leaving it unable to meet the needs of a social revolution. Pestaña also said that, without any other organisations with which they could form an alliance against the coup, the CNT would be alone in opposing the dictatorship. Los Solidarios redoubled their efforts to organise against the coming coup.

By August 1923, Durruti and Torres Escartín were beginning preparations for the robbery. They urgently requested other Solidarios to join them, as 1,000 rifles had already been ordered from the arms manufacturer Garate, Anitua y Compañía in Eibar. On 1 September 1923, members of Solidarios carried out an armed robbery of the Xixón bank branch. They seized money from the bank vault and shot the bank manager Luis Azcárate Alvarez after a struggle, wounding him in the neck. They made off with more than half a million pesetas in cash, stolen from the payroll of the business group Duro Felguera. They left the bank and escaped in a getaway car, pursued by the Civil Guard, who found and arrested the driver outside of the city. The driver told them that the robbers had hired him for a trip from Uviéu to Xixón and hijacked his car. After returning his car to him, they went to the train station at Llanera. The Civil Guard cordoned off the whole province in the search for the robbers. In an interview with journalists, Rosales Martel estimated that more than 700,000 pesetas had been stolen, although the Solidarios themselves only made off with 650,000, implying they had left a cut behind for their victims. The Xixón robbery was one of the largest "expropriations" carried out by anarchists during this period.

Instead of going to Llanera as planned, the Solidarios split up: Miguel García Vivancos and Fernández Sánchez went over the mountains to Bilbao in order to purchase the rifles, slipping through the Civil Guard security cordon; Durruti, Brau, Torres Escartín and Suberviola hid out in a mountainside cabin. On 3 September, Civil Guards appeared outside their cabin, leading to a shootout. The four split up into two pairs, with Brau and Torres Escartín fleeling one way, while Durruti and Suberviola left in another direction. Brau and Torres Escartín ended up in an hours-long gun battle with the Civil Guards. When they had almost ran out of ammunition, Brau attempted to rush the police lines and seize an officer's Mauser; Brau was shot and killed. Torres Escartín was knocked out with a rifle butt and taken to the prison in Uviéu, where he was tortured. As Torres Escartín was wanted for the murder of Archbishop Soldevila, authorities in Zaragoza requested his transfer there. Before the transfer took place, he and other prisoners organised a prison break. After jumping over the prison wall, he twisted his ankle, so he told his comrades to escape without him. He collapsed in front of a church and the priest alerted the Civil Guard, who brought him back to the prison.

By the time that the Solidarios had purchased their rifles, the beginnings of the military coup were already underway. Alfonso XIII and Primo de Rivera brought forward the date for the coup, in order to prevent the presentation of documents outlining the king's responsibility for the Annual disaster to the Congress of Deputies. On 13 September 1923, Primo de Rivera called the press to his office and presented them with a manifesto, in which he announced the creation of a military junta to take control of the country. Political parties were eliminated, soldiers occupied Congress and the Picasso files disappeared. The CNT called on the working class to resist the coup with a general strike, but no popular rebellion would manifest. The Spanish Socialist Workers' Party (PSOE) and UGT rejected calls for an uprising and recognised the new dictatorship. When Alfonso XIII arrived in Madrid, he dismissed García Prieto's government and handed power to Primo de Rivera, who abolished the constitution. On 23 September, the CNT was banned by the new dictatorship.

== Clandestinity and exile ==
With the establishment of the dictatorship, the CNT was again driven underground, making illegalism its driving theory and practice. The Solidarios also stepped up their operational security, while making preparations to break Ascaso and Torres Escartín out of prison. They sent some of their members to France, where they were to provide support to a new Revolutionary Committee, established in Barcelona to fight the dictatorship. By October 1923, the Solidarios had purchased 1,000 rifles, 200,000 bullets, and 12 machine guns. The weapons and ammunition was shipped to the port of Barcelona, where they remained for some time, while the anarchists and their Catalan nationalist allies negotiated on how they would be used. They also used part of their money from the Xixón robbery to buy a foundry in Poblenou, where they manufactured grenades. At the foundry, Durruti and Eusebi Brau oversaw the manufacturing and storage of 6,000 hand grenades. Their grenade stockpile in the Barcelona neighbourhood of Poble-sec was ultimately discovered by police, but they had several weapons caches throughout the city that went unnoticed. From France and Belgium, members of Los Solidarios coordinated an arms trafficking network, which shipped weapons into Spain through the border town of Puigcerdà. Antonio Martín smuggled the weapons across the France–Spain border. With these arms, Los Solidarios carried out a series of lone wolf attacks against police stations and banks, which provoked retaliations from the Civil Guard.

With help from sympathisers in the Pyrenees, members of Los Solidarios began to escape Spain. In November 1923, García Vivancos went to Uviéu, where he planned to break Torres Escartín out of prison. He mobilised a regiment of prison guards to coordinate the escape, but at the last moment, the regiment was replaced with a different one. While he attempted to win the new regiment over, local police began to question his business in the city. He convinced them that he was a traveling salesman of knitted fabric, but believing now that the regiment transfer had been deliberate, he left Asturias and returned to Barcelona. Meanwhile, in Zaragoza, Los Solidarios broke several of its activists out of prison and organised their escape to France. Instead of following them to France, and despite Buenacasa's attempts to convince him to leave the country, Francisco Ascaso decided to return to Barcelona.

The group soon learned that Ascaso's escape had intensified Martínez Anido's antipathy towards the "Durruti gang", which he intended to finally repress using the powers of the new dictatorship. Fearing for their lives, the group sent Ascaso and Durruti to Paris. With the last of the money from the Xixón robbery, they were tasked with establishing a revolutionary centre in exile and publishing propaganda with the Anarcho-Communist Union (ACU). Upon arrival, Ascaso and Durruti immediately went to the ACU offices on rue Petit in the 19th arrondissement of Paris, where they met with the administrator Séverin Férandel and his companion Berthe Fabert. The ACU agreed to help them with their new publishing project, to which the two Solidarios contributed 500,000 francs. With the French Sébastien Faure, Spanish Valeriano Orobón Fernández and Italian Virgilio Gozzoli, they established the International Anarchist Press, which published a number of magazines and Faure's own Anarchist Encyclopedia. The Spanish press soon ran stories about the extravagant spending by the Solidarios, alleging that Muñoz had used his share to buy land for his family in Iniesta.

By 1924, many more Spanish anarchists were already fleeing from the dictatorship to France. Most of them concentrated in Occitania, where they began organising emigrant networks and producing new Spanish language publications. This wave of organisation culminated with the establishment of the Anarchist Federation of Spanish-speaking Groups in Exile, a forerunner of the Iberian Anarchist Federation (FAI). Most Spanish anarchists remained optimistic and desired to return to Spain to overthrow the dictatorship. On 30 December 1923, the CNT reorganised itself into a clandestine organisation. In contrast with the optimistic Spaniards, Italian and Russian anarchists who had fled to France had become dejected, due to their respective experiences with the authoritarianism of the Bolsheviks and the Fascists. French anarchists had also lost influence over the labour movement, as Socialists and Communists had respectively gained control over the trade unions of the CGT and CGTU.

The rise of Bolshevism caused Los Solidarios to reflect on the outcome of Russian Revolution; they believed the revolution had been corrupted by the circumstances of World War I, which resulted in the suppression of its most revolutionary tendencies and the establishment of a dictatorship. As the Bolsheviks had emerged from the war as the only organisation with a clear structure and objective, they were able to subordinate all others to its goal of seizing power. They thus concluded that if anarchists were to have greater influence over revolutionary movements, they would need to develop the revolutionary capabilities of the working classes through continuous direct action, rather than embroiling themselves in theoretical debates.

== Suppression ==
The dictatorship focused much of its repressive apparatus on the Catalan anarchist movement, with Martínez Anido, the new Interior Minister, specifically targeting Los Solidarios. Using police informants, the dictatorship discovered their armouries and identified their safe houses. On 24 March 1924, police raided Suberviola's home. He attempted to escape by shooting his way out, but he was surrounded and executed; the authorities never knew he had participated in either the Xixón bank robbery or the assassination of Regueral. Soon after, police spies masquerading as persecuted anarchists asked Marcelino del Campo to take them to a safe house. Police ambushed him after he emerged into the street. He managed to kill two with his pistol, before being killed himself.

Police then raided Fernández Sánchez's house, where they arrested him and his two brothers. They were charged for the Xixón bank robbery. When they emerged into the street, Fernández pushed his brothers into the path of the police and ran away, managing to escape through Chinatown. While he fled the police, his brother Ceferino and their comrade Adolfo Ballano would remain in prison for the remainder of the dictatorship. Police attempted to raid Domingo Ascaso's home, but he heard them coming up his building's stairwell and managed to lower himself down to the street using a rope he had kept for such an occasion. After his own arrest, Gregorio Jover took advantage of lax police vigilance to escape through a window in the police station. By the end of the raids against Los Solidarios, Domingo Ascaso, Fernández Sánchez, Joan Garcia Oliver, Gregorio Jover, Alfonso Miguel and Ricardo Sanz still had not been captured. Miguel and Sanz themselves took over the responsibilities of Suberviola and del Campo in the Revolutionary Committee. After days of hiding out in a mausoleum in the Poblenou cemetery, Domingo Ascaso managed to find Garcia Oliver. He informed him that he was going to reunite with his brother and Durruti in Paris, so that they could accelerate preparations for revolution. By this time, the Crisol editorial board, including Ramona Berni, Gregorio Jover and Pepita Not, had also fled to France.

In May 1924, Garcia Oliver attended a national meeting of the CNT in Sabadell. The police raided the meeting, but most of the participants were able to escape. Garcia Oliver himself was arrested at the train station and transferred to Burgos, where he spent the next six years in prison. By this time, Catalan liberals had seen promises of regional autonomy give way to political repression. Primo de Rivera outlawed the Catalan language and the Senyera flag, and by the following year, he had dissolved the Commonwealth of Catalonia. In response to the repression, Francesc Macià's Estat Català party sought an alliance with the anarchists, with some of its members even joining the Revolutionary Committee.

== Attempted insurrection ==
By the time of his arrival in Paris, Domingo Ascaso had put together a plan for an insurrection: guerrillas were to cross the Pyrenees into Catalonia and break hundreds of anarchists out of prison in Figueres; meanwhile, Los Solidarios were to finally seize the rifles they had bought in Eibar from the port of Barcelona, and with the support of soldiers in the Drassanes barracks, carry out an uprising. He soon began putting together a team of trusted people for the guerrilla operation, while awaiting a delegate from Barcelona to tell them when the local movement was ready. In July 1924, Gregorio Jover arrived in Paris. He informed Ascaso that all the Barcelona anarchist groups supported the operation and they had the commitment of sympathetic anti-authoritarian soldiers. While the Ascaso brothers and Durruti planned the operation, García Vivancos contacted a Belgian arms dealer, who sold him various calibers of pistol. By September 1924, the plans for the Pyrenees offensive were sketched out.

While the Paris cell was making progress, in Barcelona, plans for the insurrection were already falling apart: the soldiers of Drassanes were losing interest, Los Solidarios had been unable to get the Eibar rifles from the port, and some activists were sceptical about whether workers would join them in an uprising. News of this caused hesitation among the revolutionaries in Paris, but Durruti and Ascaso remained optimistic about their chances and convinced their comrades to stay committed. Soon after, the liberal intellectuals Miguel de Unamuno and Rodrigo Soriano escaped to Paris and began publishing criticisms of the dictatorship in Le Quotidien. Valencian novelist Vicente Blasco Ibáñez also signed a denunciation of Alfonso XIII and the military dictatorship. Rising opposition to the dictatorship made the guerrilla action seem more likely to succeed.

On 6 November 1924, the Revolutionary Committee initiated the operation. Spanish anarchists throughout France received telegrams calling them to action and they set off towards the France–Spain border in small armed groups. At the Gare d'Orsay, Ascaso coordinated the rail passage of revolutionaries from Paris, who boarded the train south with guns concealed in their suitcases. The first group of revolutionaries arrived at the Basque side of the border, between Hendaia and Bera, where they defeated a detachment of Carabineros. After marching through the mountains, they were ambushed by another and forced to retreat. Two of them were killed and others were arrested and taken to Iruña, where they were tried and executed.

18 hours later, another group of 1,000 revolutionaries arrived at Perpinyà, the capital of Northern Catalonia, where they were informed about the defeat at Bera. Many dispersed or were arrested by French police, leaving only 50 who escaped into the Pyrenees with the Winchester rifles and bullets. They met with a local guide, who was supposed to take them towards Figueres to carry out the prison break, but he informed them that several artillery and machine gun regiments were waiting for them at the border. Realising it would be impossible to make the crossing, the revolutionaries turned back, many leaving in tears. Meanwhile, in Barcelona, revolutionaries made their way to the Drassanes barracks, intending to free members of Los Solidarios who were imprisoned there. Police blocked the way of the revolutionaries and a shootout ensued, during which an officer was killed. The police subsequently surrounded the barracks with machine guns, preventing any entry. Revolutionaries were arrested and executed on the spot. The anarchists who were imprisoned in Drassanes committed suicide.

The insurrection was ultimately defeated. In the aftermath, Martínez Anido sent spies to France to spread conspiracy theories that it had been a false flag operation, while the Spanish government pressed their French counterparts to arrest and deport the exiled Spanish anarchists. By this time, many of the insurgents had already fled to Belgium or South America. The Revolutionary Committee sent Ricardo Sanz to Paris, where he informed Ascaso and Durruti of the defeat in Barcelona and suggested they go to Latin America to collect funds. As the militant group Los Errantes, Ascaso, Durruti and Gregorio Jover carried out a series of robberies in Latin America, before escaping back to Europe. By the end of 1924, most members of Los Solidarios had either been killed in combat with the authorities, arrested or driven into exile. Los Solidarios effectively stopped functioning as a cohesive group until the proclamation of the Second Spanish Republic, when its surviving members were reunited. In their absence, the CNT reorganised itself under the leadership of the Catalan syndicalist Joan Peiró. He oversaw the formation of an alliance with the Catalan nationalists led by Francesc Macià, which became the principal opposition to the Primo de Rivera dictatorship. The last leading member of Los Solidarios who had remained in Spain was Ricardo Sanz, but he was soon arrested while attempting to organise a prison break.

== Reorganisation ==
After the proclamation of the Second Spanish Republic on 14 April 1931, members of Los Solidarios were some of the first anarchist militants to return to Barcelona. Durruti, Ascaso, Liberto Callejas and Joaquín Cortés returned from their Belgian exile; Aurelio Fernández, Garcia Oliver and Torres Escartín were later released from prison. Despite the popular enthusiasm for the new regime, Los Solidarios believed that the Republic would be not fundamentally change the existing socio-economic order in Spain and that this would cause popular discontent among the working class. They thus called on anarchists to channel popular discontent against the government, raise class consciousness and prepare for a social revolution. Members of Los Solidarios frequently gave speeches before crowds of workers, stoking revolutionary sentiments.

In May 1931, after an International Workers' Day demonstration was suppressed by the newly established Catalan government, anarchist groups in Barcelona called a meeting to discuss how to respond. At this meeting, Los Solidarios discovered that a new group in Barcelona had taken their name during their absence. They subsequently reorganised themselves into a new affinity group, Nosotros, which called for a continuous practice of insurrection to foment a social revolution.

== Members ==
- Francisco Ascaso
- Buenaventura Durruti
- Rafael Torres Escartín
- Joan Garcia Oliver
- Aurelio Fernández Sánchez
- Ricardo Sanz García
- Alfonso Miguel
- Gregorio Suberviola
- Eusebio Brau
- Marcelino Manuel Campos
- Miguel García Vivancos
- Antonio Martín Escudero
- Juliana López
- María Luisa Tejedor
- Pepita Not
- Ramona Berni
- Maria Rius
- Antonio Ortiz Ramírez
- Gregorio Jover
- Domingo Ascaso

== Bibliography ==
- Bayer, Osvaldo (2015) [1975]. The Anarchist Expropriators: Buenaventura Durruti and Argentina's Working-Class Robin Hoods. AK Press. ISBN 978-1-84935-223-9. OCLC 908088288.
- Bookchin, Murray (1978). "The CNT". The Spanish Anarchists: The Heroic Years 1868–1936. Harper & Row. pp. 158–203. ISBN 0-06-090607-3. OCLC 802760467.
- Christie, Stuart (2008). We, the Anarchists: A Study of the Iberian Anarchist Federation (FAI). AK Press. ISBN 9781904859758. LCCN 2007939202. OCLC 260209091.
- Ealham, Chris (2005). "Mapping the working-class city". Class, Culture and Conflict in Barcelona 1898–1937. Routledge. pp. 21–48. ISBN 0-203-49355-9. OCLC 62076691.
- Gómez Casas, Juan (1986). Anarchist Organisation: The History of the F.A.I. Black Rose Books. ISBN 0-920057-40-3. OCLC 15252503.
- Kern, Robert W. (1978). Red Years/Black Years: A Political History of Spanish Anarchism, 1911-1937. Institute for the Study of Human Issues. ISBN 0-915980-54-1. LCCN 77-13595. OCLC 892242072.
- Paz, Abel (2006) [1996]. Durruti in the Spanish Revolution. Translated by Morse, Chuck. AK Press. ISBN 1-904859-50-X. LCCN 2006920974. OCLC 482919277.
