= María Luisa Tejedor =

Spanish anarchist activist

- Born: María Luisa Tejedor Gracia; 11 January 1906; Pina de Ebro, Aragon, Spain
- Other name: Marisa Tejedor
- Occupation: Dressmaker
- Years active: 1922–1936
- Organisation: Los Solidarios
- Movement: Anarchism in Spain
- Spouse: Arminio Guajardo Morandeira (m. 1931; died 1936)

María Luisa Tejedor Gracia (b. 1906) was a Spanish anarchist activist of the militant group Los Solidarios.

== Biography ==
María Luisa Tejedor Gracia was born in the Aragonese town of Pina de Ebro on 11 January 1906, and was the youngest of three children. She worked as a dressmaker. In the early 1920s, she met the Asturian anarchist activist Aurelio Fernández, who became her partner, and with whom she joined the anarchist militant group Los Solidarios. Tejedor was one of only a few women in the group, alongside Ramona Berni, Juliana López and Pepita Not.

In December 1926, Tejedor was arrested in Bilbao, following the repression of the Asturian anarchist movement by Lisardo Doval Bravo. She was transferred to a prison in Puente de Vallecas, Madrid, where she was accused of plotting to assassinate King Alfonso XIII. She was released on parole in 1928, and soon returned to anarchist militancy. In February 1931, Tejedor was sentenced by court martial to three years in prison.

By this time, she had met Arminio Guajardo Morandeira, a gynaecologist working at the provincial maternity hospital in Zaragoza. The two married, despite objections from Morandeira's father. After the proclamation of the Second Spanish Republic, the couple moved to Almarza, where Morandeira practiced medicine. Morandeira was arrested and imprisoned during the Revolution of 1934. Tejedor herself was suspected of participating in an anarchist insurrection and was forced into hiding, finding shelter with friends in Soria.

After her husband's release in March 1935, the couple returned to Almarza. After the outbreak of the Spanish Civil War, Tejedor's husband was executed by the Nationalists in Calatañazor, having been accused of participation in the Iberian Anarchist Federation. Tejedor subsequently moved to Barcelona, where in 1940, she formally registered his death. Her own birth was re-registered on 25 October 1945, as the original records had been destroyed during the civil war.

== Bibliography ==
- Christie, Stuart (2008). We, the Anarchists: A Study of the Iberian Anarchist Federation (FAI). AK Press. ISBN 9781904859758. LCCN 2007939202.
- García Francés, Kike (June 2017). "Justicieras, Solidarias y Nosotras: Las mujeres en los grupos de acción anarquistas". Rojo y Negro (in Spanish). No. 313. ISSN 1138-1019. Archived from the original on 3 December 2021.
- Íñiguez, Miguel (2001). "Tejedor, María Luisa". Esbozo de una enciclopedia histórica del anarquismo español (in Spanish). Madrid: Fundación de Estudios Libertarios Anselmo Lorenzo. p. 589. ISBN 9788486864453. OCLC 807322760.
- Martí Boscà, José Vicente (2017). "Arminio Guajardo Morandeira". Revista de Salud Ambiental (in Spanish). 17 (1): 109–118. ISSN 1697-2791.
