= Pepita Not =

Spanish Catalan anarchist militant (1897–1938)

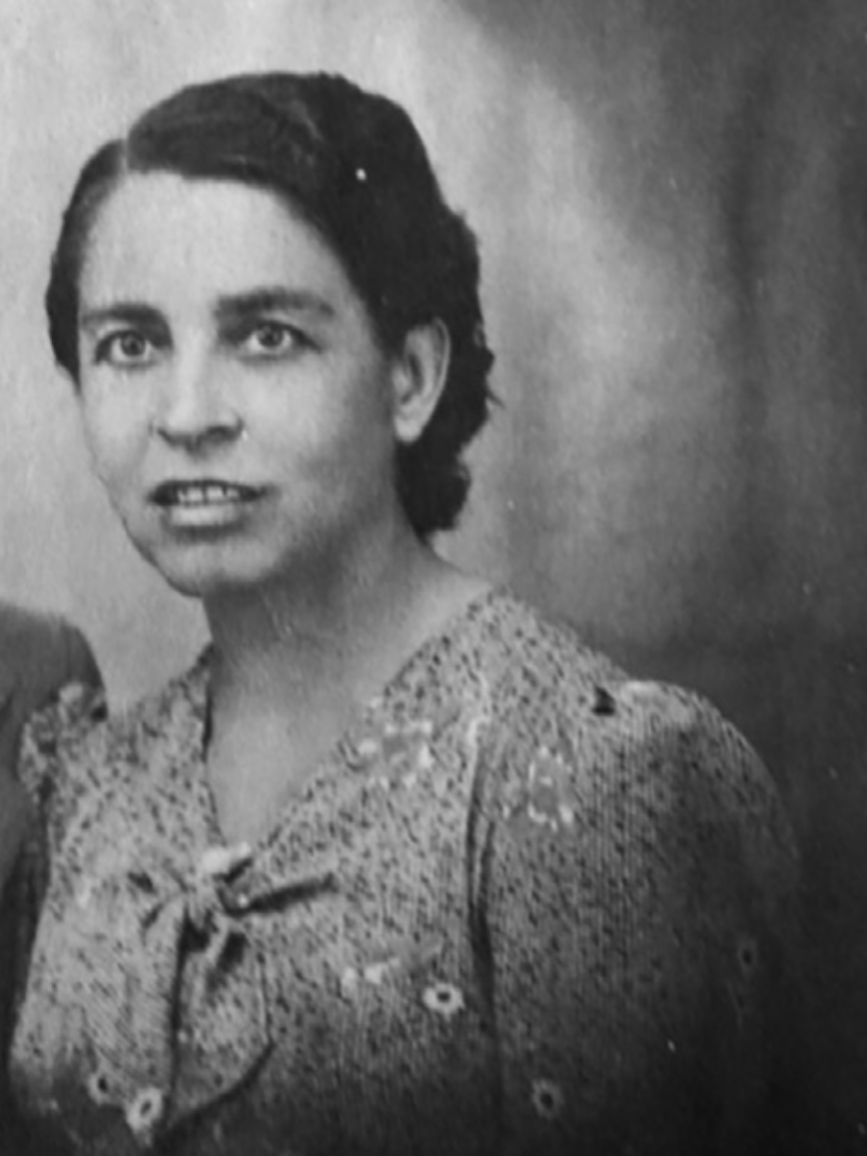
- Not in 1934
- Born: Josefa Not Bosch; 23 November 1897; Torregrossa, Catalonia, Spain
- Died: 4 June 1938 (aged 40); Barcelona, Catalonia, Spain
- Resting place: Montjuïc Cemetery
- Occupations: Maid, cook
- Organisation: Los Solidarios
- Movement: Anarchism
- Partner: Ricardo Sanz
- Children: 2
- Parents: Salvador Not Cases (father); Magdalena Bosch Lleonart (mother)

Josefa "Pepita" Not Bosch (23 November 1897 – 4 June 1938) was a Spanish Catalan anarchist activist. Born to a poor peasant family in the province of Lleida, she moved with her family to Barcelona, where she was forced to work as a housekeeper from an early age. She entered into a free union with the Valencian anarchist militant Ricardo Sanz and helped him hide from the police. During the dictatorship of Miguel Primo de Rivera, Not smuggled money, weapons and correspondence for the anarchist militant group Los Solidarios. After the proclamation of the Second Spanish Republic, she went into prisoner support activism. Following the outbreak of the Spanish Civil War, she fell gravely ill while pregnant with her second child and died from acute leukemia after giving birth.

== Early life ==
Josefa "Pepita" Not Bosch was born in the Catalan village of Torregrossa, on 23 November 1897. She was born into a family of poor peasants, and was the second of seven children. Her mother, Magdalena Bosch, died while she was still young. Her family subsequently moved to the Catalan capital of Barcelona. Pepita's father, Salvador Not, forced her to begin working at the age of 11. She was given a job as a maid and cook at the house of a wealthy French family on carrer de Balmes. The family forced her to work long hours without food, while her father kept most of her wages, which made her strongly dislike them both. The difficulties she faced at her job led her to join the National Confederation of Labour (CNT), an anarcho-syndicalist trade union federation, and to begin agitating for better conditions for disadvantaged workers. She was one of a few women who rose to prominence in the anarcho-syndicalist movement, who at a young age had moved from the province of Lleida to Barcelona, along with Ramona Berni, Soledad Estorach and Maria Rius.

== Activism ==
Towards the end of World War I, in early 1918, Not met the young Valencian trade unionist Ricardo Sanz at a carnaval and they quickly fell in love, beginning a relationship together. When the war ended, Catalonia experienced an economic crisis, leading to the Canadenca general strike and the outbreak of a civil conflict, during which several trade unionists were assassinated. Through Sanz, Not first became involved in the Spanish anarchist movement. During these years, she began working at the home of an Argentine family, who gave her much better working conditions including hours of free time, which allowed her to become closer to Sanz. She moved out of her own family home into his, where she was welcomed warmly. When Sanz was fired during an industrial dispute, he was able to rely on Not for support. As the civil conflict intensified, Sanz joined an anarchist militant group and was soon wanted by the police. With Not's help and support, he became a fugitive, going into hiding in his hometown. By the time he returned to Barcelona, Not had lost her job, as her employers had returned to Argentina and she decided to remain behind with Sanz. She was able to find work as a cook for another wealthy family, while Sanz worked at an iron foundry. With money from an indemnity from Sanz's former employer, they furnished their house, and in 1922, they entered into a free union with each other.

Following the establishment of the dictatorship of Miguel Primo de Rivera, in December 1923, Sanz was arrested and imprisoned by the new regime. While pregnant with their first child, Not continued working to support their family and brought her imprisoned partner food and clean clothes twice per week. She gave birth to their son, Floréal (named after the second month of spring in the French Republican calendar), in Lleida on 2 April 1924. She continued supporting Sanz during his five years of imprisonment, even as he was transferred from Barcelona to various prisons throughout the country. During this time, she joined the anarchist militant group Los Solidarios, which Sanz had co-founded in 1922 to resist political repression against the anarchist movement. Not was one of only a few women in the group, alongside Ramona Berni, Juliana López and María Luisa Tejedor. As she was unknown to the police, she was able to act with some amount of operational freedom. Together with Berni, she developed the group's communications and liaison network. She travelled around the country, smuggling money and weapons for the group, and handling their mail, which brought her to Aragon, Euskal Herria and Asturias, and then back to Catalonia. While continuing to work and care for her family, she carried out clandestine activism for the group, maintaining their lines of communication and distributing their propaganda throughout Barcelona. On one occasion, while she was still pregnant, she smuggled one million pesetas from a robbery in Asturias to Barcelona.

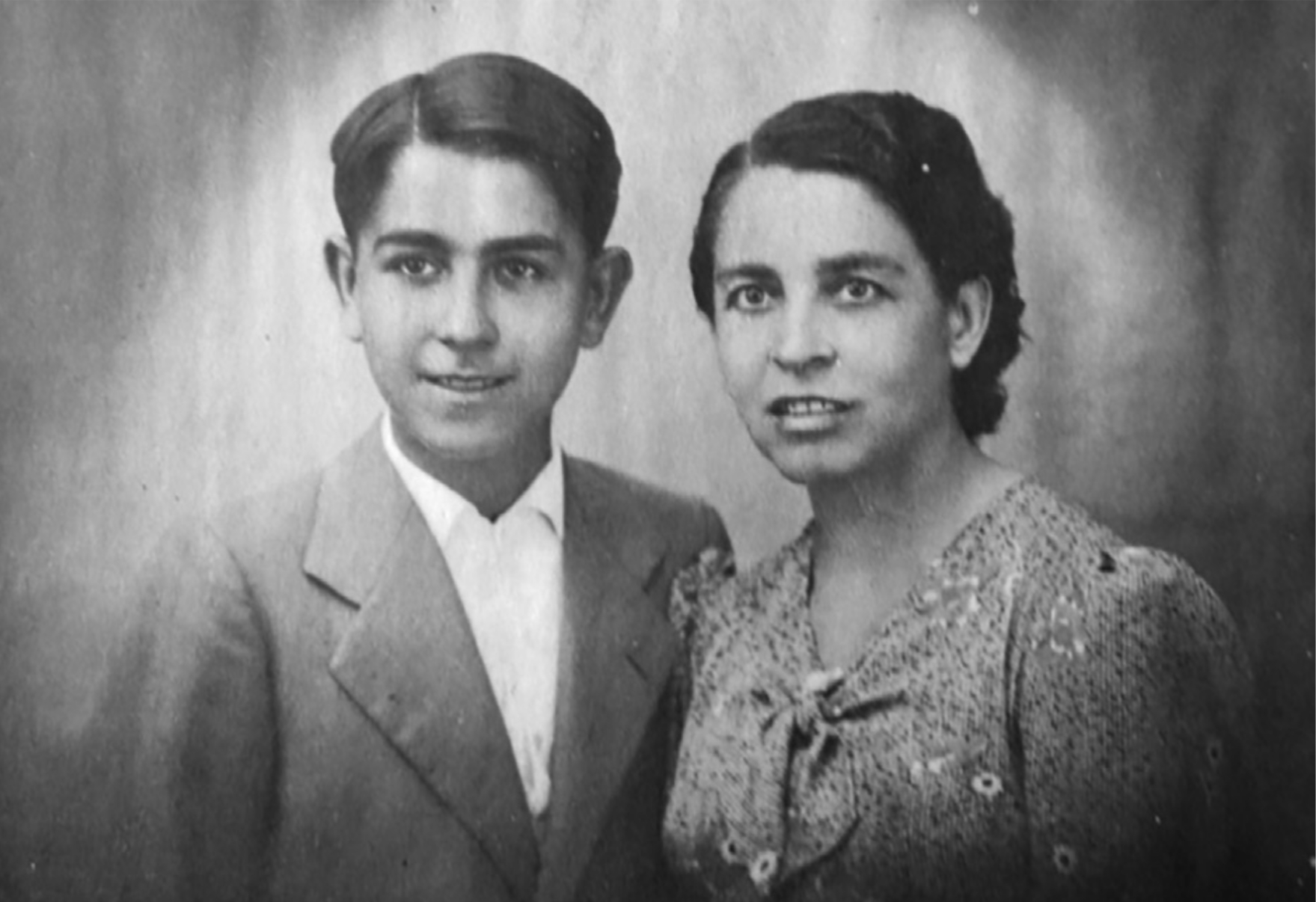
Not and her son Floréal in 1934

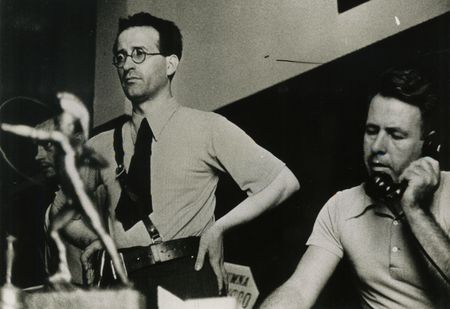
Ricardo Sanz (right) organising militia columns at the Pedralbes barracks

Following the fall of the dictatorship and the proclamation of the Second Spanish Republic in 1931, a general amnesty was declared, allowing many exiled and imprisoned members of Los Solidarios to return to their lives in Barcelona. Not quickly established contact with the returned activists and their partners, and when Sanz returned to the city, they moved into a flat in El Poblenou. Not then became involved in prisoner support activism, alongside Rosario Dolcet and Llibertat Ródenas. She agitated for better conditions for prisoners and visited them in order to find out what they needed, details on which she passed on to the prisoner support committee and their lawyers. According to Sanz, she led some of the group's "most dangerous missions", all while she continued working as a housekeeper. In December 1932, Not attended a meeting of the Nosotros group at Joan Garcia Oliver's house in Sants, where they laid out plans for the anarchist insurrection of January 1933. With the outbreak of the Spanish Civil War in July 1936, Not stayed at home to care for her son and partner, who was busy overseeing the formation of the confederal militias during the early months of the war. After the death of Buenaventura Durruti in November 1936, Sanz left home to assume command of the Durruti Column (later the 26th Division), leaving Not behind, pregnant with their second child. From their home in Poblenou, Not helped meet the needs of the family members of the combatants who fought under Sanz.

== Death ==
Not's second pregnancy was difficult, causing her health to deteriorate. Her situation was exacerbated by the constant bombardments of the city, which forced her to find refuge at a friend's house in Cerdanyola del Vallès, leaving her son in Barcelona to finish his secondary schooling. When she gave birth to her daughter, Violeta, on 1 January 1938, Not fell gravely ill. Sanz was not able to leave the front to visit his new daughter or his ailing partner. Following the Nationalists' Aragon Offensive, Sanz fell back to the Segre and had his family moved to the nearby city of Solsona. Not's health continued to deteriorate, forcing her to move back to Barcelona seeking urgent medical attention. She was diagnosed with acute leukemia and the doctors attempted to treat her, but it was too late.

Pepita Not died from her illness on 4 June 1938. Her obituary was published on the following day in Solidaridad Obrera by Joan Garcia Oliver, who remembered her as a kind and loyal anarchist militant who had "lived for others". At 11:00 on 7 June, her body was buried in the Montjuïc Cemetery; her funeral was attended by many anarchists, trade unionists, political and military officials, including Sanz. After Not's death, Sanz left Violeta in the care of Flora Barranco Garcia and sent Floréal to a French children's home while he continued fighting; Floréal would die in Bonnac on 26 January 1940. At the end of the civil war, Sanz fled over the border with Violeta. During the Nazi occupation of France, Sanz was interned in Camp Vernet then transferred to a concentration camp in Djelfa. After the liberation of France, he returned to France, married and had two more children with Josefina Martínez, and wrote a series of books about the civil war. He died on 25 October 1986.

== Bibliography ==
- Berger, Gonzalo (2022). Milicianas: La historia olvidada de las combatientes antifascistas [Militiawomen: The Forgotten History of the Anti-Fascist Female Fighters] (in Spanish). Arzalia Ediciones. ISBN 978-84-19018-15-1. OCLC 1350817821.
- Christie, Stuart (2008). We, the Anarchists: A Study of the Iberian Anarchist Federation (FAI). AK Press. ISBN 9781904859758. LCCN 2007939202. OCLC 260209091.
- Dupuy, Rolf (16 July 2012). "NOT, Josefa "PEPITA"". Dictionnaire international des militants anarchistes (in French). Archived from the original on 17 November 2025.
- Espílez Murciano, Felipe (7 February 2021). "Pepita Not". Encima de la Niebla (in Spanish). ISSN 2695-5245.
- Enzensberger, Hans Magnus (2018) [1972]. Anarchy's Brief Summer: The Life and Death of Buenaventura Durruti. Translated by Mitchell, Mike. Seagull Books. ISBN 9780857426000. OCLC 1077270536.
- Gallart Fernàndez, Felip; Lladonosa Giró, Vicent (2020). "Pepita Not i la lluita per la llibertat (1897-1938)" [Pepita Not and the Fight for Freedom (1897-1938)]. Mascançà: Revista d'estudis del Pla d'Urgell (in Catalan) (11): 57–65. ISSN 2014-4814. OCLC 1364859789.
- Gallart Fernàndez, Felip; Lladonosa Giró, Vicent; García Castilla, Diego (2020). Maria de Riu Berengué, lluitadora i miliciana anarcosindicalista [Maria de Riu Berengué, Anarcho-Syndicalist Fighter and Militiawoman]. Mosaic: XII Trobada d'Estudiosos de les Garrigues (in Catalan). Centre d’Estudis de les Garrigues. pp. 247–260. ISBN 978-8409-23716-6. OCLC 1583347553.
- García Francés, Kike (June 2017). "Justicieras, Solidarias y Nosotras: Las mujeres en los grupos de acción anarquistas" [Justicieras, Solidarias y Nosotras: Women in the Anarchist Action Groups]. Rojo y Negro (in Spanish). No. 313. ISSN 1138-1019. OCLC 802904120. Archived from the original on 3 December 2021.
- Íñiguez, Miguel (2001). "Not, Pepita". Esbozo de una enciclopedia histórica del anarquismo español (in Spanish). Madrid: Fundación de Estudios Libertarios Anselmo Lorenzo. p. 436. ISBN 9788486864453. OCLC 807322760.
- Paz, Abel (2006) [1996]. Durruti in the Spanish Revolution. Translated by Morse, Chuck. Edinburgh: AK Press. ISBN 1-904859-50-X. LCCN 2006920974. OCLC 482919277.
- Pous i Porta, Joan; Solé i Sabaté, Josep Maria (1991). Anarquia i república a la Cerdanya [Anarchy and Republic in Cerdanya] (in Catalan). L'Abadia de Montserrat. ISBN 84-7826-212-1. OCLC 1152816894.
