= Gregorio Suberviola =

Navarrese anarchist

- Born: Gregorio Suberviola Baigorri; 9 May 1896; Morentin, Navarre, Spain
- Died: 13 March 1924 (aged 27); Barcelona, Catalonia, Spain
- Other names: "El Serio", "El Torinto"
- Organizations: Los Justicieros (1920–1922); Los Solidarios (1922–1924)
- Movement: Anarchism in Spain
- Relatives: Fortunato Suberviola (brother)

Gregorio Suberviola Baigorri (9 May 1896 – 13 March 1924) was a Navarrese anarchist militant.

== Biography ==
Gregorio Suberviola Baigorri was born in the Navarrese town of Morentin, on 9 May 1896. He worked alongside his father as a bricklayer in his home town until 1919. He then carried out his military service in Lizarra. He then became a migrant worker, moving to Pamplona and then Zaragoza. During this period, he joined the anarcho-syndicalist movement, within which he became known as "El Serio" and "El Torinto". He then moved to San Sebastián, where he worked on the construction of the Kursaal casino and organised itinerant workers alongside Manuel Buenacasa.

In 1920, he co-founded the anarchist group Los Justicieros with Buenaventura Durruti. The group attempted to assassinate King Alfonso XIII, but after their plot was uncovered, they fled to Zaragoza. Under police surveillance, Suberviola returned to work, while spending his free time reading anarchist theory. In August 1922, he and Durruti moved to Barcelona, where they established a new group, Los Solidarios. In May 1923, he assassinated the governor of Biscay, Fernando González Regueral, and in September 1923, he participated in a bank robbery against the Bank of Spain in Xixón.

When the dictatorship of Primo de Rivera was established in 1923, Los Solidarios resolved to overthrow the new dictator. Suberviola acquired weapons and explosives, and stored them in various neighbourhoods throughout Barcelona, but police informants alerted the authorities about Suberviola's arms depots. On 24 February 1924, Suberviola was fatally wounded in a raid on his home by pistoleros. He died of his wounds on 13 March 1924.
