= Aurelio Fernández =

Aurelio Fernandez may refer to:

- Aurelio Fernández Sánchez (1897–1974), Asturian anarchist
- Aurélio Fernández Miguel (born 1964), Brazilian judoka
