= Ramona Berni =

Spanish anarchist militant

Ramona Berni i Toldrà
- Born: 3 June 1887; Mollerussa
- Died: 22 April 1968 (aged 80); Barcelona
- Occupations: Textile worker, militiawoman
- Movement: Anarchism

Ramona Berni i Toldrà (3 June 1887, Mollerussa – 22 April 1968, Barcelona) was a Spanish anarcho-syndicalist militant from Catalonia.

== Biography ==
She was born to a family of peasants from Pla d'Urgell. She was the daughter of Isabel Toldrà i Ginesta and Ramón Berni i Buria and she had two sisters.

In the 1910s she moved to Barcelona where she worked in the textile industry and joined the Manufacturing and Textile Union of the Confederación Nacional del Trabajo (CNT), being one of the main propagandists of the union together with her friend Pepita Not. In 1918 she met Ricardo Sanz García, Pepita's future partner and union leader. At the end of the 1910s, Berni married Blas Buyé and had a son. She got a divorce in 1933.

In 1923, with Pepita Not and Ricardo Sanz, she joined the group Los Solidarios, created as a defense against the gunmen of the Sindicato Libre. This group (Los Solidarios) was made up of Buenaventura Durruti, Juan García Oliver, Francisco Ascaso, Eusebio Brau, Julia López Mainar, María Luisa Tejedor, and others. In the group she had recruitment, liaison and communication responsibilities. Although Berni was never imprisoned for her membership in the group, she was arrested, along with her son Jaume Buyé i Berni, by the police on February 28, 1924, after the murder of Los Solidarios leader Gregorio Suberbiela, for which she remained at the disposal of the military authority for a few weeks. During the dictatorship of Primo de Rivera, the group was reduced to four members who remained at large, including Berni, dealing with different actions such as the transfer of weapons acquired in Éibar to Barcelona.

After the proclamation of the Second Spanish Republic, she continued her trade union activity, and participated in several CNT meetings in Igualada (1931), Lleida and Canet de Mar (1932).

After the Alt Llobregat insurrection, she settled in Manresa (according to some sources in 1934, others in 1936), where she worked as a textile worker. During the Spanish Civil War the factory she worked in was collectivized and she held the position of union representative. She also collaborated in the Manresa City Council, being on the payroll of the Department of Internal Security. Her last public appearance was at a rally at the Kursaal in Manresa in 1938. At the end of the civil war, she went into exile, perhaps in France, although there is no record of her passing through any of the French concentration camps.

She died in Barcelona on 22 April 1968, although, according to some sources, there are doubts about both the date of her birth and the date of her death.

== See also ==
- Anarchism in Spain
