= Ascaso =

Ascaso could refer to:

- village of Ascaso in Spain's Province of Huesca
- Ascaso Factory, a Barcelona-based Spanish espresso machine and horeca manufacturer, established in 1961
- Francisco Ascaso, anarcho-syndicalist figure active during the Spanish Civil War
