= Antonio Martín Escudero =

Spanish anarchist and militiaman

- Born: 17 January 1895; Belvís de Monroy, Cáceres
- Died: 27 April 1937 (aged 42); Bellver de Cerdanya, Lleida, Catalonia
- Occupations: Construction worker, shoemaker, militiaman
- Movement: Anarchism

Antonio Martín Escudero (17 January 1895 in Belvís de Monroy, Cáceres – 27 April 1937 in Bellver de Cerdanya, Lleida), also known as El Cojo de Málaga (The cripple of Malaga), was an anarchist syndicalist and militiaman.

He was known as El Cojo de Málaga due to the limp caused by a bone disease in his right leg and in analogy with Joaquín José Vargas Soto, a flamenco singer also known as El Cojo de Málaga.

== Biography ==
=== Introduction to the anarchist movement ===
The son of emigrants to Catalonia, he came into contact with the Los Solidarios group in Barcelona in 1922, to face the dirty war carried out against the labor movement by the civil governor of Barcelona, Martínez Anido, and the bosses' gunmen. The following year, after the coup d'état of Primo de Rivera in Spain, he settled in Puigcerdà (capital of Cerdanya) as a delegate of the Confederación Nacional del Trabajo (CNT) to collaborate in the smuggling of weapons for the fight against the dictatorship.

=== Exile in France ===
In 1924, due to his illness, he went to France until 1934, maintaining contact with other members of Los Solidarios, such as Durruti. He worked as a shoemaker in Paris. In Aubervilliers he had a daughter, Florida Martín Sanmartín. There he also worked in construction and later in a garage.

=== Return to Spain ===
He returned to Spain in 1934, settling in Cerdanya and working as a bricklayer while staying an active member of the CNT. In 1936 he attended the Zaragoza CNT congress as a delegate.

During the Spanish Civil War he presided over the Puigcerdà Committee. He tried to impose fair prices and avoid the speculation of the owners, to provide food in times of famine. In these times the legend of the cripple man from Malaga was forged, as the owners of Bellver did not see price regulation favorably. He also avoided another lucrative activity: the clandestine passage of people across the border, an operation through which Estat Català and Esquerra Republicana de Catalunya received significant amounts of money.

Another of Martín's objectives was to collectivize the livestock production of Cerdanya in Puigcerdà to supply the front, but he was faced with rejection of the measure by some farmers of Bellver, led by mayor and big land owner Joan Solé.

Some sources accused him of having ordered numerous executions in Collada de Tosens, with more than fifty dead in that area. However, more recent historiography has denied his alleged responsibility for these deaths.

=== Death ===
On 27 April 1937, Antonio Martín and Julio Fortuny, from Seu d'Urgell, and two other militants, were killed in an ambush in Bellver.
