= Juliana López =

Aragonese anarchist militant (1886–1971)

- Born: Juliana López Mainar; 1886; Zaragoza, Spain
- Died: 1971 (aged 84–85); Zaragoza, Spain
- Organizations: Los Justicieros; Los Solidarios
- Movement: Anarchism in Spain
- Criminal charges: Accessory to murder
- Criminal penalty: Six years imprisonment
- Parents: Manuel López Duche (father); Joaquina Mainar Alvira (mother)

Juliana López Mainar (Note: Sometimes known by the first name "Julia"; matrilineal surname sometimes spelled "Maimar".) (1886–1971) was an Aragonese anarchist militant.

== Biography ==
Juliana López Mainar was born in the Aragonese capital of Zaragoza. She was a cook by trade. López ran a guest house on Calle Arnaldo Alcober, in the Magdalena neighbourhood of Zaragoza. There she provided refuge for fugitive anarchists and became well known within the Aragonese anarchist movement.

In February 1921, she joined the anarchist group Los Justicieros. The group dispatched her and Buenaventura Durruti to contact other Spanish anarchist groups, with the goal of creating an Iberian Anarchist Federation. They first went to Andalusia, where they convinced local anarchists to federate together on a regional basis. They then travelled to Madrid, but were forced to leave the city following the assassination of prime minister Eduardo Dato. They finally went to Barcelona, where Domingo Ascaso informed them of the dangers faced by the local movement, preventing them from coordinating with other anarchist groups.

Concerned that pistolerismo may make its way to Zaragoza, Los Justicieros went to the Basque Country to acquire weapons. To pay for the guns, they carried out an armed robbery against a paymaster in Eibar, making off with 300,000 pesetas. They divided the money into two parts, half of which was sent to Bilbao, and the other half of which López took back to Zaragoza.

In June 1923, she was implicated in the assassination of Archbishop Juan Soldevila. Two members of Los Solidarios, Francisco Ascaso and Rafael Torres Escartín, had met at her guest house on the day of the attack. The Catholic Church pushed the authorities to arrest her as an accomplice. Her guest house was subsequently searched by police, and she and her family were investigated. She was charged for the attack, alongside Ascaso, Torres Escartín and Esteban Euterio Salamero Bernard. López was ultimately sentenced to six years in prison. During her imprisonment, she was transferred between prisons in Alcalá de Henares and Zaragoza; in 1926, she contracted tuberculosis. She was released in 1928.

In December 1932, she reunited with members of Los Solidarios in Barcelona to plan the anarchist insurrection of January 1933. During the years of the Francoist dictatorship, she ran a small business in the Almozara neighbourhood of Zaragoza, where all her neighbours knew of her militant past.

== Bibliography ==
- García Francés, Kike (June 2017). "Justicieras, Solidarias y Nosotras: Las mujeres en los grupos de acción anarquistas". Rojo y Negro (in Spanish). No. 313. ISSN 1138-1019.
- Íñiguez, Miguel (2001). "López Mainar, Juliana". Esbozo de una enciclopedia histórica del anarquismo español (in Spanish). Madrid: Fundación de Estudios Libertarios Anselmo Lorenzo. p. 343. ISBN 9788486864453. OCLC 807322760.
- Paz, Abel (2006) [1996]. Durruti in the Spanish Revolution. Translated by Morse, Chuck. Edinburgh: AK Press. ISBN 1-904859-50-X. LCCN 2006920974. OCLC 482919277.
