= Aurelio Fernández Sánchez =

Spanish politician (1897–1974)

Minister of Health and Social Welfare of Catalunya
- In office 16 April 1937 – 5 May 1937
- President: Lluis Companys
- Prime Minister: Joan Casanovas i Maristany
- Preceded by: Josep Juan i Domènech
- Succeeded by: Valeri Mas i Casas

Personal details
- Born: 1897 Oviedo, Asturias, Spain
- Died: 1974 (aged 76–77) Puebla, Mexico
- Citizenship: Spain
- Party: FAI

Aurelio Fernández Sánchez (Asturias, 1897 – Mexico, 1974) was an Asturian anarchist.

== Biography ==
Aurelio Fernández Sánchez joined the National Confederation of Labor (Spanish: Confederación Nacional del Trabajo CNT) in his youth. He participated in the Spanish general strike of 1917, and had to hide in Logroño and Zaragoza. He joined the anarchist group Los Solidarios in 1922, with which he took part in an assault on the Bank of Spain in Gijón in September 1923. He also planned the assassination of Severiano Martínez Anido, the civil governor of Barcelona. During the dictatorship of Miguel Primo de Rivera he was imprisoned in March 1924 in Barcelona, but he escaped and fled to France. He returned to Spain in 1926 but was arrested at the end of the year and imprisoned in Bilbao along with his companion María Luisa Tejedor. During the years of the Second Spanish Republic, he stood out as one of the leaders of the Iberian Anarchist Federation (FAI), and for being a supporter of the anarchist insurrections in January 1932, January 1933 and December 1933.

In July 1936, after the outbreak of the Spanish Civil War, he joined the Central Committee of Antifascist Militias of Catalonia (CCMA) as a representative of the FAI, assuming direction of the Research Department. (Note: From this position Aurelio Fernández pressed for Frederic Escofet to step down from command of Public Order in Catalonia, as the latter sought to immediately control the "excesses" of the FAI.) From that position, he supervised the actions undertaken by the Control Patrols, and also authorized the assault on the prison ship Uruguay during which several right-wing prisoners were executed. Joan Pons Garlandí (ERC) denounced the control patrols for their actions. (Note: After the assassination of 14 Marists in July 1936, Marist leaders met with Aurelio Fernández and Dionís Eroles and paid a ransom of 200,000 francs for the surviving members. When Fernández received the first half on 4 October, 117 young Marists were allowed to cross the border into France, but all those over 21 years of age were arrested – 107 were imprisoned in St. Elias. When the adjutant of the order arrived in Barcelona with the second payment, he was also imprisoned and the money for Aurelio Fernández was taken from him. 46 of the prisoners were killed that night. When the Generalitat learned of the case, Lluis Companys ordered the release of the 62 Marists that were still alive.)

When the CCMA was replaced by the new Internal Security Board, Fernández continued as head of the control patrols when he was appointed general secretary of the new body. After he was violently confronted by the police chief Andreu Rebertés (ERC), in late November 1936, he accused Rebertés of conspiracy against the Generalitat, then arrested and killed him. Rebertés' replacement was the PSUC militant Eusebio Rodríguez, who was also entrusted with the same goal. In a meeting in the office of the Minister of Homeland Security, Aurelio Fernández attacked Rodríguez to the point that the minister Artemi Aiguader i Miró had to shoot him with a pistol to stop him. As a member of the Junta, Aurelio went to La Fatarella in January 1937, where peasants resisted the collectivizing expropriation of their lands pushed by the anarchists, and under his observation the FAI militias executed 30 peasants and sacked the town. He also acted as Minister of Health and Social Welfare of the Generalitat between 16 April and 5 May 1937.

The May events of 1937 allowed the Generalitat and the Republic to regain control of the institutions and public order. Fernández fiercely resisted the new security delegate, a part of the republican state's police force, but was eventually imprisoned. A major investigation was then launched into the murders and robberies committed between July 1936 and May 1937: Aurelio Fernández was prosecuted for fraud and extortion. Finally, he was imprisoned for being the alleged inducer of the frustrated attack against the president of the Barcelona Court Josep Andreu i Abelló.

He later went into exile in France with Joan García Oliver and then went on to Mexico, where he died in 1974.

== Bibliography ==
- Preston, Paul (2012). The Spanish Holocaust. London: HarperPress. ISBN 978-0-00-638695-7. OCLC 1160070340.
- Romero Salvadó, Francisco J. (2013). Historical Dictionary of the Spanish Civil War. Scarecrow Press. ISBN 978-0-8108-8009-2.
- Ansó, Mariano (1976). Yo fui ministro de Negrín. Memorias ineludibles (in Spanish). Planeta. ISBN 84-320-5621-9.
