= Domingo Ascaso Abadía =

Spanish trade unionist (1895–1937)

- Born: 10 June 1895; Almudévar, Hoya de Huesca, Spain
- Died: 4 May 1937 (aged 41); Barcelona, Catalonia, Spain
- Cause of death: Assassination
- Resting place: Montjuïc Cemetery
- Occupation: Anarcho-syndicalist
- Organization: CNT
- Family: Francisco Ascaso Abadía (brother), Alejandro Ascaso Abadía (brother), Joaquín Ascaso Budría (cousin)

Domingo Ascaso Abadía (10 June 1895 – 4 May 1937) was an Aragonese anarchist and trade union leader, brother of Francisco Ascaso Abadía and cousin of Joaquín Ascaso Budria.

== Biography ==
He worked as a baker in Zaragoza, where he soon became joined an anarchist direct action group, being credited with participating in 1920 in the assassination of the editor of the Heraldo de Aragón, who was accused of betraying insurgent soldiers in the Carmen barracks. In 1921 he settled with his brother in Barcelona, where he was first part of Los Justicieros and in October 1922 joined Los Solidarios, where he met Buenaventura Durruti.

When the Dictatorship of Primo de Rivera was proclaimed, he was persecuted (according to some for having participated in the murder of a police commissioner) and hid in the Poblenou cemetery until Juan García Oliver helped him evade the Barcelona police and flee to France. There he was reunited with Durruti and his brother Francisco, who were planning a guerrilla action in the Pyrenees. In December 1924 they organized an expedition to Bera, but it failed. In 1929 he settled in Brussels, where he lived by selling handkerchiefs and stationery. When the Second Spanish Republic was proclaimed, he returned to Barcelona and joined the group Los indomables of the Iberian Anarchist Federation (FAI). Under the Law of Defense of the Republic he was arrested and on 21 January 1932 exiled to Villa Cisneros, on charges of having participated in the Alt Llobregat insurrection. He was granted amnesty in September 1932, he then worked as a pastry chef and as a delegate for the National Confederation of Labor (CNT).

When the Spanish coup of July 1936 took place, Ascaso took part in the assault on the shipyard barracks. During the Spanish Civil War he was an assistant to Juan Garcia Oliver in the Committee of Antifascist Militias and marched to the Aragon front, where he was head of the Columna Ascaso, taking places such as Barbastro, Grañén and Vicién. When the Ascaso Column was transformed into the 28th Division in early 1937, he left command and returned to Barcelona. He was assassinated during the Barcelona May Days and was buried in the Montjuïc cemetery.

== Bibliography ==
- García Oliver, Juan (1978). El eco de los pasos (in Spanish). París: Ruedo Ibérico. ISBN 84-85361-06-7.
- Martínez de Sas, María Teresa; Pagès, Pelai, eds. (2000). Diccionari biogràfic del moviment obrer als Països Catalans (in Catalan). L'Abadia de Montserrat. ISBN 9788484152439.
- Paz, Abel (1996). Durruti en la revolución española (in Spanish). Madrid: Fundación de Estudios Libertarios Anselmo Lorenzo. ISBN 84-86864-21-6.
- Romero Salvadó, Francisco J. (2013). Historical Dictionary of the Spanish Civil War. Rowman & Littlefield. ISBN 9780810857841.
