= Rafael Torres Escartín =

(1901–1939) Spanish anarchist militant

- Born: 20 December 1901; Bailo, Huesca, Kingdom of Spain
- Died: 1939 (aged 37–38); Barcelona, Catalonia, Spain
- Cause of death: Firing squad
- Occupations: Baker, militant
- Organization(s): CNT, Los Solidarios
- Movement: Anarchism

Rafael Liberato Torres Escartín (20 December 1901 – 1939) was a Spanish anarchist militant.

== Biography ==
The son of Pedro Torres Marco and Orencia Escartín Villacampa, Rafael was born in the Bailo barracks of Guardia Civil, where his father was stationed.

As a student in Huesca, he was introduced to anarchism by the anarchist painter and journalist Ramón Acín. He dropped out of school to become a pastry chef. From 1918 he was a member of Confederación Nacional del Trabajo (CNT), specifically in the food union, and left Huesca to live in Zaragoza.

In Zaragoza he joined the anarchist group Crisol, that would later be called Los Solidarios, made up of prominent figures in anarchism such as Buenaventura Durruti or Francisco Ascaso. He lived for a while between the Aragonese capital and Barcelona, where he worked at the Ritz Hotel.

In 1923, the group Los Solidarios affirmed that Cardinal Juan Soldevila y Romero, the civil governor of Barcelona Severiano Martínez Anido and the minister of the interior Gabino Bugallal Araújo had ordered the assassination of trade union leader Salvador Seguí in Barcelona on 10 March that year. With this conviction, they decided to assassinate the Cardinal Archbishop of Zaragoza. On 4 June, Rafael Torres Escartín, together with Francisco Ascaso, assassinated the cardinal with twenty shots in his car, leaving his driver seriously injured.

Although at first he managed to flee from the police, Torres Escartín was arrested during a robbery at the Bank of Spain in Gijón and despite the fact that he managed to escape again, he was again arrested and sentenced to death. As a result, Torres Escartín went mad during his stay in the Santoña prison, and his sentence was commuted to an insane asylum in Reus in 1931. Despite his mental state, Rafael was executed by a firing squad at the end of the Spanish Civil War in 1939.
