= Maria Rius =

Catalan activist (1909–1970)

- Born: Maria de Riu Berengué; 30 November 1909; Arbeca, Lleida, Spain
- Died: c. 1970 (aged 60–61); France
- Occupations: Seamstress, activist
- Organisation: National Confederation of Labour
- Other political affiliations: Los Solidarios
- Movement: Anarchism, prisoners' rights
- Military career
- Allegiance: Spanish Republic
- Service: Confederal militias (1936–1937); Spanish Republican Army (1937–1939)
- Units: Hilario-Zamora Column (1936–1937); 116th Mixed Brigade; (1937–1939)
- Conflicts: Spanish Civil War; Battle of Barcelona; Aragon front

Maria Rius (1909–c. 1970) was a Catalan prisoner support activist and anarchist militant. She organised numerous prison escapes during the time of the dictatorship of Primo de Rivera. After the proclamation of the Second Spanish Republic, she stormed a women's prison in Barcelona and agitated for amnesty for political prisoners. She fought on the Aragon front during the Spanish Civil War, before fleeing into exile in France.

== Biography ==
Maria Rius was born in the Catalan village of Arbeca in 1909. She was raised by working-class parents, who could not afford to pay for her education. She herself entered the workforce at the age of nine, beginning with an apprenticeship as a shirtwaist maker. She and her family later moved to Barcelona, where she joined the growing anarchist movement. At the age of 18, she joined the National Confederation of Labour (CNT), becoming the first member of its dressmakers' union. She was also active in prisoner support, provided refuge for anarchist fugitives and organised prison escapes.

Rius also joined the anarchist militant group Los Solidarios. In 1924, police found explosives and firearms in her home; she was arrested and sentenced to eight years' imprisonment. Rius continued organising escapes from prison, until she was identified by the authorities. She herself then escaped and fled to France. Following the fall of the dictatorship of Primo de Rivera, she returned to prisoner support activism in Barcelona, agitating for amnesty for imprisoned women. Following the proclamation of the Second Spanish Republic, on 14 April 1931, she led the storming of the Queen Amalia Prison. She freed many imprisoned women and burned the prison's records, before leading the liberated women to the Republican demonstration on the Plaça Sant Jaume. She then participated in a commission which appealed to Catalan President Francesc Macià for all politics prisoners in Figueres and Barcelona to be released.

With the outbreak of the Spanish Civil War, Rius became a militiawoman and participated in the streetfighting against the July 1936 military uprising in Barcelona. She then went to the Aragon front, where she joined up with the Hilario-Zamora Column in Sástago. In March 1937, she took part in the capture of Quinto. She later joined the 116th Mixed Brigade of the Spanish Republican Army. With the victory of the Nationalists' Catalonia Offensive in 1939, Rius fled to France. She retired from activism and, for the rest of her life, she focused on her family. She died in French exile, c. 1970.

== Bibliography ==
- Christie, Stuart (2008). We, the Anarchists: A Study of the Iberian Anarchist Federation (FAI). AK Press. ISBN 9781904859758. LCCN 2007939202. OCLC 260209091.
- Íñiguez, Miguel (2001). "Rius, María". Esbozo de una enciclopedia histórica del anarquismo español (in Spanish). Madrid: Fundación de Estudios Libertarios Anselmo Lorenzo. pp. 515–516. ISBN 9788486864453. OCLC 807322760.
- Marin Silvestre, Dolors (5 October 2010). "Maria Rius". Diccionari Biogràfic de Dones (in Catalan).
- Ruíz Casero, Luis Antonio (2019). "La participación de la mujer en primera línea en el Ejército Popular de la República (1936-1939)". In Torija, Alicia; Morín, Jorge (eds.). Mujeres en la Guerra Civil y la Posguerra: Memoria y Educación (in Spanish). Audema. pp. 139–178. ISBN 978-84-16450-49-7.
