= Sindicatos Libres =

Defunct Spanish trade union

Sindicatos Libres (Sindicats Lliures)
- Founded: October 10, 1919
- Dissolved: 1931
- Headquarters: Barcelona
- Location: Spain
- Members: ≈200,000 (ca. 1929)
- Publication: Union Obrera

The Sindicatos Libres (Spanish for "Free Trade Unions"; Catalan: Sindicats Lliures) was a Spanish company union born in Barcelona, Catalonia. It was established by Carlist workers, and remained active during the early interwar period (the late stages of Restoration Spain) as a counterweight to the anarcho-syndicalist Confederación Nacional del Trabajo. The group aided employers take action against striking unionists, and was thus criticized as a "yellow union" with proto-fascist leanings; however, its regular members were in practice freely moving between right- and left-wing unionism. The Sindicatos lost momentum during the dictatorship of Miguel Primo de Rivera, and eventually dissolved when the Second Spanish Republic was proclaimed.

== History ==
They Sindicatos Libres were founded on 10 October 1919 in Barcelona, during a time of severe and violent class conflict between employers and workers in the city, with the practice of "pistolerismo" widespread. With employers feeling that the Spanish Police and Army were inefficient in their attempts to stop left-wing agitation, they sponsored the growth of the Sindicatos, seeking to use them as violent militia groups. Formed by highly conservative Catholic workers, they took on some of the features of a yellow union as employer subsidies to the groups grew.

Vilified by anarcho-syndicalist rivals as strikebreaking thugs, the Sindicatos Libres sided with the Spanish Police in the 1920−1922 period, when Civil Governor Severiano Martínez Anido and Chief of Police Miguel Arlegui unleashed a campaign of state terror against trade unionists. Aside from a small Carlist core, their militancy was not particularly ideological, with members often returning to the Confederación Nacional del Trabajo. They reached 150,000 members in the 1920–21 period. However, as strike action declined in 1921 and beyond so too did the influence of the Sindicatos Libres as their violent activity became of less value to the employers.

During the dictatorship of Primo de Rivera (1923–30), Sindicatos expanded outside of Barcelona; towards the end of the 1920s their membership stood at around 200,000. However, Primo de Rivera's laws against the anarcho-syndicalists and other leftist groups again meant that the group were less essential for the street battles than they had been.

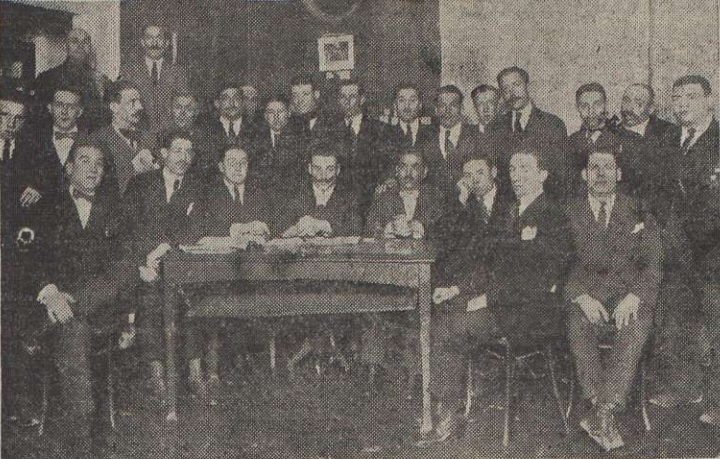
Presidents of the Sindicatos Libres (1922)

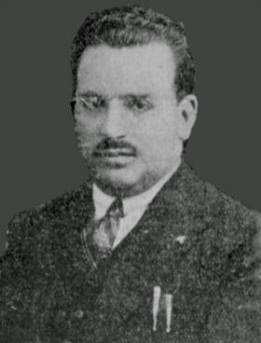
Ramón Sales, a leader of the Sindicatos Libres

The group initially espoused a sort of heterodox Carlism with potentially revolutionary undertones, but as they progressively lost the traditionalist tenets of Carlism, Colin M. Winston argues that they evolved into a first strand of Spanish fascism. The Confederación Nacional de Sindicatos Libres ("National Confederation of Free Trade Unions") dissolved right after the proclamation of the Second Republic in 1931.

== Bibliography ==
- Canal, Jordi (2006). Banderas blancas, boinas rojas: una historia política del carlismo, 1876-1939 (in Spanish). Madrid: Marcial Pons Historia. ISBN 84-96467-34-1.
- Ealham, Chris (2005). Class, Culture and Conflict in Barcelona 1898–1937. London and New York: Routledge. ISBN 0-203-57252-1.
- Mann, Michael (2004). Fascists. Cambridge: Cambridge University Press. ISBN 0-521-53855-6.
- Sanz Hoya, Julián (2006). De la resistencia a la reacción: las derechas frente a la Segunda República (Cantabria, 1931-1936): De la resistencia a la reacción. Las derechas frente a la Segunda República. Santander: Universidad de Cantabria. ISBN 84-8102-420-1.
- Winston, Colin M. (1982). "The Proletarian Carlist Road to Fascism: Sindicalismo Libre". Journal of Contemporary History. 17 (4). SAGE: 557–585. doi:10.1177/002200948201700401. ISSN 0022-0094. JSTOR 260522. S2CID 159516428.
