= Morentin =

Municipality of Spain

Coordinates: 42°36′51″N 2°00′45″W

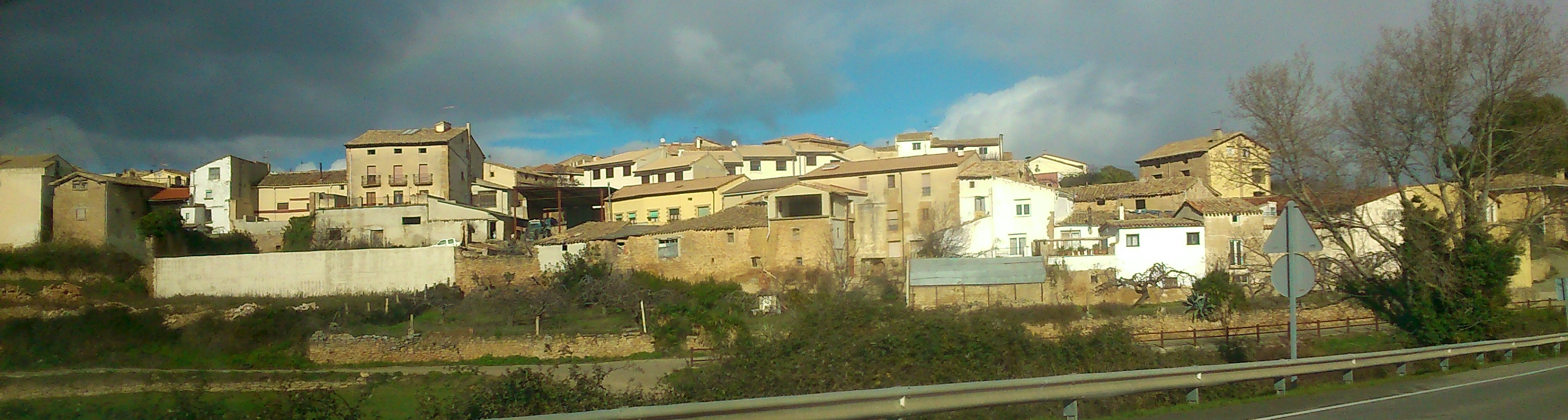
Partial view of Morentin

Morentin is a town and municipality located in the province and autonomous community of Navarre, northern Spain.
