= Belvís de Monroy =

Coordinates: 39°49′08″N 5°36′32″W

Belvís de Monroy, Spain
- Coat of arms
- Interactive map of Belvís de Monroy, Spain
- Country: Spain
- Autonomous community: Extremadura
- Province: Cáceres
- Municipality: Belvís de Monroy

Area
  - Total: 44 km^{2} (17 sq mi)

Population (2025-01-01)
  - Total: 774
  - Density: 18/km^{2} (46/sq mi)
- Time zone: UTC+1 (CET)
  - Summer (DST): UTC+2 (CEST)
- Website: http://www.belvis.org

Belvís de Monroy is a municipality located in the province of Cáceres, Extremadura, Spain. According to the 2006 census (INE), the municipality had a population of 701.

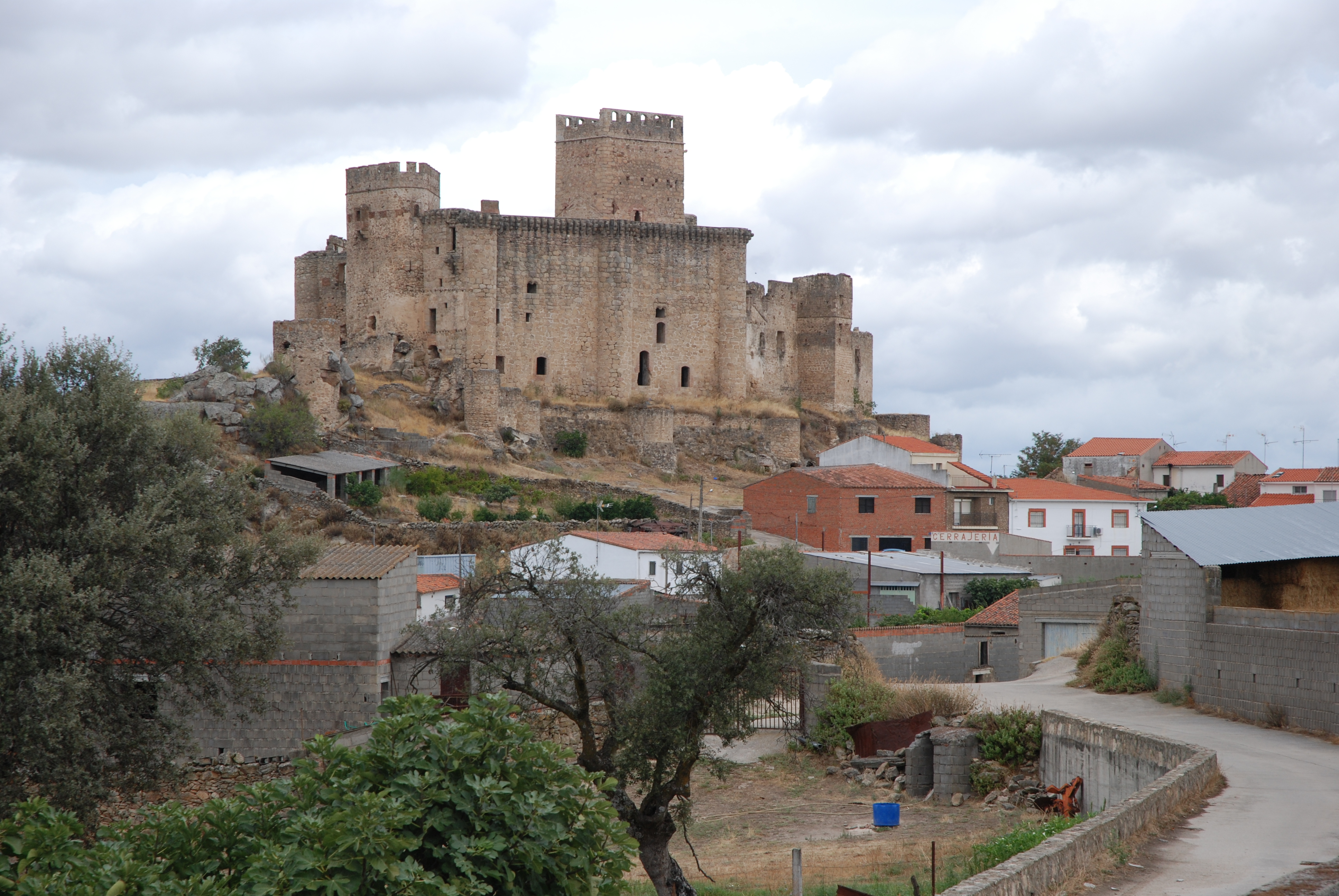
View of Belvís de Monroy

== See also ==
- List of municipalities in Cáceres
