= Heraldo de Aragón =

Spanish daily newspaper

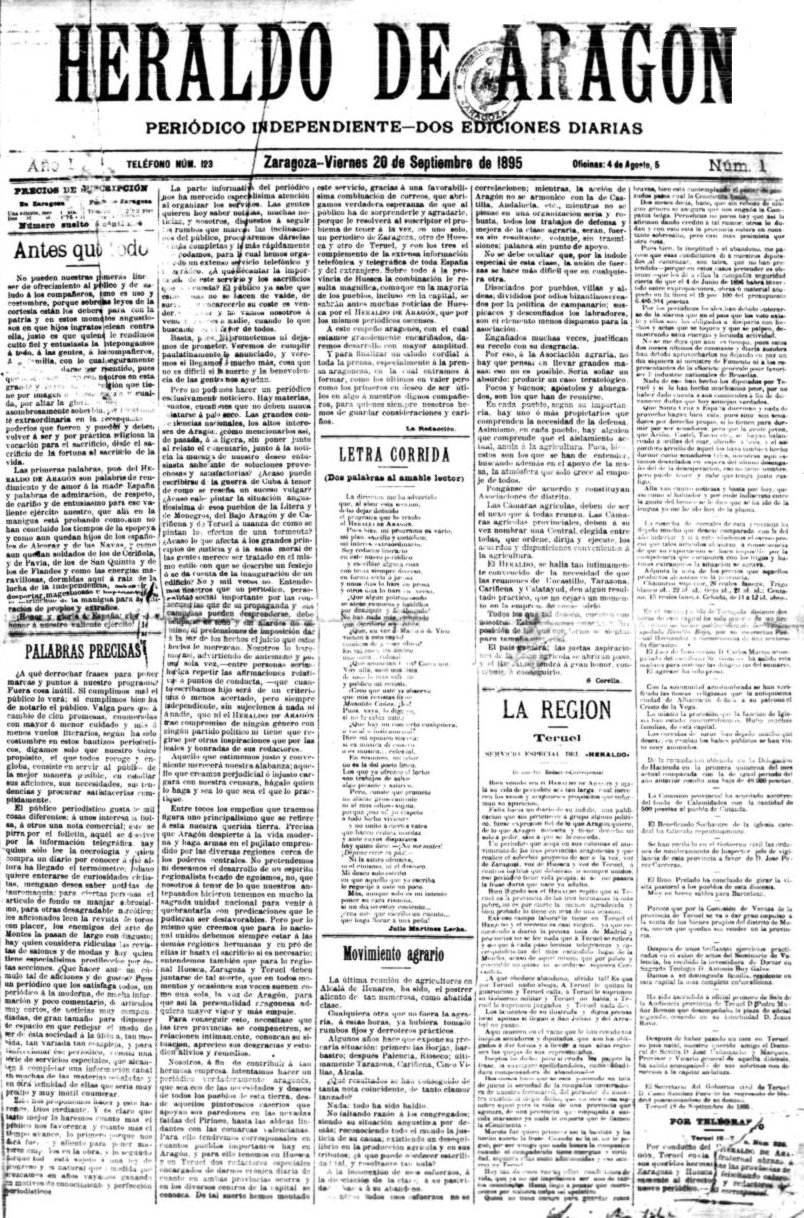
- First issue of Heraldo de Aragón dated 20 September 1895
- Type: Regional daily newspaper
- Format: Broadsheet
- Owner(s): Heraldo de Aragón, S.A.
- Publisher: KBA Comet press
- Founded: 20 September 1895; 131 years ago
- Political alignment: Conservative
- Language: Spanish
- Headquarters: Zaragoza
- Country: Spain
- ISSN: 9968-1587
- OCLC number: 32142051
- Website: Heraldo de Aragón

Heraldo de Aragón is a regional daily newspaper published in Zaragoza, Spain. The paper has been in circulation since 1895.

== History and profile ==
Heraldo de Aragón was first published on 20 September 1895. The owner is Heraldo de Aragón, S.A. which also owns Heraldo de Soria, and Que! Aragón. The publisher of the daily is KBA Comet press. The paper is based in Saragossa and serves the provinces of Huesca, Zaragoza, and Teruel.

Heraldo de Aragón has a conservative political stance. It is published in broadsheet format. The paper was awarded the European Newspaper of the Year award for 2003 in the category of regional newspapers.

As of 2013 Heraldo de Aragón had a science supplement, Tercer Milenio, which was published weekly on Tuesdays since 1993.

== Circulation ==
Heraldo de Aragón has the highest circulation and is the most significant paper in its distribution area. In 1993 the paper sold 58,401 copies. In 2008 the paper had a circulation of 53,087 copies. It was 48,615 copies in the period of 2009–2010. The circulation of the paper was 44,000 copies in 2011.
