= Severiano Martínez Anido =

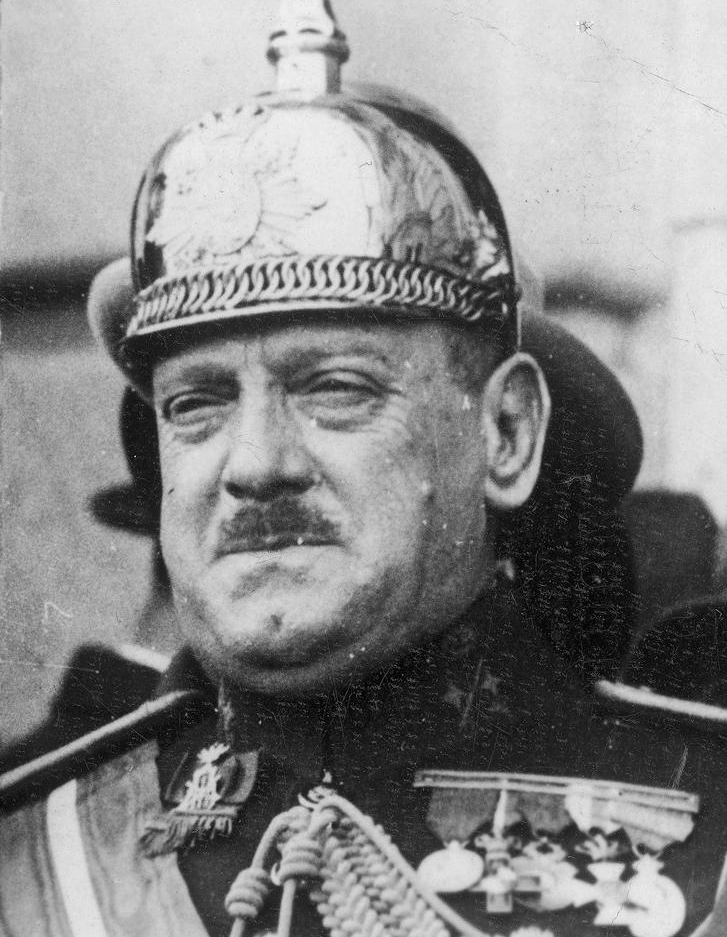

Minister of Public Order of Spain
- In office 31 January 1938 – 24 December 1938
- Caudillo: Francisco Franco
- Prime Minister: Francisco Franco
- Preceded by: Office established
- Succeeded by: Francisco Gómez-Jordana (interim)

Deputy Prime Minister of Spain
- In office 3 December 1925 – 30 January 1930
- Monarch: Alfonso XIII
- Prime Minister: Miguel Primo de Rivera
- Preceded by: Office established
- Succeeded by: Office disestablished

Minister of Governance of Spain
- In office 3 December 1925 – 30 January 1930
- Monarch: Alfonso XIII
- Prime Minister: Miguel Primo de Rivera
- Preceded by: Millán Millán de Pedro
- Succeeded by: Enrique Malch Balaguer

Minister of War of Spain
- Interim
- In office 26 March – 3 November 1928
- Monarch: Alfonso XIII
- Prime Minister: Miguel Primo de Rivera
- Preceded by: Juan O'Donnell
- Succeeded by: Julio Ardanaz (as Minister of the Army)

Personal details
- Born: Severiano Martínez Anido; 21 May 1862 Ferrol, Galicia, Kingdom of Spain
- Died: 24 December 1938 (aged 76) Valladolid, Spanish State

Military service
- Branch/service: Spanish Armed Forces

Severiano Martínez Anido (21 May 1862 – 24 December 1938) was a Spanish general who served in a number of government posts in Spain during the Primo de Rivera and Francoist dictatorships. He became known for the violent repression of the labor movement in Barcelona during the years of pistolerismo.
