= Francisco Ascaso =

Spanish anarcho-syndicalist (1901–1936)

Francisco Ascaso Abadía
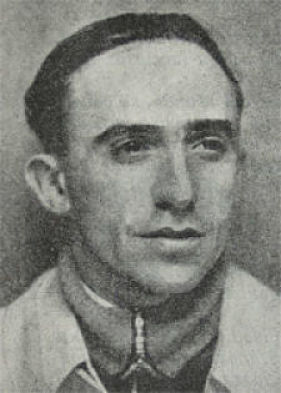
- Born: 1 April 1901; Almudévar, Province of Huesca, Spain
- Died: 20 July 1936 (aged 35); Barcelona, Spain
- Cause of death: Killed in action
- Organization(s): Confederación Nacional del Trabajo, Nosotros
- Movement: Anarchism
- Family: Alejandro Ascaso Abadía (brother); Domingo Ascaso Abadía (brother); Joaquín Ascaso Budria (cousin)

Francisco Ascaso Abadía (1 April 1901 – 20 July 1936) was an Aragonese carpenter and prominent anarcho-syndicalist figure in Spain.

Ascaso lived a life of crime and violence being involved in the deaths of multiple high-profile government officials and as a result frequently detained. By the time of the Spanish Civil War, he had created and been involved in numerous anarchist operations and organizations alongside his close friend Buenaventura Durruti. He was killed during the civil war. Ascaso was the cousin of Joaquín Ascaso, the President of the Regional Defence Council of Aragon.

== Anarchism ==
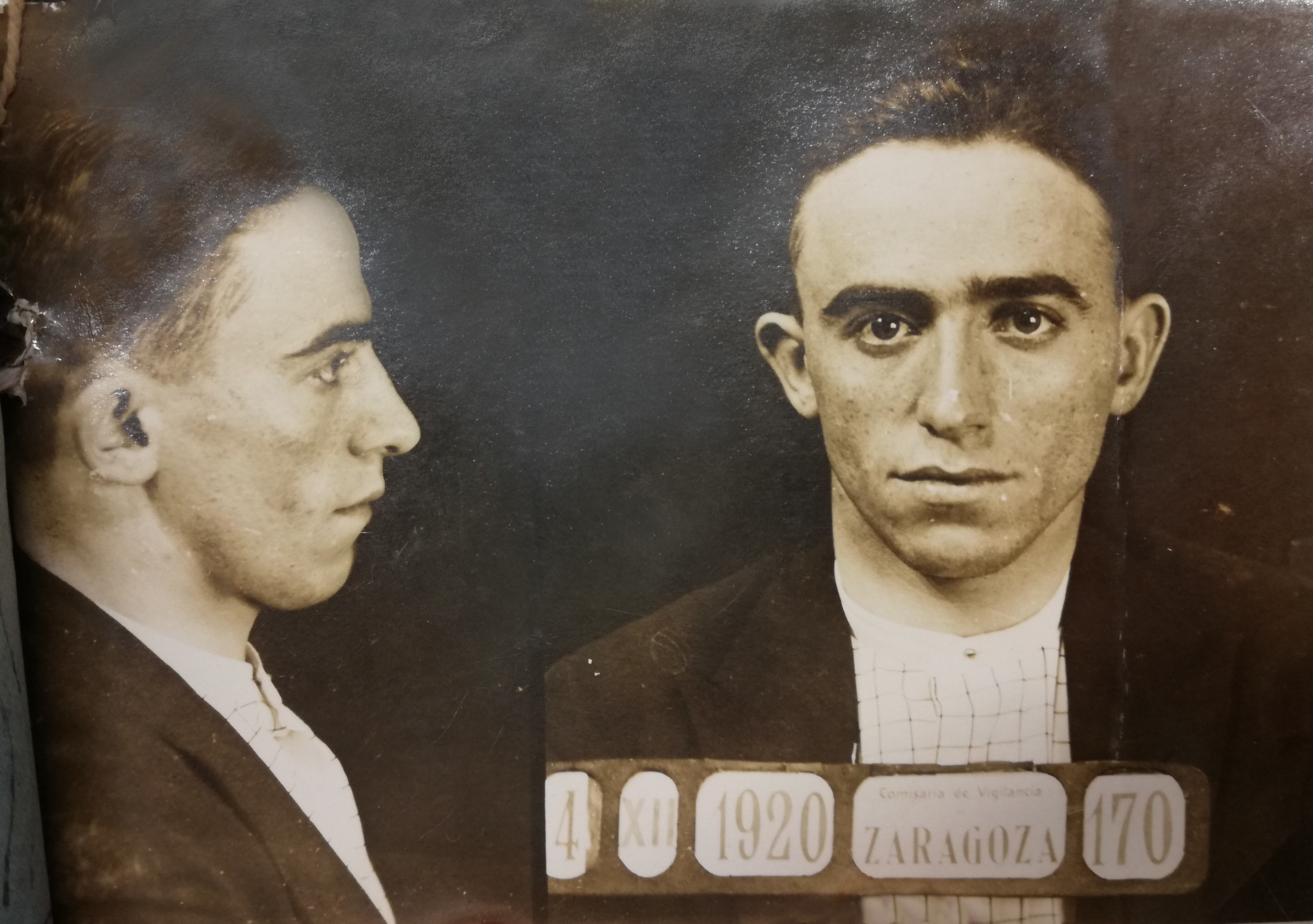
Mugshot of Ascaso, following his arrest in Zaragoza on 4 December 1920

In 1922 or 1923, Ascaso would meet Juan Garcia Oliver and Buenaventura Durruti, and soon form the Los Solidarios in response to ongoing attacks on leaders of the labour movement and the assassination of Salvador Seguí. The group would become involved in the deaths of many prominent leaders of the time such as Spanish Prime Minister Eduardo Dato. Ascaso and Durruti would soon begin a lifelong friendship. Ascaso was drawn to Durruti due to their shared disdain for the "bolshevization", bureaucracy and "falsehoods" of the Russian Revolution.

Ascaso and Oliver soon moved to Manresa in order to avoid detection by the police. Upon arriving they were imprisoned on suspected drug trafficking. Although they were capable of convincing the police captain that they were just there to file papers for legal emigration and therefore avoided incarceration. While living in Manresa, Ascaso learned of Durruti's arrest and trial. He would gather the funds of the Los Solidarios and travel to San Sebastián hoping to aid Durruti in achieving a pardon however this would not happen. Ascaso and Oliver decided that to remain within Manresa would be unwise and so moved to Zaragoza. Ascaso and Oliver become embroiled in a conspiracy to assassinate then Archbishop of Zaragoza Juan Soldevila y Romero which they would successfully execute on 23 June 1923.

Ascaso was arrested for his involvement however he escaped prison with the aid of Durruti and In June 1923, Ascaso and Durruti fled to France in protest of the dictatorship of Miguel Primo de Rivera, Eduardo Dato's successor and then Prime Minister of Spain. Ascaso and Durruti would go onto support the Revolutionary Committee in France at the time as a way of "organizing a revolutionary center in France". Ascaso's method of organization also included the gathering of comrades and arms to further their ideals. In late December, 1924, Ascaso and Durruti were informed of the Revolutionary Committee's dire financial situation and so were instructed to travel to Latin America which they promptly did with the intention of collecting funds.

Ascaso and Durruti spent time in the Caribbean Island, Havana at the house of a young libertarian, J.A. J.A would often engage with Ascaso and Durruti on the topic of anarchism, encouraging them to spread anarchist theory, Ascaso and Durruti ― who believed that propaganda was a necessary element of anarchism ― agreed. They soon left Havana fearing harassment from the police. In late March 1925 Ascaso and Durruti were seeking refuge in Mexico City however soon left, feeling guilty over living in a luxury hotel juxtaposed to the poor neighborhoods. By late February 1926 Ascaso set off to Europe specifically, France. They arrived on 30 April 1926.

On 25 June 1926 Ascaso was arrested by French Police, sentenced to six months, with intent to harm the King of Spain who was visiting France at the time. Upon being arrested Ascaso alongside Durruti and Jover Cortes were informed that they would be handed over to the Argentina government. An initiative entitled the Durruti-Ascaso-Jover Asylum Support Committee by The Anarcho-Communist Union was formed intending for the three men's release. They staged protests and hunger strikes against the police. Although the French government remained firm in their goals. While negotiating for their delivery talks began to become troublesome with both governments accusing each other of negligence. After a period of time the talks fell through and by 27 May 1927 all three men were freed and deported to Belgium.

In November 1927 Ascaso and Durruti arrived in Lyon, France. In January 1928 Ascaso and Durruti traveled to Paris for the purpose of meeting with Joaquín Cortés as well as anarchist groups of the time. They were soon arrested upon arrival "infractions of the law on foreigners". They were sentenced to six months and were released in early October 1928 and arrived in Berlin by Late October. The two men lived with Augustin Souchy. Soon Paul Kampfmeyer, a former anarchist and member of the Berlin Social Democratic party who had previously aided anarchists Nestor Makhno (Note: In 1928 Durruti and Ascaso talked with Makhno about Ukrainian anarchism.) and Emma Goldman escape Russia, came in contact with the two men aiming to provide them with residency permits. During their time in Berlin fear of arrest was omnipresent so the men began to plan leaving. Ascaso returned to Spain by 1931. He returned from a deportation to Africa in 1932 to become an editor of Solidaridad Obrera (Workers' Solidarity) and secretary of the Catalan CNT. He supported CNT militias and opposed political alliances with organizations.

During the Spanish Civil War, while living in Barcelona, Ascaso would form the Antifascist Militias Committee. Ascaso alongside Durruti and the CNT would attack army depots and the prison ship Uruguay with home-made grenades and improvised armoured cars. Ascaso was one of the 500 to die in the assault of Atarazanas barracks. Ascaso was buried in Montjuïc Cemetery alongside Durruti.

== Legacy ==
He was remembered as a "saint" of the anarchist movement and as a hero of the Catalan proletariat.

== Personal life ==
Ascaso's was the brother of fellow anarchists Alejandro Ascaso and Domingo Ascaso who all frequently worked together. Alejandro was born on 17 October 1889. Domingo was killed in Barcelona during the 1937 May Riots. He also had a sister named Maria. In 1927 he started a relationship with Berthe Fabert. In 1924 Ascaso settled in Paris and worked in a plumbing factory which aggravated his respiratory problems.

== Gallery ==
Photos of Ascaso

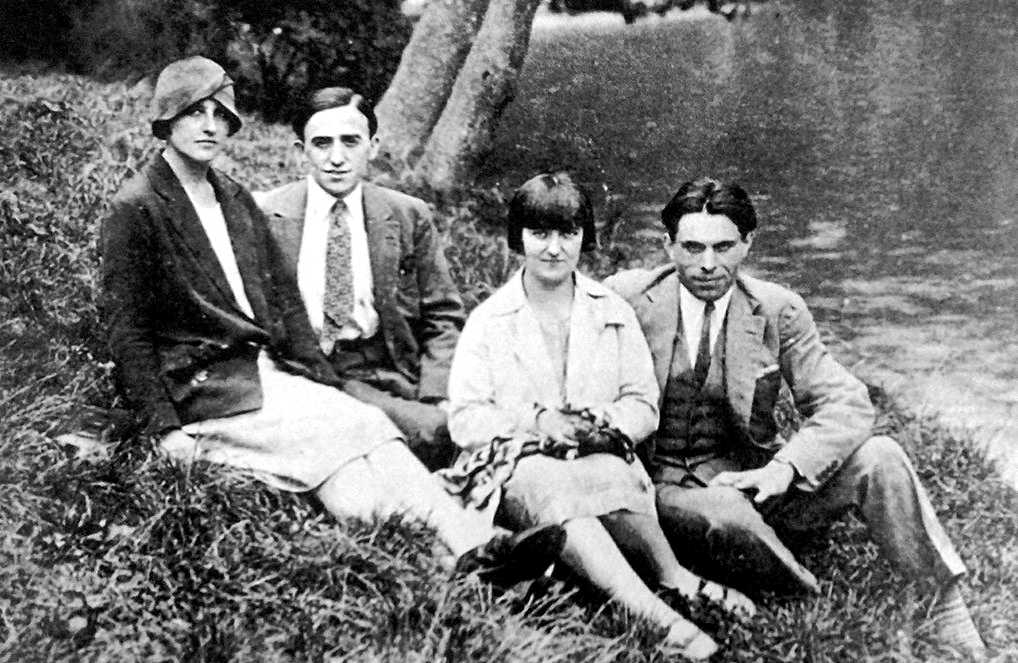
Buenaventura Durruti and Francisco Ascaso with their wives.

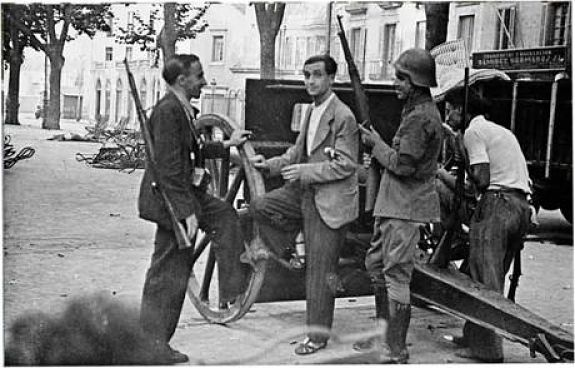
Ascaso during the Spanish Civil War

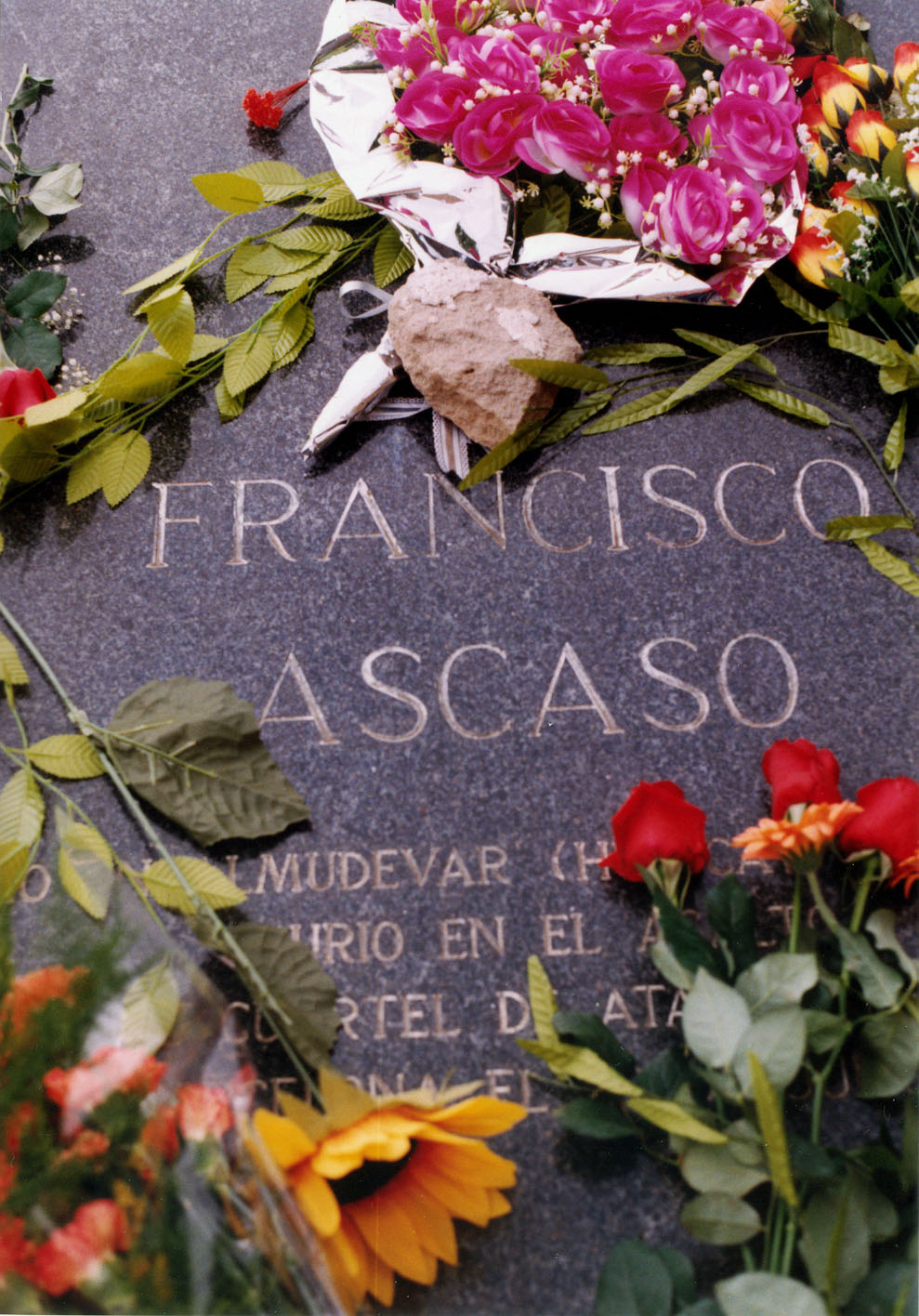
Ascaso's grave
