= Anarchist insurrection of December 1933 =

Attempted Political Revolution

- Date: 8–15 December 1933
- Location: Spain (mainly Aragon and La Rioja)
- Caused by: Right-wing victory in the 1933 Spanish general election
- Goals: Libertarian communism
- Methods: General strike, insurrection
- Result: Insurrection suppressed

Parties
Revolutionaries: Confederación Nacional del Trabajo; Iberian Anarchist Federation	Spanish Republic

Lead figures
Buenaventura Durruti; Cipriano Mera; Isaac Puente; Antonio Ejarque	Diego Martínez Barrio; Alejandro Lerroux; Manuel Rico Avello; Elviro Ordiales

Casualties and losses
75 killed; 101 wounded	11 Civil Guards killed; 3 Assault Guards killed; 45 Civil Guards wounded; 18 Assault Guards wounded

Casualties
- Charged: 700

The anarchist insurrection of December 1933 was an attempted revolution by Spanish anarchists, in response to the victory of the right-wing in the 1933 Spanish general election. It was the third of a series of anarchist insurrections in Spain, following those in January 1932 and January 1933.

The insurrection was centred in Aragon and La Rioja, where revolutionaries took over the regional capitals and a number of small towns, proclaiming libertarian communism and destroying municipal documents. It was accompanied by smaller, isolated actions in towns and cities throughout Spain. In some cases, the insurrection occurred bloodlessly, while in others, violent clashes erupted between revolutionaries and the authorities.

It lasted for only a week, from 8 to 15 December, before it was suppressed by the Spanish Republican Army. Hundreds of insurgents were arrested and sentenced for crimes committed during the insurrection. The new right-wing government, led by Alejandro Lerroux, subsequently repealed many of the social reforms implemented by its predecessor. A general strike broke out in Zaragoza, demanding the release of imprisoned insurgents, but many were not released until after the 1936 Spanish general election.

== Background ==
=== Right-wing politics and unemployment in Spain ===
After the suppression of the anarchist insurrection of January 1933, and the killing of 22 people in the Casas Viejas massacre, the left-wing government of Manuel Azaña came under attack by both the right-wing and the far-left. The Confederación Nacional del Trabajo (CNT), the country's anarcho-syndicalist trade union centre, called for the government to legalise its trade unions, recognise freedom of association and free political prisoners who had been detained during the insurrection. It spent the rest of the year protesting for these demands, holding a general strike in May 1933, after which they began preparing for the possibility of another insurrection. When President Niceto Alcalá-Zamora dissolved the Azaña government and called the 1933 Spanish general election, the Spanish anarchist movement was left with a dilemma. On the one hand, the CNT was committed to abstention from electoral politics. On the other, they were facing the rise of the far-right.

At this time, the Spanish middle class was facing economic difficulties. Employers were quick to fire their workers, causing a rise in unemployment, aiming to demoralise the labour movement enough to elect a new dictatorial right-wing government under José María Gil-Robles. The state provided no unemployment benefits at this time, so the CNT's attentions were turned towards helping workers survive and their revolutionary objectives were sidelined. In mid-1933, the CNT's Economic Defense Commission called a rent strike and for the non-payment of utility bills, while neighbourhood committees prevented the police from carrying out evictions. The CNT provided credit for unemployed workers to purchase basic necessities from the grocery store; the debt would be repaid after they started work again. CNT unions provided lists of job offers for their members, and when employers did not hire them, they occupied the workplaces. If they were removed, they would carry out sitdown strikes outside for eight hours each day, before collecting a "sitting wage" in compensation for not returning to the factory. At noon each day, unemployed workers' unions encouraged their members to go in groups to restaurants and eat the food there, feeding many people. All these actions contributed to the mobilisation of the working class, building solidarity and class consciousness.

When the Transports de Barcelona company refused to recognised union representatives and fired trade union activists, the CNT's Transport Workers' Union went on strike, destroyed streetcars and buses, and sabotaged the company's telecommunications. Individual activists of the CNT were also caught carrying out robberies, prompting the right-wing press to accused the Iberian Anarchist Federation (FAI) of banditry. Prominent activists of the CNT and FAI, including Buenaventura Durruti, were blacklisted by employers, who hoped to antagonise the union into taking premature action. The right-wing press, including La Vanguardia, often reported robberies as having been carried out by the FAI itself, despite the organisation having denounced individual robberies.

=== 1933 elections ===
By the time the CNT called a national meeting to respond to the upcoming general election, various right-wing factions, representing the aristocracy, military officers, bourgeoisie and clergy, joined into a unified bloc: the CEDA. In contrast, the left-wing had been divided and fractured by two years of experience in government. The Spanish Socialist Workers' Party (PSOE), Republican Action (AR) and Radical Socialist Party (PRS) were all internally divided, which caused the parties to either collapse or splinter. Only the Republican Left of Catalonia (ERC), supported by the Catalan middle class, remained internally united. Given the fracturing of the left, the CNT thought that the CEDA would inevitably win the election, even if they encouraged their members to vote for a left-wing candidate. In response, the CNT initiated a massive propaganda campaign, denouncing politicians of both the left and right as "vultures" and calling for workers to abstain from voting. Calls for abstentionism were even taken up by Benito Pabón, a future deputy of the Syndicalist Party, and Miguel Abós, a moderate who had previously voted in the 1931 Spanish local elections.

The CNT's national plenary meeting was held on 30 October 1933 in Madrid, where regional delegates from Aragon proposed they move towards another insurrection. The meeting concluded that, in the event of a right-wing victory in the election, they would carry out a social revolution against the state. After the failure of the January 1933 insurrection, the CNT and FAI realised that they could not achieve victory unless they had allies. Building on previous collaborative efforts in Andalusia, the CNT improved relations with rank-and-file militants of the socialist-aligned Unión General de Trabajadores (UGT), aiming to create a revolutionary alliance in regions such as Asturias. The meeting resolved to carry out a ruthless agitation campaign against the parliamentary system, presenting revolutionary socialism as the best response to fascism. The CNT established a new federation of defense cadres, led by Antonio Ortiz as the organisation's Defense Secretary. The organisation's publication, CNT, proclaimed that libertarian communism would rise again in Spain, calling on people to seize their town halls and establish workers' self-management by organising popular assemblies. The Nosotros group was divided over the proposed insurrection, with Joan Garcia Oliver believing that they did not have the time or resources necessary to put together a strong paramilitary force, while Buenaventura Durruti called for them to participate in any insurrectionary outburst, in order to warn the incoming government of their revolutionary potential.

When the election campaign started, the CEDA immediately began calling for the establishment of a fascist dictatorship and broadcast speeches from José Calvo Sotelo, in exile since his participation in an attempted right-wing coup. The clergy purchased the votes of its congregations, while caciques promised jobs and better living conditions for the peasantry if they voted for the right-wing. On the other side, the PSOE failed to mobilise their supporters, giving half-hearted speeches about revolution to unconvinced crowds, and the AR watched half of its voting bloc switch to Alejandro Lerroux's Radical Republican Party (RRP). Meanwhile, the CNT organised rallies throughout Spain, calling for people to choose between fascism and revolution. On 12 November, a CNT rally in Barcelona's La Monumental arena attracted 100,000 attendees. Buenaventura Durruti, Francesc Isgleas, Benito Pabón and Valeriano Orobón Fernández spoke at the rally. Pabón spoke in the Catalan language, in order to counter the xenophobia of the Catalan nationalists who called all CNT militants "Murcians". Orobón Fernández described the history of Adolf Hitler's rise to power, arguing that both the Social Democratic Party (SPD) and Communist Party of Germany (KPD) had contributed to the victory of the Nazi Party, and urging Spanish socialists to not make the same mistakes. On 16 November, the FAI held a rally at the Palau de les Belles Arts, where attendees vastly outnumbered the venue's 45,000-capacity, forcing more than half of the audience to listen to the speeches through amplifiers placed outside. The rally concluded with a call by the FAI General Secretary Alejandro Gilabert, in the event of a right-wing electoral victory, for people to unleash social revolution, establish libertarian communism and fight until the destruction of all forms of authoritarianism. His resolution was accepted with acclaim and the attendees chanted "Long live Anarchy!" (Spanish: Viva la Anarquía).

On 19 November 1933, the day of the election, Solidaridad Obrera reaffirmed calls for abstention; they told readers not to fear a right-wing victory, as it would ultimately benefit the anarchist movement. As predicted, the right-wing bloc won the general election. The divided left-wing bloc had won only 99 seats (down from 263), while the centre had won 156 (up from 110) and the right won 217 (up from 44). There were high levels of abstention in areas where the CNT was strongest, including Seville (50.16% abstention rate), Málaga (48.37%), Cádiz (62.73%) and Barcelona (40%). The following day, the CNT called for a social revolution to combat the rise of fascism.

== Preparations ==
During the election, the national plenary of the CNT voted to transfer the headquarters of the National Committee to Zaragoza; 230 delegates voted for the transfer, while 153 voted for it to be transferred to Madrid and 100 voted for it to remain in Barcelona. On 14 November, the National Committee established its new headquarters on Calle Argensola, 17, in Zaragoza, where it would continue its work under the General Secretaries Miguel Yoldi and Horacio Prieto.

On 26 November, another national plenary of the CNT was held in Zaragoza, where the organisation resolved to establish a National Revolutionary Committee (NRC) to organise the insurrection. The NRC was led by the Leonese mechanic Buenaventura Durruti, the Aragonese metalworker Antonio Ejarque, the Castilian bricklayer Cipriano Mera, the Basque doctor Isaac Puente, and the Andalusian bricklayers Rafael Casado Ojeda and Rafael García Chacón. The NRC established its headquarters on Calle de los Convertidos in Zaragoza. There they were joined by local Aragonese CNT delegates Joaquín Ascaso, Miguel José, Augusto Moisés Alcrudo, Ramón Andrés, Santiago Baranda and Felipe Orquín (all of whom, except the day labourer Andrés, were bricklayers).

The NRC divided the country into three zones: the red zone, consisting of Aragon, Navarre and La Rioja, where the insurrection would begin in full force; the blue zone, mainly Catalonia, where they would proclaim a general strike and later escalate it into insurrection; and the green zone, in the socialist regions of Asturias, Castile, Euskadi and Galicia, where a general strike would be carried out in an attempt to draw in socialist workers; Andalusia and Valencia were also marked as red-blue. The NRC printed pamphlets calling on industrial workers to occupy their workplaces and seize the means of production, establishing workers' councils to organise a new post-capitalist economy; and calling for agrarian workers to establish communes and take control of food distribution through consumer cooperatives. They also proposed the creation of workers' militias, based on small, mobile guerrilla units, to defend the revolution. The pamphlets were sent to CNT Defense Committees and FAI groups, which copied and distributed them throughout the country.

At a preparatory meeting in Zaragoza, militants disagreed over the plan for Zaragoza to rise up first and then be followed by Teruel and Uesca, with some debating over whether to even initiate the insurrection in Aragon. Durruti warned them that if they backed down, then the insurrection would collapse throughout Spain. He believed that, following sustained repression in Andalusia and Catalonia in the wake of the January insurrection, only Aragon was capable of leading the revolution. He then said that if they still did not want to participate, then they were not obliged to do so, and asked them to decide quickly. He impressed the assembly enough that the Aragonese agreed to lead the insurrection. Despite receiving requests from other regional branches of the CNT to delay the insurrection, as they were not yet prepared, the Aragonese NRC pushed forward with its plans.

== Insurrection ==
=== In Aragon ===
Map of the municipalities of Aragon where libertarian communism was proclaimed (red)

By December 1933, the provincial governor of Zaragoza Elviro Ordiales had noticed that anarchists from outside Aragon were gathering in the regional capital. When he heard rumours that they were planning to carry out an insurrection, on 8 December 1933, he ordered that the CNT offices be shut down and arrested 45 anarchist activists. This led to clashes in the streets, with fighting between anarchists and the police taking place throughout the city centre. By the following night, the street fighting had resulted in the deaths of 12 people and the wounding of several more. A general strike was declared, shutting down shops and public transit. Train lines were also blocked and some convents were subjected to arson attacks. The governor declared a state of emergency and decreed the prohibition of strikes, union meetings and radical publications. The NRC responded with a manifesto declaring the start of a revolution and proclaiming libertarian communism. According to the Heraldo de Aragón, the Zaragoza revolutionaries consisted largely of young, single men, between the ages of 15 and 20.

The uprising quickly spread throughout Aragon. Revolutionaries proclaimed libertarian communism in villages throughout the region, including in: Alcalá de Gurrea, Alcampell, Almudévar, Albalate and Belver de Cinca in the province of Uesca; and Alcorisa, Castellote, Beceite, Mas de las Matas and Valderrobres in the province of Teruel. In these towns, anarchist groups stormed Civil Guard barracks, took over the town halls and arrested civil authorities. As they burned property registers and other official documents, they explained their new system of libertarian communism to gathered citizens and reorganised the supply of goods according to this system. Revolutionaries in these towns did not attempt to take over other areas and instead waited for the arrival of state forces. The insurrection in these areas was quickly defeated, with political repression following soon after. Two insurgents were killed in Alcorisa, one in Alcañiz and another in Barbastro; two Civil Guards were also killed, one in Alcañiz and the other in Barbastro.

The insurrection was the most tightly organised in Albalate de Cinca, where on 9 December, insurgents stormed the Civil Guard barracks and proclaimed libertarian communism. They abolished money, which they replaced with a system of labour vouchers. The following day, Civil Guards were brought in from Fraga and the insurrection was suppressed. 200 people fled the town, including the mayor and local judge, who had helped organise the insurrection. Police arrested 23 men and 3 women, including the local doctor, a schoolteacher, the mayor's wife and daughter and the town council's secretary Félix Carrasquer. In Mas de las Matas, where smallholding was the predominant form of land ownership, the insurrection took place without any violence. On the day the insurrection broke out in Zaragoza, local members of the CNT received an order from the NRC to join the uprising at 01:00 on 9 December. At this time, 50 anarchist workers and smallholders, led by Macario Royo, besieged the Civil Guard barracks and disarmed them. They then arrested town councillors, the local priest and a number of landowners, before burning the municipal archives and proclaiming libertarian communism. Later in the day, the locals held a popular assembly and appointed a revolutionary committee, which was to abolish money and reorganise the economy. But before long, 100 Civil Guards occupied the town, arrested more than 100 of the town's citizens and beat many of the detainees. Royo himself escaped to France, via Barcelona. The town council reconvened on 14 December, but found that all their documents had been destroyed. A few days later, the mayor met with other local officials in Alcañiz, where they discussed how to preempt another revolutionary outbreak in lower Aragon. They resolved to fortify Civil Guard barracks and re-create the regional census, which had been destroyed in the insurrection.

Fighting in Zaragoza continued until 14 December, when Assault Guards were brought in from Burgos, Navarre and Toledo to help suppress the uprising. The employers' association supplied the city with food and armed police were stationed on public transit. The city's mayor Federico Martínez Andrés was requested to supply 8 drivers and 8 guards to restore the bus system, but when he refused, stating that they were needed by the fire service, he was suspended by Governor Ordiales. Municipal employees then refused to follow orders from the provincial authorities, declaring that they answered only to the town hall. But by this time, about 400 people were already detained in the city's prisons and military barracks. The following day, the National Committee of the CNT ordered its members to return to work, bringing the insurrection to an end on 15 December. The NRC decided to stay in the city and accept arrest, hoping they would be able to defend anti-capitalism and the right of revolution in a public trial. They were arrested on 16 December, while having dinner at their headquarters. Mayor Martínez Andrés was returned to his post on 22 December, but he immediately tendered his resignation.

=== In La Rioja ===
Map of the municipalities of La Rioja where libertarian communism was proclaimed (red)

On 9 December, the revolution spread from Aragon to La Rioja, where numerous municipalities saw armed clashes between revolutionaries and the police; two revolutionaries and an Assault Guard were killed in the regional capital of Logroño. In the town of Arnedo, 20-30 revolutionaries seized the town hall, hoisted the anarchist flag and proclaimed libertarian communism. They then occupied the council chambers for four hours, before leaving at the request of the mayor. Later that day, Civil Guards occupied the town, replaced the anarchist flag with the Spanish flag and raided the CNT branch office, arresting 27 CNT members and shutting down the local union. The arrested were all young, male day labourers, most were single, and only one was older than 30. Libertarian communism was also proclaimed in the towns of Briones, Calahorra, Cenicero and Fuenmayor, while the insurrection spread from La Rioja into the province of Burgos.

=== Elsewhere ===
Following the uprisings in Aragon and La Rioja, the insurrection spread to rural areas of Andalusia, Catalonia, Extremadura and León. A wave of general strikes broke out throughout Spain, including in the cities of A Coruña, Badajoz, Barcelona, Córdoba, Granada, Huesca, Seville, València and Xixón. Anarchists and CNT activists agitated for the general strikes to take on revolutionary characteristics, leading to confrontations with the police. The government swiftly declared a state of emergency, mobilising the entire police force and dispatching the armed forces to some cities. As Alejandro Lerroux attempted to secure the investiture of his government, soldiers guarded government buildings in Madrid, while the Civil Guard set up machine guns in Plaza de Cibeles. In cities where revolutionaries took control, militants followed the NRC's instructions and formed workers' militias to patrol the streets. By the following day, the insurrection was already weakening, as the socialist unions stayed out of the conflict, leaving the CNT and FAI alone in confronting the state forces. Nevertheless, over the subsequent week, revolutionary committees throughout Spain occupied centres of civil infrastructure, including town halls, courts and telephone exchanges.

In Valencia, libertarian communism was proclaimed in Tormos and a union hall in Alfafar was bombed by the Spanish Army; railway tracks were also ripped up throughout the region. In Puçol, a rail bridge was blown up, killing 13 people who were riding the Barcelona-Seville train. In the Extremaduran city of Villanueva de la Serena, a workers' militia barricaded itself inside a military recruitment centre, where for two days, they resisted attacks by infantry armed with mortars and machine guns. Miners also seized control of the Leonese town of Fabero.

== Suppression ==
By the time the insurrection ended on 15 December, 75 revolutionaries had been killed and 101 wounded; while on the side of the government, 11 Civil Guards and 3 Assault Guards had been killed and 45 Civil Guards and 18 Assault Guards were wounded. During the crackdown that followed, the CNT was outlawed in Aragon, its unions were shut down, and its publications were banned. Although the chamber of commerce recommended that employers remain calm and civil, they quickly began dismissing and sanctioning workers involved in the insurrection. Newspapers covered the insurrection extensively, publishing photographs of detainees and stories of bomb caches being discovered. Governor Elivro Ordiales' conduct during the insurrection received widespread praise from the middle and upper classes, including from the chamber of commerce itself. Despite opposing votes from socialist and radical socialist councillors, the Zaragoza town hall gave Ordiales the keys to the city.

Hundreds of people were arrested, with about 700 people ultimately being sentenced for the insurrection. In the province of Uesca alone, as many as 202 young male workers were sentenced for their participation in the insurrection. Sentences ranged from less than a year for non-violent participants, to as high as 14 years for those who possessed explosives or assaulted and killed people. Police tortured many prisoners, eliciting a number of forced confessions. The arrested members of the NRC were also tortured, and Elviro Ordiales even intended to apply the ley de fugas to them, but he was dissuaded.

In prison, the NRC considered how they could secure the release of as many detainees as possible. They agreed to a plan concocted by Durruti, who suggested they make the case dossier disappear, allowing for prisoners who gave forced confessions to give new statements. A group of young anarchists then broke into the Zaragoza Commerce Court and stole the dossier from the judges at gunpoint. With the dossier secured, the NRC confessed to sole responsibility for the insurrection, while many prisoners that had given forced confessions were released. Trade unions in Zaragoza then declared a general strike, demanding the release of all prisoners detained after the December insurrection. Fearing that a prison break was being organised, in late February 1934, the government transferred the imprisoned members of the NRC to a prison in the province of Burgos. The Catholic Church was the predominant force in Burgos and the local population was shocked to find out that the NRC were being imprisoned in their city. The NRC members were the only political prisoners held in the prison; they were kept in solitary confinement and under constant surveillance, making it difficult to communicate with other prisoners.

== Aftermath ==
In his analysis of the insurrection, the moderate syndicalist Joan Peiró shared his view that it had failed because it consisted of a small guerrilla movement, rather than an organised mass movement. He declared that revolutions "are made by joining forces not dividing them", and that the FAI, which he blamed for the insurrection, needed to learn this lesson.

=== Bienio Negro ===
By the time the insurrection was suppressed, Alejandro Lerroux finally formed a new right-wing government. The Lerroux government abolished many of the reforms passed by the previous left-wing government, while maintaining its public order laws in order to repress the labour movement. On 11 February 1934, the government annulled the land reform law and evicted 28,000 peasants who had occupied the land of large estates. Caciques responded by cutting wages, reverting the situation of the Spanish peasantry to how it had been before the proclamation of the Republic. Workers responded with strike actions and sabotage, causing confrontations with the police and the Falange Española. In Madrid, strikes by construction workers and metallurgists secured a 44-hour work week.

When the issue of political prisoners was raised in the Congress of Deputies, the government proposed a general amnesty, both for the far-right figures involved in the 1932 coup attempt and for labour movement activists involved in the December 1933 insurrection. In late April 1934, the amnesty was decreed and President Niceto Alcalá-Zamora pardoned General José Sanjurjo and his collaborators. However, the President refused to allow them back to their posts, causing a political crisis that ended with Lerroux being replaced as prime minister by Alcalá-Zamora's ally Ricardo Samper. In response, a monarchist delegation led by Emilio Barrera, Antonio Goicoechea, Antonio Lizarza and Juan Olazábal travelled to Fascist Italy and met with Benito Mussolini and Italo Balbo. They made a plan to carry out a military coup, which would overthrow the Republic and restore the Spanish monarchy; for this, the Italian government gave them 1.5 million pesetas, hoping to gain control of the Balearic Islands in return.

=== Zaragoza general strike ===
When the imprisoned members of the NRC were released under the amnesty, their return to Zaragoza was financed by the Asturian CNT leader Ramón Álvarez, who had also been imprisoned for his part in the insurrection. Álvarez himself then waited in Burgos, while members of the Asturian CNT sent him money so he could return to Xixón. When the members of the NRC arrived back in Zaragoza, the city was still in the midst of a general strike. The strike had been declared demanding the release of everyone detained after the December insurrection, and as there were still CNT activists in prison, it had continued into the spring of 1934. Only vital services in the city, such as hospitals and bakeries, still functioned. All other public services, including electricity and rubbish collection, were suspended. The CNT offered to supply the Aragonese workers with food, but they rejected it. Francisco Ascaso eventually managed to convince them to allow the CNT to care for their children for the duration of the strike; activists from Madrid and Barcelona provided safe passage and care for the children.

In Catalonia, the government of Francesc Macià had overseen a crackdown against the anarchist movement: Catalan prisons were overcrowded, trade unions and their publications were banned, and anarchists were regularly arrested and beaten by police. On one occasion, Catalan police arrested the Italian anti-fascist Bruno Alpini for allegedly carrying out a robbery and executed him under the ley de fugas. A member of the CNT Textile Workers' Union sought to avenge his death by attempting to assassinate police chief Miquel Badia. He ambushed Badia outside a cabaret on Avinguda del Paral·lel and tried to shoot him, but Badia's guard shot him dead. Despite the political repression, over 25,000 people in Barcelona answered the CNT's call to care for the children from Zaragoza. The Catalan government had approached the Aragonese community in Barcelona, offering its help in taking care of the children, but the community rejected the offer, as it had already accepted the help of the CNT and intended to aid their striking compatriots in Zaragoza. This intervention led Francisco Ascaso, the general secretary of the Catalan Regional Committee of the CNT, to believe that the Catalan authorities might attempt to shut down the CNT's child care initiative.

In the afternoon of 6 May, thousands of people arrived outside the offices of Solidaridad Obrera on Carrer del Consell de Cent, where they were scheduled to collect the children at 18:00. When the time came, they were informed that the expedition had been delayed because villages along the way had insisted on greeting the children and expressing solidarity with their striking parents. The expected time of arrival was changed to 21:00, and the crowd stayed put. When the amended time came and went, CNT taxi drivers set off to find the expedition. At 22:00, while the crowd wondered what had happened, the Urban Guard appeared and charged at the crowd, ordering them to disperse. As the Guards advanced, attacking the assembled people, the Aragonese community leaders attempted to call for calm. When they attempted to talk to the Guards, firecrackers were set off, exacerbating the violence. In an attempt to protect the women and children, men formed a human wall around them and took the blows of police batons against their backs. When Assault Guards arrived, they fired their pistols at the crowd, killing one person and wounding several more. Ascaso watched the violence unfold from the balcony of the Solidaridad Obrera offices. After the women and children were escorted to safety, the men who had protected them began fighting back against the police, forcing them to withdraw. Demonstrators then flocked to the city centre, where traffic came to a standstill. A riot ensued, as people set fire to streetcars and attacked a police station. Later that night, Barcelona workers declared a general strike, which lasted almost a week, until 12 May.

Meanwhile, one of the taxi drivers had managed to find out what happened to the children's expedition and reported back to Solidaridad Obrera. He told them that, in Molins de Rei, multiple companies of Assault Guards had blocked the buses carrying the children. Despite protests from the locals, the police diverted the convoy to Terrassa and held the children there. Ascaso led a group of anarchists from Barcelona to Terrassa, but by the time they got there, they found that the city's local anarchist movement had already mobilised. He moved through the crowd to the buses, which were protected by armed workers, and told them to drive to Barcelona. With Ascaso in a taxi at the head of the convoy, the children were finally brought to the Catalan capital and received by their host families.

The campaign to release the imprisoned insurgents was unsuccessful, although many of those involved in the insurrection were ultimately released following the victory of the Popular Front in the 1936 Spanish general election.

== Bibliography ==
- Casanova, Julián (2005). "On the road to insurrection". In Preston, Paul (ed.). Anarchism, the Republic and Civil War in Spain: 1931–1939. Translated by Dowling, Andrew; Pollok, Graham. Routledge. pp. 64–83. ISBN 0-415-32095-X.
- Herrerín, Ángel (2020). "To the Barricades! (May 1932–December 1933)". The Road to Anarchy: The CNT under the Spanish Second Republic (1931–1936). Sussex Academic Press. pp. 93–148. ISBN 9781789760316.
- Kern, Robert W. (1978). Red Years/Black Years: A Political History of Spanish Anarchism, 1911-1937. Institute for the Study of Human Issues. ISBN 0-915980-54-1. LCCN 77-13595.
- Paz, Abel (2006) [1996]. Durruti in the Spanish Revolution. Translated by Morse, Chuck. Edinburgh: AK Press. ISBN 1-904859-50-X. LCCN 2006920974. OCLC 482919277.
