= Alt Llobregat insurrection =

1932 general strike in Catalonia, Spain

- Municipalities where libertarian communism was proclaimed (red) in the comarques of Berguedà and Bages (pink)
- Date: 18–27 January 1932
- Location: Berguedà and Bages, Central Catalonia
- Caused by: Political repression, exploitation of labour
- Goals: Libertarian communism
- Methods: General strike, insurrection
- Result: Insurrection suppressed: Rebel towns occupied by the Spanish Army; Anarchists imprisoned and deported

Parties
Revolutionaries: Confederación Nacional del Trabajo; Iberian Anarchist Federation	Spanish Republic; Civil Guard; Sometent; Spanish Army

Lead figures
Buenaventura Durruti; Vicente Pérez; Arturo Parera	Manuel Azaña; Santiago Casares Quiroga; Domènec Batet; Joan Moles; José Enrique de Olano

Casualties
- Death: None
- Arrested: Hundreds
- Deported: 104 CNT activists

The Alt Llobregat insurrection was a revolutionary general strike which took place in central Catalonia, in the northeast of Spain, in January 1932. Initially organised as a wildcat strike by miners in Fígols, who were protesting against low wages and poor working conditions, it soon turned into a general revolt and spread throughout the region. Workers seized local institutions, disarmed the police and proclaimed libertarian communism, all without any killing taking place. Within a week, the rebellion was suppressed by the Spanish Army. A subsequent rebellion in Aragon was also suppressed. In the wake of the insurrection, many anarchist activists were imprisoned or deported. The suppression of the insurrection caused a split in the Confederación Nacional del Trabajo, with its radical faction ultimately taking control of the organisation and the moderate faction splitting off to form the Syndicalist Party. Further insurrections were carried out by CNT activists in January and December 1933.

== Background ==
When the Second Spanish Republic was proclaimed on 14 April 1931, it brought an end to years of dictatorship which had driven the Spanish anarchist movement underground and forced its members into exile. The drafting of the Spanish Constitution of 1931 caused divisions in the Provisional Government. The separation of church and state was approved by the Constituent Cortes on 13 October 1931, with 178 votes in favour and 59 opposed. Members of the Liberal Republican Right, including Prime Minister Niceto Alcalá-Zamora and Interior Minister Miguel Maura, resigned from the provisional government over the issue.

The Spanish Socialist Workers' Party (PSOE), Radical Socialist Republican Party (PRRS) and Republican Action (AR) then came together to form a new left-wing government, excluding the right-wing republican parties. Manuel Azaña became the new prime minister, Santiago Casares Quiroga took over as Interior Minister and José Giral was appointed as Navy Minister. Without the influence of business owners and the Catholic clergy over the new government, many in the working class hoped they would address unemployment and land reform, but neither of these came to fruition. Instead, on 20 October, the government passed the Law for the Defense of the Republic, which increased the power of the Interior Ministry. On 9 December 1931, the Constituent Cortes approved the new constitution and elected Alcalá-Zamora as the first President of the Republic. On 11 December, Alcalá-Zamora accepted the nomination, swore to uphold the new constitution and proclaimed the day a national holiday.

While the government ratified the constitution, social conflict spread throughout the nascent Spanish Republic. In Zaragoza, workers proclaimed a general strike; in Xixón, the occupation of factories took place, culminating with the violent intervention of the Civil Guard, which killed 1 worker and wounded 11 others. On 31 December, Casares Quiroga dispatched the Civil Guard to the Extremaduran town of Castilblanco to suppress a strike action by the local peasantry. Local activists responded to the intervention by surrounding the Civil Guards and killing them. The Civil Guard retaliated against villages throughout the country, attacking La Almarcha, Calzada de Calatrava and Puertollano in New Castile. In the Aragonese town of Épila, the Civil Guard opened fire on striking workers, killing 2 people and wounding several others. The Civil Guard also attacked striking workers in the Valencian town of Xeresa, killing 4 people and wounding 3 others. In the Riojan town of Arnedo, the Civil Guard again opened fire on striking workers, killing 6 men and 5 women and wounding 18 men and 11 women.

In the anarchist newspaper Tierra y Libertad, the Iberian Anarchist Federation (FAI) proclaimed that the country had been "kidnapped" by the Civil Guard and printed graphic depictions of the violence. In the Valencian city of Villena, the novelist Pío Baroja proclaimed that the Republic had killed more people in a few months than the monarchy had in forty years. The events in Épila, Xeresa and Arnedo provoked a furious response from anarcho-syndicalists in Barcelona, who began to speak of carrying out a revolution against the Republic.

== Insurrection ==
=== Instigation ===
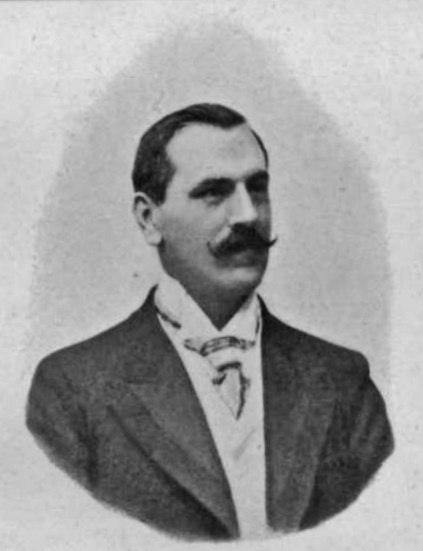
José Enrique de Olano, the Count of Fígols

Despite the changes brought by the new Republican constitution, which had officially declared Spain to be a workers' republic, low wages and poor working conditions prevailed for miners and textile workers in central Catalonia. Since June 1931, deteriorating working conditions for potash miners in the Llobregat and Cardener river valleys had caused a rise in social tensions. José Enrique de Olano, the autocratic Count of Fígols, owned the coal and potash mines in Alt Llobregat. He forced the miners to work in unsafe conditions, paid them in scrip and restricted their life to a company town, where food was purchased from the company store. He also refused his workers the rights to freedom of assembly and freedom of association, and effectively controlled the Civil Guard in the region. The mining company made use of the Civil Guard to arrest disobedient workers, attack their unions and shut down left-wing publications. Many of the miners who had migrated from Cartagena considered returning to their home region, while others began to consider violence. Meanwhile, in the regional capital of Manresa, Joan Selves reported that employers had refused to comply with the new minimum wage law and continued to pay textile workers starvation wages.

Members of the Confederación Nacional del Trabajo (CNT), an anarcho-syndicalist union, put together a plan to channel the workers' discontent into an insurrection. In early January 1932, the anarchist activists Buenaventura Durruti, Vicente Pérez and Arturo Parera embarked on a speaking tour of the region. They encouraged workers to rise up in revolution against capitalism and the state, and showed them how to manufacture improvised explosive devices from dynamite and tin cans. In Tierra y Libertad, Felipe Alaiz warned that a dictatorship was being established in Spain by the Socialist and Republican parties, and called for anarchists to take direct action against the government. Historians Gerald Brenan, Pierre Broué, Émile Temime and Hugh Thomas would later attribute the instigation of the insurrection to the Iberian Anarchist Federation (FAI), but Parera himself claimed that the FAI had not participated in an organisational capacity.

=== Outbreak ===
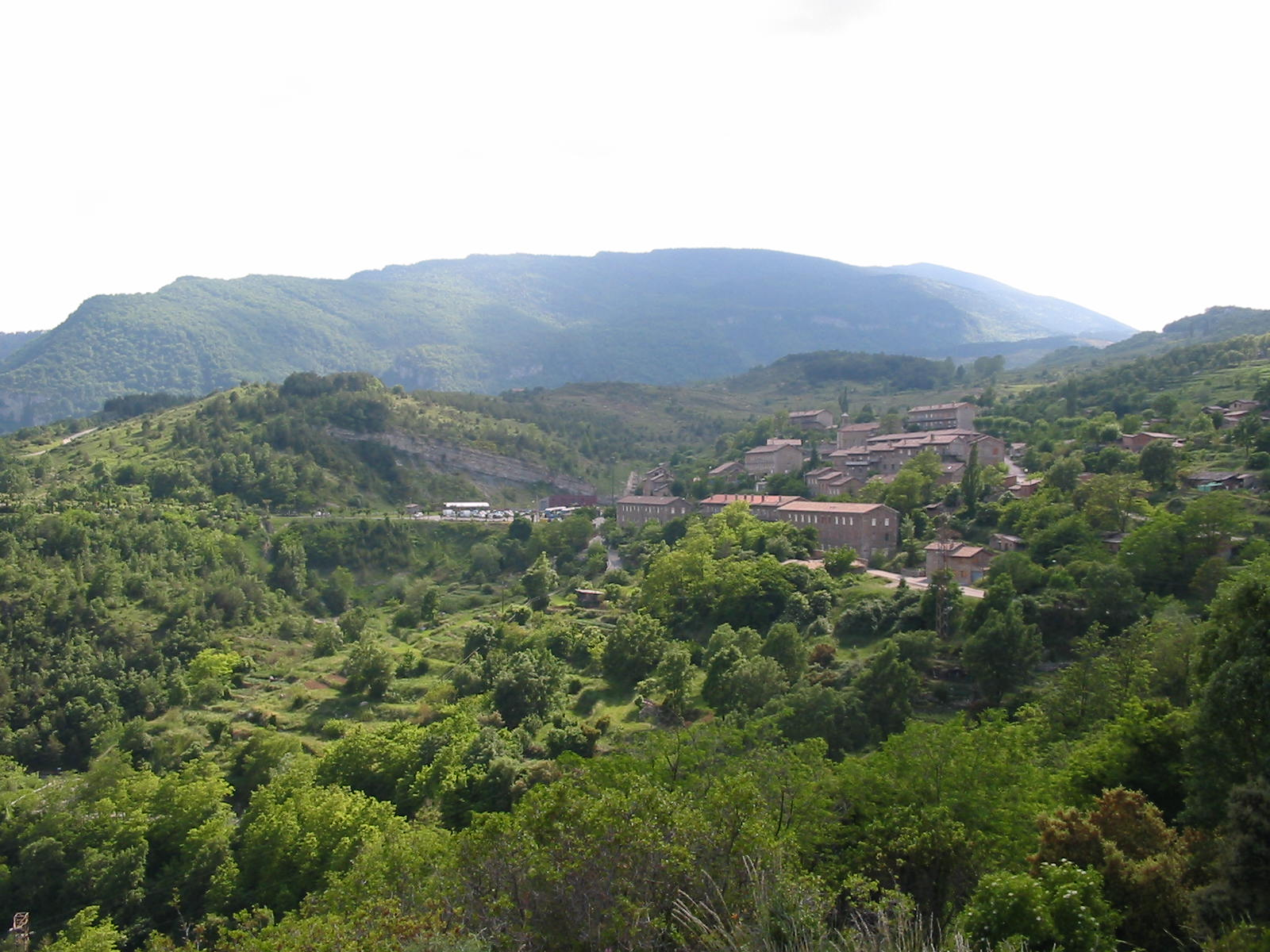
Sant Corneli Colony, the company town in Fígols where the insurrection first broke out

On 18 January 1932, miners of the Sant Corneli Colony in Fígols carried out a wildcat strike, demanding improvements to their living and working conditions. As they believed the strike would only succeed if they could prevent their employers from repressing it, they disarmed the Civil Guard and the Sometent parapolice force, and they coordinated workers' patrols of the town's streets. The flag of the CNT was raised above the town hall and from the steeple of the local church. Before long, the workers of Fígols had formed a revolutionary committee, which proclaimed the establishment of libertarian communism in the region. According to an oral history by historian Cristina Borderias, the proclamation of communism was broadly accepted by the insurgent populace, for whom it meant social justice and freedom.

When the Catalan Regional Committee of the CNT received news of the insurrection breaking out in Fígols, they moved to support the workers' movement and expand it throughout Berguedà and Bages. By 20 January, strike actions had spread to the neighbouring towns of Balsareny, Berga and Sallent, then on to Cardona, Navarcles and Súria, where workers shut down the mines and other local businesses. In Sallent, syndicalists seized explosives from the local potash factory and raised a red flag over the town hall. In Manresa, workers picketed outside of factories and workshops. Revolutionaries took control of the region's telephone exchanges and roads. Workers also cut telephone lines, which gave the first indication to the outside world that the strike had escalated into an insurrection. Workers throughout central Catalonia seized their town halls, where they replaced the tricolour flag of the Spanish Republic with the red and black flag of anarchism.

The workers of central Catalonia declared the abolition of private property and the state. They also established a non-monetary economy, replacing money with a system of labour vouchers and the sharing of resources under common ownership. No looting or killing took place during the insurrection. According to reports by the anarchist newspaper La Tierra, the insurgents secured the region without arbitrary attacks against their political enemies, whether police, judges or priests. Once the region had been taken, the insurgent workers returned to their jobs in the coal fields.

=== Suppression ===
After members of the Civil Guard were fired at and injured, the Civil Governor of Barcelona, Joan Moles, called in reinforcements to suppress the rebellion. On 21 January, Prime Minister Azaña addressed the insurrection in the Congress of Deputies. Employers associations reported that he spoke with "fortitude and sincerity". He denied that the movement was a labour conflict, claiming that there had been an agreement between the workers and their employers, although he did not know if the agreement had been upheld. He declared that, while the Republic's legal code recognised the right to strike, the workers had no right to rebellion. Azaña concluded his remarks by claiming that the insurrection had been directed by foreign agents and called for it to be suppressed. After receiving parliamentary support for intervention, he ordered Domènec Batet, the Captain General of Catalonia, to suppress the insurrection. According to historian Josep Peirats, Azaña gave the captain general "fifteen minutes to eliminate them after the troops arrived." Despite Azaña's orders, the government forces in central Catalonia would come under the command of infantry commander Humberto Gil Cabrera, who moved to end the insurrection with little bloodshed.

On 22 January, reinforcements were brought in from the provinces of Lleida, Girona, Uesca and Zaragoza. The Spanish Army swiftly occupied Manresa. By 23 January, every town in the region had been occupied, except for the revolutionary stonghold of Fígols. The following day, Spanish troops entered the town, where they discovered that the insurgent miners had blown up the explosives warehouse and fled into the mountains. By 25 January, the insurrection was over and social order was restored in central Catalonia. People in the region who had opposed the insurrection collaborated in the political repression that followed. Miners who had participated in the insurrection were dismissed from their jobs, and only those who had been marginal participants were rehired. In the end, the libertarian communist experiment had lasted less than a week.

=== Rebellion in Aragon ===
On 23 January, while the insurrection in Catalonia was being brought to an end, the National Committee of the CNT called for a general strike in solidarity with the insurgents. The call was only taken up by local unions in a few small towns. In Valencia, a small group of anarchists in the town of Sollana rebelled for a few hours. In Aragon, the local branches of the CNT in Binéfar and Belver de Cinca called a general strike, shutting down businesses, cutting telephone lines and blocking the railway into Lleida province; anarchist activists also planted two bombs at a Civil Guard barracks in Alcorisa; and, on 25 January, militants in Castel de Cabra declared the establishment of a council republic. The latter group of revolutionaries seized the Castel de Cabra town hall, burned the tax register, barricaded the mayor in his house, and stole explosives from the construction company building the Teruel-Alcañiz railway line. Soldiers were brought in from the provinces of Barcelona and Zaragoza to suppress the rebellion, and by 27 January, social order was restored in Aragon.

In the wake of the rebellion, dozens of activists were arrested and the CNT branch offices in Uesca and Teruel were closed down. Sixteen CNT members were arrested for the Alcorisa bombing and kept in pre-trial detention for 20 months; their trial finally took place in November 1933, with their defense lawyer Gregorio Vilatela securing their acquittal and release. The Aragonese Regional Committee of the CNT officially denied involvement in the insurrection and claimed it had attempted to stop it, but as government action against them intensified, they began to encourage a violent response. A few days after publishing a communique calling for action, the Aragonese CNT's periodical Cultura y Acción was shut down; it did not resume publication until the Spanish Revolution of 1936. Solidaridad Obrera was also suspended on 22 January, but it resumed publication on 4 March.

=== Arrests and deportations ===
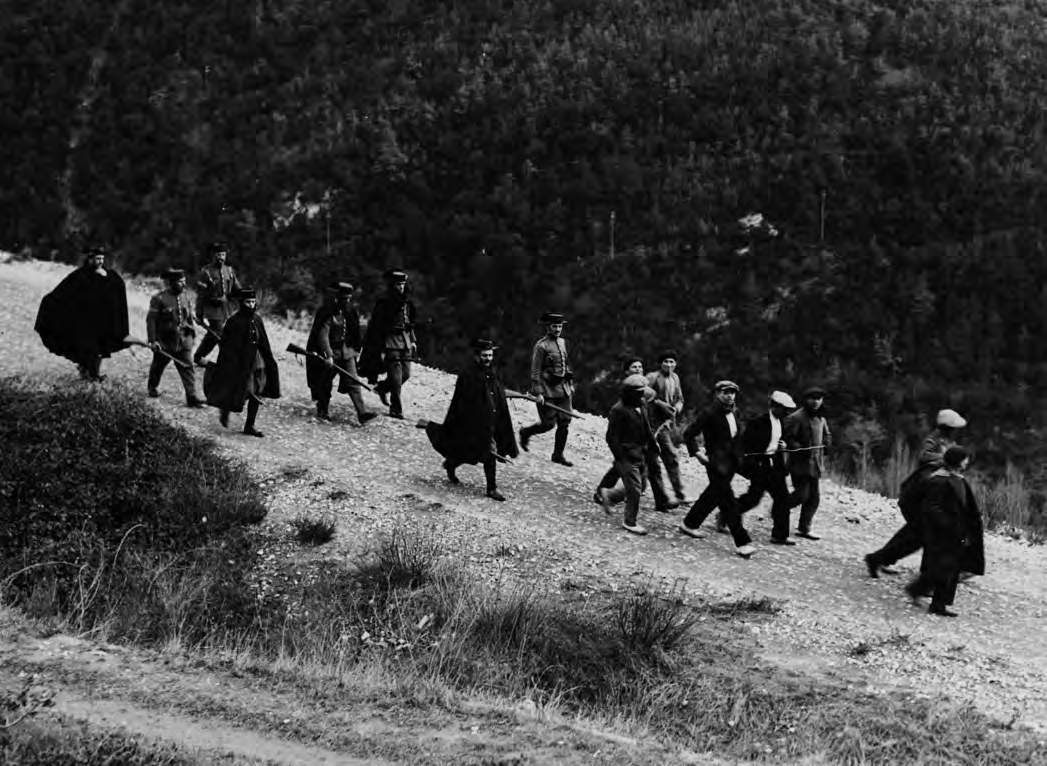
Miners under arrest, after the insurrection

In application of the Law for the Defense of the Republic, the authorities launched a mass raid against anarchists in the Catalan capital of Barcelona. On the morning of 20 January, police began arresting people in their homes; the teacher Tomás Cano Ruiz was one of the first to be arrested. The following morning, Durruti was arrested, and in the afternoon, Francisco and Domingo Ascaso were detained. Gregorio Jover and Ramon Vila Capdevila were also arrested. Without a single trial being held, the arrested men were selected for either imprisonment or deportation. Hundreds of people were imprisoned in Barcelona and Manresa. Over 100 militants of the CNT, many of whom had not taken any part in the insurrection, were marked for deportation. On 22 January, the deportees were packed into the hold of the Buenos Aires, a transport ship of the Spanish Transatlantic Company. By 26 January, more than 200 CNT activists were detained on the ship. The detainees were provided with no bedding and little food and water, were constantly watched by the ship's crew, and were denied visitors, packages and mail. On 28 January, about 100 of the detained activists began a hunger strike in protest against the conditions of their confinement.

The ship was kept in port until 10 February, when it was cleared to set sail. On the day the ship left port, deputies of the Republican Left of Catalonia (ERC) requested that the government commute the deportation sentences. The ship embarked with 104 prisoners on board and collected more prisoners from Cádiz, before leaving mainland Spain. The ship passed through the Canary Islands and Bioko, before it finally made port at Dakhla on 3 April. By the time the deportees arrived in the Río de Oro colony, many had fallen gravely ill and one had died. The deportees returned to mainland Spain by September 1932, by which time the CNT and FAI were once again in open conflict with the Spanish government.

After consulting with its membership, on 15 February, the National Committee of the CNT called a 24-hour general strike to protest the deportations. Violent clashes broke out between striking workers and the police, with one outburst in Zaragoza leaving 4 dead and 15 wounded, which further instilled feelings of victimisation in members of the CNT. In towns throughout Catalonia, revolutionary anarchists formed executive committees to take control of localities and enforce their proclamations of libertarian communism; anarchist historian César M. Lorenzo characterised these events as an attempt to create a dictatorship of the proletariat. Inspired by Alt LLobregat, anarchist groups in Terrassa occupied the city hall and proclaimed libertarian communism. Revolutionary actions continued to escalate throughout the country, with peasants in Andalusia, Aragon, Castile and Valencia seizing haciendas from their landlords. In the midst of the clashes between the anarchists and the government, CNT General Secretary Ángel Pestaña continued to hold meetings with Prime Minister Azaña and Interior Minister Casares Quiroga, requesting that the deportees be pardoned. Azaña blamed the anarchists for the crackdown against them, offering to release the deportees only after a sustained period of peace.

== Aftermath ==
The Alt Llobregat insurrection exacerbated the internal divisions in the CNT, which had split into moderate and radical factions. The militants arrested after the insurrection had all been radical faistas (members of the FAI), which briefly strengthened the position of the moderate treintistas within the CNT. The treintistas criticised the spontaneity of the insurrection, arguing that the state forces had been able to suppress the rebellion because the anarchists had presented a "dispersed, incoherent and atomised line of battle". They concluded that the working class needed stronger organisation in order to take collective action, and thus called for the CNT to take control of the country's various social movements. On the other hand, the insurrection had convinced the FAI of the practicability of revolutionary anarchism and libertarian communism, while the anarchist magazine La Revista Blanca declared that "the downfall of bourgeois society is at hand". Meanwhile, left communists pointed to the insurrection as an example of a political revolution, in which revolutionaries had attempted to seize political power through executive committees. The Workers and Peasants' Bloc (BOC), a Marxist party which had attracted a number of CNT members into its ranks, proclaimed that anarchism had "ceased to exist" and that the Marxist thesis of seizing political power had been accepted by the working class. The insurrection also raised the issue of libertarian communism with liberal intellectuals, with Salvador de Madariaga mocking the revolutionaries for the impracticability of their ideas, which he described as Quixotism.

On 19 February, anarchist agitator Federica Montseny published the article "¡Yo Acuso!", in which she criticised the CNT's leaders for failing to provide a prompt and sufficient response to the uprising. Montseny herself believed that the reason for Pestaña's behaviour was that the Catalan government had promised him an official position. Her father, Joan Montseny, launched a smear campaign against Pestaña in the newspaper El Luchador. Anarchist militant Joan Garcia Oliver also accused Pestaña of having sabotaged the National Committee's call for a general strike, alleging that he had sent letters to the CNT's each regional committee saying that all other regional committee already opposed a general strike. Pestaña responded that he believed the proposals for a general strike had been used as pretext to impose a dictatorship within the CNT, prompting a wave of demands for him to resign, including from 200 CNT prisoners in La Model. A general meeting of the CNT's regional committees denounced the anti-Pestaña campaign for dividing and weakening the anarchist movement, but by March 1932, Pestaña had resigned as General Secretary. He was succeeded by the revolutionary anarchist Manuel Rivas, who presided over a new National Committee dominated by activists from affinity groups, including Marcos Alcón, José Ramos, Ricardo Sanz and Miguel Terrén. On 29 May, the CNT National Committee called a national day of protest. This ultimately resulted the severance of the previously cordial relations between the CNT and the left-wing nationalists of the ERC.

As a wave of strikes erupted in Catalonia, in late April 1932, a regional plenum of the CNT was held in Sabadell, where up to 300 delegates represented up to 250,000 workers. By this time, the union rank-and-file had turned decisively against the treintistas, with the plenum electing the faista Alejandro Gilabert as the new regional secretary of the CNT in Catalonia. The plenum also voted to expel local CNT branches in Lleida, Girona and Tarragona, which had come under the influence of the BOC. The local branch of the CNT in Sabadell was itself heavily influenced by the treintistas, who sought to use it to regain control of the CNT. In September 1932, the Sabadell branch began to withhold union dues from the Catalan regional committee, which responded by expelling it from the CNT; they were soon followed by other unions in Valencia. These Catalan and Valencian unions, representing 60,000 workers, reorganised into the Opposition Unions, which hoped to eventually rejoin the CNT. The split was criticised by the nascent Libertarian Youth (FIJL), who accused the Opposition Unions of seeking affiliation with political parties. At this time, Pestaña himself was expelled from his own metalworkers' union. He continued to uphold gradualism, going on to establish the Syndicalist Party, while other reformist figures such as Joan Peiró and Juan López Sánchez eventually rejoined the CNT.

By late 1932, the collapse of the reformist faction of the CNT led to many members of the FAI merging back into the CNT's union structures, particularly its Defense Committees. At this time, leaders of the social movements which the treintistas had sought to control were already preparing for another insurrection. The CNT defense committees had come to see the Alt LLobregat insurrection as proof that revolution was possible. Inspired by the insurrection, political theorists also began publishing articles and pamphlets about the organisation of a libertarian communist society, with Isaac Puente's libertarian communist programme even being adopted by the FAI and later the CNT at large. In January 1933, the Regional Defense Committee of Catalonia launched another insurrection. This one spread throughout much of Spain, before it was violently suppressed. In the immediate aftermath, the police carried out a massacre against workers in the Andalusian town of Casas Viejas.

== See also ==
- Revolutionary Catalonia

== Bibliography ==
- Alba, Victor; Schwartz, Stephen (1988). Spanish Marxism versus Soviet Communism: A History of the P.O.U.M. Transaction Publishers. doi:10.4324/9781315130118-3. ISBN 0-88738-198-7.
- Balcells, Albert (1996). Walker, Geoffrey J. (ed.). Catalan Nationalism: Past and Present. Palgrave Macmillan. doi:10.1007/978-1-349-24278-8_9. ISBN 978-1-349-24278-8.
- Bookchin, Murray (1978). The Spanish Anarchists: The Heroic Years 1868–1936. Harper & Row. ISBN 0-06-090607-3.
- Casanova, Julián (2005). Preston, Paul (ed.). Anarchism, the Republic and Civil War in Spain: 1931–1939. Translated by Dowling, Andrew; Pollok, Graham. Routledge. ISBN 0-415-32095-X.
- Casanova, Julián (2010). The Spanish Republic and Civil War. Cambridge University Press. ISBN 978-0-521-49388-8.
- Christie, Stuart (2008). We, the Anarchists: A Study of the Iberian Anarchist Federation (FAI). AK Press. ISBN 9781904859758. LCCN 2007939202.
- Evans, Danny (2016). "'Ultra-left' anarchists and anti-fascism in the Second Republic". International Journal of Iberian Studies. 29 (3): 241–256. doi:10.1386/ijis.29.3.241_1. ISSN 1364-971X.
- Evans, Danny (2018). Revolution and the State: Anarchism in the Spanish Civil War, 1936–1939. Routledge. ISBN 978-1-138-06314-3.
- Gómez Casas, Juan (1986). Anarchist Organisation: The History of the F.A.I. Black Rose Books. ISBN 0-920057-40-3.
- Paz, Abel (2006) [1996]. Durruti in the Spanish Revolution. Translated by Morse, Chuck. AK Press. ISBN 1-904859-50-X. LCCN 2006920974. OCLC 482919277.
- Sanz Rozalén, Vicent (2013). Konrad, Helmut; Maderthaner, Wolfgang (eds.). Routes Into the Abyss: Coping with Crises in the 1930s. Berghahn Books. doi:10.1515/9780857457851-007. ISBN 9780857457851.
- Seidman, Michael (1991). Workers Against Work: Labor in Paris and Barcelona During the Popular Fronts. University of California Press. ISBN 0520069153.
- Seidman, Michael (2011). The victorious counterrevolution: the nationalist effort in the Spanish Civil War. University of Wisconsin Press. ISBN 978-0-299-24964-9.
- Tavera i Garcia, Susanna (2012). "Anarchism or anarchisms? The history of a heterogeneous revolutionary deployment, 1930-1938". Catalan Historical Review (5): 101–16. ISSN 2013-4088.
