= Anarchist insurrection of January 1933 =

Insurrection in Spain

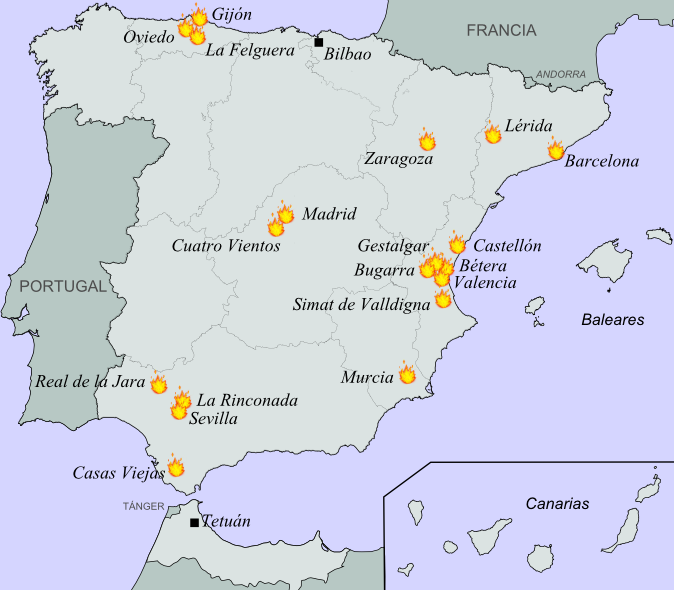
- Date: 8–12 January 1933
- Location: Spain (largely in the provinces of Barcelona, Cádiz, Uesca and Valencia)
- Caused by: Political repression, exploitation of labour
- Goals: Libertarian communism
- Methods: Insurrection
- Result: Insurrection suppressed: Insurgent leaders imprisoned; Casas Viejas massacre

Parties
Revolutionaries: Iberian Anarchist Federation; Confederación Nacional del Trabajo	Spanish Republic: Assault Guard; Carabineros; Civil Guard; Spanish Army

Lead figures
Joan Garcia Oliver; Francisco Ascaso; Buenaventura Durruti	Manuel Azaña; Santiago Casares Quiroga; Arturo Menéndez; Manuel Rojas Feijespán

Casualties and losses
26 anarchists killed (Catalonia); 4 anarchists killed (Valencia); 21 peasants killed (Casas Viejas)	2 Civil Guards killed (Casas Viejas)

Casualties
- Detained: 6,000

The anarchist insurrection of January 1933 was an attempted revolution carried out by Spanish anarchists, with the intention of overthrowing the government of Spain and establishing libertarian communism.

The suppression of the Alt Llobregat insurrection in January 1932 led to the arrest and deportation of numerous anarchists, as well as an internal split within the Confederación Nacional del Trabajo (CNT). The Iberian Anarchist Federation (FAI), which supported insurrectionary anarchism, gained control over the CNT, marginalising the moderate treintista faction. With the passage of new labour laws by the Republican government, the CNT's activities were repressed throughout the country and it went into a period of decline. But after contributing to the prevention of an attempted coup by General José Sanjurjo, the CNT experienced a resurgence in support and anarchist deportees were permitted to return to Spain. Due to the slow, bureaucratic implementation of land reform and the regulation of trade unions by the new labour laws, workers' and peasants' dissatisfaction with the left-wing government increased.

In December 1932, when the possibility of a general strike by railway workers arose, the Catalan anarchist Joan Garcia Oliver began planning another insurrection. A premature explosion of stockpiled grenades in Barcelona made the authorities aware of the planned insurrection. By the time the insurrection broke out on 8 January 1933, leading anarchists had been arrested and the police were on high alert throughout the city, resulting in the uprising being suppressed by the following morning. Insurrections subsequently broke out throughout Catalonia, Valencia, Aragon and Andalusia, but they were likewise suppressed. In the Andalusian town of Casas Viejas, Assault Guards carried out a massacre against the town's peasantry, killing both insurgents and uninvolved bystanders.

In the suppression of the uprising, thousands of anarchists were imprisoned and dozens were killed. The insurrection provoked the treintistas to break off from the CNT and form the Opposition Unions. An investigation into the Casas Viejas incident found the government of Manuel Azaña culpable for the massacre, which caused it to lose support from the far-left and emboldened political opposition from the right-wing. A new right-wing government led by Alejandro Lerroux was subsequently elected, provoking the outbreak of the anarchist insurrection of December 1933.

== Background ==
Following the proclamation of the Second Spanish Republic in 1931, escalating class conflict made many Spanish workers sympathetic to anarchism, which agitated for a social revolution to overthrow capitalism and the state. In January 1932, a miners' strike in Central Catalonia escalated into a region-wide insurrection, during which workers proclaimed libertarian communism, before being suppressed by the Spanish Army. Dozens of members of the Confederación Nacional del Trabajo (CNT), an anarcho-syndicalist trade union centre, were subsequently arrested and deported. The suppression of the insurrection caused an internal conflict to break out within the CNT, as the moderate "treintistas" and radicals of the Iberian Anarchist Federation (FAI) blamed each other for the defeat. In March 1932, the National Committee of the CNT came under the control of the FAI, after the treintista Ángel Pestaña resigned as General Secretary of the CNT and was replaced by the revolutionary anarchist Manuel Rivas. Despite treintista attempts to reform the National Committee, under the influence of the FAI, the CNT began to move its attentions away from trade unionism towards insurrectionary anarchism.

The CNT attempted to protest against new labour laws, introduced by the government on 8 April 1932, which regulated trade union activities and established works councils to resolve industrial disputes. But the new laws effectively criminalised the CNT, which saw many of its members arrested and imprisoned, while its traditional methods of industrial action were restricted. The Andalusian regional branch of the CNT led a series of strike actions against the new labour laws, which led to it being suppressed and driven underground in the region. In June 1932, after a series of against the arrest and deportation of its activists, the CNT's unions were shut down throughout the country, causing the organisation to lose 30% of its members. But after an attempted coup against the Republic by General José Sanjurjo, in August 1932, the CNT held mass demonstrations throughout the country, contributing to the defeat of the coup. While the coup plotters were deported, the CNT received a boost for its role in its suppression. The coup attempt also accelerated the passage of numerous social reforms by the government, including the introduction of the eight-hour day and a comprehensive land reform programme. However, the slow, bureaucratic implementation of the latter caused discontent among the peasantry, who saw little of the changes they had expected. The bureaucratic attempt at land reform was criticised by the resurgent CNT and FAI, which called instead for revolutionary methods of land occupation and collectivisation.

Meanwhile, in Catalonia, 99.45% of Catalan voters had endorsed the promulgation of a Statute of Autonomy in a referendum. The CNT, which had previously maintained a close relationship with the Republican Left of Catalonia (ERC) and had supported the referendum as a voting bloc, became more openly critical of Catalan nationalism after the Statute was passed. For its part, the new Catalan government could not accept a situation of dual power between them and aimed to use its new powers to eliminate the CNT. The breakdown of relations between the CNT and ERC culminated with the 1932 Catalan regional election, when the CNT campaigned for anarchists to abstain from voting, resulting in turnout falling from 73% to 56%. By this time, the internal split within the CNT had escalated. The Local Federation of the CNT in Sabadell, led by the treintista Joan Peiró, refused to pay its union dues in protest against the influence of the FAI over the Catalan Regional Committee, provoking its expulsion from the CNT. Under the influence of the treintista Juan López Sánchez, local federations in Valencia and Huelva followed suit. The expulsion and marginalisation of treintista unions in the CNT resulted in the establishment of the Libertarian Syndicalist Federation (FSL), although leading treintistas cautioned against a complete split from the CNT. The Regional Federation of the CNT in Asturias attempted to call for dialogue between the two feuding factions, in order to find common ground between the FAI's insurrectionary position and the treintista emphasis on organisation, but the schism continued to deepen.

As land reform efforts were frustrated and political repression slowly de-escalated, by late 1932, the FAI was making plans for another insurrection. The treintistas feared that another uprising would shift Republican attentions away from preventing another military coup and back towards repressing the labour movement. One moderate member of the CNT National Committee, Horacio Prieto, warned that the organisation would not permit a second insurrection against the Republic. Fears of a second insurrection caused a stagnation in the CNT's activities, at a time when the FAI was itself organisationally inert. Many of its activists were still in prison, exiled or in hiding for their part in the Alt Llobregat insurrection. FAI activists Federica Montseny and Diego Abad de Santillán engaged in self-censorship, so as not to themselves becomes targets for repression. The only anarchist that freely organised was Valeriano Orobón Fernández, a member of neither faction of the CNT, who upheld industrial unionism and advocated for a popular front. But in the wake of the Sanjurjada, anarchist deportees were granted pardons by the Republican government and permitted to return from exile. In the final months of the year, the insurrectionary anarchists redoubled their organising efforts. This process culminated at a rally at the Palau de les Belles Arts, when Durruti gave a speech in which he predicted that another revolution was imminent. This provoked an immediate reaction from the Catalan government, which shut down Solidaridad Obrera and deployed armed police throughout Barcelona.

== Planning ==
=== Rail strike ===
On 1 December 1932, a rail strike broke out in Spain, after Minister of Public Works Indalecio Prieto refused to raise the wages of railway workers. Despite the government attempting to break the strike by threatening the striking workers with conscription, it continued throughout the month. The strike was backed by the CNT's Railway Industry National Federation (FNIF), which aimed to improve working conditions for its members. As the FNIF believed the strike would result in repression against the workers, it called for an insurrection to prevent the government from consolidating its force, in a course of action recommended by a national plenum of the CNT. Throughout the country, various regional committees of the CNT attempted to foment a revolutionary response to the strike. In Madrid, the Regional Committee of the CNT provided the railway workers' union with financial support, so that they could escalate the strike action into a general strike.

However, most railway unions were affiliated to the UGT, which advocated for negotiations with the government. The FNIF was also internally divided on the issue, with a majority of unions believing they were unprepared for a general strike: when the matter came to a vote, 35 unions sections voted in favour, while 36 were opposed. The CNT was ultimately forced to pull back from its plans, as the proposed general strike failed to manifest. When the civil governor of Zaragoza, Manuel Andrés Casaus, arrested the local leaders of the CNT on 1 January 1933, there was no response from the local anarchist movement. The Catalan Regional Defence Committee, under the influence of Joan Garcia Oliver, quickly grew frustrated with the reluctance of the CNT to take revolutionary action. Garcia Oliver called for the CNT to begin practicing "revolutionary gymnastics", a kind of insurrectionary action intended to prevent the consolidation of the Republican government's forces. Despite the rail strike falling through, plans for an insurrection went ahead.

=== In Catalonia ===
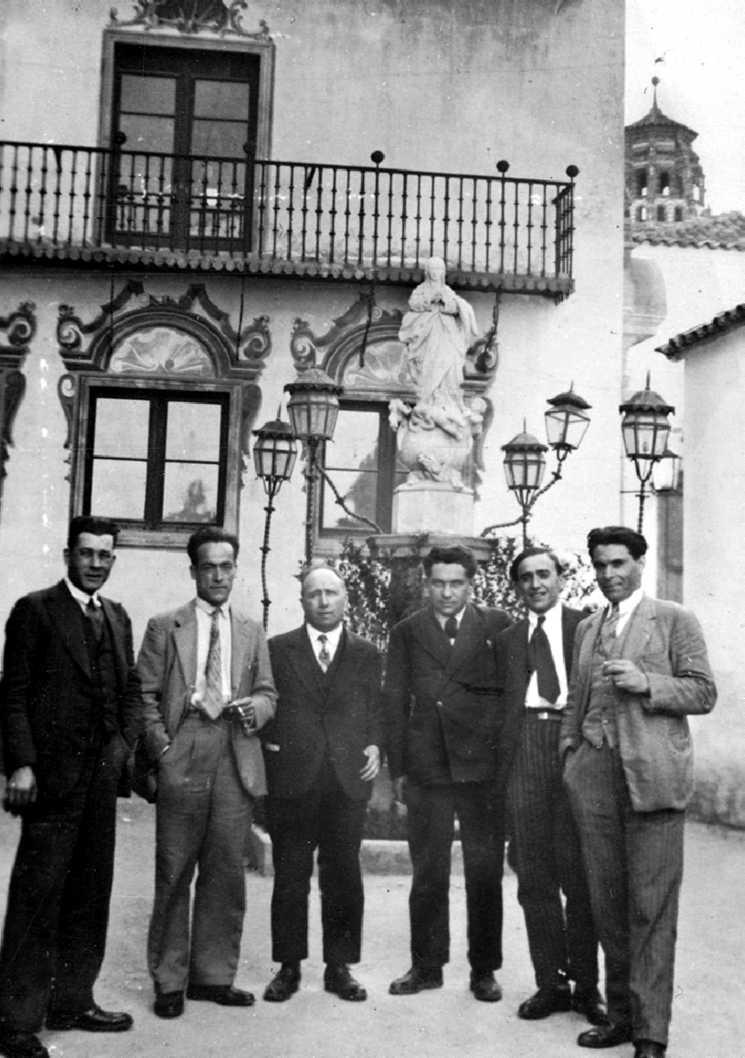
Joan Garcia Oliver (second from left), Francisco Ascaso (second from right) and Buenaventura Durruti (far-right) in Barcelona in 1931

In early December 1932, after the deported members of the Nosotros group had returned from exile, Joan Garcia Oliver called a meeting at his house. Among the attendees were Domingo and Francisco Ascaso, Buenaventura Durruti, Aurelio Fernández, Miguel García Vivancos, Gregorio Jover, Juliana López, Pepita Not, Antonio Ortiz, Ricardo Sanz and María Luisa Tejedor. Garcia Oliver informed them that the Catalan Regional Committee of the CNT had entrusted him with devising a plan for an insurrection. The group lamented that the CNT had wasted time with internal debates, while the state had strengthened itself. They believed that it would have been easy to carry out a social revolution during the first year of the republic, when the Assault Guard did not yet exist, the Spanish Army still lacked discipline and the Civil Guard was hated by much of the public. Seeking to prevent the further consolidation of the government's forces and inspired by the Alt Llobregat insurrection, the group resolved to bring about a revolutionary situation. The group believed that conditions were right for an insurrection, as the Republican government was facing an increasing backlash against its land reform programme, while in Catalonia, President Francesc Macià was dying. They also took issue with the government's use of works councils, advocated by Interior Minister Santiago Casares Quiroga and Agriculture Minister Marcelino Domingo, to resolve agricultural strikes in Andalusia.

In mid-December 1932, Garcia Oliver met with the Catalan Regional Committee and explained his plan to them. The committee was divided on the issue, with some arguing that the CNT ought to first focus on its internal issues with the treintistas before going on the offensive, while others considered making a move against the Spanish and Catalan governments to be an urgent matter. Despite the disagreements, the Committee adopted the plan and established a Catalan Revolutionary Committee. After excluding moderate members of the CNT and FAI, the committee came under the control of the Nosotros group. General Secretary Manuel Rivas, caught between his personal support for insurrection and his official opposition to it as a representative of the CNT, sent out contradictory messages about the insurrection to other regional committees. Rivas argued that if one section of the CNT rose up in revolt, the others were obliged to follow.

Barcelona was to be the centre of the insurrection. Guerrillas operating in the city centre would occupy the telephone exchange, radio stations and Catalan government buildings, including the Palace of the Generalitat, Captaincy General and Police Prefecture. Once revolutionaries seized Ràdio Barcelona, they would transmit a call for revolutionaries throughout the country to rise up. The rest of the city was divided into three zones of operation, in which the revolutionaries aimed to prevent government forces from leaving their barracks:

- Garcia Oliver was responsible for operations in the south of the city. In Sants, his targets were the Assault Guard barracks on the Plaça d'Espanya and the Campsa petroleum warehouses in El Poble-sec; in L'Hospitalet de Llobregat, the El Prat Airport; in Hostafrancs, the Carabineros barracks on Carrer de Tarragona; in Les Corts, the infantry barracks at Pedralbes; in Eixample, La Model prison; in El Raval, the Drassanes barracks and the border police barracks on Carrer de Sant Pau.
- Francisco Ascaso was responsible for operations in the north of the city. His aim was to besiege the artillery and infantry barracks in Sant Andreu, the artillery barracks on Avinguda d'Icària in Sant Martí de Provençals, and the infantry barracks at the Parc de la Ciutadella.
- Buenaventura Durruti was responsible for operations in the west of the city. He was to attack the Civil Guard barracks on the Travessera de Gràcia, the Civil Guard Barracks in Navas, and the Carabineros barracks on Carrer de Lepant in Horta.

=== In Andalusia ===
During the planning process, Durruti was dispatched to the province of Cádiz to meet the Andalusian Regional Committee of the CNT in Jerez de la Frontera and discuss the planned revolt with them. Police informants leaked information about the planned meeting, but the police were given no information about its exact location, so were unable to prevent it going ahead, despite patrols of the provincial borders. The Andalusians planned to carry out the revolt once they received news that Catalan revolutionaries had seized the radio station; they would not go into action if the revolt in Barcelona failed. They established an Andalusian Revolutionary Committee, headed by Vicente Ballester of the CNT, Rafael Peña of the FAI and Miguel Arcas of the Libertarian Youth. They were to orchestrate the uprising in Seville, where they would take over Radio Sevilla and call for other local committees throughout the region to revolt.

== Insurrection ==
=== Uprising in Barcelona ===
The revolt did not initially have an agreed-upon date, having been scheduled for an uncertain time in early January 1933. But on 5 January 1933, there was an explosion on Carrer de Mallorca, in the neighbourhood El Clot. The explosion had taken place at a grenade-manufacturing workshop ran by Hilario Esteban and Ignasi Meler. This alerted the police, who subsequently uncovered a stockpile of 185 bombs in Sants and arrested the CNT militants suspected of manufacturing the explosives. Suspecting that the anarchists were planning something, the police preventatively carried out mass arrests against members of the CNT. When Interior Minister Santiago Casares Quiroga was made aware of the investigation, he immediately attributed it to the FAI. Prime minister Manuel Azaña himself remarked that "the police in Spain, as well as useless, are unnecessary: when there are bombs, they explode by themselves, and when there is a conspiracy, the conspirators tell everybody".

With their cover blown, the Catalan anarchists decided to accelerate their plans and set 8 January as the date to begin the insurrection. The plan was to first incapacitate government forces at the Police Prefecture on Via Laietana and at the Civil Government building on the Pla de Palau. Between 21:00 and 22:00, these buildings would be blown up by autogenous welding tubes filled with dynamite, signalling to insurgent groups to begin their attacks against their selected targets using pistols and grenades, while revolutionary patrols were carried out in taxis. On 8 January 1933, at 08:00, two bricklayers pulled a small handcart loaded with bricks, cement and plaster, concealing two improvised explosive devices, onto Carrer dels Mercaders. They slipped into the sewers with the explosives, each of which weighed 90 kilogrammes, and carried them to their targets. They easily managed to placed one underneath the Police Prefecture, but struggled getting to the Civil Government building, as the sewer underneath the Pla de Palau was only 1.5 metres high and its waters were 60 centimetres deep. It took them over 8 hours to place the bombs, after which they each split up to detonate the respective devices.

By the time the insurrection was due to begin, the government had already put its own plans in place. Casares Quiroga informed Azaña that they expected the anarchist insurrection to break out that evening and had advised the army to act accordingly. While the authorities prepared for the uprising, Azaña casually went out for a walk in the Guadarrama Pass. Preempting the outbreak of disorder, the Spanish Army and police forces occupied positions where attacks were to predicted to happen and arrested CNT leaders on sight. Joan Garcia Oliver and Gregorio Jover were arrested in their car. Although they were armed, they decided not to resist, so as not to cause problems for the planned operation. They and other detainees were taken to the Police Prefecture, which they knew was due to blow up. They thought that, if they did not die in the explosion, they could be of use in the occupation of the building. At 22:00, the bomb underneath the Prefecture exploded, but the one underneath the Civil Government building failed to detonate. Due to the position of the Prefecture, which was further back from the street than other buildings, the explosion did not reach its foundations and the building remained standing. Nevertheless, the detainees reported what felt to them like an earthquake, while the police, thinking the building was under attack, ran out into the streets in their pajamas or underwear.

Insurrection subsequently broke out in the province of Barcelona, but the police had already taken preventative measures to suppress any uprising. When Durruti led the assault against the Civil Guard barracks in Gràcia, his detachment found that the police had already mobilised, having been on high-alert since the workshop explosion in El Clot. Neighbourhood defense committees clashed with the police throughout the Catalan capital. Sporadic fighting took place in La Rambla, where the union leader Joaquín Blanco Martínez was killed. But by the early hours of 9 January, the insurrection was already over in Barcelona. The preemptive arrest of Garcia Oliver had neutralised the uprising. By the end of the uprising, 20 members of the FAI had been killed in the street fighting. The government declared a state of emergency, bringing Barcelona under armed occupation. Many of the insurgents fled into hiding, attempting to save themselves from arrest and maintain possession of their weaponry. People were detained throughout Catalonia, causing overcrowding in jail cells. Police routinely beat and tortured arrestees, including Garcia Oliver, which drew vocal criticism from Federica Montseny. One anarchist activist, José Guillamón, died while being beaten by police. Rumours also spread that Ascaso and Durruti had been assassinated, but a delegation of lawyers managed to confirm that they had not been harmed.

=== Insurrections in Catalonia, Valencia and Aragon ===
In reaction to the uprising in Barcelona, unions throughout the country rushed to call general strikes and proclaim libertarian communism. Even after the suppression of the uprising in Barcelona, some isolated attacks were carried out against barracks throughout Catalonia. Activists proclaimed libertarian communism in the suburban towns of Cerdanyola del Vallès and Ripollet, where factory occupations took place, resulting in the deaths of two militants who attempted to occupy a factory of the Uralita Group. Fighting also broke out in Terrassa, where rioting lasted for six days. In Lleida, militants attempted to assault the La Panera barracks, during which 4 militants were killed and 31 more were arrested. The insurrection in Lleida lasted for three days. According to the Valencian anarchist historian Josep Peirats, the Catalan Defense Cadres of the CNT-FAI had been poorly armed and put most of their hopes for success on the possibility of intervention by sympathisers in the military or the materialisation of strike actions by industrial workers, neither of which happened.

In the wake of the uprising in Catalonia, insurrection broke out the province of Valencia, which saw violence continue through the month of January into early February. Insurgents proclaimed libertarian communism in the towns of Bétera, Bugarra, Pedralba, and Riba-roja de Túria. In these towns, rebels disarmed the Civil Guard, attacked town halls and burned property registries. Four militants were killed during the uprising in Bétera. Violence also broke out in the Valencian towns of Benaguasil and Utiel, as well as the Aragonese towns of Belver de Cinca and Robres, in the province of Uesca.

=== In Andalusia ===
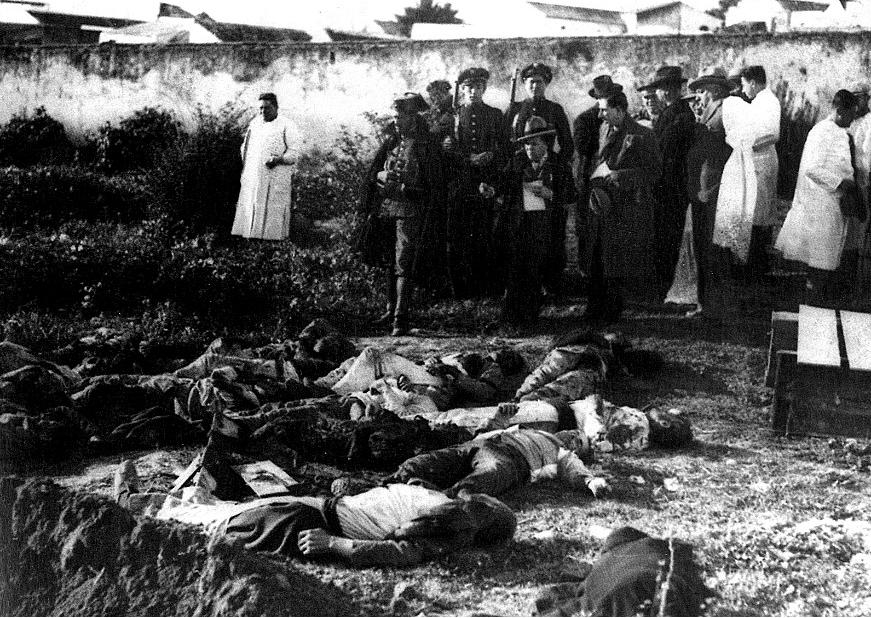
The bodies of people killed during the Casas Viejas massacre

On 10 January, the insurrection spread to Andalusia, where extreme poverty had driven many peasants to rebel, in hopes of taking land for themselves. Anarchists rebelled in the provincial capitals of Cádiz, Málaga, and Seville. In the latter, armed clashes broke out between insurgents and police; rebels attacked company property and assaulted managers. In the province of Cádiz, uprisings occurred in the towns of Alcalá de los Gazules, Sanlúcar de Barrameda, Arcos de la Frontera, Medina-Sidonia, Los Barrios, Chiclana de la Frontera, Jérez de la Frontera, Paterna de Rivera and San Fernando. In the province of Seville, insurrections also broke out in La Rinconada and Utrera. However, the government had already prepared for an uprising in Andalusia, so it was able to quickly put down the rebellions.

Captain Manuel Rojas Feijespán and his company of Assault Guards were immediately transferred from Madrid to Jérez in order to suppress the uprising. Upon arrival, they discovered that the telephone lines to Casas Viejas had been cut. On 11 January 1933, the villagers of Casas Viejas proclaimed libertarian communism and stormed the local barracks. Led by Captain Rojas, the Civil Guard and Assault Guard occupied the town and besieged a shack where some peasant rebels had hidden. After hours of shooting, the Guards set fire to the shack and shot at the people that tried to escape. Rojas then ordered the round up of other suspected insurgents and executed them. By the time the Assault Guards left the town, they had killed 19 men, 2 women and a child.

== Aftermath ==
=== Reactions from the CNT ===
On 9 January 1933, the Madrid newspaper CNT published an editorial by its editor Avelino González Mallada, who disowned the insurrection because of its conspiratorial character, stating that revolution ought to be a worker-led uprising by the whole of the CNT. The following day, the newspaper re-characterised the insurrection as a rebellious gesture by the working class. On 10 January, the National Committee of the CNT declared the insurrection an event of "purely anarchist significance" which had not had the direct involvement of the organisation, although out of a sense of solidarity, they refused to outright condemn it. Members of the secretariat of the International Workers' Association (IWA), including Alexander Schapiro and Eusebi Carbó, concurred with this opinion, declaring that the success of a revolution is more dependent on mass support than the quantity of arms and explosives.

By 11 January, the CNT newspaper had performed a complete U-turn, blaming the insurrection on political repression by the left-wing government, rather than on the revolutionary minority, and predicting that insurrectionary actions would continue so long as repression continued. At a meeting of the Madrid Regional Committee in late January, Mallada defended his initial editorial and called for independent attacks to be dropped, believing that the working class as a whole ought to determine when a revolution take place. Nevertheless, the publication of the editorial only a day after the uprising had upset most of the delegates, who attributed the timing to nervousness over the situation. By the following month, the dispute over the editorial led to the resignation of Mallada and most of the editorial board.

The treintista faction considered the insurrection to be another example that the FAI had imposed an anarchist dictatorship within the CNT. Many unions of the CNT, worried that their subscription payments were being used to fund insurrections rather than union organising, stopped paying their union dues. The treintista unions demanded that the revolutionary anarchists be purged from the CNT, proclaiming that "play[ers] of revolutionary chess" ought to take individual responsibility for their insurrections and not use others' money to fund them. The torrent of complaints forced the Catalan Regional Committee of the CNT to call a meeting, and on 5 March 1933, they expelled the treintistas from the CNT. Local unions in Sabadell, Valencia and Huelva, representing 60,000 members, subsequently withdrew from the organisation, forming a new trade union centre, which they called the Opposition Unions. Despite the split, the Catalan CNT continued to count 278 unions consisting of 300,000 members, with local branches in 20 comarques and 3 provinces.

While in hiding, Durruti attempted to defend the insurrectionaries from accusations that they had attempted putsch and that they were Blanquists and Trotskyists, proclaiming that revolutionary anarchists rejected the seizure of political power. He insisted that their efforts had been necessary, as a way to prevent the government from consolidating power. He also declared that the insurrection had been an attempt by the working class to carry out a revolution "for the people and by the people". He concluded by admitting that, although they had not yet achieved a revolution, "that it has to be made by moving, by going forward". From La Model prison, Garcia Oliver made a similar argument. He insisted that the insurrection had not been in vain, as he believed that incidents like the one in Casas Viejas made the death of liberal democracy inevitable.

=== Towards another insurrection ===
Although the insurrection was only carried out by a small revolutionary minority, it resulted in prison sentences for many more people. Catalan police chief Miquel Badia immediately set out to catch Ascaso and Durruti, who managed to hide out for two months. While Garcia Oliver remained in La Model prison, in early April 1933, Ascaso and Durruti were arrested in Seville. Together with Vicente Pérez Combina and Paulino Díez, Ascaso and Durruti were imprisoned without trial in El Puerto de Santa María. They were held in unsanitary conditions, in a prison where tuberculosis was common among inmates. The four were placed in solitary confinement and were allowed to write to family members only once per week, although their letters would be opened and censored by the authorities. They protested the restrictions, as they still did not know what they had been charged with. Durruti was able to smuggle letters out, publicising reports from Díez, who had become sick due to malnourishment. Members of the Seville CNT were also prevented from seeing them, which they also attempted to protest. The CNT organised a series of political demonstrations, demanding the release of the anarchist prisoners, the legalisation of syndicalist unions, the recognition of freedom of association and the repeal of the labour laws of 8 April 1932 and the Law of the Defence of the Republic. On 9 and 10 May, the CNT carried out a general strike, which it characterised as a warning to the Republican government. In late May, the CNT's lawyer Eduardo Barriobero met with Interior Minister Santiago Casares Quiroga and attempted to encourage him to release the more than 6,000 anarchist prisoners, who had been classified as "governmental prisoners". Casares Quiroga gave Barriobero his "word of honour" that he would release them within days, but as months went by, no prisoners were released.

By this time, the CNT itself had undergone a split and many of its unions and publications were still banned. In June, police raided CNT branch offices in Barcelona and Madrid, arrested the occupants on charges of holding illegal gatherings. In the Spanish capital, the Assault Guards surrounded the Local Federation building, arrested 250 members as they arrived and detained them in the General Directorate of Security. In their jail cells, the detainees reportedly insulted the government and sang The Internationale. In the Catalan capital, CNT members were tortured and their membership cards were destroyed by police. In Seville, the provincial governor ordered the mass imprisonment of CNT members.

In April 1933, a formal inquiry into the Casas Viejas incident found Rojas directly culpable for the massacre, while Azaña, at the head of the chain of command, was also condemned for his role. Numerous socialists, including Francisco Largo Caballero, began to distance themselves from the republican government, while public sentiment began to turn towards the right-wing. The state's conduct in Casas Viejas drew increasingly vocal criticisms both from the radical left and the right-wing. In the Cortes of Deputies, the progress of reform slowed, with the passage of anti-clerical proposals and a land reform bill stalling. The right-wing opposition, led by José María Gil-Robles of the CEDA and Alejandro Lerroux of the Radical Republican Party (PRR), were emboldened to attack the government. Meanwhile, fascism began to organise itself in Spain, with José Antonio Primo de Rivera establishing the Falange Española. As the right-wing grew in power, the left-wing government passed a new public order law, which gave the government even more powers to suppress dissent. The Unión General de Trabajadores (UGT), usually aligned with the Socialist Party, increasingly began to rebel against the government. UGT leader Francisco Largo Caballero turned towards the far-left, while many young members gravitated towards the Communist Party of Spain (PCE).

By June 1933, the Azaña government had lost its parliamentary majority. On 12 September 1933, President Alcalá Zamora dissolved the Azaña government; its last act was to apply a new vagrancy law to anarchist prisoners. When Lerroux failed to form a new government on 2 October, the President dissolved the Cortes and called a general election. For the remainder of 1933, the CNT continued escalating its actions against the government, building towards another insurrection, which would take place following the election of a new right-wing government under Alejandro Lerroux. On 8 December, another insurrection was carried out by anarchists in La Rioja and Aragon, which threatened social order in Zaragoza for a number of days, before it was suppressed.

== Bibliography ==
- Casanova, Julián (2005). "On the road to insurrection". In Preston, Paul (ed.). Anarchism, the Republic and Civil War in Spain: 1931–1939. Translated by Dowling, Andrew; Pollok, Graham. Routledge. pp. 64–83. ISBN 0-415-32095-X.
- Herrerín, Ángel (2020). "To the Barricades! (May 1932–December 1933)". The Road to Anarchy: The CNT under the Spanish Second Republic (1931–1936). Sussex Academic Press. pp. 93–148. ISBN 9781789760316.
- Kern, Robert W. (1978). Red Years/Black Years: A Political History of Spanish Anarchism, 1911-1937. Institute for the Study of Human Issues. ISBN 0-915980-54-1. LCCN 77-13595.
- Paz, Abel (2006) [1996]. "The insurrectional cycle". Durruti in the Spanish Revolution. Translated by Morse, Chuck. Edinburgh: AK Press. pp. 289–297. ISBN 1-904859-50-X. LCCN 2006920974. OCLC 482919277.
