= Opposition Unions =

Spanish syndicalist union

- Sindicats d'Oposició
- Merged into: National Confederation of Labour
- Formation: January 1933; 93 years ago
- Dissolved: May 1936; 90 years ago
- Type: Trade union federation
- Headquarters: Sabadell, Catalonia
- Members: 60,000 (1933)
- Leaders: Joan Peiró and Juan López Sánchez

The Opposition Unions (Spanish: Sindicatos de Oposición; Catalan: Sindicats d'Oposició) were a Spanish syndicalist trade union federation which broke away from the anarchist-led National Confederation of Labour (CNT) in 1932. Established by the reformist faction of the CNT, the Opposition Unions were largely based in Andalusia, Catalonia and Valencia, and counted 60,000 members. The organisation was affiliated with the Libertarian Syndicalist Federation (LSF) and joined the Workers' Alliance alongside the General Workers' Union (UGT). In 1936, it merged back into the CNT and its more reformist ideas were eventually adopted by the anarchists.

== Background ==
After the proclamation of the Second Spanish Republic in 1931, the National Confederation of Labour (CNT) split into two factions: a moderate, reformist faction, which included the leadership of the CNT; and a radical, insurrectionary anarchist faction, which was organised around the Iberian Anarchist Federation (FAI). As the unions of the CNT were functionally autonomous, the FAI was able to use them to propose revolutionary strike actions, without permission from the CNT leadership. Through this strategy, the FAI slowly gained control of the Catalan regional branch of the CNT and its newspaper Solidaridad Obrera. As the FAI gained influence over the CNT, thirty of the CNT's leading members issued a manifesto in protest against the FAI's infiltration tactics. These "treintistas" (English: thirtyists), led by CNT General Secretary Ángel Pestaña and Solidaridad Obrera editor Joan Peiró, gained support from local unions in Valencia and small towns in Catalonia.

The split between the treintistas and the faistas escalated following the Alt Llobregat insurrection, which the treintistas had condemned. Federica Montseny and Joan García Oliver publicly denounced Pestaña for not calling a general strike in solidarity with the CNT members who had been imprisoned and deported in the wake of the insurrection. Many CNT members, including hundreds imprisoned in La Model, demanded his resignation. In March 1932, he resigned as General Secretary of the CNT and was replaced by the revolutionary anarchist Manuel Rivas. By the following month, as a massive wave of CNT-led strikes engulfed Catalonia, the Catalan branch of the CNT held a regional plenum in Sabadell, where 250,000 workers were represented by 300 delegates. The April 1932 plenum elected the FAI member Alejandro Gilabert as the Regional Secretary of the CNT in Catalonia, replacing the treintista Emilio Mira. With this decision, the last reformist influence had been removed from the leadership of the Catalan CNT.

== Split ==
Despite the changes to the regional leadership, the Local Federation of the CNT in Sabadell remained under the influence of the treintistas, who attempted to use the local branch to neutralise anarchist influence over the CNT. In a confidential report to the International Workers' Association (IWA), Alexander Schapiro claimed that the treintistas were attempting to use the Sabadell Local Federation to retake control of the Catalan Regional Committee and eventually the National Committee. By September 1932, the Sabadell Local Federation was withholding its union dues from the CNT, hoping to force the regional committee to condemn the influence of the FAI over the organisation. On 24 September 1932, the Catalan Regional Committee expelled the Sabadell Local Federation. The Sabadell Federation gained the support of the local federations in the Catalan towns of Badalona, Igualada, Manresa, Mataró and Valls, as well as the Valencian cities of Alcoy and Valencia. Local unions in Valencia withheld union dues in protest against the FAI's involvement in the Prisoners' Aid Committee and were consequently expelled by the Levante Regional Federation. The FAI responded to the split by carrying out a series of armed attacks against treintista unions. By the following year, a majority of the CNT's Valencian unions and a significant minority of its Catalan unions had broken away from the organisation.

In January 1933, the breakaway unions came together to form a new syndicalist organisation, in opposition to the CNT. Together representing 60,000 workers, the unions established their own trade union centre, which they called the Opposition Unions (Spanish: Sindicatos de Oposición; Catalan: Sindicats d'Oposició). The new organisation established Regional Committees in Andalusia, Catalonia and Valencia, where they had the strongest base. In Catalonia alone, the Opposition Unions counted 35,000 members; these were predomintantly Catalan skilled workers and white-collar workers, in contrast with the CNT, which consisted largely of unskilled workers from outside of Catalonia. Despite the split, the Opposition Unions intended to eventually reconcile with and merge back into the CNT.

Not long after, Pestaña was expelled from the CNT Metalworkers' Union, by a vote of twelve branches against one; even his own section, the machinists' union, vote against him. In spite of his expulsion, Pestaña continued to uphold his position on gradualism. In January 1933, he established the Libertarian Syndicalist Federation (FSL), which acted as the political organisation of the Opposition Unions, modelled after the FAI's own relationship with the CNT. Joan Peiró and Juan López Sánchez became the main thought leaders of the Opposition Unions. Their position was damaged in late 1933, when Pestaña established his own political party, the Syndicalist Party (PS). After Pestaña's exit from the union, Peiró and López made reunification with the CNT the organisation's main objective.

== Workers' Alliance ==
On 16 December 1933, the Opposition Unions came together with the Unión General de Trabajadores (UGT), the Syndicalist Party (PS), the Spanish Socialist Workers' Party (PSOE), the Workers' and Peasants' Bloc (BOC), the Socialist Union of Catalonia (USC), the Communist Left of Spain (ICE) and the Unió de Rabassaires (UR) to establish the Workers' Alliance. On behalf of the Opposition Unions, Progreso Alfarache, Manuel Mascarell and Joan Peiró signed the constitution of the new alliance. Every organisation of the Catalan working class, with the exception of the CNT and the Communist Party of Spain (PCE), was represented in the alliance. Only the Asturian branch of the CNT signed up to the Alliance.

== Merger ==
By 1936, the Opposition Unions counted only 40,000 members; their attempts to undermine the influence of the FAI over the CNT had been unsuccessful. Meanwhile, the CNT had made ending the split one of its main priorities. In order to build an understanding with the Opposition Unions, the CNT moved towards the formation of a Revolutionary Alliance with the UGT, but the latter was initially indifferent to the proposal. In May 1936, the Opposition Unions formally rejoined the CNT. Delegates of the Opposition Unions attended the CNT's Zaragoa Congress, with the aim of resolving the split between the two organisations and establishing a revolutionary alliance with the UGT. The motion for a revolutionary alliance was supported by the faista Joan Garcia Oliver, although he also defended the FAI from accusations of infiltration from the Opposition Unions. The reformist faction of the CNT was ultimately defeated by the revolutionary anarchists at the Congress, which adopted a resolution on the implemntation of libertarian communism, leading to the resignation of General Secretary Horacio Prieto. According to historians Pierre Broué and Émile Temime, the treintista line eventually won acceptance within the CNT following the 1936 Spanish general election. At the outbreak of the Spanish Revolution of 1936, when a plenum of the CNT in Catalonia voted against pursuing the implementation of libertarian communism, Garcia Oliver complained that the reformist line had been pushed by faistas themselves, while the treintistas had been absent. The Opposition Union leaders Joan Peiró and Juan López Sánchez later joined the Spanish government under Francisco Largo Caballero, alongside the faistas Joan Garcia Oliver and Federica Montseny.

== Bibliography ==
- Alba, Victor; Schwartz, Stephen (1988). "From the Workers' and Peasants' Bloc to the Workers' Alliance". Spanish Marxism versus Soviet Communism: A History of the P.O.U.M. Transaction Publishers. pp. 20–84. doi:10.4324/9781315130118-3. ISBN 0-88738-198-7.
- Christie, Stuart (2008). We, the Anarchists: A Study of the Iberian Anarchist Federation (FAI). AK Press. ISBN 9781904859758. LCCN 2007939202.
- Corkett, Tom (2012). "Unity as Rivalry: The Spanish Anarcho-syndicalists and Socialists on the Eve of the Civil War". Politics, Religion & Ideology. 13 (3): 267–287. doi:10.1080/21567689.2012.701187.
- Ealham, Chris (2002). "The crisis of organized labour: The battle for hegemony in the Barcelona workers' movement, 1930–6". In Smith, Angel (ed.). Red Barcelona: Social Protest and Labour Mobilization in the Twentieth Century. Routledge. pp. 88–107. doi:10.4324/9780203219379-5. ISBN 0-203-21937-6.
- Esenwein, George (2023). "Spain in Revolt: The Revolutionary Legacy of Anarchism and Anarcho-Syndicalism". In van der Linden, Marcel (ed.). The Cambridge History of Socialism. Cambridge University Press. pp. 380–410. ISBN 978-1-108-61133-6.
- Getman-Eraso, Jordi (2011). "Too Young to Fight: Anarchist Youth Groups and the Spanish Second Republic". The Journal of the History of Childhood and Youth. 4 (2): 282–307. doi:10.1353/hcy.2011.0019.
- Jones, Norman (2012). "Regionalism and revolution in Catalonia". In Preston, Paul (ed.). Revolution and War in Spain, 1931-1939. Routledge. pp. 85–112. doi:10.4324/9780203222225-5. ISBN 9780203222225.
- Oyón, José Luis (2009). "The split of a working-class city: urban space, immigration and anarchism in inter-war Barcelona, 1914–1936". Urban History. 36 (1): 86–112. doi:10.1017/S0963926808005993. hdl:2117/19245.
- Tavera i Garcia, Susanna (2012). "Anarchism or anarchisms? The history of a heterogeneous revolutionary deployment, 1930-1938". Catalan Historical Review (5): 101–116. ISSN 2013-4088.
