= Antonio Ejarque =

Spanish trade unionist

General Secretary of the CNT in the Interior
- In office 1947 – 22 September 1947
- Preceded by: Enric Marco Nadal
- Succeeded by: Manuel Villar Mingo

Personal details
- Born: Antonio Ejarque Pina; 25 March 1905 Zaragoza, Aragon
- Died: 22 August 1950 (aged 45) Paris, France
- Citizenship: Spanish Republic
- Party: CNT

Military service
- Allegiance: (Second Spanish Republic) Republican faction
- Branch/service: Spanish Republican Army
- Years of service: 1937-1939
- Unit: 25th Division
- Battles/wars: Spanish Civil War: Battle of Teruel

Antonio Ejarque Pina (25 March 1905 in Zaragoza – 22 August 1950 in Paris) was an Aragonese anarchist.

== Biography ==
A metalworker by profession, he was a member of the National Confederation of Labor (Spanish: Confederación Nacional del Trabajo, CNT) from an early age. In August 1930 he was elected chairman of the CNT trade union commission in Zaragoza. In 1931 he was delegate of the Metal Union of Zaragoza to the CNT's Madrid Congress and member of the Regional Committee of Aragon. He was also in charge of the administration of the libertarian magazine Cultura y Acción. He was a member of the National Revolutionary Committee of the CNT during the January 1933 revolution with Isaac Puente, Buenaventura Durruti and Cipriano Mera. He was also a part of the revolutionary committee that spearheaded the Anarchist insurrection of December 1933. He was subsequently imprisoned in Burgos until April 1934.

The coup of 18 July 1936 surprised him in Zaragoza, where he opposed the intentions of Miguel Chueca Cuartero to claim weapons from the civilian governor and immediately attack the military coup in the barracks. He managed to escape the city and move to the Republican zone. In March 1937 he signed the revolutionary unionist pact between the CNT and UGT Regional Committees of Aragon. At the same time, he marched to the front as political commissar of the 25th Division led by Miguel García Vivancos. In October 1938 he was appointed commissar of the 16th Army Corps, and drafted a report after the Battle of Teruel denouncing the communist maneuvers to prevent his division from supplying itself with weapons.

At the end of the Spanish Civil War he was taken prisoner and interned in the Albatera concentration camp. Released later, he participated in the clandestine activities of the CNT. In May 1946, he was appointed foreign delegate of the National Alliance of Democratic Forces. At the beginning of 1947 he moved to France, where he developed liaison tasks between the members of the CNT in the interior and those in exile. For a few months he lived in Paris as a representative of the ANFD. That same year he was elected the position of General Secretary of the CNT in the interior, replacing Enric Marco Nadal. However, he was arrested by the police in Madrid on 22 September 1947, and replaced as General Secretary by Manuel Villar Mingo. He was imprisoned in the Ocaña prison, from which he managed to escape on 8 May 1948, along with eleven other detainees. He fled to France, where he continued to dedicate himself to anarcho-syndicalist activities. In 1950 he was elected delegate of the National Committee of the CNT abroad and undersecretary of the National Subcommittee of the possibilist group, which supported collaboration with the Spanish Republican government in exile.

== Bibliography ==
- Álvarez Fernández, José Ignacio (2007). Memoria y trauma en los testimonios de la represión franquista (in Spanish). Barcelona: Anthropos.
- Casanova, Julián (2010). The Spanish Republic and Civil War. Cambridge University Press.
- Herrerín López, Ángel (2004). La CNT durante el franquismo: clandestinidad y exilio (1939-1975) (in Spanish). Siglo XXI de España. ISBN 9788432311529.
- Kelsey, Graham (1991). Anarchosyndicalism, Libertarian Communism and the State. The CNT in Zaragoza and Aragon 1930-1937. Kluwer Academic Publishers.
- Jáuregui, Fernando; Vega, Pedro (2007). Crónica del antifranquismo (in Spanish). Barcelona: Planeta. ISBN 978-84-08-07456-4.
- Téllez, Antonio (1992). Sabaté. Guerrilla urbana en España (1945-1960) (in Spanish). Barcelona: Editorial Virus.
- Téllez, Antonio (1996). La Red de Evasión del Grupo Ponzán. Anarquistas en la guerra secreta contra el franquismo y el nazismo (1936-1944) (in Spanish). Barcelona: Editorial Virus.
