= Manuel Rivas (trade unionist) =

Spanish trade unionist

General Secretary of the Confederación Nacional del Trabajo
- In office March 1932 – January 1933
- Preceded by: Ángel Pestaña
- Succeeded by: Miguel Yoldi

Personal details
- Born: Seville, Andalusia, Spain
- Died: Seville, Andalusia, Spain
- Party: Communist Party of Spain (from 1939)
- Other political affiliations: Confederación Nacional del Trabajo (c. 1920–1939); Iberian Anarchist Federation (1931–1939)
- Occupation: Entertainer, construction worker

Manuel Rivas was a Spanish trade unionist. After the fall of the dictatorship of Primo de Rivera and proclamation of the Second Spanish Republic, he became a leading figure in the ranks of the Confederación Nacional del Trabajo (CNT), as leader of the Barcelona construction workers' union and as a member of the national Committee. Following the Alt Llobregat insurrection, Rivas replaced Ángel Pestaña as General Secretary of the CNT, which marked the rise of the influence of the Iberian Anarchist Federation (FAI) within the organisation. As the CNT's defense secretary, Rivas oversaw the union's participation in the anarchist insurrection of January 1933. After the Spanish Civil War, he became increasingly critical of the CNT and abandoned anarchism in favour of Marxism-Leninism.

== Biography ==
=== Early life and trade union activism ===
Manuel Rivas was born in the Andalusian city of Seville. He moved to Barcelona to work in show business, through which he joined the entertainment union of the Confederación Nacional del Trabajo (CNT). During the years of the dictatorship of Primo de Rivera, Rivas fled the country to Portugal. He settled in Porto, where he worked in commerce and acted as a correspondent for anarchist magazines.

After the fall of the dictatorship in June 1930, he returned to the country and joined the National Committee of the CNT. Together with Ángel Pestaña and Progreso Alfarache, he organised the union's 1931 Congress. After the proclamation of the Second Spanish Republic, he joined the Iberian Anarchist Federation (FAI) and became a leader in the CNT's construction workers' union in Barcelona. Due to rising levels of unemployment in the construction sector, he ran the union effectively as an unemployed workers' union. Throughout the time of the republic, he continuously visited imprisoned construction workers, especially after a series of strikes by the CNT.

In January 1932, Rivas was arrested and imprisoned following the Alt Llobregat insurrection. In March 1932, Rivas replaced Pestaña as the general secretary of the CNT. He presided over a new National Committee which consisted largely of revolutionary anarchists from the affinity groups of the FAI, including Marcos Alcón, José Ramos, Ricardo Sanz and Miguel Terrén. This change in leadership marked the beginning of a decline of the influence of the treintista faction in the CNT, although it did not lead to an immediate break with them. In mid-April 1932, Rivas and Alcón denounced a smear campaign against Pestaña by Joan Montseny, which they characterised as a "divisive and motivated by personal hatred which will only serve to weaken out movement".

=== Insurrection ===
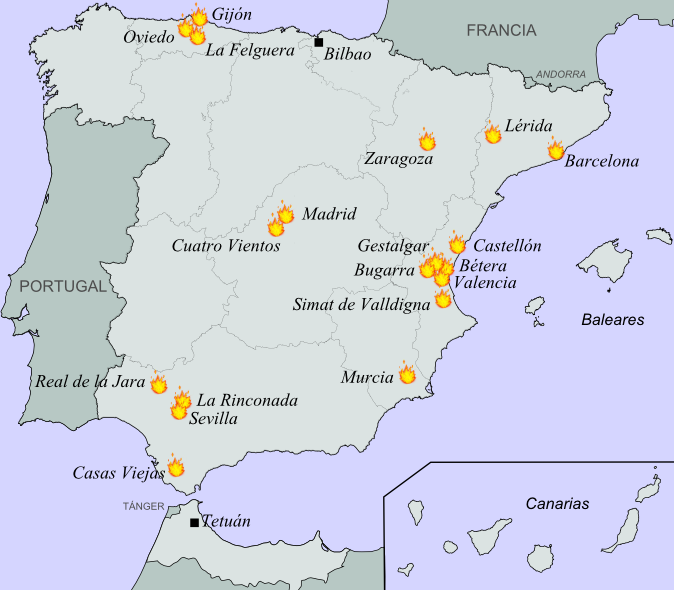
Map of uprisings during the anarchist insurrection of January 1933

Alongside his position of general secretary, Rivas was also appointed as national defense secretary of the CNT. From this position, he oversaw the anarchist insurrection of January 1933. The insurrection had been planned by members of the Catalan Regional Defense Committee. Upon meeting with the National Committee, they were surprised that it wanted to call off the insurrection, but they pressed forward with their plans anyway.

Rivas found himself in a conflicted position: as a representative of the CNT National Committee, he officially opposed the insurrectionary movement, but as a revolutionary anarchist, he personally supported it. His revolutionary tendencies ultimately overruled his critical judgement of the insurrection, so he agreed to support the insurrection, incorrectly believing that the Catalan Regional Defense Committee was acting on behalf of the Catalan branch of the CNT. Rivas sent out a circular to all the regional organisations of the CNT, declaring that Catalonia was in rebellion and calling on the other regions to follow suit. Although he signed the telegram using only his name, not the title of general secretary, the regional committees assumed he was acting on behalf of the National Committee. The regional committees in Valencia and Andalusia thus followed suit, calling an uprising, with many of their defense groups proclaiming libertarian communism.

He was again arrested and imprisoned for his role in the insurrection. In 1934, he formed part of a commission, together with Francisco Ascaso and Joan García Oliver, that asked prime minister Alejandro Lerroux to extend amnesty to CNT prisoners. He also participated in the 1936 Congress of the CNT.

=== War and exile ===
During the Spanish Civil War, he was a staunch supporter of Joan García Oliver, who served as the secretary of the Central Committee of Antifascist Militias of Catalonia (CCMA), then later as minister of justice in the Spanish government. In July 1937, Rivas served on the National Committee of the CNT as the delegate for the entertainment industry.

After the war, Rivas fled to Mexico, where he defected from the anarchist movement. In the 1940s, he proclaimed his support for the Spanish Republican government in exile and turned towards Marxism-Leninism. He renounced anarchism and established the Unidad group, which consisted of expelled members of the CNT. According to García Oliver, Rivas had been convinced by a Soviet agent that the Soviet Army would conquer Spain and would make him the general secretary of the CNT, reformed under Stalinist control. Rivas later published a book denouncing the CNT and anarchism. By 1963, the Spanish anarchist movement considered him a "hopeless traitor".

== Selected works ==
- Luz y tinieblas (Barcelona; 1934)
- España: Encuesta de la libertad (Mexico City; 1953)

== Bibliography ==
- Casanova, Julián (2005). Preston, Paul (ed.). Anarchism, the Republic and Civil War in Spain: 1931–1939. Translated by Dowling, Andrew; Pollok, Graham. Routledge. ISBN 0-415-32095-X.
- Christie, Stuart (2008). We, the Anarchists: A Study of the Iberian Anarchist Federation (FAI). AK Press. ISBN 9781904859758. LCCN 2007939202.
- "Manuel Rivas". Gran Enciclopèdia Catalana (in Catalan).
- Íñiguez, Miguel (2001). "Rivas, Manuel". Esbozo de una enciclopedia histórica del anarquismo español (in Spanish). Madrid: Fundación de Estudios Libertarios Anselmo Lorenzo. p. 516. ISBN 9788486864453. OCLC 807322760.
