= Juan López Sánchez =

Spanish anarcho-syndicalist (1900–1972)

Minister of Commerce
- In office 4 September 1936 – 17 May 1937
- Preceded by: Anastasio de Gracia

Personal details
- Born: 16 January 1900 Bullas, Spain
- Died: 25 August 1972 (aged 72) Madrid, Spain
- Occupation: Construction worker
- Known for: Co-founder of the Federación Sindicalista Libertaria

Juan López Sánchez (16 January 1900 – 1972) was a Spanish construction worker, anarchist and member of the Confederación Nacional del Trabajo (CNT, National Confederation of Labor), and one of the founders of the Federación Sindicalista Libertaria. During the Spanish Civil War (1936–1939) he was Minister of Commerce under Francisco Largo Caballero. After the war he spent several years in exile before returning to Spain where he lived without persecution and participated in the "vertical" trade union movement authorized by the dictatorship of General Francisco Franco.

== Early years (1900–1936) ==
Juan López Sánchez was born in Bullas, Murcia in 1900, where his father was a member of the Civil Guard. A few years later his family moved to Barcelona, where López worked as a laborer. He became involved in politics as a member of the construction union in Barcelona, and was imprisoned in 1920. He was released by an amnesty in 1926 and joined the Solidaridad group. During the dictatorship of Miguel Primo de Rivera he fought in the underground and participated in the congress that produced the split between the CNT and the Federación Anarquista Ibérica (FAI). He stayed with the CNT.

In 1929 López was part of Ángel Pestaña's national committee of the CNT. He edited Acción in 1930–31. He was more interested in syndicalism than anarchism, and generally supported moves to reduce the anarchist aspects of the Confederación Nacional del Trabajo (CNT) in favor of the syndicalist aspects. He was one of the signatories of the Manifiesto de los Treinta (Manifesto of the Thirty) in August 1931. This manifesto criticized the influence of the FAI in the CNT.

After the departure of Pestaña from the CNT in 1932 López supported collaboration with the government. As a signatory of the Manifiesto de los Treinta he was excluded from the anarchist-dominated CNT leadership, and in 1932 was expelled from the CNT. López became a leader of the Opposition Unions (Sindicatos de Oposición). Pestaña and his allies launched the Federación Sindicalista Libertaria (FSL, Anarchist Trade Union Federation), in January 1933. Pestaña was first secretary of the Federation. The FSL at once began involved in the Opposition Unions, providing a political ideology to this group, just as the FAI was doing with the CNT. In January 1934 Pestaña and other moderate anarcho-syndicalists formed a political party, the Partido Sindicalista. López and Joan Peiró became the theoretical leaders of the FSL, and worked to bring it back into the fold of the CNT. At a conference of the Sindicatos de Oposición in February–March 1936 a new national committee was elected that arranged for the unions to rejoin the CNT.

== Civil War (1936–1939) ==
The Spanish Civil War began in July 1936 with the rebellion of Nationalists led by Francisco Franco. López founded the newspaper Fraga Social at the start of the war. With the approach of Nationalist troops to Madrid in early November 1936 the government of Prime Minister Francisco Largo Caballero was restructured to include the anarchists Juan López Sánchez (Commerce), Joan Peiró (Industry), Federica Montseny (Health) and Juan García Oliver (Justice). Peiro was another signatory of the August 1931 Manifiesto de los Treinta, while Montseny and Garcia were members of the FAI. Some of the Spanish anarchists strongly criticized the four anarchist ministers for joining the government.

López was Minister of Commerce from 3 November 1936 until May 1937. He issued a decree in February 1937 that helped define the position of owners of businesses that had been taken over by the state or by workers' collectives. He visited Paris to meet with the French government. The presence of the anarchists in the government might have contributed to the uprising of May 1937, and the weeks of street battles that followed, in which the communists took control of the government and suppressed the revolutionary activity of the Trotskyist Bolshevik-Leninists, the POUM and the anarchist CNT-FAI/FIJL. The anarchist ministers did not have important posts, but provided an excuse to the more moderate left. After the fall of Largo Caballero's government López opposed the government of Juan Negrín and formed a coalition with Segismundo Casado, Cipriano Mera and Julián Besteiro.

In February 1939 López and other anarchist leaders met with Prime Minister Negrín. López represented the CNT, Lorenzo Íñigo Granizo represented the Libertarian Youth and José Grunfeld the FAI. López was a member of the Casado's National Defense Council, formed when Casado revolted against the Republican government in Madrid in March 1939 a few weeks before the victory of the Nationalist forces led by General Francisco Franco. After the National Defense Council was formed, a new Comité Nacional del Movimiento Libertario Español (National Committee of the Spanish Libertarian Movement) was formed on 7 March 1939 with Juan López as secretary-general. Lorenzo Íñigo Granizo was appointed Propaganda Secretary of the Committee. This group met several times during the month, apparently for the last time on 27 March 1943. The committee continued to call for resistance, and demanded that anarchist leaders who had escaped to France when Catalonia fell should return to the central-south area.

== Later career (1939–1972) ==
After the war López was forced to take refuge in France and then England. He published Material de Discusión in London, and maintained a collaborationist position. He called for the CNT to take this position, then abandoned anarcho-syndicalism in favor of "all-powerful" trade unions that would replace political parties and rule in their place. He did not find support for this concept. He remained in England until 1954, when he moved to Mexico.

López returned to Spain in 1966. He attended the Congress of the Sindicato Vertical (Spanish Trade Union Organisation) in Tarragona in May 1968 as an observer, and defended the elimination of the CNT. He accepted a position as head of the Society of Transport Workers of Valencia. He belonged to the Alianza Democrática Española (ADE, Spanish Democratic Alliance), as did Segismundo Casado and the socialist Wenceslao Carrillo, an organization that opposed the moderate Francoism inspired by Salvador de Madariaga. He died in Madrid on 25 August 1972.

== Selected works ==
- Las órdenes religiosas y el sindicalismo (1932)
- La unidad de CNT y su trayectoria (1936)
- Seis meses en el Ministerio de Comercio (1937)
- Concepto de Federalismo en la guerra y en la revolución (1937)
- El sindicato y la colectividad (1938)
- Material de discusión (1945)
- España 1966 (1968)

== Sources ==
- Alexander, Robert J. (1999). The Anarchists in the Spanish Civil War. Janus Publishing Company. ISBN 978-1-85756-412-9.
- Baer, James A. (2015-04-10). Anarchist Immigrants in Spain and Argentina. University of Illinois Press. ISBN 978-0-252-09697-6.
- Cabanellas, Guillermo (1973). La guerra de los mil días: nacimiento, vida y muerte de la II República Española. Vol. 2. Grijalbo S.A.
- Castillo Fernández, Javier; Herrero Pascual, Ana Mª. (2008). "Fondos sobre la Guerra Civil Española en el Archivo General de la Región de Murcia" (PDF). Anales de Documentación. 11. Universidad de Murcia. ISSN 1575-2437.
- Christie, Stuart (2000). We, the Anarchists!: A Study of the Iberian Anarchist Federation (FAI), 1927-1937. ChristieBooks.com. ISBN 978-1-901172-06-5.
- Fremion, Yves (2002). The Orgasms of History: 3000 Years of Spontaneous Insurrection. AK Press. ISBN 978-1-902593-34-0.
- Gabriel, Pere (1985). "Biografía de Juan Peiró. Una cronología". Anthropos Revista De Documentacion Cientifica De La Cultura (in Spanish). Anthropos Editorial. GGKEY:H5WRYDWLENQ.
- Legarreta Mentxaka, Aintzane (2011-04-29). Kate O'Brien and the Fiction of Identity: Sex, Art and Politics in Mary Lavelle and Other Writings. McFarland. ISBN 978-0-7864-5677-2.
- "Lorenzo Íñigo Granizo". CNT Puerto Real (in Spanish). CNT. Archived from the original on 2015-09-27.
- Pasamar Alzuria, Gonzalo; Peiró Martín, Ignacio (2002-05-24). Diccionario Akal de historiadores españoles contemporáneos (in Spanish). AKAL. ISBN 9788446014898.
- Peirats, José (2011). The CNT in the Spanish Revolution. PM Press. ISBN 978-1-60486-207-2.
- Región de Murcia (2015). "Juan López Sánchez". Personajes de Bullas.
- Ruiz, Julius (2014-04-30). The 'Red Terror' and the Spanish Civil War. Cambridge University Press. ISBN 978-1-107-05454-7.
- Simkin, John (September 1997). "Juan López Sánchez". Spartacus Educational Publishers Ltd.
- Thomas, Hugh (2013-11-06). The Spanish Civil War: Revised Edition. Random House Publishing Group. ISBN 978-0-8041-5216-7.
