= Casas Viejas incident =

1933 mass killing in Andalusia, Spain

Coordinates: 36°20′N 5°48′W

The Casas Viejas incident, also known as the Casas Viejas massacre, took place around 11–12 January 1933, in the village of Casas Viejas, in Cádiz Province, Andalusia.

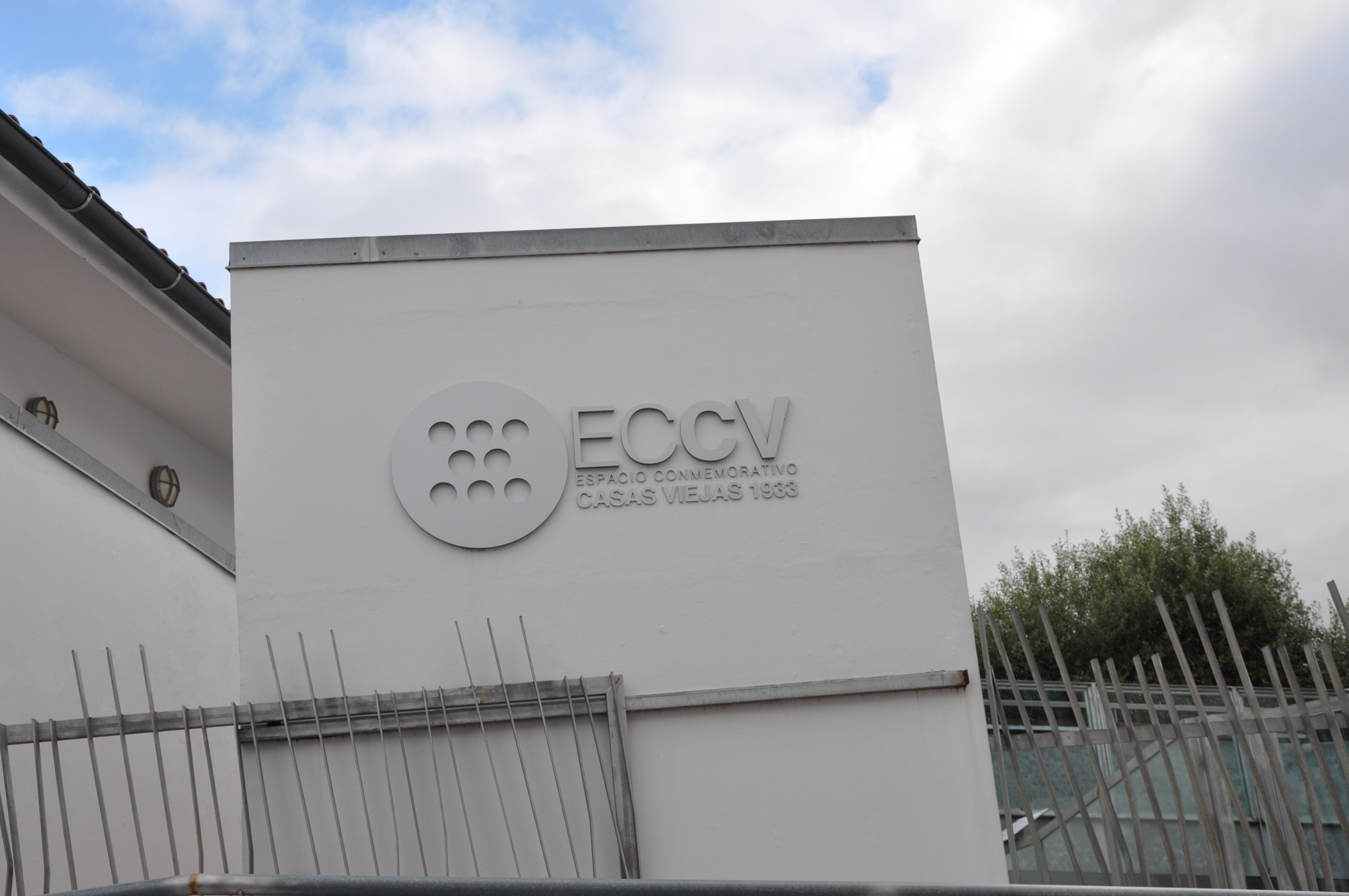
Memorial

== Background ==
The anarchist movement spread across Spain in the late 19th and early 20th centuries and was based on the ideas of Mikhail Bakunin and propagated by Giuseppe Fanelli. It urged workers to unite and organize against the state, the latifundista landowners, and the Church. It quickly took a hold among the agricultural workers in Andalusia, who joined the Confederación Nacional del Trabajo (CNT) or the more radical Federación Anarquista Ibérica (FAI) and had some limited success in improving wages and working conditions. The anarchist movement was opposed by the government of Spain, which had been a republic since April 1931.

== Incident ==
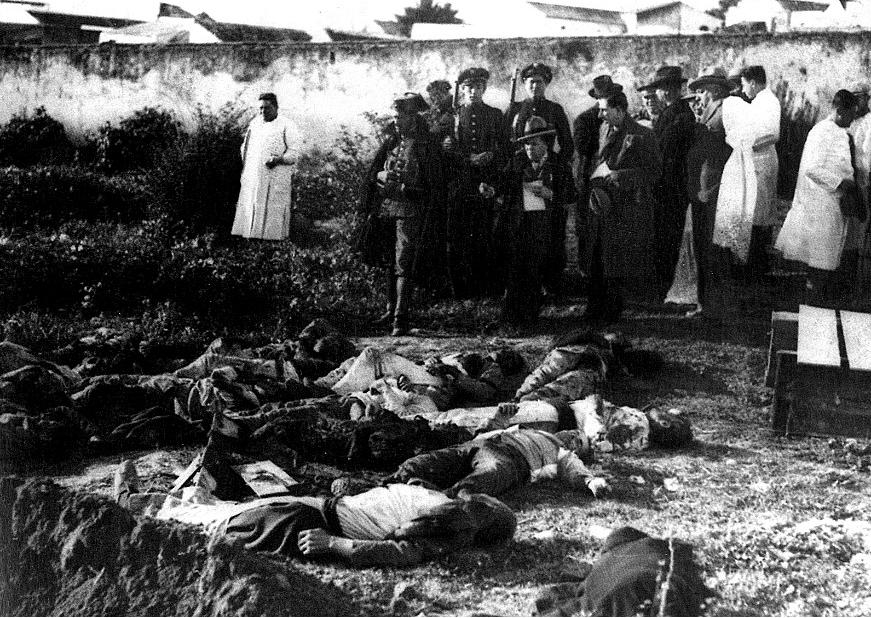
Photograph taken hours after the incident, with the bodies still lying on the ground

In January 1933, workers of the CNT marched in the streets of Casas Viejas, believing they were starting a revolution. During the demonstrations, two guards were wounded. The government's attempt to suppress the revolutionaries came to a head during 11–12 January 1933. The Civil Guard and Assault Guard arrived in Casas Viejas on 11 January. Many of the villagers fled, but some anarchists tried to resist arrest and barricaded themselves in the home of an anarchist, Francisco Cruz Gutiérrez, who was nicknamed Seisdedos (meaning "Six fingers").

When guards under the command of Captain Rojas arrived, they set the house on fire with the anarchists and their families still inside. One anarchist, Maria Silva Cruz, survived the fire and emerged with a child, a boy, still alive. Soldiers and police then arrested anyone in the village who possessed a gun, marched them to the smoking ashes of the cottage and their dead colleagues, and shot them in the back. Twenty-four people died during the incident.

== Legacy ==
The massacre led to national outrage and weakened the republican left government as the anarcho-syndicalists widely boycotted the 1933 elections. Socialists who had once supported the government began to withdraw support for the new republic.

There was considerable debate about whether the orders to kill had been issued by the President of the Second Spanish Republic, Niceto Alcalá-Zamora. That has never been proved, but it is believed to have contributed to his defeat in the following general election.

== See also ==
- Events of Yeste
