= Isaac Puente =

Spanish anarchist (1896–1936)

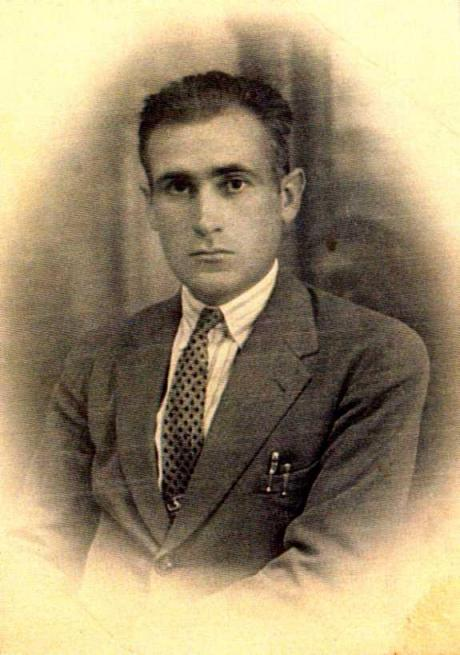
Isaac Puente

Isaac Puente Amestoy (3 June 1896 – 1 September 1936), born in Las Carreras near Biscay, was a Basque physician and Spanish anarchist of a strong anarchist communist bent, who adhered to concerns around birth control, hygiene and sexuality. He promoted anarcho-naturism, and was active in the Confederación Nacional del Trabajo (CNT).

He is best known for his pamphlet El comunismo libertario ("Libertarian Communism") published in 1932. This came to be the adopted programme of the CNT at the May 1936 Congress in Zaragoza, just prior to the Spanish Civil War.

Puente was an important propagandist of anarcho-naturism, was a militant of both the CNT anarcho-syndicalist trade union and Iberian Anarchist Federation. He was among the contributors of the Valencia-based Orto magazine between 1932 and 1934. He published the book El Comunismo Libertario y otras proclamas insurreccionales y naturistas (en:Libertarian Communism and other insurrectionary and naturist proclaims) in 1933, which sold around 100,000 copies. Puente was a doctor who approached his medical practice from a naturist point of view. He saw naturism as an integral solution for the working classes, alongside Neo-Malthusianism, and believed it concerned the living being while anarchism addressed the social being. He believed capitalist societies endangered the well-being of humans from both a socioeconomic and sanitary viewpoint, and promoted anarcho-communism alongside naturism as a solution.

An active militant, he was involved in a failed uprising in Aragon and La Rioja in 1933 for which he suffered repression. Later, Puente was killed by Nationalist forces during the Spanish Civil War after being arrested and taken to Vitoria and later executed in Pancorbo in 1936. The Isaac Puente battalion was named after him.

The location of his remains are unknown.
