= Palau de les Belles Arts =

Building in Barcelona, Spain

Coordinates: 41°23′22.04″N 2°11′01.04″E

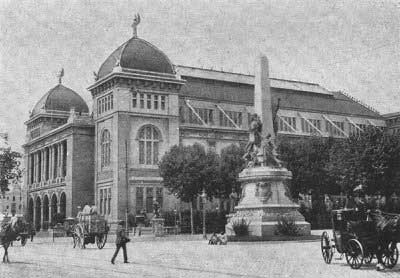

The Palau de les Belles Arts was a multipurpose building in Barcelona. Demolished in 1942, it was built on the occasion of the universal exhibition of 1888, in the space where the municipal courts are currently located in front of the Parc de la Ciutadella, on the corner of Passeig de Lluís Companys and Passeig de Pujades.

== Architecture ==
Work of August Font i Carreras, it was destined to artistic exhibitions, concerts and cultural events. The building had a rectangular floor plan and was 91 x 50 meters. The iron structure allowed to cover a great assembly hall. It had exposed hand towers, with domes at the corners. On the second floor, there were different rooms, around the large one, with zenithal light, which allowed events and exhibitions to take place.

The building basically consisted of a large hall, the Queen Regent's Hall, with an area of 2,000 square meters (22,000 sq ft), intended for public events.

It was decorated with sculptures and paintings by the best artists of the time ( Eduard Batiste Alentorn, Mariano Benlliure, Modest Urgell, etc. ). The Hercules fountain, built in 1797, remained in its gardens until it was moved in 1928.

After the exhibition, it remained open until 1938 (during the bombing of the Italian Legionary Air Force in March 1938 a bomb fell on it in the middle of the Central Hall). It was demolished during the summer of 1942, arguing its poor condition, and used to sell the iron of the structure. Possibly it had to do with the fact that the palace was seen as a building that, due to the events that had taken place, had a great Catalanist significance.

== Public events ==
The Palace became a location for public events, conferences, etc. The official inauguration of the Universal Exposition was held there on May 20, 1888, through the intervention of the reigning queen Maria Christina of Austria and king Alfonso XIII. For years it was the venue of the Floral Games.

Other important events that took place there were the official inauguration of the Caja de Pensiones para la Vellesa y d'Estalvis de Catalunya i Balears, on 16 April 1904, by Alfonso XIII, who was appointed honorary president and in 1910, the Congress of Workers' Solidarity, attended by union delegates from all over the country.

In May 1919, the first Barcelona Motor Show was held and in 1920 the first official trade fair in the city.

== Use as a room of concerts ==
The room had a large organ by Aquilino Amezua (1847-1912): it had five manual keyboards and a pedal and worked with electricity; at the time, it was one of the best organs of its kind in Europe. He was the official organist of Primitiu Pardàs and gave musical recitals such as Gigout, Widor, Guilmant and Saint-Saëns .

The Barcelona Symphony Orchestra and the Barcelona Municipal Band gave regular concerts there. The Sunday morning concerts were very popular, which were broadcast on the radio, and were given, under the direction of Joan Lamote de Grignon, between 1930 and 1936. Free for those who did not sit (the entrance with the right to a seat cost one peseta), they were the most important means of disseminating the symphonic repertoire (although arranged for the band) of the time, together with the concerts of the ' Associació Obrera de Concerts .

== Use as a room of exhibitions ==
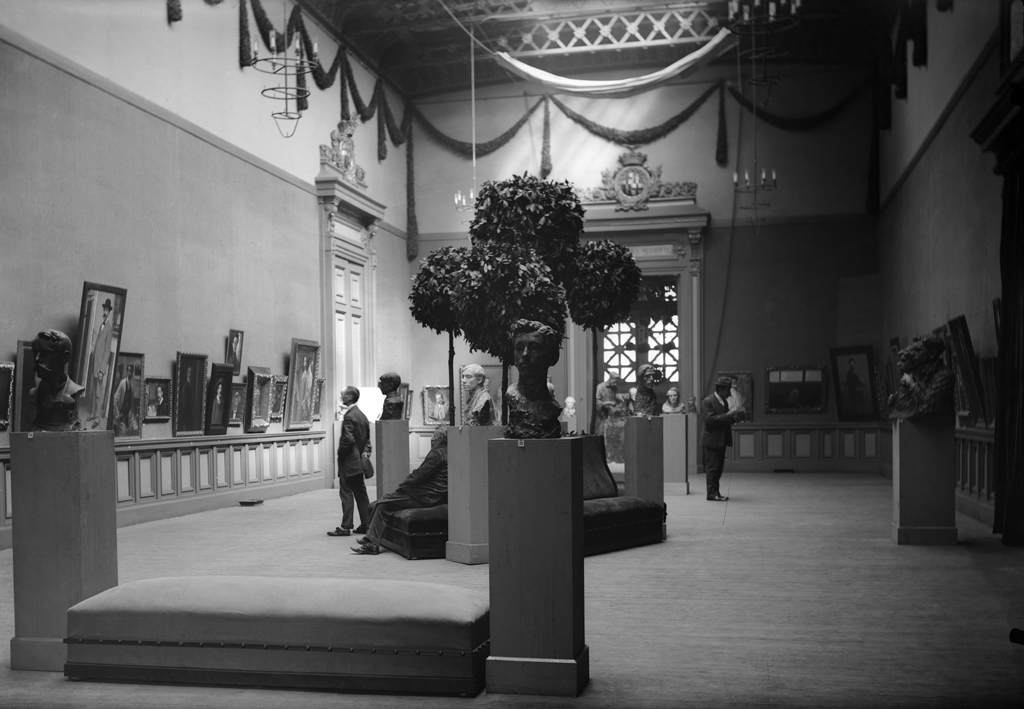
Baldomer Gili Red.Exhibition “Autoretratos of Artistas Españoles” to the Palace of Beautiful Arts of Barcelona, 1907

This building was the first headquarters of the Municipal Museum of Fine Arts of Barcelona, between 1891 and 1915, where the different municipal and later provincial art collections met, a collection that years later became part of the Museum. National Art of Catalonia . During the Universal Exhibition, an exhibition of works of art from municipal collections and other collections from all over Spain was exhibited. Afterwards, exhibitions of fine arts and artistic industries took place ( General Exhibition of Fine Arts of Barcelona ). The periodic holding of these shows necessitated the temporary relocation of funds to other places. In 1917 the Exposition d'Art Français was organized in solidarity with French artists.

In 1921 the works belonging to the Municipal Museums of Arts of Barcelona were incorporated.

== Bibliography ==
- FUENTES MILÀ, Sergio; El Palau de Belles Arts de Barcelona: gènesi, vida i mort (1887-1942); Tesi de Màster en Estudis Avançats en Història de l'Art, dirigida pel Dr.Joan Molet i Petit; Universitat de Barcelona, Departament Història de l'Art: 2010
- FUENTES MILÀ, Sergio; El Palacio de Bellas Artes de Barcelona: el Eclecticismo suntuoso como sede de colecciones (comunicació de Seminari). Al Seminari de la Real Academia de Bellas Artes de San Fernando, Madrid "Desamortizaciones, colecciones, exposiciones y comercio de arte en los siglos XIX y XX" (10 i 11 de juny de 2011)
- CIERVO, Joaquín; Historial del Palacio de Bellas Artes; Impr.Viuda de R.Tobella, Barcelona: 1943
