= Union dues =

Regular payment of money

Union dues are regular payments made by workers which grant membership of a trade union. Dues fund the provision of union services such as representation in collective bargaining and education activities. Nearly all unions require their members to pay dues. Dues can be collected directly or indirectly from workers; in the case of indirect collection this is often through a check-off where a worker authorises an employer to transfer the membership dues, from their wages, to their trade union.

== Variation ==
Many union members pay union dues out of their wages, although some unions collect dues separately from the paycheck. Union dues may be used to support a wide variety of programs or activities, including negotiating contracts; paying the salaries and benefits of union leaders and staff; union governance; legal representation; legislative lobbying (Members Dues money paid are never used for political campaigns, that is illegal. Many contribute their own money voluntarily to a labor related PAC Fund); pension, health, welfare and safety funds and the union strike fund. The expenditure of dues is then authorized either by the local union meeting or by the elected leaders of a union.

Dues are different from fees and assessments. Fees are generally one-time-only payments made by the union member to the union to cover the administration of ongoing programs or activities. One example is the initiation fee, a fee charged by the union to the worker when the employee first joins the union. The initiation fee covers the administrative costs of joining the union. Fees may, however, be ongoing. For example, a union program (such as a welfare or benefit fund) may be offered only to those union members who pay a regular fee to participate in the fund. Most union workers pay a fee when they start working for a company.

Since participation in the fund is not a requirement of union membership, the payment qualifies as a fee payment and not a dues payment. Assessments are generally one-time-only payments made by the union member to the union to cover a special program or activity. These special programs may or may not be ongoing, and may or may not operate for a limited time or in a limited fashion. An example is an organizing assessment, a payment the union may levy on its members to establish a union organizing fund. Another example is a one-time-only assessment to establish a fund since the fund requires a large capital infusion to be established, the assessment is used to raise this money.

Many local unions are affiliated with municipal, provincial, state, regional or national bodies. Often, these bodies levy their own dues on local unions, and a union member's dues may include the dues these other union organizations impose.

The legal status of union dues may be regulated by law. Depending on each country's labor law or the kind of union security agreement permitted by law, not all dues may be collected from all members.

The level of union dues varies widely. Some unions collect a percentage of each worker's pay (which may be limited to base wages only or include additional pay such as overtime income). Others collect a percentage of each worker's pay, but the percentage itself varies on a sliding scale (with lower-paid workers paying a lower percentage). Some dues ("set-dues") may be set at a specific level. For example, "each worker must be 150 dollars per month." Some unions use a combination of percentage and "set-dues". Collection frequency also varies widely, and may be tied to the receipt of the paycheck or on a calendar basis (biweekly, monthly, or yearly).

Collection methods also exhibit wide variation. In industrialized countries the "dues checkoff" mechanism is commonplace, where the employer agrees to deduct all union dues, fees, and assessments automatically from each worker's pay-check and transmit the funds to the union on a regular basis. Many unions, however, collect dues from workers directly. For example, the Industrial Workers of the World prohibit employers to collect dues on its behalf through their constitution.
