= Iberian Anarchist Federation =

Spanish anarchist federation

Iberian Anarchist Federation Federación Anarquista Ibérica
- Founded: 1927; 99 years ago
- Newspaper: Tierra y Libertad
- Ideology: Anarcho-syndicalism; Anarcho-communism; Iberism
- Political position: Far-left
- International affiliation: International of Anarchist Federations
- Colors: Black

Party flag

Website
- Blog

The Iberian Anarchist Federation (Spanish: Federación Anarquista Ibérica, FAI) is a Spanish anarchist organization. Due to its close relation with the Confederación Nacional del Trabajo (CNT) anarcho-syndicalist union, it is often abbreviated as CNT-FAI. The FAI publishes the periodical Tierra y Libertad.

The Iberian part of its name alludes to the purpose of unifying Spanish and Portuguese anarchists in a Pan-Iberian organization. The FAI meetings were initially attended by members of the Portuguese anarchist organizations União Anarquista Portuguesa and Confederação Geral do Trabalho, including the Zaragoza Congress of the CNT in 1936. However, it later ceased to have Portuguese participation and become an entirely Spanish organization. It is still in operation today and aligns itself with the International of Anarchist Federations (IAF-IFA).

== History ==
The FAI was founded in Valencia in 1927 (after a preliminary meeting the previous year in Marseille, France), to campaign for keeping the CNT on an anarchist path. It challenged the bureaucracy of the CNT, which it viewed as having grown to become a mediating link between labor and capital, rather than a representative of the working class. This issue had become especially tense, as Miguel Primo de Rivera's dictatorial regime took over in Spain, and engineered a crackdown on labour movements.

The disproportional hegemony which the FAI gained over CNT politics in the early 1930s led to confrontation with the less radical revolutionary syndicalist members. From 1931, in the first years of the Second Spanish Republic, possibilist union officials (Treintism, the pro-Republican 'Treinta' and their followers) were systematically forced out of office or expelled, leading to the creation of anti-FAI Opposition Unions within the CNT in March 1933. The most moderate trade-unionists, under Ángel Pestaña, were ultimately expelled, forming the Syndicalist Party in April 1934, and leaving the CNT leadership under firm FAI control by the time of the Spanish Civil War.

Members of the FAI were at the forefront of the fight against Francisco Franco's forces during the Spanish Civil War, mainly in the Eastern Army (Ejército del Este).

Since Franco's death, and Spain's transition to representative democracy, the FAI has continued to function. Though the organization shares members with the CNT, the FAI's membership is secret.

== See also ==
- Anarchism in Spain
- Anarchist Federation (France)
- Argentine Libertarian Federation
- Italian Anarchist Federation
- Viva la FAI
- Opposition to Francoism

== Sources ==
- Jason Garner, Goals and Means: Anarchism, Syndicalism and Internationalism in the Origins of the Federación Anarquista Ibérica, AK Press, 2016, 362pp, ISBN 978-1-84935-225-3
- Stuart Christie, We, the anarchists! A study of the Iberian Anarchist Federation (FAI) 1927–1937, ChristieBooks (distributed by Central Books), 128pp, ISBN 1-901172-06-6
- Martínez, Beltrán Roca (2006). "Anarchism, anthropology and Andalucia: an analysis of the CNT and 'New Capitalism'" (PDF). Anarchist Studies. 14 (2). London: Lawrence & Wishart: 106–130. ISSN 0967-3393. Archived from the original (PDF) on 24 September 2020.

=== Film ===
- Living Utopia (Vivir la Utopia) by Juan Gamero, Arte-TVE, Catalunya 1997. Short description and link to view the film:Vivir la utopía – Anarchopedia
