= Pablo Yagüe =

Pablo Yagüe Estebaranz
- Born: c. 1909; Condado de Castilnovo, Spain
- Died: 19 May 1943; Madrid, Spain
- Occupation: Trade union leader
- Known for: Delegate of the Madrid Defense Council

Pablo Yagüe Estebaranz (c. 1909 – 19 May 1943) was a Spanish trade union leader and communist politician. During the Spanish Civil War (1936–39) he was briefly in charge of Supplies for the Madrid Defense Council, before being shot and badly wounded at an Anarchist roadblock. After the war he lived in hiding in Spain for some time, then was arrested, tried and executed.

== Early years ==
Pablo Yagüe Estebaranz was born in Condado de Castilnovo in 1909 or 1910. He moved to Madrid in search of work and found employment delivering bread. In 1925 he joined the Bakery union affiliated with the Unión General de Trabajadores (UGT, General Union of Workers), in which he reached managerial positions between 1933 and 1935. In 1930 he joined the Communist Party of Spain (Partido Comunista de España, PCE) along with other union leaders such as Isidoro Diéguez and Luis Cabo Giorla. He was arrested several times: in 1931 (accused of trying to poison the water supply of Madrid) and in 1933 and 1935 (for belonging to the Madrid Provincial Committee of the PCE). In early 1936 he was the secretary of this committee.

== Civil war ==
In November 1936, the government evacuated to Valencia. The Political Bureau of the PCE remained in Madrid, unlike the leaders of the other parties. Pedro Checa and Antonio Mije negotiated with General José Miaja for participation of the Communists in Madrid Defense Council (Junta de Defensa de Madrid). The communists were given three ministries, War, Supplies and Public Order, which were to be led by Antonio Mije, Pablo Yagüe and Santiago Carrillo, respectively. Yagüe represented the UGT and Carrillo the Unified Socialist Youth. His first action was to impose controls that limited shoppers to buying food at one store. If supplies there were exhausted they could try other stores in the same district. As the siege took effect, he had to deal with upward pressure on prices.

The Defense Council was restructured and renamed the Junta Delegada de Defensa de Madrid, or the Delegate Defense Council of Madrid, to comply with an order of 25 November 1936 by President Francisco Largo Caballero. This was to affirm that the council was subordinate to the government. On 2 December 1936 the Defense Council reconvened with Miaja as chairman. Isidoro Diéguez was now Militias delegate, Yagüe retained Supplies and Carrillo retained Public Order.

On 23 December 1936 Yagüe was stopped at three in the afternoon at a roadblock while traveling out of Madrid on official business. The block was run by anarchists guarding the Libertarian Atheneum. They were preventing passage of those who did not carry a pass validated by the Confederación Nacional del Trabajo (CNT). According to the anarchists, Yagüe refused to stay at the roadblock after the guards decided he did not have proper documentation. When the car drove on, the guards fired at it and Yagüe was seriously injured by a bullet in the back. The Communists said it was a premeditated attack, caused by the hostility of the anarchists, who had interfered in the distribution of food in collectivized establishments. The incident led to fighting and retaliatory actions in Madrid between communists and anarcho-syndicalists that took the life of several militants on both sides. Those involved, who were arrested after the incident by forces of Santiago Carrillo's Delegation of Public Order, were eventually acquitted by a people's court.

Due to the severity of his wounds, Yagüe was relieved as a member of the Council and replaced by Luis Nieto de la Fuente, his deputy. The Madrid Defense Council was dissolved on 23 April 1937. In May 1937 Yagüe was discharged and went on to serve in the Bakers union. In March 1939 Segismundo Casado launched an anti-communist uprising in Madrid supported by the militant anarchist Cipriano Mera. After Casado succeeded, Yagüe was arrested and interned in Porlier prison.

== Last years ==
Yagüe was in Porlier prison when Madrid fell into the hands of General Francisco Franco's troops, resulting in the end of the civil war. However, he was released on 23 September 1941 without being brought to trial. He hid in the house of Alicia Martinez, whom he had known during the civil war and with whom he had a relationship, without getting involved in rebuilding the clandestine structure of the party. However, he was arrested again, along with his girlfriend and her parents. He was admitted again to the Porlier prison. He and fourteen other people were tried in April 1943. They were accused of having tried to reorganize Communist Party groups and cells, of sabotage and attacks, and of various war crimes. Yagüe, with eleven of the accused, was sentenced to death and shot by firing squad on 19 May 1943 against the walls of the Cementerio de la Almudena.

== Sources ==
- Aguilera Povedano, Manuel Alejandro (2008). "El suceso Yagüe: el problema de los controles obreros en la defensa de Madrid" (PDF). Ayeres en discusión: Temas clave de Historia Contemporánea hoy. ISBN 978-84-8371-772-1.
- Aróstegui, Julio; Martínez, Jesús A. (1984). La Junta de Defensa de Madrid. Madrid: Comunidad de Madrid. ISBN 84-505-0088-5.
- "Providencias Judiciales: Juzgado Número 9". Boletín Oficial de la Provincia de Madrid. 22 August 1932. Archived from the original on 6 March 2014.
- Bolloten, Burnett (1991). The Spanish Civil War: Revolution and Counterrevolution. Univ of North Carolina Press. ISBN 978-0-8078-1906-7.
- Montoliú Camps, Pedro (2005). Madrid en la posguerra, 1939-1946: los años de la represión. Silex Ediciones. ISBN 978-84-7737-159-5.
- Castillo, Santiago (2008). Historia de la UGT (in Spanish). Siglo XXI de España Editores. ISBN 978-84-323-1385-1.
- Fernández Rodríguez, Carlos (2007). "El grupo de "información, seguridad y recuperación": trece antifranquistas fusilados injustamente por la barbarie franquista". Comunicaciones del II Congreso de historia del PCE: De la resistencia antifranquista a la creación de IU. Un enfoque social. Fundación de Investigaciones Marxistas. ISBN 978-84-87098-44-4. Archived from the original on 4 March 2014.
- Peirats, José (2011). The CNT in the Spanish Revolution. PM Press. ISBN 978-1-60486-207-2.
- Preston, Paul (8 April 2011). El holocausto español: Odio y exterminio en la Guerra Civil y después. Penguin Random House Grupo Editorial España. ISBN 978-84-9992-049-8.
- Preston, Paul (2013). El zorro rojo: La vida de Santiago Carrillo. Debate. ISBN 978-84-9032-422-6.
- R.D. (13 August 2007). "DIEGUEZ DUEÑAS, Isidoro". Los de la sierra (in French).
