= Vicente Uribe =

Spanish politician (1902–1961)

Vicente Uribe Galdeano

Minister of Agriculture
- In office 4 September 1936 – 31 March 1939
- Preceded by: Mariano Ruiz-Funes
- Succeeded by: Raimundo Fernández-Cuesta

Personal details
- Born: Vicente Uribe Galdeano; 30 December 1902 Bilbao, Spain
- Died: 11 July 1961 (aged 58) Prague, Czechoslovakia
- Party: Communist Party of Spain
- Occupation: Metalworker, politician

Vicente Uribe Galdeano (30 December 1902 – 11 July 1961) was a Spanish metalworker and politician who became a member of the executive of the Communist Party of Spain (PCE). He served as Minister of Agriculture during the Spanish Civil War (1936–1939) for the Republican faction. He went into exile in Mexico during World War II (1939–1945), then lived in France and Czechoslovakia after the war. He was disgraced in 1956 during the post-Stalinist power struggle.

== Life ==
=== Early years ===
Vicente Uribe Galdeano was born in Bilbao in 1897. He became a metalworker, and in 1923 joined the Communist Party of Spain. He was a member of the party's executive from 1927. He married Teresa García, and they had five children. In 1932 the Spanish Communist Party made a major change in direction when it abandoned the Comintern slogan "Workers' and Peasants' Government" and adopted "Defense of the Republic". Uribe was among the new leaders of the party who succeeded José Bullejos. The others were José Díaz, Antonio Mije, Juan Astigarrabía and Jesús Hernández Tomás. Uribe represented the PCE in creating the draft electoral manifesto of the Popular Front for the elections on 16 February 1936.

=== Civil War ===
After the start of the Spanish Civil War Uribe was appointed Minister of Agriculture in the cabinet of Francisco Largo Caballero on 5 September 1936. For tactical reasons the communists supported small businessmen and peasants. In September 1936 Uribe said,

The present policy of violence against the peasants has two dangers. The first is that it may estrange those who are on our side, on the antifascist side. The other is still more serious: it will endanger the future food supply of Spain. ... It cannot be tolerated that while at the front the soldiers are giving their lives and their blood for the common cause, there are persons far behind the lines who use rifles belonging to the people in order to impose by force ideas that the people do not accept. But I tell you, peasants; I tell you, workers of the countryside, that despite the abuses some persons are committing, despite the barbarities they are perpetrating, your obligation is to work the land and extract the utmost from it, because you are protected by the government, by parties and by organizations, and because you have at your side the Communist party. ... Even though violence is being used, it is your duty as patriots, your duty as republicans, your duty as antifascists to call upon the government, to call upon the Communists, and you can be sure that, in order that you may cultivate the land peacefully, we shall be at your side armed with rifles.

On 7 October 1936 Uribe issued a decree seizing for the state all rural properties of anyone who had been involved in the military insurrection, with no compensation. The estates were given to organizations of peasants and agricultural workers, who could decide whether to cultivate them collectively or individually. Small cultivators with leased estates below a certain size were given perpetual use of their land. Mundo Obrero commented, "This decree breaks the foundation of the semifeudal power of the big landlords who, in order to maintain their brutal caste privileges and to perpetuate salaries of two pesetas a day and labor from dawn to dusk, have unleashed the bloody war that is devastating Spain." Uribe's decree, represented as revolutionary, was in fact simply recognizing changes that had already occurred. The anarchist CNT and socialist FNTT (Note: FNTT: Federación Nacional de Trabajadores de la Tierra, the agrarian workers' union of the socialist Unión General de Trabajadores (UGT).) were both intensely hostile to the decree, with its protection of the rights of small owners. Throughout the war Uribe refused to give the agricultural collectives a permanent legal status. In the spring of 1937 the PCE started to support return of collectivized land to landowners who had not supported Franco's rebellion, and to tenant farmers and sharecroppers, who often held right-wing views.

A decree of 9 November 1936 established a Higher War Council consisting of the socialists Largo Caballero (War) and Indalecio Prieto (Air and Navy), the communist Uribe (Agriculture) and communist sympathiser Julio Álvarez del Vayo (Foreign Affairs), the Left Republican Julio Just Gimeno (Public Works) and the CNT-FAI Juan García Oliver (Justice). Largo Caballero, a socialist, found himself increasingly isolated, and by February 1937 was demanding that his ministers confirm their support for him, particularly the communist ministers Uribe and Jesús Hernández Tomás. On 8 March 1937 the Italians began an advance on the Guadalajara sector, which at first overcame all resistance. Uribe and Hernández Tomás demanded the resignation of the chief of the central general staff, General Toribio Martínez Cabrera. The advanced was checked, but Martínez Cabrera was replaced. In April 1937 Franco launched a major thrust in the north of Spain with German and Italian assistance. The Higher War Council designated Uribe to investigate the situation. He was accompanied by the Soviet General Vladimir Gorev.

On 15 May 1937 Uribe and Hernández caused the collapse of Largo Caballero's government. The trigger was a disagreement in a cabinet meeting over the May Days violence in Barcelona, which the communists blamed on the Anarchist CNT and FAI and the dissident communist POUM. They demanded that the POUM be banned and its leaders arrested as "fascists". Largo Caballero refused to act, and most of the ministers walked out of the meeting. On 17 May 1937 Manuel Azaña dismissed Largo and named Juan Negrín Prime Minister of Spain. Negrín's government included the socialists Indalecio Prieto (War, Navy and Air) and Julián Zugazagoitia (Interior), the communists Hernández Tomás (Education) and Uribe (Agriculture), the Republicans José Giral (Foreign Affairs) and Bernardo Giner de los Ríos (Public Works), the Basque Manuel de Irujo (Justice) and the Catalan Nationalist Jaume Aiguader (Labor). The Higher War Council was reorganized and consisted of Negrín, Giral, Uribe and Prieto.

In the second Negrín cabinet, formed on 5 April 1938, Uribe was the only communist representative. According to Togliatti, the tactic of withdrawing from the government was to "convince English and French public opinion that the Communists are not interested in the conquest of power, not even in Spain, where we could do so with comparative ease. ... In this way, we shall strengthen Anglo-French ties with the Soviets. If Hitler should decide on war he will have to wage it against the USSR and the Western democracies. Uribe remained Minister of Agriculture until 1 February 1939.

=== Later career ===
Uribe left Spain after the defeat of the Republic, and by late 1939 had reached Mexico. The party decided to form a secretariat in Mexico that included Uribe, Antonio Mije, Pedro Checa, Santiago Carrillo, Joan Comorera, Fernando Claudín and others. Uribe led the PCE group in Mexico during World War II (1939–1945). He became second in the overall PCE leadership after Jesús Hernández Tomás was expelled from the party in 1944.

Uribe moved from Mexico to Paris with Antonio Mije in May 1946. Dolores Ibárruri withdrew due to sickness in the summer of 1947, and Uribe and Mije began feuding with Francisco Antón and Carrillo. Moscow gave Uribe and Claudín the role of judges in the purge of PCE leadership that began in November 1947. On 7 September 1950 the Spanish communists were outlawed in France. Uribe moved to Prague, Czechoslovakia with Mije and Enrique Líster, while Carrillo and Antón remained underground in Paris.

Joseph Stalin died in March 1953 and in July 1953 Antón was thrown out of the Political Bureau, leaving Uribe, Ibárruri and Carrillo as the PCE leaders. These three led the 5th PCE Congress in Czechoslovakia in September 1954. Carrillo began maneuvering for greater power.

After Nikita Khrushchev denounced Stalin, Ibárruri abandoned Uribe and began to support Carrillo. In February 1956 Uribe was denounced at the post-Stalinist 20th Congress of the Communist Party of the Soviet Union in Moscow. Both Ibárruri and Uribe were accused of the "cult of personality" by Fernando Claudín and Carrillo, but Uribe was the main target. He was eliminated from the PCE executive in the central committee plenary session of July–August 1956.

Vicente Uribe died in Prague on 11 July 1961.

== Publications ==
- Vicente Uribe (1937), Nadie está autorizado para saquear campos y pueblos Ministerio de Agricultura (in Spanish), Introduction by Enrique Castro Delgado., Valencia: Pascual Quiles, p. 60
- Vicente Uribe (1936), A los campesinos de España, conferencia pronunciada en Algemesí el 29 de noviembre de 1936 (in Spanish), Valencia: Ediciones del Partido Comunista de España, p. 16
- Vicente Uribe (1937), Nuestros hermanos, los campesinos. Conferencia pronunciada en el Teatro Apolo, de Valencia, el día 21 de enero de 1937, por Vicente Uribe, Ministro de Agricultura, Partido Comunista de España, [S.l.] (in Spanish), p. 14
- Vicente Uribe (1937), Los campesinos y la República, conferencia pronunciada el día 22 de enero en el Teatro Apolo de Valencia, Partido Comunista (in Spanish), Valencia: Gráficas Turia, p. 23
- Vicente Uribe (1937), Nuestra labor en el campo: discurso pronunciado en el Pleno del C. C. ampliado del Partido Comunista de España, celebrado en Valencia los días 5, 6, 7 y 8 de marzo de 1937 (in Spanish), Ediciones del Partido Comunista de España, Comisión Nacional de Agit Prop, [s.l.], p. 30
- Vicente Uribe (1937), La revolución en el campo: legislación agrícola (in Spanish), Valencia: Comisión Provincial de Agit. Prop. del Partido Comunista, p. 31
- Vicente Uribe (1937), La política agraria del Partido Comunista, conferencia pronunciada el domingo 4 de julio de 1937 en el cine Olympia de Valencia, por Vicente Uribe, Ministro de Agricultura, Partido Comunista de España (in Spanish), Barcelona, p. 30
- Vicente Uribe (1937), Gobernar de cara al pueblo: discursos pronunciados desde el micrófono de Unión Radio y en el Teatro Calderón de Madrid (in Spanish), Partido Comunista, Radio Norte, p. 28
- Vicente Uribe (1937), Qué hacer en la nueva situación para ganar la guerra. Informe de Vicente Uribe en la Asamblea Nacional del Partido Comunista, resumen de Jesús Hernández (in Spanish), Madrid, Barcelona: Partido Comunista de España, p. 32
- Vicente Uribe (1938), El problema de las nacionalidades en España a luz de la guerra popular por la independencia de la República Española (in Spanish), Valencia: Ediciones del Partido Comunista de España, p. 23
- Vicente Uribe (1938), Producir más y entregar al gobierno el excedente es condición de la victoria. Conferencia pronunciada en el Teatro Circo de Albacete el día 30 de octubre de 1938 (in Spanish), Valencia: Instituto de Reforma Agraria, p. 16
- Vicente Uribe, Discurso... en el cine Monumental (in Spanish), Valencia: Prensa Obrera, p. 28
- Vicente Uribe (1940), Los intereses del pueblo español están en la paz (conferencia pronunciada en México el día 11 de mayo de 1940) (in Spanish), México: Editorial Popular, p. 33
- Vicente Uribe, España, república de trabajadores, Campaña pro-reivindicación de la república, Acción Republicana Democrática Española (in Spanish), México, p. 11
- Vicente Uribe (1945), Qué es y qué representa la unión nacional de los Españoles (in Spanish), México
- Vicente Uribe (1949), Yankee imperialism in Spain (in Spanish), (Series of four articles published in Mundo Obrero in August 1948, New York: New Century Publishers, p. 32
- Vicente Uribe (1954), Informe sobre: "Programa del Partido", V Congreso del Partido Comunista de España (in Spanish), Prague, p. 42

== Sources ==
- Alexander, Robert J. (1999). The Anarchists in the Spanish Civil War. Janus Publishing Company Lim. ISBN 978-1-85756-400-6.
- Beevor, Antony (2006). The battle for Spain. The Spanish civil war. London: Penguin Books. ISBN 9780143037651.
- Bolloten, Burnett (1991). The Spanish Civil War: Revolution and Counterrevolution. Univ of North Carolina Press. ISBN 978-0-8078-1906-7.
- Bookchin, Murray (2005-06-08). The Third Revolution. A&C Black. ISBN 978-0-8264-7801-6.
- Foweraker, Joe (2003-10-02). Making Democracy in Spain: Grass-Roots Struggle in the South, 1955-1975. Cambridge University Press. ISBN 978-0-521-52281-6.
- Graham, Helen (1991-06-28). Socialism and War: The Spanish Socialist Party in Power and Crisis, 1936-1939. Cambridge University Press. ISBN 978-0-521-39257-0.
- Peirats, José (2011-08-01). The CNT in the Spanish Revolution. Vol. 1. PM Press. ISBN 978-1-60486-597-4.
- Peirats, José; Ealham, Chris (2005). The CNT in the Spanish Revolution. ChristieBooks.com. ISBN 978-1-873976-24-1.
- Stutje, Jan Willem (2012-08-15). Charismatic Leadership and Social Movements: The Revolutionary Power of Ordinary Men and Women. Berghahn Books. ISBN 978-0-85745-329-7.
- Thomas, Hugh (2003). The Spanish Civil War. London: Penguin Books.
- "Vicente Uribe Galdeano". Proyecto filosofía. 29 May 2015.
