= Pedro Checa =

Spanish politician (1910–1942)

Pedro Fernández Checa
- Pedro Checa c. 1936. Dolores Ibárruri to the left.
- Born: 1910; Valencia, Spain
- Died: 6 August 1942 (aged 31–32); Mexico
- Occupation: Technical draftsman
- Known for: Secretary of the Spanish Communist Party (1935–42)

Pedro Fernández Checa, usually known as Pedro Checa (1910 – 6 August 1942) was a Spanish Communist who played a leading role in the party during the Spanish Civil War (1936–39). After the defeat of the Republic he was forced into exile in the Soviet Union and then Mexico, where he died.

== Life ==
=== Early years ===
Pedro Fernández Checa was born in Valencia in 1910. He studied as an industrial technician and worked as a draftsman. He moved to Seville, where he had contact with José Díaz Ramos, who would become general secretary of the Spanish Communist Party (PCE: Partido Comunista Español). In Madrid he joined a small leftist group which published a newspaper called Rebelión. The group included Manuel Navarro Ballesteros, who later would direct Mundo Obrero. Checa acquired some theoretical background with this group, and with them joined the Spanish Communist Party soon after the proclamation of the Second Spanish Republic. His decision was due to the influence of José Díaz Ramos. Checa had great capacity for work, and was also very shy. While he was a militant in the PCE he always had a reputation as an honest and hard working person. He was among the most respected of the militants.

Despite his youth, Checa joined the Central Committee of the party in 1932 after José Bullejos was sacked by the Comintern, and joined the general secretariat of José Díaz. In 1935, according to the Comintern, he was appointed secretary of organization. The historian Gregorio Morán says that when the Comintern ordered the appointment of Checa as secretary of the PCE, he was not even a substitute member of Central Committee.

=== Civil War ===
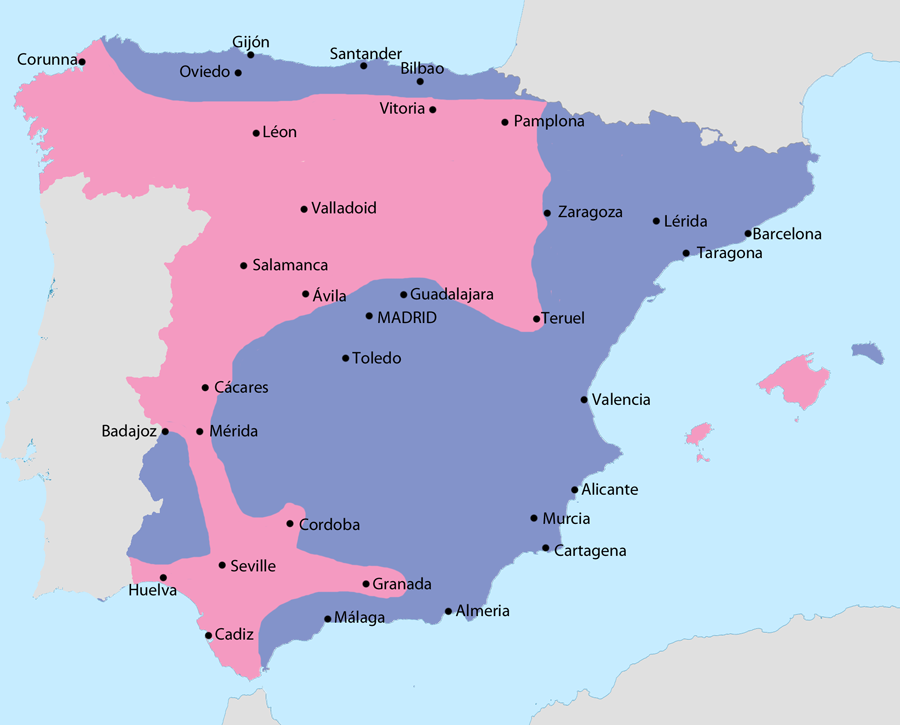
Spain in September 1936: Area under Nationalist control Area under Republican control

During the Spanish Civil War (17 July 1936 – 1 April 1939) Checa and "Pasionaria" (Dolores Ibárruri) led the PCE due to illness of the Secretary General, José Díaz. In November 1936, the government evacuated to Valencia. The Political Bureau of the PCE remained in Madrid, unlike the leaders of the other parties. Checa and Antonio Mije negotiated with General José Miaja for participation of the Communists in Madrid Defense Council (Junta de Defensa de Madrid). This consisted of three ministries, War, Supplies and Public Order, which were led by Antonio Mije, Pablo Yagüe and Santiago Carrillo, respectively. Yagüe represented the Unión General de Trabajadores (UGT, General Union of Workers) and Carrillo the Unified Socialist Youth.

By this time Checa was working for the Soviet secret service, the NKVD. As secretary of the organization, he was also responsible for the secret or illegal party apparatus, consisting of "special teams" that, for example, had already taken part in murdering Falangists. For this reason several authors have blamed him for having ordered the Paracuellos massacres. Angel Viñas states that the mass killings were ordered or suggested by the NKVD. "His responsibility for both the initial spark and for monitoring and surveillance of the operation is undeniable." Julius Ruiz does not directly implicate Checa and argues that the killings were mainly managed and promoted by the Spanish, with the Soviets simply giving support. During the war Checa proposed organizing guerrilla groups from the refugees from the areas occupied by the rebels, although until September 1937 he was not allowed to organize these forces as the XIV Corps of the Guerrilla Army. As a Communist leader, Checa was one of the PCE negotiators in talks that ultimately failed over merging the PCE and the PSOE (Partido Socialista Obrero Español, Spanish Socialist Workers' Party).

When the Republican forces were defeated in the Battle of the Ebro (July–November 1938) and General Francisco Franco's troops reached the Mediterranean, Checa stayed in Madrid with Luis Cabo Giorla, Jesús Hernández Tomás, Isidoro Diéguez Dueñas and Antonio Mije while the main Communist leadership center was established in Barcelona. During the Catalonia Offensive Checa, Dolores Ibárruri and Manuel Delicado formed a three-member secretariat that took the leadership of the party in the absence of José Díaz and installed itself near the government. After the government returned to the central-south zone, on 12 February 1939 the PCE headquarters were established in Elda, called the Dakar position, close to the government's Yuste position. At the time there were tensions in the Republican camp between supporters of continued war and of increased negotiation. Checa was one of the PCE leaders who started to prepare for a possible military uprising. At the same time he reiterated his support for president Juan Negrín and his policy of resistance to the end. He was part of the PCE delegation led by Dolores Ibárruri to express its support. Checa proposed, through Colonel Antonio Cordón García as intermediary, a series of military appointments that would keep the army and navy in reliable hands and prepare for the evacuation of civil and military Republican leaders.

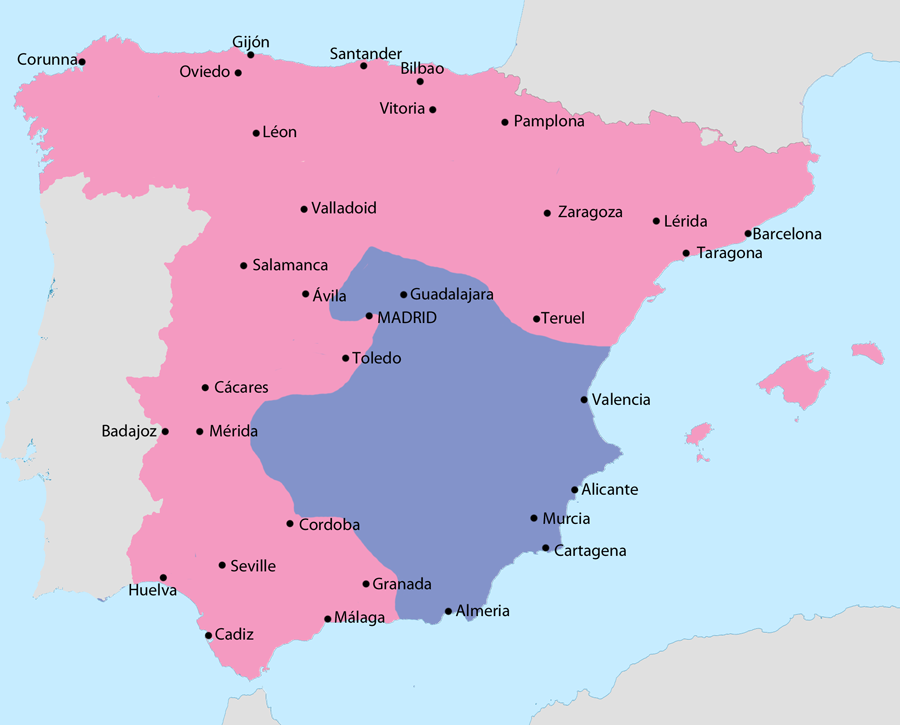
Spain in February 1939: Area under Nationalist control Area under Republican control

On 4 March 1939 there was a counter-insurrection in the Cartagena naval base that quickly became a pro-Nationalist uprising, but was reduced in two days by the 206th Mixed Brigade commanded by Artemio Precioso Ugarte. On 5 March 1939 Checa, Fernando Claudín, Palmiro Togliatti and other Communist leaders moved to the base of the 206th Mixed Brigade to insist on the need to suppress the rebellion. The coup of Colonel Segismundo Casado on 5 March 1939 caused the final flight of the government to the Monòver airbase, near Alicante. The PCE staff was concentrated in the same area and held an emergency meeting in which it was agreed to also leave the country by plane, which took place between 6 and 7 March. Only Checa stayed in Spain, with Fernando Claudín and Palmiro Togliatti, to evacuate all the communist cadres they could find and maintain the clandestine structure of the PCE. They were not able to contact Communist military units to oppose the rebellion because they were stopped by forces loyal to Casado and taken to jail in Alicante. They were released after appealing to the local commander of the Servicio de Información Militar (secret service), Prudencio Sayagués, an old friend of Claudin from their days in the Federación Universitaria Escolar (FUE). He moved them to Albacete.

Pursued by the Casado forces, Checa sent instructions to troops in Madrid led by Communists to negotiate with the supporters of Casado. The orders were not obeyed. Jesús Hernández Tomás, the Communist commissar of the army group in the central-south area, had beaten the rebels there. He formed a new Politburo and published a manifesto on behalf of the new leadership on 9 March 1939. Checa published a public statement on behalf of the PCE political bureau on 12 March 1939. Attempts to suppress the Casado uprising, particularly in Madrid, failed and the morale of the Communist cadres and militants collapsed. During the last days of the war Checa tried to organize the party for the underground, with a new leadership headed by Jesús Larrañaga.

=== Exile ===
On 24 March 1939 Checa ordered Artemio Precioso to have his troops capture the flying school of Totana. The last Communist leaders remaining in Spain, Checa, Hernández, Claudín and Togliatti, left on the available planes for French Algeria. This was shortly before the Republican air force was delivered to Franco. The leaders landed in Oran. From there they were sent to France. Checa and other Communist leaders embarked on 17 May 1939 for the Soviet Union. There he took part in meetings between Comintern and the PCE leadership to elucidate the causes of defeat. Checa wrote a report on the last days of the war that Gregorio Morán described as a "bland analysis". Both the Comintern and the Central Committee of the PCE blamed Checa, Togliatti, Uribe and Hernández for failing to defeat the Casado coup. The Comintern wanted to exempt Pasionaria from liability, whom they saw as replacing the seriously ill Díaz as general secretary. In the end the findings did not result in demotions or expulsions. Checa was a member of the committee formed by Comintern and the PCE for settling Spanish Communists who had fled to the Soviet Union.

In late July 1939 Checa was sent back to France. He was there when the pact was signed between Nazi Germany and the Soviet Union in August 1939, which led to the banning of the French and Spanish Communist parties. He left the country at the end of 1939. He was bound for the Americas, by order of Victorio Codovilla, and first settled in Cuba. From here there were maritime contacts with Franco's Spain that allowed contact with the interior. Soon after he traveled to Mexico. There he lived under the false identify of "Pedro Fernández Izquierdo" which he had obtained in Cuba. Although not part of the American secretariat of the PCE, he attended meetings on the party organization and Comintern missions in Latin America. His activities in Mexico are little known, but some reports implicate him in the murder of Leon Trotsky. According to a confidential report from another communist militant to the PCE leadership in Moscow, writing about Checa and the murder of Trotsky, "the party [in Mexico] has been informed that the [Mexican] police has a file containing detailed records of the activity of the Spanish comrades. It is recorded of Checa that he works on behalf of the GRU, has all the threads of the conspiracy in his hands and is living under an assumed name". Checa's health was delicate, since he had contracted tuberculosis during the Civil War. He was bedridden after March 1941, and died on 6 August 1942 due to complications from an appendectomy. The guard of honor for his body consisted of Joan Comorera, Antonio Mije, Ángel Álvarez and Federico Melchor.

== Works ==
- Checa, P. (1937). "Qué es y cómo funciona el Partido Comunista" (PDF). Madrid: Ediciones Europa-América. Archived from the original (PDF) on 2014-02-27.

== Sources ==
- Alba, Víctor (1983). The Communist Party in Spain. Transaction Publishers. ISBN 978-1412819992.
- Álvarez-Fernández, José Ignacio (2007). Memoria y trauma en los testimonios de la represion franquista/Memory and trauma in the testimonies of the Francoist Repression. Anthropos Editorial. p. 284. ISBN 978-8476588109.
- Carrillo, Santiago (2010). Los viejos camaradas. Planeta. ISBN 978-84-08-09280-3.
- Dimitrov, Georgi; Banac, Ivo (2003). The Diary of Georgi Dimitrov, 1933-1949. Annals of Communism. New Haven, Connecticut, US: Yale University Press. ISBN 9780300097948. OCLC 806373779.
- Elorza, Antonio; Bizcarrondo, Marta (1999). Queridos camaradas. La Internacional Comunista en España 1919-1939. Barcelona: Planeta. ISBN 978-84-08-02222-0.
- Estruch Tobella, Joan (1982). El PCE en la clandestinidad (1939-1956). Historia (1 ed.). Madrid, España: Siglo XXI de España editores. ISBN 978-84-323-0447-7. OCLC 9854251.
- Hernández Sánchez, Fernando (2010). El PCE en la Guerra Civil (PDF). Universidad Nacional de Educación a Distancia. Archived from the original (PDF) on 2014-03-04.
- Jorge, David (2023). De la revolución al antifascismo: La Komintern y el desarrollo de una causa transnacional. Madrid: Catarata. ISBN 978-84-135-2794-9.
- Morán, Gregorio (1986). Miseria y grandeza del Partido Comunista de España: 1939-1985. Barcelona: Planeta. ISBN 978-84-320-5852-3.
- Nieto, Felipe (2009). "Derrota, éxodo y dispersión de los comunistas españoles". Congreso internacional 1939: México y España (PDF). Centro de Investigaciones Históricas de la Democracia Española (CIHDE). Archived from the original (PDF) on 2013-06-22.
- Preston, Paul (2013). El zorro rojo: La vida de Santiago Carrillo. Debate. ISBN 978-84-9032-422-6.
- Romero Salvadó, Francisco J. (2013). Historical Dictionary of the Spanish Civil War. Scarecrow Press. p. 448. ISBN 978-0810880092.
- Ruiz, Julius (2012). El Terror Rojo. Barcelona: Grupo Planeta. ISBN 978-84-670-3433-2.
- Thomas, Hugh (1976). La Guerra Civil Española. Volumen II. Barcelona: Grijalbo Mondadori. ISBN 978-84-253-2769-8.
- Viñas, Ángel (2007). El escudo de la República. Barcelona: Crítica. ISBN 978-84-8432-892-6.
- Viñas, Ángel; Hernández Sánchez, Fernando (2009). El desplome de la República. Barcelona: Crítica. ISBN 978-84-9892-031-4.
- Viñas, Ángel; Hernández Sánchez, Fernando; Ledesma, José Luis; Preston, Paul (2012-09-21). "Puntualizaciones sobre Paracuellos". El País.
