= Felipe Sandoval =

Spanish trade unionist (1886–1939)

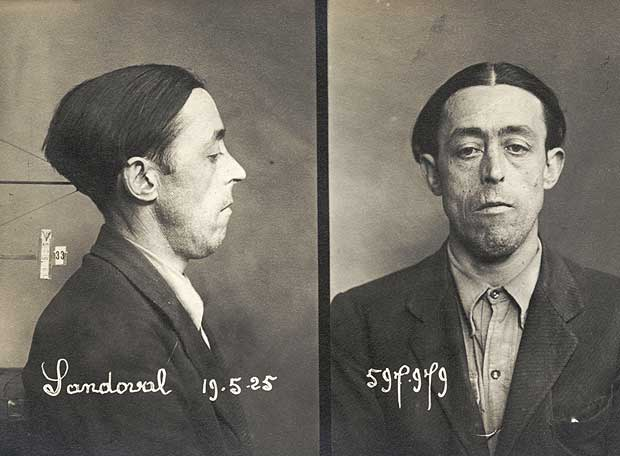
Police photograph of Felipe Sandoval made in France in 1925.

Felipe Emilio Sandoval Cabrerizo (26 May 1886 - 6 July 1939) (also known as "Doctor Muñiz") was a Spanish bricklayer, career robber, a killer and spy who associated with anarchist activities in France and very prominently in Spain during the Spanish Civil War.

== Biography ==
He was born in the poor former suburb of Las Injurias in Madrid. His mother had moved from Torrelaguna to the capital to escape hunger and she worked as a washerwoman in the Manzanares district. He did not know his father. Sandoval spent his childhood in an orphanage. In his youth, he worked as a bricklayer but also began his criminal career. In 1919, he was imprisoned in cárcel Modelo de Barcelona (Barcelona Model Prison) after committing a robbery. An unsuccessful escape attempt resulted in a severe beating on Christmas Eve which permanently disfigured his face. He was regarded variously by fellow prisoners as a man of no beliefs or ideas, a professional criminal or simply a killer or thug. He left Spain and settled in Paris, where from 1926 he would attend meetings of the anarchist Juan García Oliver, a founder of the armed group Los Solidarios which had been organized to counter oppressive practices by employers and government sectors against the unions in Barcelona; at these meetings he would find other anarchists who'd fled Spain. Los solidarios was also a precursor to the Federación Anarquista Ibérica (FAI) in Spain, which became allied to the Confederación Nacional del Trabajo (CNT), a grouping of anarcho-syndicalist trade unions.

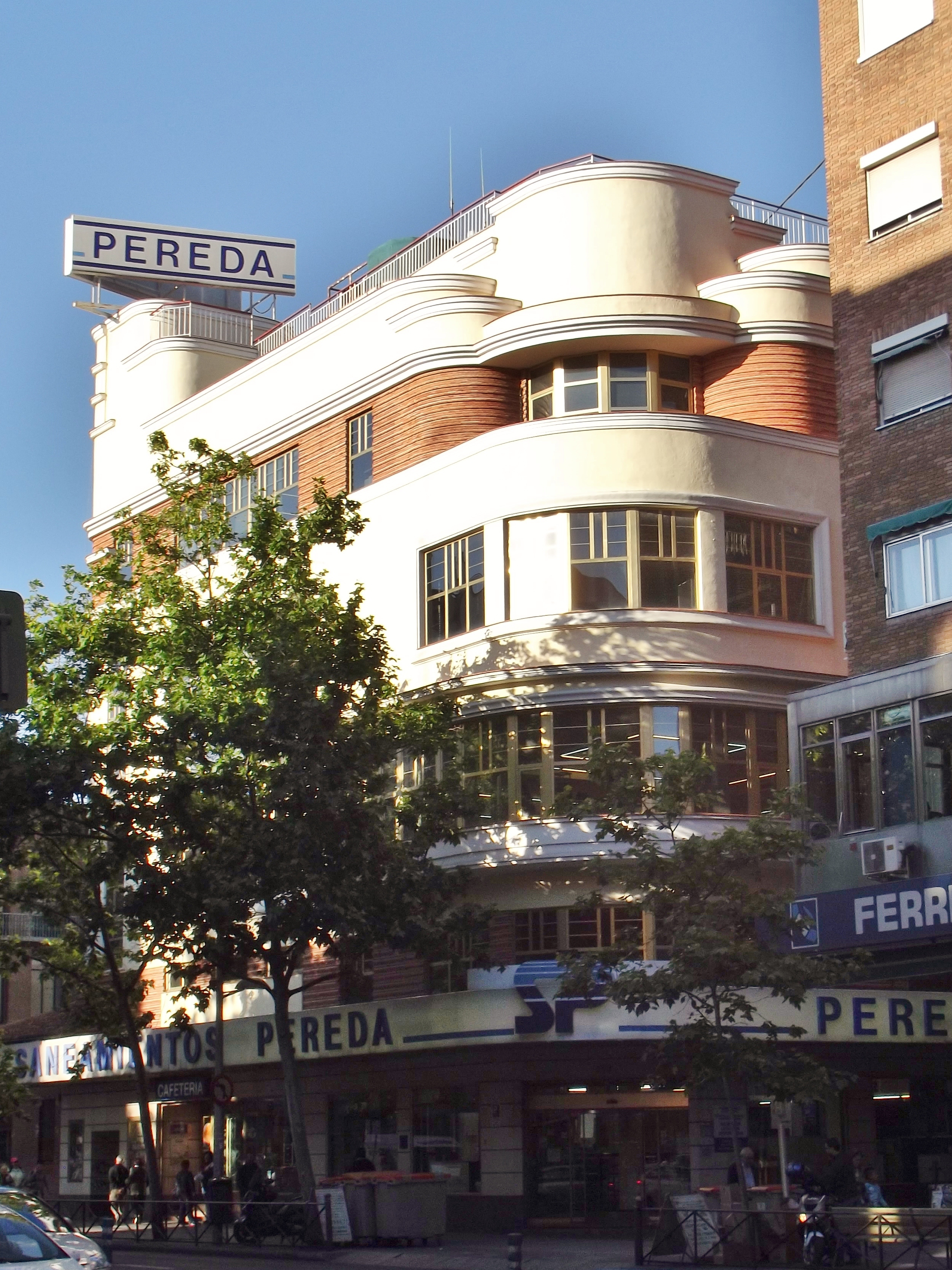
The former cinema Europa (now used for sanitation storage), used as a checa base by Sandoval and others during the Spanish Civil war for multiple atrocities.

He didn't espouse any statements of anarchism, his interest being manifested in a series of attacks and robberies which he organised with a premise of financing anarchism after his return to Madrid. In 1932, he stole 35,000 pesetas from the home of Agapito Velasco whom he accused of withholding funds from the canteens of the Asistencia Social. He robbed a branch of the Banco de Vizcaya, taking 40,000 pesetas. After stealing an arsenal of weapons, he was captured and sent to Colmenar Viejo prison but escaped after injuring a prison officer. At the beginning of the Spanish Civil War, in July 1936, he was recovering from a bout of tuberculosis in the cárcel Modelo de Madrid when prisoners were released, many joining anarchist groups. He was released two weeks later. Some local CNT members were integrated into the informally-titled checa de Fomento [the word checa taken from revolutionary Russia to mean a committee or unit]. It was officially called the Comité Provincial de Investigación Pública de Madrid (CPIP), which received Spanish state funding to unify and control repression of the Nationalist rebels. Sandoval went to Ricardo Amor Nuño Pérez - in overall charge of the checas - and was ordered to join the checa of the cinema Europa (in the suburb of Cuatro Caminos), which became notorious for its violence, torture, rapes and murders. Sandoval's group of assassins - all released criminals - roamed the city in a car targeting pro-Nationalists elements and taking revenge on former captors by killing prison staff. On 21 August 1936, he led two groups of the CPIP militia to the cárcel Modelo de Madrid to continue questioning Falangist prisoners, who had been searched, interrogated, harangued and robbed by militia since 15 August following rumours of Falangist sympathisers amongst prison staff and a planned escape attempt. Stoked further by a Nationalist-rebel air-raid over the prison area on 22 August, an angry Republican crowd - fed by the rumours over days - had grown outside the prison demanding the release of prisoners and baying for punishment of the right-wingers inside. Hundreds of prisoners demanded to be released. Sandoval told them he would release them if they joined the CNT. An external machine-gun attack - later presumed to have been set up by anarchist militiamen at Sandoval's direction - killed seven right-wing prisoners and injured others. Under pressure, officials sought advice on the possible release, but Sandoval decided to go ahead with it regardless, releasing about two hundred, some of whom rampaged in the prison. The CPIP militia then looked through the prison records, chose over thirty right-wing prisoners and killed them after a brief "trial"; the dead included liberals, conservatives and former government ministers in protective custody, shocking to both Republican and Nationalist sentiments. Journalists from El Socialista had gained access to the prison and the situation was condemned in the next edition. The government arranged Tribunales Populares rapidly to try and quell the lawlessness.

The system of checas was dismantled by the Junta de Defensa de Madrid, after an edict from the communist Santiago Carrillo on 12 November, which had followed months of systematic targeting and massacre of thousands more prisoners in Republican-held areas. Sandoval went to work as a CNT spy in Barcelona and Valencia, returning to Madrid later. At the end of the Civil War in 1939, he was captured and taken to Madrid as part of the Expedición de los 101, a group of politicians, union leaders and others from the Republican side captured in Alicante having failed to flee Spain. Still suffering from tuberculosis, he was tortured, severely kicked and beaten for days and told to clean up his own blood. Already dismissed and regarded with disgust by other prisoners, he was forced to confess and denounce prisoners to their faces. In their anger, they encouraged him to commit suicide. He killed himself by falling from the window of a house on Calle de Almagro in Madrid, which was a makeshift police station as there were so many Republican prisoners elsewhere. No one claimed his body. On 6 July 1939, he was buried in the Cementerio de la Almudena in eastern Madrid.
