= Antonio Mije =

Spanish politician (1905–1976)

Antonio Mije García
- Born: 24 September 1905; Seville
- Died: 1 September 1976 (aged 70); Paris
- Occupations: Baker, union leader
- Known for: Spanish Civil War politics

Minister of War of the Madrid Defense Council
- In office 6 November – 1 December 1936
- President: José Miaja
- Preceded by: Defense Council established
- Succeeded by: Isidoro Diéguez Dueñas (as Minister of the Militias)

Antonio Mije García (24 September 1905 – 1 September 1976) was a member of the Spanish Communist Party who became a deputy for Seville in the Second Spanish Republic. He served in various senior positions during the Spanish Civil War (1936–39). After the war he lived in France, Mexico and Czechoslovakia. He managed to retain his position as a party executive during the internecine struggles of the long years of exile.

== Early years ==
Antonio Mije García was born on 24 September 1905 in Seville, to a working-class family. As a child he became an apprentice in a bakery, and in 1919 he joined the Confederación Nacional del Trabajo (CNT, National Confederation of Labour) while only 13 years old. At the start of the 1920s he was charged with the treasury of the Baker's union of Seville, and later he became secretary and president of this union. Although self-taught, he directed the union's journal La Aurora, and later the Seville union weekly Voz Proletaria. In 1926 he was admitted to the leadership of the anarcho-syndicalist group attached to the International Red Aid organization. Mije was a militant among the CNT unionists until 1928, when he joined the Internacional Sindical Roja (Profintern).

In 1930, after the end of the dictatorship of Miguel Primo de Rivera, Mije was elected secretary-general of the CNT Reconstruction Committee. He was very active in the labor disputes in Seville. With the proclamation of the Second Spanish Republic he became one of the communist leaders in Seville. In June 1931 he was named assistant union secretary of the regional committee of the Communist Party in Andalusia. He was named secretary general of the Confederación General del Trabajo Unitaria (CGTU) in August 1932 and joined the secretariat of the Spanish Communist Party (Partido Comunista Español, PCE).

In 1932 the Spanish Communist Party made a major change in direction when it abandoned the Comintern slogan "Workers' and Peasants' Government" and adopted "Defense of the Republic". Mije was among the new leaders of the party who succeeded José Bullejos. The others were José Díaz, Vicente Uribe, Juan Astigarrabía and Jesús Hernández Tomás. Mije moved to Madrid in 1932. In November 1933 he ran unsuccessfully for deputy of Seville. In the aftermath of the Asturian miners' strike of October 1934 he was forced to obtain false papers to avoid arrest. He became involved in propaganda for the party. In February 1936 he was a Popular Front candidate for Seville, as PCE representative, and was elected as Deputy to the Cortes, where he joined the communist minority.

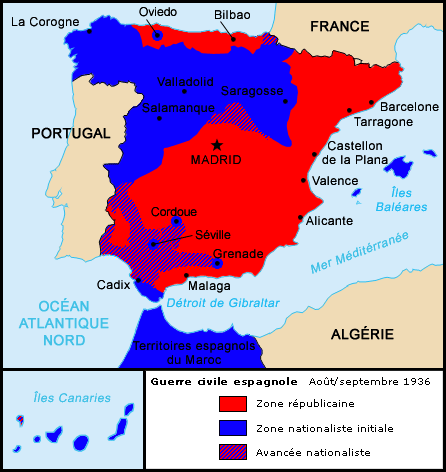
Spain in August 1936

== Civil war ==
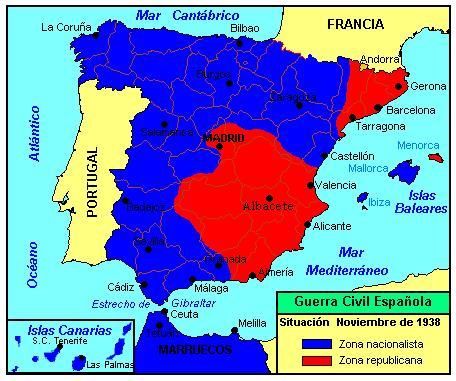
Spain in November 1938

After the military revolt of July 1936 Mije was at first assigned to represent the PCE in the War Ministry, assigned the rank of colonel. In November 1936, the government evacuated to Valencia. The Political Bureau of the PCE remained in Madrid, unlike the leaders of the other parties. Pedro Checa and Antonio Mije negotiated with General José Miaja for participation of the Communists in the Madrid Defense Council (Junta de Defensa de Madrid). The communists were given three ministries, War, Supplies and Public Order, which were led by Antonio Mije, Pablo Yagüe and Santiago Carrillo, respectively. The Defense Council was restructured and renamed the Junta Delegada de Defensa de Madrid, or the Delegate Defense Council of Madrid, to comply with an order of 25 November 1936 by President Francisco Largo Caballero. This was to affirm that the council was subordinate to the government. Mije was replaced by Isidoro Diéguez as Militias delegate.

In May 1937 Mije was made an inspector of the Army's operations in the South, making his base in Úbeda. From the end of June 1937 Mije again assumed the functions of union secretary on the PCE Central Committee, and was involved in issues of the war economy, mobilization and the production of arms factories. He wrote for the dailies Frente Rojo and Verdad, and directed the PCE organ Mundo Obrero. When the Republican forces were defeated in the Battle of the Ebro (July–November 1938) and General Francisco Franco's troops reached the Mediterranean, Mije stayed in Madrid with Jesús Hernández Tomás, Pedro Checa, Luis Cabo Giorla and Isidoro Diéguez Dueñas while the main Communist leadership center was established in Barcelona. Mije participated in the last session of the Cortes in Spain, held in the Castillo de San Fernando in Figueres on 1 February 1939, then escaped to France.

== Last years ==
Mije spent the following months in Paris. In November 1939 Mije moved to Orléans, and soon after moved to Mexico, where he joined Vicente Uribe and other party leaders. His work in Mexico provoked much criticism from the main CPE leaders who had taken refuge in the Soviet Union, and from the Communist International. Mije managed to steer through the complex internal power struggles in the PCE, which became acute after the secretary-general José Diaz died in March 1942. The Spanish Communist leader Pedro Checa died in Mexico on 6 August 1942 due to complications from an appendectomy. The guard of honor for his body consisted of Joan Comorera, Antonio Mije, Ángel Álvarez and Federico Melchor. Mije allied himself with Dolores Ibárruri, Pasionaria, in opposition to Jesús Hernández Tomás, who was eventually expelled from the party. He remained in Mexico until the start of 1946. He lived in Paris from 1946 to 1950, then moved to Prague, Czechoslovakia for several years. After the PCE meeting in Bucarest in April and May 1956, in which Vicente Uribe was disgraced, Mije kept his membership of the executive.

Antonio Mije died in Paris at the start of September 1976 when he was planning to return to Seville, having obtained a passport. His body was flown to Seville, where he was buried in the San Fernando civil cemetery on 11 September 1976, in a ceremony attended by over 3,000 people including several leaders of the Communist Party.

== Publications ==
- Mije, Antonio (1937). El Papel de los sindicatos en los momentos actuales: [conferencia pronunciada en el cine Capitol de Valencia, el día 1 de enero de 1937]. Ediciones del Partido Comunista de España. p. 14.
- Mije, Antonio (1937). Discurso. Edicions U.G.T. p. 21.
- Mije, Antonio (1937). Por una potente industria de guerra: discurso pronunciado en el Pleno ampliado del C.C. del Partido Comunista de España, celebrado en Valencia los días 5, 6, 7 y 8 de Marzo de 1937. Partido Comunista de España. Comisión Nacional de Agit-Prop. p. 15.
- Mije, Antonio (1938). Unidad y movilización del pueblo madrileño: [conferencia pronunciada en Madrid, el 15 de Mayo de 1938]. Partido Comunista - Comité Provincial de Madrid. p. 20.
- Mije, Antonio (1943). Con el pueblo ó contra el pueblo. España Popular. p. 16.
- Mije, Antonio (1943). Discurso pronunciado en la sesión de clausura. FOARE. p. 15.
- Mije, Antonio (1946). Ante nuevas luchas del pueblo español: discurso pronunciado. p. 16.
- Mije, Antonio; Uribe, Vicente (1947). Ni capitulación ni franquismo sin Franco: luchamos por la demoracia y la República. Mundo obrero. p. 31.

== Sources ==
- Alexander, Robert J. (1999). The Anarchists in the Spanish Civil War. Janus Publishing Company Lim. ISBN 978-1-85756-400-6.
- Bolloten, Burnett (1991). The Spanish Civil War: Revolution and Counterrevolution. Univ of North Carolina Press. ISBN 978-0-8078-1906-7.
- Elorza, Antonio; Bizcarrondo, Marta (1999). Queridos camaradas. La Internacional Comunista en España 1919-1939. Barcelona: Planeta. ISBN 84-08-02222-9.
- Morán, Gregorio (1986). Miseria y grandeza del Partido Comunista de España: 1939-1985 (in Spanish). Barcelona: Planeta. ISBN 84-320-5852-1.
- Peirats, José (2011). The CNT in the Spanish Revolution. PM Press. ISBN 978-1-60486-207-2.
- Preston, Paul (2013). El zorro rojo: La vida de Santiago Carrillo. Debate. ISBN 978-84-9032-422-6.
- Rey, Leandro Álvarez (2009). Los Diputados por Andalucía de la Segunda República, 1931-1939: diccionario biográfico. F-M. Centro de Estudios Andaluces. ISBN 978-84-937855-0-5.
- Teba, Juan (1976-09-12). "Entierro en Sevilla de Antonio Mije". El País. Seville.
