= Toribio Martínez Cabrera =

Spanish military personnel (1874–1939)

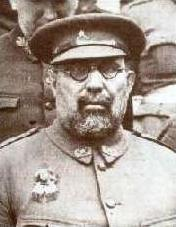
- Born: 13 April 1874; Santa Colomba de Somoza, León, Spain
- Died: 23 June 1939 (aged 65); Paterna, Spain
- Cause of death: Execution by firing squad
- Occupation: Soldier
- Known for: Chief of Staff during the Spanish Civil War
- Military career
- Branch: Spanish Army (1892-1936); Spanish Republican Army (1936-1939)
- Service years: 1892 – 1939
- Units: 4th Artillery Battalion; 54th Infantry Regiment; 12th Division (1922-1927); 15th Division (1927-1929)
- Conflicts: Cuban War of Independence; Spanish Civil War

Toribio Martínez Cabrera (13 April 1874 – 23 June 1939) was a Spanish soldier who fought in his youth against the rebels in Cuban War of Independence (1895–1898). After returning to Spain he rose steadily through the ranks. He remained loyal to the Republic during the Spanish Civil War (1936–1939) and was appointed Chief of Staff. After the defeat of the Army of the North in 1937 he was arrested and imprisoned, but was later released and made commander of Madrid. He was captured at the end of the civil war and executed.

== Early years (1874–1903) ==
Toribio Martínez Cabrera was born in Andiñuela in the municipality of Santa Colomba de Somoza, León, on 13 April 1874. His parents were Vicente Martínez Crespo and Juana Cabrera Fernández. At the age of 18 he volunteered for the army and on 24 August 1892 became a private in the 4th Artillery Battalion of Ferrol, Galicia. In 1894 he entered the Infantry Academy in Toledo, and on 21 February 1896 graduated as second lieutenant of the infantry.

Martínez Cabrera was assigned to the 54th Infantry Regiment of Luzón based in Lugo. The regiment was dispatched to Cuba, where it arrived on 6 September 1896. He participated in several battles in the Cuban War of Independence, including that of Asiento el Viejo and Santa Rita on 31 May 1897, for which he was awarded the Medal of Military Merit. On 30 July 1897 he left Cuba on the mail steamer Alfonso XIII, reaching Corunna on 13 August 1897. On 1 September 1897 he entered the Superior School of War (Escuela Superior de la Guerra), where he remained until in 1903 while being assigned to various regiments in different parts of Spain. He married María Pilar Cabrera y García in 1898.

== Senior officer (1903–1936) ==
After completing his studies in 1903 Martínez Cabrera was promoted to captain and assigned to the military mapping commission in Cáceres, where he remained until 1906, when he became a professor at the Superior School of War. He was promoted to Commander on 28 November 1911. In 1920 he was a lieutenant colonel, assigned to the Military Governor of Huesca, and then to the Captaincy General of the First Region. From 1921 to 1922 he was Civil Governor of Badajoz. He was then assigned to the general staff of the 12th Division, and made secretary to the Military Governor of Biscay. On 4 July 1927 he was named Chief of Staff of the 15th Division and secretary to the Military Governor of Corunna.

Martínez Cabrera was promoted to Colonel in 1929 and assigned to the military government of Ferrol. In 1931 he was placed in charge of studies at the Superior School of War. He was promoted to Brigadier General in 1934 and made Chief of Staff of the Inspectorate. That year he organized a major military exercise in the León mountains with 20,000 participants including General Francisco Franco.

== Spanish Civil War (1936–1939) ==
When the Spanish Civil War began in July 1936 Martínez Cabrera was Military Governor of the Cartagena naval base. He was one of the few brigadier-generals to remain loyal to the Republic and to be employed actively in the Republican army. He prevented the base from falling into the hands of the rebels. On 20 November 1936 he was named Chief of Staff based in Valencia. Prime Minister Francisco Largo Caballero appointed him to this post in place of the communist Manuel Estrada Manchón. As Chief of Staff Martínez Cabrera was subjected to interrogation after Málaga was lost in January 1937. He was placed under the direct orders of the Minister of National Defense after his release. Kirill Meretskov, future marshal and chief of staff of the Red Army, was appointed adviser to Martínez Cabrera. In February 1937 Martínez Cabrera authorized the Anarchist Marato Column to form a brigade formed only of its members. In this he either bypassed or defied Meretzkov.

On 8 March 1937 the Italians began an advance on the Guadalajara sector, which at first overcame all resistance. The communist government ministers Vicente Uribe and Jesús Hernández Tomás demanded the resignation of Martínez Cabrera. The advance was checked, but Martínez Cabrera was replaced. After the fall of Gijón on 21 October 1937, the last stronghold in the north, Martínez Cabrera was arrested and charged with treason by the Republican authorities, as were Generals José Asensio Torrado and Fernando Martínez-Monje. All three were later found innocent and were released. Martínez Cabrera was appointed military governor of Madrid in December 1938 by the government of Juan Negrín in place of the retired General Manuel Cardenal Dominicis. In March 1939 he backed the coup of Colonel Segismundo Casado, who appointed him undersecretary in the National Defense Council (Consejo Nacional de Defensa). With the collapse of the Republic at the end of March he refused to flee the country. He was brutally beaten and arrested by Policía Armada in Valencia and was executed by military police in Paterna on 23 June 1939.

== Sources ==
- Alpert, Michael (2013-02-28). The Republican Army in the Spanish Civil War, 1936–1939. Cambridge University Press. ISBN 978-1-107-32857-0.
- Bolloten, Burnett (1991). The Spanish Civil War: Revolution and Counterrevolution. Univ of North Carolina Press. ISBN 978-0-8078-1906-7.
- "El General Toribio Martínez Cabrera". La Maragatería (in Spanish).
- Romero Salvadó, Francisco J. (2013-03-14). Historical Dictionary of the Spanish Civil War. Scarecrow Press. ISBN 978-0-8108-8009-2.
- Thomas, Hugh (2013-11-06). The Spanish Civil War: Revised Edition. Random House Publishing Group. ISBN 978-0-8041-5216-7.
