= Fernando Claudín =

Spanish communist ideologist and historian

Fernando Claudín Pontes
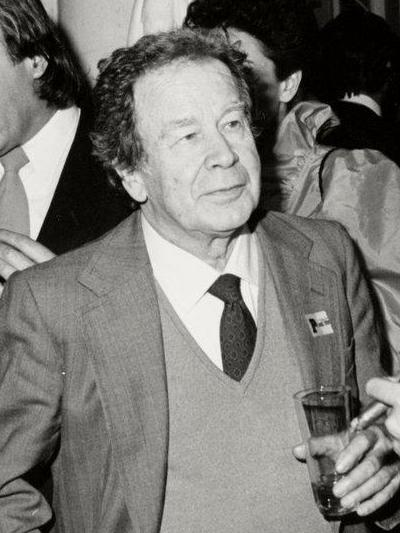
- Fernando Claudín in 1983
- Born: 24 August 1913; Zaragoza, Aragon, Spain
- Died: 16 May 1990 (aged 74); Madrid, Spain
- Occupations: Journalist, Communist leader
- Known for: The Communist Movement: From Comintern to Cominform

Fernando Claudín Pontes (24 August 1913 – 16 May 1990) was a Spanish communist ideologist and historian best known for his two volume study The Communist Movement: From Comintern to Cominform.

== Life ==
Fernando Claudín Pontes was born in Zaragoza, Aragon, on 21 August 1915. Later he moved to Madrid, where he enrolled in the Escuela Superior de Arquitectura. In 1932, he became a member of the Communist Youth (Juventudes Comunistas). In 1936, he was elected to the leadership of the Unified Socialist Youth (Juventudes Socialistas Unificados, JSU) as director of its journal Ahora. During the Spanish Civil War (1936–39), he was appointed head of the Press Cabinet under Santiago Carrillo, Councillor of Public Security in the Madrid Defense Council. Other key posts in this department were held by Luis Rodríguez Cuesta (secretary of the Council), Federico Melchor (Security, Assault and the National Guard), Segundo Serrano Poncela (DGS), and Alfredo Cabello (Emisión Radiofónica).

After the Republicans were defeated by the forces led by General Francisco Franco in 1939, Claudín began a long exile in Moscow, France, Mexico, Cuba, Chile and Argentina. From 1943 to 1945, Claudín worked in the Communist Party of Spain (Partido Comunista de España, PCE) headquarters in Argentina. In 1945, he moved to France. From 1947 to December 1954, he represented the Spanish communists in Moscow. In 1955, he returned to Paris as a member of the PCE executive committee.

Following the 20th Congress of the Communist Party of the Soviet Union in 1956 Claudin found himself increasingly at odds with an official party line which overwhelmingly supported Soviet policies regardless of the actions of the Soviet Union itself. He was expelled from the PCE in 1965 for his open disagreement with official policy. In June 1975, he returned secretly to Spain and worked at the Editorial Siglo XXI until 1980, when he was named a director of the Fundación Pablo Iglesias. He joined the Spanish Socialist Workers' Party (Partido Socialista Obrero Español , PSOE) and was named president of the Foundation in 1988. He died in Madrid on 16 May 1990.

== Publications ==
Among other works, Claudín wrote a critical Marxist history of the Soviet-aligned Communist movement La crisis del movimiento comunista. De la Komintern al Kominform (1970), which was translated into English and published as The Communist Movement: From Comintern To Cominform in 1975.

== Sources ==
- Claudín Pontes, Fernando (1915–1990), MCN Biografías
- "Fernando Claudín Pontes, presidente de la Fundación Pablo Iglesias murió ayer". La Vanguardia: 15. 1990-05-17.
- Volodarsky, Boris (2014-11-06). Stalin's Agent: The Life and Death of Alexander Orlov. Oxford University Press, USA. ISBN 978-0-19-965658-5.
