= Lorenzo Íñigo Granizo =

Spanish trade unionist (1910–1991)

- Born: 10 August 1910; Ledanca, Guadalajara, Castile, Spain
- Died: 30 April 1991 (aged 80); Madrid, Spain
- Occupations: Metalworker, trade union leader
- Known for: Secretary-general of the CNT

Minister of War Industries of the Madrid Defense Council
- In office 15 January – 23 April 1937
- President: José Miaja
- Preceded by: Mariano García Cascales
- Succeeded by: Defense Council disestablished

Lorenzo Íñigo Granizo (10 August 1910 – 30 April 1991) was a Spanish metalworker and anarchist trade unionist. He played an important role during the Spanish Civil War (1936–39) and later became head of the anarchist trade union federation, the Confederación Nacional del Trabajo (CNT).

== Early years ==
Lorenzo Íñigo Granizo was born in Ledanca, Guadalajara, Castile on 10 August 1910. In 1916, he moved to Madrid with his father and eight brothers. His father died when he was 9, and he began working at the age of 10. When he was 14 he became a metalworker. He joined the metalworkers union of the Confederación Nacional del Trabajo (CNT) in 1931. In 1932, he joined the Federación Anarquista Ibérica (FAI). Íñigo was also an activist in the Juventudes del Ateneo del Barrio Bajo and a member of the Federación Ibérica de Juventudes Libertarias (FIJL, Iberian Federation of Libertarian Youth). In 1934, he became secretary of the Juventudes Libertarias Madrileñas (Madrid Libertarian Youth) and of the metalworkers union. He became regional secretary of the FIJL. He represented the metalworkers at the 1936 CNT Congress, and joined the national confederal committee under Martínez Prieto.

== Spanish Civil War ==
At the start of the Spanish Civil War (1936–39) Íñigo participated in the general strike in Valencia and Alcoy. He returned to Madrid, where he remained after the government fled to Valencia. He and Manuel González Marín represented the FIJL from December 1936 on the Madrid Defense Council. Inigo succeeded Amor Nuño on the council as delegate responsible for War Industries, holding this office until the council was dissolved on 23 April 1937. The Madrid defense industry was organized mainly due to his efforts. After the Defense Council was dissolved he represented the Juventudes Libertarias in the defense section of the national committee of the CNT until February 1938. Íñigo was appointed secretary-general of the FIJL at the Congress of Valencia in February 1938. In February 1939, he and other anarchist leaders met with Prime Minister Juan Negrín. Inigo represented the Libertarian Youth, Juan López Sanchez the CNT and José Grunfeld the FAI.

When the Nationalist forces split the Republic into two parts Íñigo remained in the south. After the National Defense Council was formed, a new National Committee of the Libertarian Movement was formed on 7 March 1939 with Juan López as secretary-general. Íñigo was appointed Propaganda Secretary of the Comité Nacional del Movimiento Libertario Español. This group met several times during the month, apparently for the last time on 27 March 1943. The committee continued to call for resistance, and demanded that anarchist leaders who had escaped to France when Catalonia fell should return to the central-south area. The Republican army totally collapsed in the last week of March 1939, and only a few of the anarchist leaders were able to escape by ship.

== Later career ==
Íñigo was arrested in Alicante after the victory of the Nationalist forces in April 1939 and held in various camps and prisons until April 1945. After his release he joined the clandestine CNT organization, became secretary of the committee of the Center Region, and in 1946 was appointed secretary of the National Committee of the CNT. This decision was ratified at the national plenum of 7–8 March 1946. The next month he was arrested along with most of the leadership of the CNT. A new national committee was named with Enrique Marco Nadal as secretary-general. On 22 November 1947, Iñigo was sentenced to 15 years in prison.

Iñigo was conditionally released on 15 August 1952 in very poor health. After being released he worked for the Valencian urban transport as editor of its magazine. In the early 1960s, he was involved in the "cincopuntiste" agreements between the former CNT leaders and the Francoist vertical unions, which he expected to allow the CNT to survive after Franco. He died in Madrid on 30 April 1991.

== Sources ==
- Alexander, Robert J. (1999). The Anarchists in the Spanish Civil War. Janus Publishing Company. ISBN 978-1-85756-412-9.
- Baer, James A. (2015-04-10). Anarchist Immigrants in Spain and Argentina. University of Illinois Press. ISBN 978-0-252-09697-6.
- Bolloten, Burnett (1991). The Spanish Civil War: Revolution and Counterrevolution. Univ of North Carolina Press. ISBN 978-0-8078-1906-7.
- "Lorenzo Íñigo Granizo". CNT Puerto Real (in Spanish). CNT.
- R.D. (2010-09-05). "IÑIGO GRANIZO, Lorenzo". Los de la Sierra (in Spanish).
