= Ricardo Amor Nuño Pérez =

Spanish anarchist (1913–1940)

Ricardo Amor Nuño Pérez (1913–1940) was a Spanish anarchist, known for his role in the Spanish Civil War.

== Biography ==
At the beginning of the Spanish Civil War, in July 1936, he was secretary of the Madrid CNT. He was part of the juries of the so-called «Popular Courts», created after the Cárcel Modelo massacre. Nuño would have been in favor of the "walk" undertaken by the anarchist groups during the first weeks of the war, arguing that "expeditious justice strengthened the revolutionary morale of the people and engaged them in the struggle to life or death that we had engaged.” As Felipe Sandoval would later state, Amor Nuño would have had almost total control over the Madrid Checa.

In November 1936, he joined the Madrid Defense Council, occupying the Ministry of War Industries. Nuño reportedly participated in the November 7 meeting with representatives of the CNT and the JSU that served as preparation for the subsequent Paracuellos massacres.

At the beginning of December, he became the CEO of Transportation. At that time, Amor Nuño had a romantic relationship with the daughter of a nationalist soldier, whom he had made his personal secretary and even brought to Board meetings—which meant she had access to important information. As a result of this relationship, he had seriously neglected his responsibilities. Some members of the CNT suspected that his sentimental partner was in fact a nationalist spy. A meeting of the CNT, the FAI and the FIJL resolved to expel Nuño Amor. At that time, he announced his resignation from his position, arguing health reasons. In this sense, Jorge Martínez Reverte pointed out that Amor Nuño left his post due to "fear". (Note: Apparently the anarchist leader Cipriano Mera grabbed him by the neck and, after hitting him against the wall, told him that “he deserved to be killed.”)

During the rest the war he did not hold any relevant position. On 4 May 1937 he was arrested in Barcelona for his involvement in the events of May.

There are several versions of his death. Paul Preston maintains that he was arrested in Alicante at the end of the war, and died in the General Security Directorate in Madrid as a result of the beatings to which he was subjected. Julius Ruiz, on the other hand, maintains that he was tried by Franco's courts and sentenced to death—despite the favorable testimonies of well-known rightists—and was executed in 1940. (Note: Gregorio Gallego, leader of the Libertarian Youth, knew Amor Nuño personally and described him as follows: «Amor Nuño generally had more nerves and excitement than head, and when he gave himself to reflect, which happened rarely, he did not trust himself. ”)

== Bibliography ==
- Bolloten, Burnett (1991). The Spanish Civil War: Revolution and Counterrevolution. University of North Carolina Press.
- Martínez Reverte, Jorge (2004). La Batalla de Madrid (in Spanish). Crítica.
- Preston, Paul (2013). El Holocausto Español. Odio y Exterminio en la Guerra Civil y después (in Spanish). Barcelona: Debolsillo.
- Ruiz, Julius (2014). The 'Red Terror' and the Spanish Civil War: Revolutionary Violence in Madrid. Cambridge University Press.
