= Communist Youth Union of Spain =

Communist Youth Union of Spain Unión de Juventudes Comunistas de España
- Secretary: Provisional commission
- Founded: 1921; 1961 (reconstituted)
- Succeeded by: Unified Socialist Youth (1936–1961)
- Headquarters: Olimpo 35, 28043, Madrid
- Ideology: Communism; Marxism-Leninism
- Political position: Far-left
- National affiliation: Communist Party of Spain
- International affiliation: World Federation of Democratic Youth
- Anthem: La Joven Guardia

The Communist Youth Union of Spain (Spanish: Unión de Juventudes Comunistas de España, UJCE; also simply the Communist Youth) is a Marxist-Leninist youth political organization that fights for the interests of the working class and its youth, it was formed by young communists in the Spanish state. It serves as the youth organization of the Communist Party of Spain, although since June 2023, this relationship has been suspended due to internal tension and attempts at intervention by the PCE towards the UJCE's structure.

== History ==
The UJCE merged with the Federation of the Socialist Youth of Spain (FJS) to form the Juventudes Socialistas Unificadas (JSU) in 1936, following the policy lines friendly to the concept of popular front established in the 7th World Congress of the Comintern.

It was formally reconstituted under the UJCE name in 1961.

UJCE is a member of the World Federation of Democratic Youth.

The UJCE's main task is to work towards organizing the youth movement, engaging with working-class and student youth with the goal of emancipating the working class through socialist revolution. It aims to develop the necessary tactical steps to raise class consciousness and work towards the construction of a communist society, achieved through revolution, the dictatorship of the proletariat, and socialism.
