= Isidoro Diéguez Dueñas =

Former minister

- Born: 19 January 1909; Puertollano, Ciudad Real, Spain
- Died: 21 January 1942 (aged 33); Madrid, Spain
- Occupation: Bricklayer

Minister of the Militias of the Madrid Defense Council
- In office 2 December 1936 – 23 April 1937
- President: José Miaja
- Preceded by: Antonio Mije (as Minister of War)
- Succeeded by: Defense Council disestablished

Isidoro Diéguez Dueñas (19 January 1909 – 21 January 1942) was a Spanish bricklayer who joined the Spanish Communist Party, fought in the Spanish Civil War (1936–39) and went into exile. When he returned from Mexico to Portugal he was arrested by the police and handed over to the Spanish authorities, who executed him.

== Early years ==
Isidoro Diéguez Dueñas was born in Puertollano, Ciudad Real on 19 January 1909. In 1924 he joined the Union of Bricklayers in Madrid, and in 1932 became a member of the Spanish Communist Party (Partido Comunista Español, PCE). He was named delegate for the Radio Sur union. In the Spanish Civil War he fought on the Somosierra and Guadarrama fronts, and in the headquarters in Montaña, Getafe and Cuatro Vientos. Diéguez was head of the PCE's Provincial Committee of Madrid, became a member of the PCE central committee in 1937, and joined the Politburo in 1938.

On 2 December 1936 the Madrid Defense Council was reorganized with General José Miaja as chairman. Diéguez was Militias delegate in the junta. Other PCE members were Santiago Carrillo (Public Order) and Pablo Yagüe (Supplies). On 13 February 1937 Diéguez demanded that "doubtful and suspect elements" be removed from the army, and a few days later the Communist leaders demanded the dismissal of José Asensio Torrado. Diéguez was appointed to the Junta's War Council, ranked second after Antonio Mije García.

== Exile ==
In March 1939 Segismundo Casado launched an anti-communist uprising in Madrid supported by the militant anarchist Cipriano Mera. Isidoro Diéguez organized resistance to the revolt with other PCE members. After Casado succeeded, Diéguez managed to escape to Valencia, where he took ship for France. There he contacted Francisco Antón Sanz and with the help of SERE left for America in August 1939. He sailed to New York City in August 1939, and reached Mexico in September 1939.

== Return and death ==
In the spring of 1941 Diéguez was charged with directing development of party policy in Spain. He sailed in the Portuguese ship Gaza under false papers, and landed in Lisbon in mid June. Other Spanish communists in Lisbon around that time were Jesús Larrañaga, Manuel Asarta and Eleuterio Lobo. Two South American activists were arrested in Madrid in September 1941, Eleuterio Lobo Martín ("Leandro") and Mari Ibarra ("Sionin"). This led to arrests in Vigo of Eladio Rodríguez González, Francisco Barreiro Barciela and others. This in turn led to the arrests of the Spanish communist group in Lisbon by the police of the Salazar regime.

The group in Lisbon was arrested in September 1941 and handed over to the Spanish in October 1941. They were questioned in the Puerta del Sol, then imprisoned in Porlier prison in Madrid. On 19 January 1942 they were tried by a court martial, and six of the group were sentenced to death. Isidoro Diéguez Dueñas was executed by firing squad against the wall of the East Cemetery in Madrid on the morning of 21 January 1942. (Note: The communists who were executed with Dueñas were Jesús Larrañaga Churruca, Manuel Asarta Imaz, Jesús Girabau Estévez, Jesús Gago Correas, Francisco Barreiro Barciela and Eladio Rodriguez González.) He was aged 33.

== Sources ==
- Bolloten, Burnett (1991). The Spanish Civil War: Revolution and Counterrevolution. Univ of North Carolina Press. ISBN 978-0-8078-1906-7.
- "Isidoro Diéguez Dueñas". Pública (in Spanish).
- Montero, Tomás (2007-04-14). "Listado fusilados por el franquismo en el Cementerio del Este" (in Spanish). Memoria y Libertad.
- Peirats, José (2011). The CNT in the Spanish Revolution. PM Press. ISBN 978-1-60486-207-2.
- Preston, Paul (2011-04-08). El holocausto español: Odio y exterminio en la Guerra Civil y después. Penguin Random House Grupo Editorial España. ISBN 978-84-9992-049-8.
- R.D. (2007-08-13). "DIEGUEZ DUEÑAS, Isidoro". Los de la sierra (in French).
