= Julio Just Gimeno =

Spanish journalist & politician (1894–1976)

Minister of Public Works
- In office 15 September 1936 – 17 May 1937
- Preceded by: Vicente Uribe
- Succeeded by: Bernardo Giner de los Ríos

Personal details
- Born: 5 March 1894 Alboraya, Valencia, Spain
- Died: 30 October 1976 (aged 82) Paris, France
- Occupation: Journalist

Julio Just Gimeno (5 March 1894 – 30 October 1976) was a Spanish journalist and politician who was minister of public works during the early part of the Spanish Civil War (1936–1939).

== Life ==
=== Early years ===
Just was born in Alboraya on 5 March 1894. His father was a friend of Vicente Blasco Ibáñez and moved in Republican circles. Just began his education in Valencia, studied engineering in Madrid, then won a scholarship to continue his studied in Paris. There he came in contact with leading French intellectuals and politicians. He completed his engineering studies successfully, but did not take up his profession. Instead he became a journalist and a translator.

=== Republican activist ===
In 1915 Just joined the Juventud Nacionalista Republicana (Republican Nationalist Youth). He contributed to the newspaper El Pueblo, the organ of the Partido Unión Republicana Autonomista (PURA, Autonomous Republican Union Party). He was a founder, editor or contributor to various Republican newspapers and magazines including Alma Joven, Renovación, Línea, València Nova, La Voz Valenciana and Tauia de Lletres Valencianes. During the dictatorship of Miguel Primo de Rivera he helped disseminate illegal literature promoting the ideas of Blasco Ibáñez. In 1924 he was named chairman of the Casa de la Democracia, the Republican headquarters in Valencia. He was arrested several times for his opposition to the regime. In 1929 he published his first book, Blasco Ibáñez i València. This was followed by other books on political themes.

=== Second Spanish Republic ===
On 14 April 1931 Just proclaimed the Republic from the balcony of the Valencia city hall. He was elected deputy for Valencia in the national elections of 1931, 1933 and 1936. In the first two he ran on the radical blasquismo platform. He left this movement with Vicent Marco Miranda, Faustino Valentín Torrejón and Héctor Altabás Alio in 1934 after a split over support of a Valencian state within a federal Spain, and became an activist for the new Valencian nationalist party Esquerra Valenciana. He was a Freemason as well as a radical. In 1934 he joined the Republican Union led by Diego Martínez Barrio, and then the Republican Left led by Manuel Azaña.

In 1936 Just was appointed head of Water Works and Ports. He developed a major irrigation scheme to contribute to the agrarian reform. During the Spanish Civil War Just was appointed minister of public works in the government of Francisco Largo Caballero on 15 September 1936. He succeeded Vicente Uribe Galdeano, who had been appointed interim minister on 4 September 1936. He began construction of the fortifications of Madrid and of shelters in Madrid and Valencia. Due to disagreements with the socialist Juan Negrín he left office when Negrín formed his government. He remained in Valencia until the end of the civil war when he escaped on a British ship on 27 March 1939, and reached France the next month.

=== Later years ===
During World War II Just was interned in the concentration camp of Camp Vernet near Le Vernet, Ariège from 19 February 1941 to 6 December 1941. He died in Paris on 30 October 1976.

== Publications ==
Just's books include:

- Blasco Ibáñez i València (1929)
- Siembra Republicana (1930)
- Ayer y hoy de los republicanos (1936)
- Bajo las luces de la Guerra (1936)
- Bajo las alas de la Victoria de Samotracia
- Blasco Ibáñez: precursor y guía de la República y Veteranos de la República.

== Sources ==
- Ferrer Benimeli, José Antonio (1996). La masonería en la España del siglo XX. Univ de Castilla La Mancha. ISBN 978-84-89492-47-9.
- "Julio Just Gimeno". Censo-Guía de Archivos de España e Iberoamérica. Ministerio de Educación, Cultura y Deporte.
- Urquijo y Goitia, José Ramón de (2008). Gobiernos y ministros españoles en la edad contemporánea. Editorial CSIC - CSIC Press. ISBN 978-84-00-08737-1.
