= Madrid Defense Council =

Ad-hoc governing body during the Spanish Civil War (1936–39)

Madrid Defense Council Spanish: Junta de Defensa de Madrid
- Former subdivision of Spanish Republic
- 1936–1937
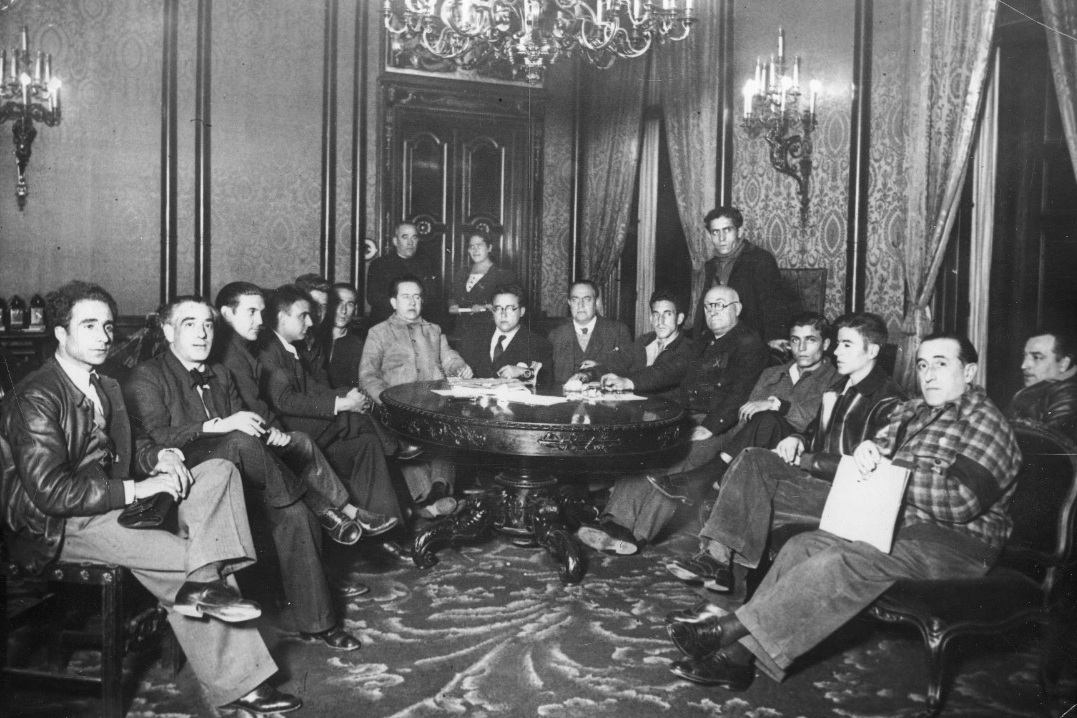

- Flag Coat of arms

- Location of the Province of Madrid within Spain
- Capital: Madrid
- Demonym: madrileño, -ña
- Area
  - Coordinates: 40.4189°N 3.6919°W
- Government: Defense Council
  - Type: Council Republic
  - Motto: "Long live Madrid without government!" Spanish: Viva Madrid sin gobierno!
- President
  - 1936–1937: José Miaja
- Coat of arms
- Historical era: Spanish Civil War
  - Government flees to Valencia: 6 November 1936
  - Established: 7 November 1936
  - Siege of Madrid begins: 8 November 1936
  - Battle of Jarama: 6–27 February 1937
  - Battle of Guadalajara: 8–23 March 1937
  - Disestablished: 23 April 1937
  - Fall of Madrid: 28 March 1939
| Preceded by | Succeeded by |
| Spanish Republic | Spanish Republic |

The Madrid Defense Council (Spanish: Junta de Defensa de Madrid) was an ad-hoc governing body that ran Madrid, Spain, for about six months during the Spanish Civil War (1936–39). It was formed in November 1936 after the Spanish Republican government had fled to Valencia when General Francisco Franco's forces advanced on Madrid. It was expected that the city would fall within a few days, but the arrival of the International Brigades halted the rebel advance, and the situation settled into a stalemate. The council was dominated by communists, who had superior organization and propaganda to the other groups. Their policy was to organize the militias into regular troops and focus on defeating the enemy, rather than to undertake revolutionary activity. As time passed there was growing tension between the communists and more radical groups. The council was dissolved in April 1937 and replaced by a new city council.

== First days ==
At the start of November 1936 the rebel armies led by General Francisco Franco approached Madrid, brushing aside the untrained and ill-equipped militias they encountered. The government of the Second Spanish Republic under Francisco Largo Caballero had done nothing to prepare the capital's defenses for fear of alarming the population. The government fled from Madrid to Valencia on 6 November 1936, leaving General José Miaja to govern the city and mobilize civilians for defense. Miaja was told to defend the capital "at all costs", an apparently hopeless assignment. In sealed orders, which Miaja opened after the politicians had left, he was given authority to create a Defense Council.

The international press reported that Madrid would not be defended, and General Franco declared prematurely that the city had been liberated. Radio Lisbon even reported Franco's victorious entry into the city. On 7 November the first troops of Franco's Army of Africa reached the Casa de Campo on the edge of the city. Formation of the Madrid Defense Council was announced that day,

By mandate of the political and trade union organizations, and in accordance with the order of the Government of the Republic, there has been constituted in Madrid a Junta of Defense. It is made up of all the organizations which form part of the Government and which contribute their effort to the struggle taking place at the gates of Madrid.

The Defense Council was desperately short of men and munitions. However, Franco's forces were over-extended, with only 3,000 men available to push into the city, and Franco was naturally cautious. The first units of the International Brigades reached the city on 8 November 1936 and were immediately thrown into action. As more units came into action the rebel advance was halted. By 23 November a stalemate had been reached, with both sides exhausted.

== Council composition ==
Miaja, a conservative but also a republican loyalist, was very close to the Spanish Communist Party (Partido Comunista Español, PCE), whose propaganda made him a symbol of Madrid's resistance to Fascism. Many later claimed that Miaja was himself a PCE member. (Note: Miaja let himself be controlled by the communists in the Defense Council, who had their own motives for making him a hero. However, during the last days of the Republic he supported the anti-communist coup of Colonel Segismundo Casado and was the symbolic president of Casado's ephemeral government, the National Defence Council.) Pedro Checa and Antonio Mije arranged with Miaja for strong representation of communists in the council. Miaja had been instructed that membership should include all parties "in proportion to their representation in the government." The communists gained more seats in the council than they should have on that basis. The PCE and the affiliated Unified Socialist Youth (JSU: Juventudes Socialistas Unificadas) were the best organized groups with the most effective propaganda, and dominated the council. The anarcho-syndicalist CNT also readily joined the council, declaring "Long live Madrid without government!" The anti-Stalinist POUM (Partido Obrero de Unificación Marxista, Workers' Party of Marxist Unification) was excluded from the council at the insistence of the communists. The POUM paper La Batalla claimed that the Soviet ambassador had intervened to have POUM excluded.

Because most of the leading politicians had left the city, the members of the council were, as Vicente Rojo Lluch wrote, mostly "young men who had voluntarily decided to remain in the city ready to participate actively in its defense." According to a group of parliamentarians from Britain who visited Madrid early in the struggle, "The Civil Government seems to be largely in the hands of young men, sometimes barely of age. They are enthusiastic working-class lads mostly, who appear to be honestly and energetically trying to do their best." The communists held most of the important posts, and were strong in the Propaganda and Press department. The German communist Kurt Hager, alias Félix Albin, was head of the official Radio Madrid. The communists gained prestige and influence from the contribution of the International Brigades and the supply of tanks, airplanes and advisers that began to be delivered from the Soviet Union.

== Activities ==
The council became the de facto government of Madrid. It was based in the War Ministry. Santiago Carrillo, Councillor of Public Order, appointed five of his closest associates to the key positions in his department. All were communist party members, or would join soon after. The communists soon had full control of the police. Pablo Yagüe's first action as Councillor of Supplies was to impose controls that limited shoppers to buying food at one store. If supplies there were exhausted they could try other stores in the same district. As the siege took effect, he had to deal with upward pressure on prices.

The Defense Council was restructured and renamed the Junta Delegada de Defensa de Madrid, or the Delegate Defense Council of Madrid, to comply with an order of 25 November 1936 by Largo Caballero. This was to affirm that the council was subordinate to the government. After the change of name the members were called Delegates rather than Councillors. On 2 December 1936 the Defense Council reconvened with Miaja as chairman. Various changes took place in the weeks that followed.

On 12 December 1936 newspapers reported that the council had decided that the militia groups would be organized into regular army units, and only these units would be eligible for pay and provisions. On 23 December 1936 Yagüe was stopped at a roadblock on the Zaragoza road manned by anarchists. When he tried to drive on, he was shot in the back. Due to the severity of his wounds, Yagüe was relieved as a member of the Council and replaced by Luis Nieto de la Fuente, his deputy. On 24 December General Miaja proclaimed that militias should withdraw from all checkpoints around and within the city, to be replaced by Security and Assault Guards. There were various incidents where CNT or PCE members were found dead in the streets with their membership cards in their mouths. A decree was issued to disarm militiamen who did not have a permit from the Public Order Delegate, but the Council rejected the decree.

On 16 January 1937 the Council reorganized its propaganda department to give it greater control over censorship, exhibitions and posters. Most of the posters were produced by the UGT's Sindicato de Dibujantes Profesionales (Union of Professional Draftsmen). The council's posters stressed the importance of the primary goal of defending the "democratic republic" and defeating the rebels, and attacked revolutionaries who wanted radical social and political changes. They wanted a centralized military force, and expected women to leave the front and replace men in the farms and factories. This was counter to the beliefs of some parts of the CNT and of the Trotskyist POUM, who demanded changes such as collective ownership of all means of production.

On 29 January 1937 Isidoro Diéguez Dueñas proposed that the POUM radio station in Madrid and its newspaper El Combatiente Rojo should be seized, since he claimed they had been devoted "solely and exclusively to combating the government and the Popular Front." The measure was approved unanimously. José Cazorla then declared that he would take over all the POUM's buildings and vehicles, since it was now "illegal". This was also passed without opposition. The communist press said the council's decision to close the paper was proof that the POUM was fascist. After the fall of Málaga in February 1937 the junta launched a campaign to purge the army of appointees by Largo Caballero who resisted its authority.

By April 1937 there was increasing tension between the CNT and the communists, and it seemed that the Socialists, Anarchists and Republicans were starting to form an anti-communist front. Largo Caballero was feeling increasingly isolated, and resented the public acclaim of Miaja's success. He dissolved the council on 23 April 1937. The pretext was an article in the CNT journal Solidaridad Obera that disclosed that the JSU, which was responsible for public order, had closed an anarchist paper in which Melchor Rodríguez García, Director of Prisons in Madrid, had revealed that the Communists were operating secret prisons. Rodríguez had published details of torture in these prisons, and blamed the communist Security Delegate José Cazorla. The Defense Council was replaced by a new city council.

== Members ==
The council members were:

| Position | Start | End | Officeholder | Organization | Political affiliation |
|---|---|---|---|---|---|
| President | 6 November 1936 | 23 April 1937 | General José Miaja | EPR | Independent |
| Secretary | 6 November 1936 | 1 December 1936 | Fernando Frade | PSOE | Socialist |
| Secretary | 2 December 1936 | 23 April 1937 | Máximo de Dios | PSOE | Socialist |
| Public Order (Police) | 6 November 1936 | 27 December 1936 | Santiago Carrillo | JSU | Communist |
| Public Order (Police) | 27 December 1936 | 23 April 1937 | José Cazorla Maure | JSU | Communist |
| War | 6 November 1936 | 1 December 1936 | Antonio Mije | PCE | Communist |
| Militias | 2 December 1936 | 23 April 1937 | Isidoro Diéguez Dueñas | PCE | Communist |
| War Industries | 6 November 1936 | 1 December 1936 | Amor Nuño | CNT | Anarcho-Syndicalist |
| War Industries | 2 December 1936 | 15 January 1937 | Mariano García Cascales | FIJL | Anarchist |
| War Industries | 15 January 1937 | 23 April 1937 | Lorenzo Íñigo Granizo | FIJL | Anarchist |
| Supplies | 6 November 1936 | 23 December 1936 | Pablo Yagüe | UGT | Communist |
| Supplies | 23 December 1936 | 23 April 1937 | Luis Nieto de la Fuente | UGT | Communist |
| Communications and Transport | 6 November 1936 | 1 December 1936 | José Carreño España | IR | Left Republican |
| Transport | 2 December 1936 | 15 January 1937 | Amor Nuño | CNT | Anarcho-Syndicalist |
| Transport | 15 January 1937 | 23 April 1937 | Manuel González Marín | CNT | Anarcho-Syndicalist |
| Finance | 6 November 1936 | 1 December 1936 | Enrique Jiménez González | UR | Republican Union |
| Information and Liaison | 6 November 1936 | 1 December 1936 | Mariano García Cascales | FIJL | Anarchist |
| Propaganda and Press | 2 December 1936 | 23 April 1937 | José Carreño España | IR | Left Republican |
| Evacuation | 6 November 1936 | 1 December 1936 | Francisco Caminero Rodríguez | PS | Syndicalist |
| Evacuation | 2 December 1936 | 23 April 1937 | Enrique Jiménez González | UR | Republican Union |
| Services | 2 December 1936 | 23 April 1937 | Francisco Caminero Rodríguez | PS | Syndicalist |

== Sources ==
- Alba, Victor; Schwartz, Stephen (2008). Spanish Marxism Versus Soviet Communism: A History of the P.O.U.M. in the Spanish Civil War. Transaction Publishers. ISBN 978-1-4128-3494-0.
- Alexander, Robert J. (1999). The Anarchists in the Spanish Civil War. Janus Publishing Co. Ltd. ISBN 978-1-85756-412-9.
- Basilio, Dr Miriam (2014). Visual Propaganda, Exhibitions, and the Spanish Civil War. Ashgate Publishing, Ltd. ISBN 978-1-4094-6481-5.
- Bolloten, Burnett (1991). The Spanish Civil War: Revolution and Counterrevolution. Univ of North Carolina Press. ISBN 978-0-8078-1906-7.
- Castillo, Santiago (2008). Historia de la UGT (in Spanish). Siglo XXI de España Editores. ISBN 978-84-323-1385-1.
- Colodny, Robert Garland (2009). The Struggle for Madrid: The Central Epic of the Spanish Conflict, 1936–37. Transaction Publishers. ISBN 978-1-4128-3924-2.
- Dimitrov, Georgi (2008). The Diary of Georgi Dimitrov, 1933–1949. Yale University Press. ISBN 978-0-300-13385-1.
- Fernández Rodríguez, Carlos (2007). "El grupo de "información, seguridad y recuperación": trece antifranquistas fusilados injustamente por la barbarie franquista". Comunicaciones del II Congreso de historia del PCE: De la resistencia antifranquista a la creación de IU. Un enfoque social. Fundación de Investigaciones Marxistas. ISBN 978-84-87098-44-4. Archived from the original on 4 March 2014.
- Jackson, Michael W. (1994). Fallen Sparrows: The International Brigades in the Spanish Civil War. American Philosophical Society. p. 16. ISBN 978-0-87169-212-2.
- Peirats, José (2011). The CNT in the Spanish Revolution. PM Press. ISBN 978-1-60486-207-2.
- Preston, Paul (2011). El holocausto español: Odio y exterminio en la Guerra Civil y después. Penguin Random House Grupo Editorial España. ISBN 978-84-9992-049-8.
- Preston, Paul (2013). El zorro rojo: La vida de Santiago Carrillo. Debate. ISBN 978-84-9032-422-6.
- Romero Salvadó, Francisco J. (2013). Historical Dictionary of the Spanish Civil War. Rowman & Littlefield. ISBN 978-0-8108-5784-1.
