= Jesús Hernández Tomás =

Spanish politician (1907–1971)

Minister of Education and Fine Arts
- In office 4 September 1936 – 17 May 1937
- Preceded by: Francisco Barnés Salinas
- Succeeded by: Segundo Blanco

Minister of Education and Health
- In office 17 May 1937 – 5 April 1938
- Preceded by: Federica Montseny (Health)
- Succeeded by: Segundo Blanco

Personal details
- Born: 1907 Murcia, Spain
- Died: 11 January 1971 (aged 63–64) Mexico City, Mexico
- Occupation: Politician

Jesús Hernández Tomás (1907 – 11 January 1971) was a Spanish communist leader. During the Spanish Civil War (1936–1939) he was Minister of Education and Fine Arts, then Minister of Education and Health. After the war he went into exile in Oran, Moscow and then Mexico. He was expelled from the party in 1944 for disloyalty to the leadership, and purged from the official history of the party after writing a book in 1953 critical of the Stalinist role in the Civil War.

== Early years ==
Jesús Hernández Tomás was born in Murcia in 1907. He was one of the founders of the Communist Party in Biscay. In 1922 he was part of the guard of Óscar Pérez Solís, Secretary General of the Spanish Communist Party (Partido Comunista Español, PCE). Hernández participated in the failed attack on the socialist Indalecio Prieto. In 1927 he was a member of the Central Committee of the Communist Youth Hernández was arrested in 1929 and released the next year. Hernández went to the Soviet Union around the time the Second Spanish Republic was proclaimed in 1931. He studied at the Leninist School in Moscow.

In 1932 the Spanish Communist Party made a major change in direction when it abandoned the Comintern slogan "Workers' and Peasants' Government" and adopted "Defense of the Republic". Hernández Tomás was among the new leaders of the party who succeeded José Bullejos. The others were José Díaz, Vicente Uribe, Antonio Mije and Juan Astigarrabía. That year Hernández became a member of the PCE Politburo in charge of agitprop. He returned to Spain in 1933, and was made editor of the PCE journal Mundo Obrero (Worker's World).

== Civil war ==
Hernández was elected Deputy for Cordoba in the 1936 elections. After the outbreak of Spanish Civil War (1936–1939), on 8 August 1936 he said clearly "We cannot talk today of the proletarian revolution in Spain, because the historical circumstances do not permit it." The Stalinists did indeed provide substantial support for the Giral and Caballero governments, including important military aid from the USSR. President Francisco Largo Caballero appointed Hernández Minister of Education and Fine Arts on 4 September 1936.

The Socialist Largo Caballero found himself increasingly isolated, and by February 1937 was demanding that his ministers confirm their support for him, particularly the communist ministers Vicente Uribe and Jesús Hernández. On 15 May 1937 Uribe and Hernández caused the collapse of Largo Caballero's government. The trigger was a disagreement in a cabinet meeting over the May Days violence in Barcelona, which the communists blamed on the Anarchist CNT and FAI and the POUM. They demanded that the POUM be banned and its leaders arrested as "fascists". Largo Caballero refused to act, and most of the ministers walked out of the meeting.

On 17 May 1937 the new President Juan Negrín appointed Hernández Minister of Education and Health. Hernández launched reforms that treated education as a social function. The PCE campaign against the CNT continued. On 2 August 1937 Hernández told reporters after a cabinet meeting "the cabinet has been concerned with examining what measures needed to be taken ... in order to forestall and curtail with the utmost vigour any attempted distirubance or upset which certain extremist elements, who are the instruments of fascism, may seek to provoke." Hernández conducted a campaign against Indalecio Prieto, the Minister of National Defense. Prieto left office early in 1938 due to his efforts.

Hernández was replaced by Segundo Blanco in a cabinet reshuffle in April 1938 and was appointed political commissar in the South Central area. When the Republican forces were defeated in the Battle of the Ebro (July–November 1938) and General Francisco Franco's troops reached the Mediterranean, Hernández stayed in Madrid with Pedro Checa, Luis Cabo Giorla, Isidoro Diéguez Dueñas and Antonio Mije while the main Communist leadership center was established in Barcelona. Hernández later took virtual leadership of the party. Hernández was forced to leave Madrid after the March 1939 coup d'état by Segismundo Casado.

== Later career ==
After the fall of the Republican government in March 1939 Hernández went into exile in Oran, and then in Moscow. He was elected to the Executive Committee of the Communist International. He lost influence during the power struggle that followed the suicide of José Díaz in March 1942. In 1943 Joseph Stalin sent him to Mexico, and in 1944 he was expelled from the PCE for working against the party executive.

In 1953 Hernández published memoirs of the Civil War under the title Yo fui ministro de Stalin (I Was Stalin's Minister). The French translation was published as La Grande trahison (The Great Betrayal). The book revealed how Andrés Nin had been tortured and then killed, the Procès de Moscou tribunal and other aspects of Stalinist interference. PCE loyalists called Hernández a "bon vivant", "womanizer", "degenerate" and other derogatory terms.

In 1953 Hernández founded the short-lived Independent Communist Party, based in Bucharest. The party was pro-Yugoslav. After it dissolved he left politics and returned to Mexico where he lived until his death in 1971. He was omitted from the official PCE history published in Paris in 1960. In her memoirs Dolores Ibárruri referred to him as "the other communist minister", but would not name him.

== Publications ==
- Jesus Hernandez (1951). La URSS en la guerra del pueblo español.
- Jesus Hernandez (1951). A los comunistas de España.
- Jesus Hernandez (1953). Yo fui ministro de Stalin: Memorias de la guerra civil Española 1936-39.
- Jesus Hernandez (1974). En el país de la gran mentira: Segunda parte del libro Yo fui un ministro de Stalin.

== Sources ==
- Alexander, Robert J. (1999). The Anarchists in the Spanish Civil War. Janus Publishing Company Lim. ISBN 978-1-85756-400-6.
- Alpert, Michael (2013-02-28). The Republican Army in the Spanish Civil War, 1936-1939. Cambridge University Press. ISBN 978-1-107-02873-9.
- Beevor, Antony (2012-08-23). The Battle for Spain: The Spanish Civil War 1936-1939. Orion Publishing Group. ISBN 978-1-78022-453-4.
- Bolado Somolinos, Jose Manuel (1975). "Del Ministerio de Instrucción Pública y Bellas Artes a la Cartera de Educación, Cultura y Deporte. 100 Minostros para un centenario.". Revista de educación (in Spanish). Ministerio de Educación. ISSN 0034-8082.
- Bookchin, Murray (2005-06-08). The Third Revolution. A&C Black. ISBN 978-0-8264-7801-6.
- Hernández Sánchez, Fernando (2007-06-16). Comunistas sin partido, Jesús Hernández, ministro en la Guerra Civil, disidente en el exilio (in Spanish). Editorial Raíces.
- Dimitrov, Georgi (2008-10-01). The Diary of Georgi Dimitrov, 1933-1949. Yale University Press. ISBN 978-0-300-13385-1.
- Elorza, Antonio; Bizcarrondo, Marta (1999). Queridos camaradas. La Internacional Comunista en España 1919-1939. Barcelona: Planeta. ISBN 84-08-02222-9.
- Graham, Helen (1991-06-28). Socialism and War: The Spanish Socialist Party in Power and Crisis, 1936-1939. Cambridge University Press. ISBN 978-0-521-39257-0.
- "Jesús Hernández Tomás". Fuenterrebollo.
- Peirats, José; Ealham, Chris (2005). The CNT in the Spanish Revolution. ChristieBooks.com. ISBN 978-1-873976-24-1.
- Preston, Paul; Mackenzie, Ann L. (1996). The Republic Besieged: Civil War in Spain 1936-1939. Edinburgh University Press. ISBN 978-0-7486-0861-4.
