= Francisco Largo Caballero =

Spanish politician and trade union leader

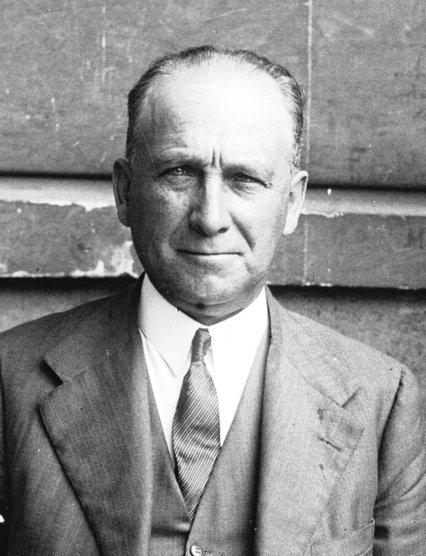
- Largo Caballero in 1927

Prime Minister of Spain
- In office 4 September 1936 – 17 May 1937
- President: Manuel Azaña
- Preceded by: José Giral Pereira
- Succeeded by: Juan Negrín López

Minister of War
- In office 4 September 1936 – 17 May 1937
- Prime Minister: Himself
- Preceded by: Juan Hernández Saravia
- Succeeded by: Indalecio Prieto

President of the Spanish Socialist Workers' Party
- In office 12 October 1932 – 1 July 1936
- Preceded by: Remigio Cabello
- Succeeded by: Ramón González Peña

Minister of Labour and Social Security
- In office 14 April 1931 – 12 September 1933
- Prime Minister: Manuel Azaña
- Preceded by: Gabriel Maura Gamazo
- Succeeded by: Carles Pi i Suner

Member of the Congress of Deputies
- In office 14 July 1931 – 31 March 1939
- Constituency: Madrid
- In office 18 May 1918 – 1 June 1919
- Constituency: Barcelona

Personal details
- Born: 15 October 1869 Madrid, Kingdom of Spain
- Died: 23 March 1946 (aged 76) Paris, France
- Party: PSOE

Francisco Largo Caballero (15 October 1869 – 23 March 1946), nicknamed "The Spanish Lenin", was a Spanish politician and trade unionist who served as the prime minister of the Second Spanish Republic during the Spanish Civil War. He was one of the historic leaders of the Spanish Socialist Workers' Party (PSOE) and of the Workers' General Union (UGT). Although he entered politics as a moderate leftist, after the 1933 general election in which the conservative CEDA party won the majority, he took a more radical turn and began to advocate for a socialist revolution, supporting the failed Revolution of 1934 in Asturias.

After the victory of the Popular Front in the 1936 Spanish general election and following the July coup, Largo Caballero served as prime minister of Spain during the Spanish Civil War from 4 September 1936 until 17 May 1937. Exiled in France following the Republican defeat in 1939, Largo Caballero was imprisoned in the Sachsenhausen concentration camp after the Nazi invasion of France.

== Early life ==
Born in Madrid, as a young man he made his living stuccoing walls and was self-educated, having left school at the age of seven. He participated in a construction workers strike in 1890 and joined the PSOE in 1894. In his early career, Largo Caballero was largely focused upon municipal politics and burial societies, and disapproved of the techniques and activities of the Confederación Nacional del Trabajo (CNT). Upon the death in 1925 of party founder Pablo Iglesias, Largo Caballero became head of the party and of the UGT.

== Political career ==
Moderate in his positions at the beginning of his political life, he advocated maintaining a degree of UGT cooperation with the dictatorial government of General Miguel Primo de Rivera, which permitted the union to continue functioning under his military dictatorship (which lasted from 1923 to 1930). While he was in the position of Councilor of State for Labor, Largo Caballero refused an invitation to a palace ball, having accepted a position in government without wishing to demonstrably support the regime. This cooperation was the start of Largo Caballero's political conflict with Indalecio Prieto, who opposed all collaboration with Primo de Rivera.

Largo Caballero was Minister of Labor Relations between 1931 and 1933 in the first governments of the Second Spanish Republic, headed by Niceto Alcalá-Zamora, and in that of his successor Manuel Azaña. Largo Caballero attempted to improve the conditions of landless labourers (braceros) in the rural south. On 28 April 1931 he introduced a decree of municipal boundaries to prevent the importation of foreign labour while there remained unemployed workers within the municipality. In May he established mixed juries (jurados mixtos) to arbitrate in agrarian labour disputes, and introduced an eight-hour working day in the countryside. Alongside these measures, a decree on obligatory cultivation prevented owners from using their land as they wished. He enjoyed great popularity among the masses of workers, who saw their own austere existences reflected in his way of life. Reversing his stance on collaborationism, in the summer of 1933 he argued "to accomplish socialist aims in a bourgeoise democracy is impossible".

In the elections of 19 November 1933, the right-wing Spanish Confederation of the Autonomous Right (CEDA) won power in Spain, beginning the period called the Black Biennium by the left. The government, nominally led by the centrist Alejandro Lerroux of the Radical Republican Party, was dependent on CEDA's parliamentary support. Responding to this reversal of fortune, Largo abandoned his moderate positions and became more openly far left. In the January 3, 1934 edition of El Socialista, the PSOE newspaper, he wrote "Harmony? No! Class war! Hatred for the criminal bourgeoise to the death!" A few weeks later, the PSOE compiled a new platform that called for the nationalization of all land, dissolution of all religious orders and the confiscation of their property, and the dissolution of the army, to be replaced by socialist militias. According to Angel Smith, Largo Caballero's radicalism was "almost purely rhetorical" and had the damaging effect of frightening right-wingers while not meaningfully preparing for a revolution. In early October 1934, after three CEDA ministers entered the government, he was one of the leaders of the failed armed rising of workers (mainly in Asturias) which was forcefully put down by the CEDA-dominated government. The failed revolution hurt Largo Caballero politically, and Prieto and Azaña gained the initiative.

He defended the pact of alliance with the other leftist political parties and trade unions, such as the Communist Party of Spain (PCE) and the anarchist trade union, the CNT, reflecting his embrace of radical ideologies. Once again, this placed him at odds with Prieto. He declared, that he, Largo Caballero, "shall be the second Lenin" whose aim is to create a union of Iberian Soviet republics.

After the Popular Front won the elections in February 1936, president Manuel Azaña proposed that Prieto join the government, but Largo blocked these attempts at collaboration between PSOE and the Republican government. Largo dismissed fears of a military coup, and predicted that, were it to happen, a general strike would defeat it, opening the door to the workers' revolution.

In the event, the coup attempt by the colonial army and the right came on 17 July 1936. Largo Caballero was a proponent of arming workers at the outset of the war, saying "A government that refuses to arm its workers is a fascist government". While not immediately successful, further actions by rebellious army units sparked the Spanish Civil War (1936–1939), in which the republic was ultimately defeated and destroyed.

=== Prime Minister of Spain ===
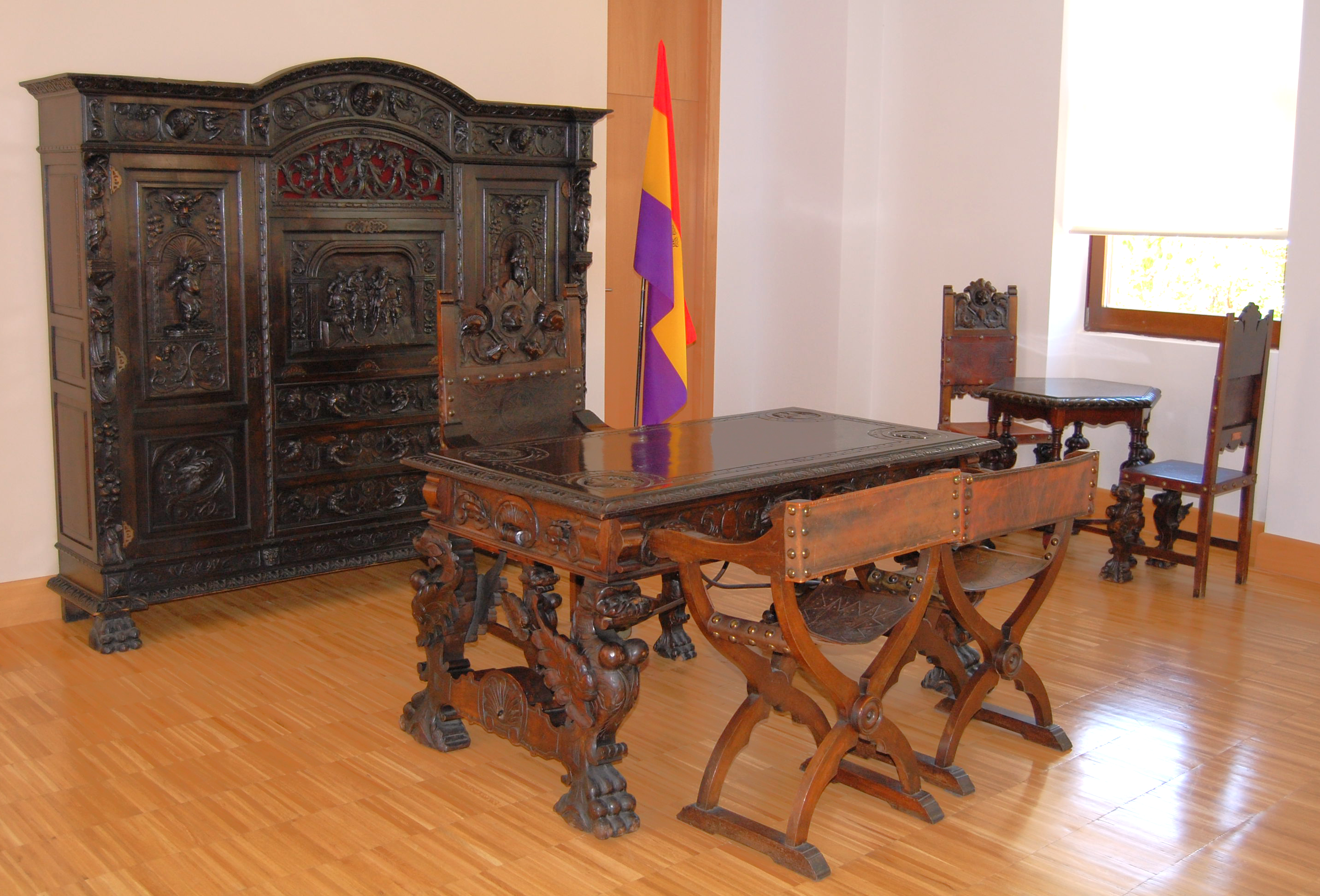
Francisco Largo Caballero's office, kept in the Archives of the Labor Movement in Alcalá de Henares.

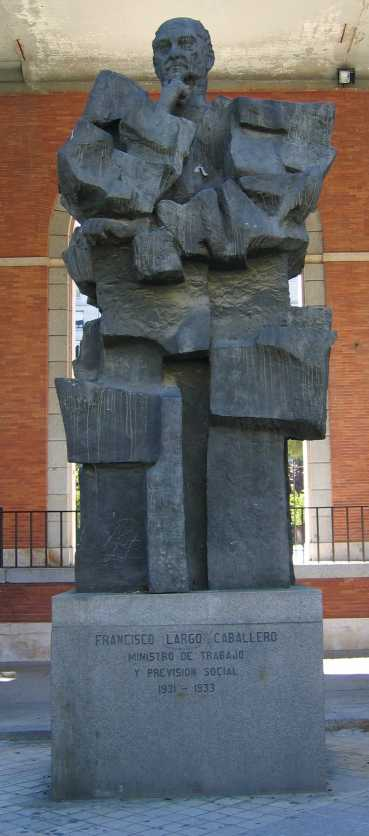
Monument of Largo Caballero

A few months into the civil war, after the Republican Left Party government of José Giral resigned on 4 September 1936, President Manuel Azaña asked Largo Caballero to form a new government. This resulted in the creation of a broader-based Popular Front cabinet. Largo Cabellero served as prime minister and also took the post of minister of war. Besides conducting the war, he also focused on maintaining military discipline and government authority within the Republic. On 4 November 1936 Largo Caballero persuaded the anarchist Confederación Nacional del Trabajo (CNT; "National Confederation of Labour") to join the government, with four members assigned to junior ministries including Justice, Health and Trade. The decision was controversial with the CNT members.

Throughout his tenure in office the once-radicalised Largo Caballero became more and more disenchanted with his earlier flirtations with the radical left and communists during the Black Biennium. When diplomatic recognition was established with the USSR in 1936, the exchange of ambassadors left Largo Caballero with Soviet ambassador Marcel Rosenberg, who according to Caballerist PSOE member Luis Araquistáin in his memoirs, “acted like a Russian viceroy in Spain.” On one occasion PSOE member Gines Ganga wrote of an incident witnessed by numerous people where Largo Caballero, showing Rosenberg and Communist-sympathetic foreign minister Julio Álvarez del Vayo the door at a heated meeting, yelled:

Get out! Get out! You must learn, Señor Ambassador, that Spaniards may be poor and need help from abroad, but we are sufficiently proud not to accept that a foreign ambassador should try to impose his will on the head of the Spanish government.

Largo Caballero also found himself under attack from the Communists when he was forced to accept the removal, to appease them, of his favourite José Asencio Torrado from the post of undersecretary of war after the military failure of February 1937 of the fall of Málaga, according to Burnett Bolloten. He further antagonised the Communists when he attempted to revoke from del Vayo, who was also Comissariat General of the People's Army, the right of naming political commissars.

The Barcelona May Days of 3 to 8 May 1937 led to a governmental crisis that forced Largo Caballero to resign on 17 May 1937. His attempted defence of the POUM, one of the parties involved in the May Days, led to the opposition of various moderate pro-centralisation PSOE ministers like Indalecio Prieto and Jose Giral, as well as the Communists, who seized the opportunity to walk out with their colleagues on Largo Caballero, therefore crippling his government. Juan Negrín, also a member of the PSOE, was appointed prime minister in his stead.

For the rest of the war Caballero was out of office, writing to express his opinions in his publication La Claridad. He openly sided with Prime Minister Juan Negrín and Prieto against Communist hegemony in the army and security forces.

Largo Cabellero's cabinet, formed on 4 September 1936 and reshuffled on 4 November 1936, consisted of:

Ministry	Start	End	Officeholder	Party
Prime Minister and War	4 September 1936	17 May 1937	Francisco Largo Caballero	PSOE (left)
State (Foreign Affairs)	4 September 1936	17 May 1937	Julio Álvarez del Vayo	PSOE (left)
Finance	4 September 1936	17 May 1937	Juan Negrín López	PSOE (moderate)
Interior	4 September 1936	17 May 1937	Ángel Galarza	PSOE (left)
Industry and Commerce	4 September 1936	4 November 1936	Anastasio de Gracia Villarrubia	PSOE (moderate)
Industry	4 November 1936	17 May 1937	Juan Peiró Belis	CNT
Commerce	4 November 1936	17 May 1937	Juan López Sánchez	CNT
Navy and Air	4 September 1936	17 May 1937	Indalecio Prieto Tuero	PSOE (moderate)
Education and Fine Arts	4 September 1936	17 May 1937	Jesús Hernández Tomás	PCE
Agriculture	4 September 1936	17 May 1937	Vicente Uribe Galdeano	PCE
Justice	4 September 1936	4 November 1936	Mariano Ruiz-Funes García	IR
Justice	4 November 1936	17 May 1937	Juan García Oliver	CNT
Communications and Merchant Marine	4 September 1936	17 May 1937	Bernardo Giner de los Ríos	UR
Labor and Health	4 September 1936	4 November 1936	José Tomás y Piera	ERC
Labor and Planning	4 November 1936	15 May 1937	Anastasio de Gracia Villarrubia	PSOE (moderate)
Health and Social Assistance	4 November 1936	17 May 1937	Federica Montseny Mañé	CNT
Public Works	4 September 1936	15 September 1936	Vicente Uribe Galdeano (Interim)	PCE
Public Works	15 September 1936	17 May 1937	Julio Just Gimeno	IR
Propaganda	4 November 1936	17 May 1937	Carlos Esplá Rizo	IR
Without portfolio	4 September 1936	15 May 1937	José Giral Pereira	IR
Without portfolio	4 September 1936	15 May 1937	Manuel Irujo y Ollo	PNV
Without portfolio	4 November 1936	17 May 1936	Jaime Ayguadé Miró	ERC

=== Exile and death ===
Upon the defeat of the Republic in 1939, he fled to France. Arrested during the German occupation of France, he was imprisoned in the Sachsenhausen-Oranienburg concentration camp from 1943-1945, with the liberation of the camps at the end of the war.

He died in exile in Paris in 1946; his remains were returned to Madrid in 1978 after Franco's death in 1975.

== Legacy ==
The Francisco Largo Caballero Foundation, a historical organization founded in 1978 by the UGT, is named in his honour.

On 14 October 2024, a memorial stone was dedicated to Largo Caballero in the Memorial Forest of the Sachsenhausen Memorial and Museum, followed by an event about the politics of remembrance in Germany and Spain.

== See also ==
- Moscow gold
- Marcelino Valentín Gamazo

== Sources ==
- Beevor, Antony (2006). The Battle for Spain: The Spanish Civil War, 1936–1939. London: Penguin Books. ISBN 0-14-303765-X.
- Carr, Raymond (1980). Modern Spain 1875-1980. Oxford, UK: Oxford University Press. ISBN 0-19-215828-7.Graham, Helen (2005). The Spanish Civil War. A Very Short Introduction. Oxford University Press. ISBN 978-0-19-280377-1.
- Jackson, Gabriel (1967). The Spanish Republic and the Civil War, 1931–1939. Princeton: Princeton University Press. ISBN 0-691-00757-8.
- Paz, Abel (2011). The Story of the Iron Column: Militant Anarchism in the Spanish Civil War. AK Press. ISBN 978-1-84935-064-8.
- Preston, Paul (2006). The Spanish Civil War. Reaction, revolution & revenge. London: Harper Perennial. ISBN 978-0-00-723207-9.
- Thomas, Hugh (2003). The Spanish Civil War. London: Penguin Books. ISBN 978-0-14-101161-5.
- Urquijo y Goitia, José Ramón de (2008). Gobiernos y ministros españoles en la edad contemporánea. Editorial CSIC - CSIC Press. ISBN 978-84-00-08737-1.

Political offices
Preceded by Gabriel Maura Gamazo	Minister of Labour and Social Security; 1931–1933	Succeeded by Carles Pi i Sunyer
Preceded by José Giral	Prime Minister of Spain; 1936–1937	Succeeded by Juan Negrín
Preceded by Juan Hernández Saravia	Minister of War; 1936–1937	Succeeded by Indalecio Prieto
Party political offices
Preceded by Remigio Cabello	President of the Spanish Socialist Workers' Party; 1932–1936	Succeeded by Ramón González Peña
Preceded by Remigio Cabello	Leader of the Socialist Group in the Congress of Deputies; 1933–1936	Succeeded by Ramón González Peña
Trade union offices
Preceded by Vicente Barrio	Secretary General of the UGT; 1918–1938	Succeeded by José Rodríguez Vega
