= Santiago Carrillo =

Spanish politician (1915–2012)

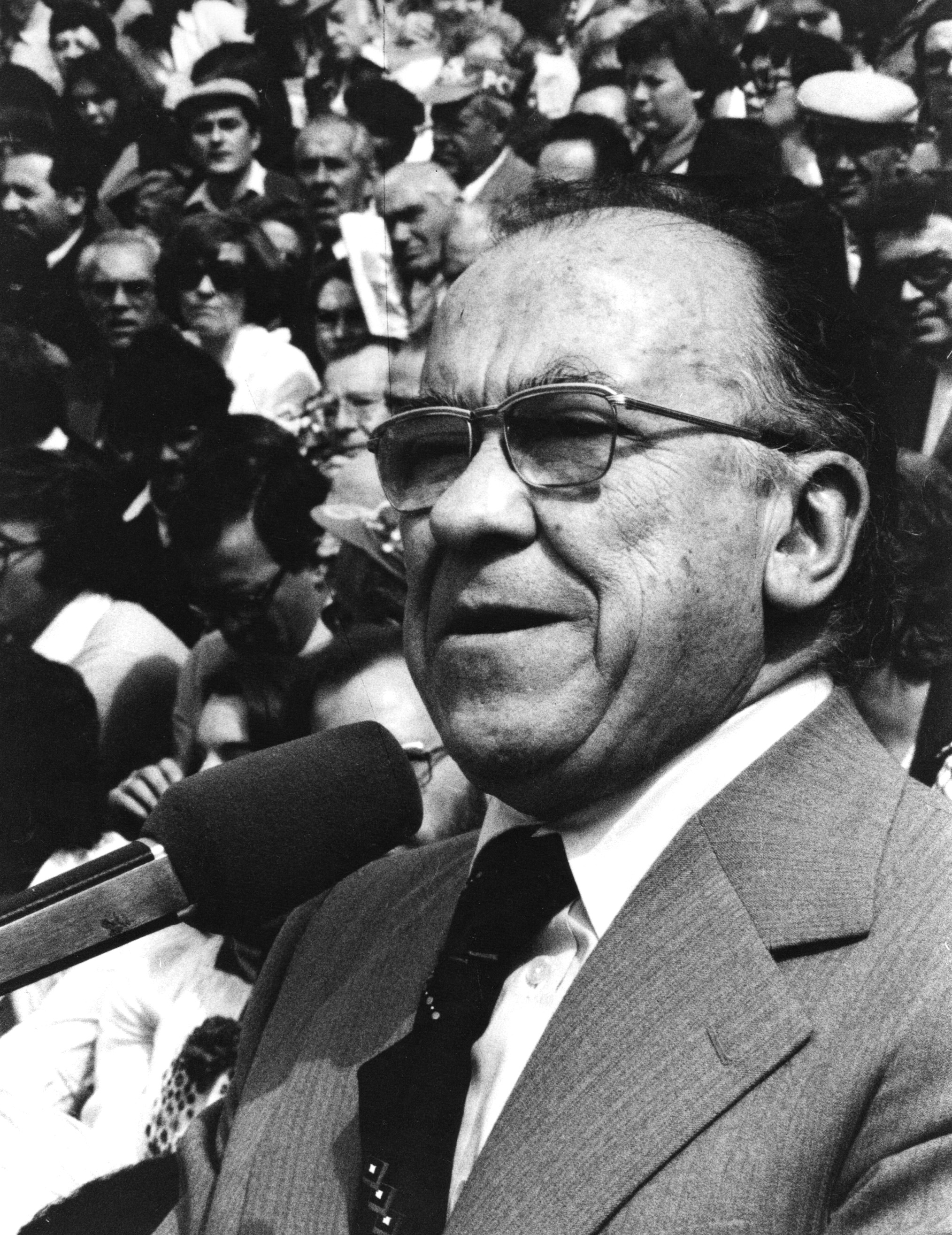

Secretary-General of the Communist Party of Spain
- In office 3 July 1960 – 10 December 1982
- Preceded by: Dolores Ibárruri
- Succeeded by: Gerardo Iglesias

Councillor of Public Order of the Madrid Defense Council
- In office 6 November 1936 – 27 December 1936
- President: José Miaja
- Preceded by: Position established
- Succeeded by: José Cazorla

Secretary-General of the Unified Socialist Youth
- In office 15 June 1936 – 20 June 1947

Secretary-General of the Socialist Youth of Spain
- In office 10 May 1934 – 15 June 1936

Member of the Congress of Deputies
- In office 13 July 1977 – 23 April 1986
- Constituency: Madrid

Personal details
- Born: Santiago José Carrillo Solares; 18 January 1915 Gijón, Asturias, Spain
- Died: 18 September 2012 (aged 97) Madrid, Spain
- Party: PCE (1936–1985); PTE–UC (1985–1991)
- Spouse(s): Asunción Sánchez de Tudela (1936); Carmen Menéndez Menéndez (1949)
- Children: Aurora, Santiago, José, Jorge

Santiago José Carrillo Solares (18 January 1915 – 18 September 2012) was a Spanish politician who served as General Secretary of the Communist Party of Spain (PCE) from 1960 to 1982.

He was exiled during the dictatorship of Francisco Franco, becoming a leader of the democratic opposition to the regime. His role as leader of the PCE made him a key figure in the transition to democracy. He later embraced Eurocommunism and democratic socialism, and was a member of the Congress of Deputies from 1977 to 1986.

== Childhood and early youth ==
Born in Gijón, Asturias province, Santiago Carrillo was the son of Socialist leader Wenceslao Carrillo and María Rosalía Solares Martínez. When he was six years old, his family moved to Madrid. After attending school, he began to work in El Socialista, the Spanish Socialist Workers' Party (PSOE) newspaper at the age of 13. At the same time, he joined the Socialist Union, the Workers' General Union and the Socialist Youth.

== Second Republic and Civil War ==
In 1932, Carrillo joined the Executive Commission of the Socialist Youth and became editor of its newspaper, Renovación. Carrillo belonged to the left wing of the organisation. In 1933, as the Socialist Youth was becoming more radical, Carrillo was elected as General Secretary. From October 1934 to February 1936 he was jailed, due to his participation in the failed 1934 leftist coup (Carrillo was a member of the National Revolutionary Committee).

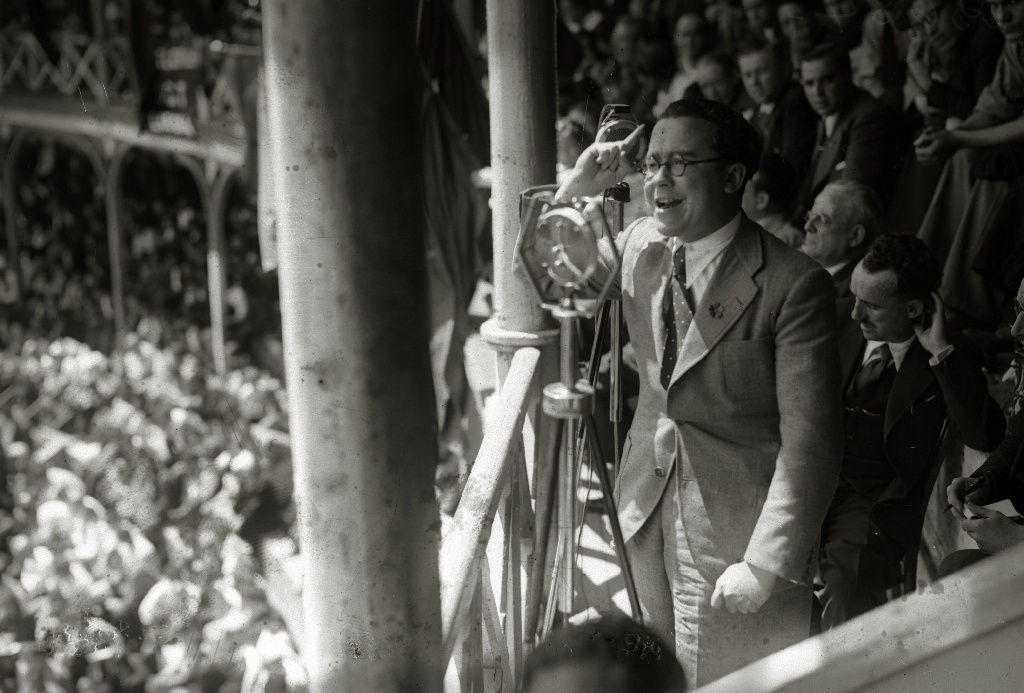
Delivering a speech in Tolosa in 1936

After his release, in March 1936, Carrillo and the executive of the Socialist Youth travelled to Moscow to meet the leaders of the Young Communist International and prepare the unification of Socialist and Communist youth leagues. He was accompanied on the visit to Moscow by Leandro Carro and Juan Astigarrabía. The result was the creation of the Unified Socialist Youth (Juventudes Socialistas Unificadas).

After the outbreak of the Spanish Civil War, Carrillo joined the Communist Party and did so on the day the government left Madrid in November. During the war, he was intensely pro-Soviet. On 7 November 1936 Carrillo was elected Councillor for Public Order in the Defence Council of Madrid, which was given supreme power in besieged Madrid, after the government left the city.

During his term, several thousand military and civilian prisoners were killed by republican groups in the Paracuellos massacres at Paracuellos del Jarama and Torrejón de Ardoz (the biggest mass killings by the Republican side during the Civil War). The dead were buried in common graves. Carrillo denied any knowledge of the massacres in his memoirs but some historians like César Vidal and Pío Moa maintain that Carrillo was involved. In an interview with the historian Ian Gibson, Carrillo set out his version of events concerning the massacre. In the preface of the second edition of his book, Ian Gibson maintains that Cesar Vidal twisted and misrepresented his sources in order to indict Carrillo. Fernando Hernández, José Luis Ledesma, Paul Preston and Ángel Viñas argued that Carillo can't claim ignorance of knowing the fate of the prisoners because he was present at the few meetings where the sacas (taking out of prisoners) were discussed and received oral instructions. Although they say Pedro Checa and NKVD agents are primarily responsible. Julius Ruiz echoed similar sentiments and also argued that Carillo provided logistical and political support for the killings.

In March 1939 Madrid surrendered after Casado's coup against the Negrín administration and its close ally, the Communist Party, which sought to continue the resistance until the expected outbreak of the World War. Carrillo's father, Wenceslao, a member of the PSOE, was among those who led the coup and was a member of Casado's Junta. Some weeks before, Carrillo's mother had died. Carrillo then wrote an open letter to his father describing the coup as counter-revolutionary and as a betrayal, reproaching him for his anti-communism, and renouncing any further communication with him. In his memoirs, Carrillo states that the letter was written on 7 March. However, journalist and historian Carlos Fernández published the letter in 1983, as it had been published in Correspondance International; it was dated 15 May.

After the military collapse of the Republican Government, Carrillo fled to Paris and worked to reorganise the party. Carrillo spent 38 years in exile, most of the time in France, but also in the USSR and other countries.

== Exile ==
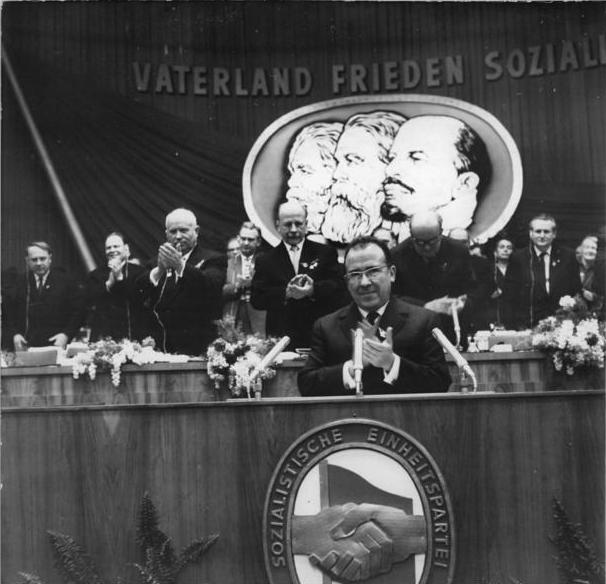
Santiago Carrillo speaking to the VI Congress of the Socialist Unity Party of Germany in 1963.

In 1944 Carrillo led the retreat of the communist guerrillas from the Aran Valley.

According to the historian and politician Ricardo de la Cierva, in 1945 Carrillo ordered the execution of fellow communist party member Gabriel León Trilla In 2005 Carrillo said "yo he tenido que eliminar a alguna persona" (I have had to eliminate someone).

Between April 1946 and January 1947, he served as minister without portfolio in the Republican government-in-exile led by José Giral.

In August 1948, Carrillo met Soviet leader Joseph Stalin.

Carrillo became the General Secretary of the PCE in 1960, replacing Dolores Ibárruri (La Pasionaria), who was given the honorary post of Party Chairman. Carrillo's policies were aimed at strengthening the party's position among the working class and intellectual groups, and survived opposition from Marxist–Leninist, Stalinist and social democratic factions. In 1968, when the Soviets and Warsaw Pact countries invaded Czechoslovakia, Carrillo distanced the party from Moscow.

He fought for the total independence of the party from the Soviet Union and for a peaceful return to democracy in Spain.

== Spanish transition and Eurocommunism ==
Carrillo returned secretly to Spain in 1976 after the death of long-time Spanish caudillo Francisco Franco. He disguised his bald head with a wig provided by Eugenio Arias, Picasso's barber. He was entered from France in the Mercedes of millionaire communist sympathizer Teodulfo Lagunero. Arrested by the police, he was released within days. Together with communist party leaders Georges Marchais of France and Enrico Berlinguer of Italy, he launched the Eurocommunist movement in a meeting held in Madrid on 2 March 1977.

In the first democratic elections in 1977, shortly after the legalization of the PCE (9 April 1977) by the government of Adolfo Suárez, Carrillo was elected to the Spanish Congress of Deputies (Congreso de los Diputados), the lower house of the Spanish Parliament, the Cortes Generales to represent the Madrid district. Throughout the transition period, Carrillo's authority and leadership were decisive in securing peaceful evolution towards a democratic system, a constructive approach based on dialogue with opponents, and a healing of the wounds from the Civil War (the "Reconciliation" policy). It is widely acknowledged that this policy played a key role in making possible a peaceful transition to democracy.

Carrillo was re-elected in 1979, but the failed right-wing coup d'état attempt on 23 February 1981 reduced support for the PCE, as Spanish society was still recovering from the trauma of the Civil War and subsequent repression and dictatorship. This was despite Carrillo's celebrated and highly public defiance of the coup plotters in the chamber of deputies - he was one of the three members who refused to obey by laying on the ground, even when they shot into the air.

Fear of another military uprising increased support for moderate left-wing forces in the 1982 elections, in which Carrillo held his parliamentary seat. He was forced to leave his post as party leader on 6 November 1982, owing to the party's poor electoral performance.

== Leaving the Spanish Communist Party ==
On 15 April 1985, Carrillo and his followers were expelled from the PCE, and in 1986 they formed their own political group, the Workers Party of Spain-Communist Unity (PTE-UC). This tiny party was unable to attract enough voters, so on 27 October 1991, Carrillo announced that it would be disbanded. Subsequently, the PTE-UC merged into the ruling PSOE, but Carrillo declined PSOE membership considering his many years as a communist member.

== Retirement and death ==
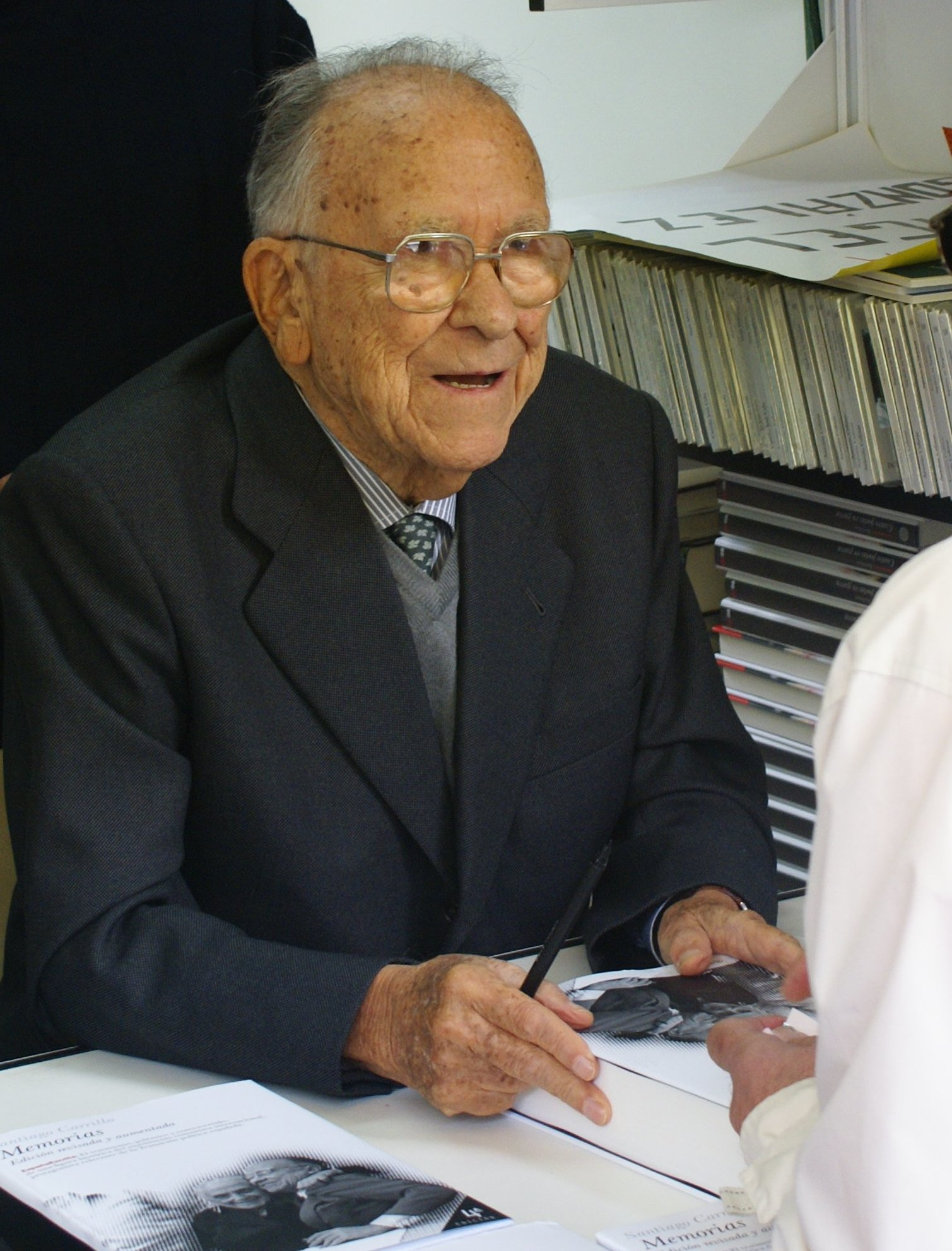
Carillo in 2006

On 20 October 2005, Carrillo was granted an honorary doctorate by the Autonomous University of Madrid. The action of the university was strongly criticized by right-wing commentators. Carrillo had retired from public life at the time of his death at his home in Madrid at the age of 97 on 18 September 2012. He was cremated in Madrid on 20 September.

== List of works ==
- "¿Adónde va el Partido Socialista? (Prieto contra los socialistas del interior)" (1959)
- "Después de Franco, ¿qué?" (1965)
- "Problems of Socialism Today" (1970)
- "Demain l’Espagne" (1974); English edition: Dialogue on Spain, Lawrence & Wishart, 1976
- "Eurocomunismo y Estado" Editorial Critica (1977) ISBN 84-7423-015-2; English edition: Eurocommunism and the State, Lawrence and Wishart, 1977, ISBN 0-85315-408-2
- "El año de la Constitución" (1978)
- "Memoria de la transición: la vida política española y el PCE" (1983)
- "Problemas de la transición: las condiciones de la revolución socialista" (1985)
- "El año de la peluca" (1987)
- "Problemas del Partido: el centralismo democrático" (1988)
- "Memorias" (1993)
- "La gran transición: ¿cómo reconstruir la izquierda?" (1995)
- "Un joven del 36" (1996)
- "Juez y parte: 15 retratos españoles" (1998)
- "La Segunda República: recuerdos y reflexiones" (1999)
- "¿Ha muerto el comunismo?: ayer y hoy de un movimiento clave para entender la convulsa historia del siglo XX" (2000)
- "La memoria en retazos: recuerdos de nuestra historia más reciente" (2004)
- "¿Se vive mejor en la república?" (2005)
- "Dolores Ibárruri: Pasionaria, una fuerza de la naturaleza" (2008)
- "La crispación en España. De la Guerra Civil a nuestros días" (2008)
- "Los viejos camaradas" (2010)
- "La difícil reconciliación de los españoles" (2011)
- "Nadando a contracorriente" (2012)
- "La lucha continúa" (2012)

== See also ==
- Jorge Semprún
- History of Spain
- Politics of Spain

Preceded by Dolores Ibárruri	General Secretary of the Communist Party of Spain; 1960-1982	Succeeded by Gerardo Iglesias
