= Unified Socialist Youth =

Former Spanish youth organization

Unified Socialist Youth Juventudes Socialistas Unificadas
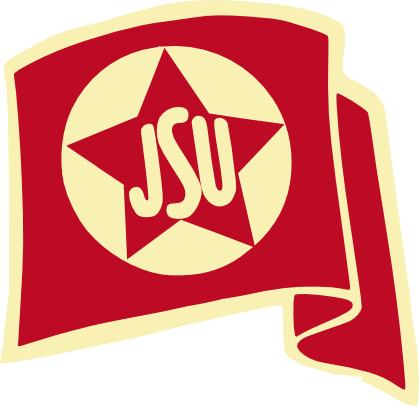
- Abbreviation: JSU
- Leader: Santiago Carrillo
- Founded: 1936
- Dissolved: 1961
- Merger of: UJCE and JSE
- Ideology: Marxism–Leninism; Revolutionary socialism
- International affiliation: Socialist Youth International

Party flag

JSU poster

The Unified Socialist Youth (Spanish: Juventudes Socialistas Unificadas; JSU) was a youth organization formed in the spring of 1936 in Spain through the amalgamation of the Spanish Socialist Workers' Party (PSOE) and Communist Party of Spain (PCE) youth groups. Its leader, Santiago Carrillo, came from the socialist youth, but had secretly joined the communist youth prior to the merger, and the group was soon dominated by the PCE.

== See also ==
- Antifascist Worker and Peasant Militias
