= José Miaja =

Spanish Republican Army general

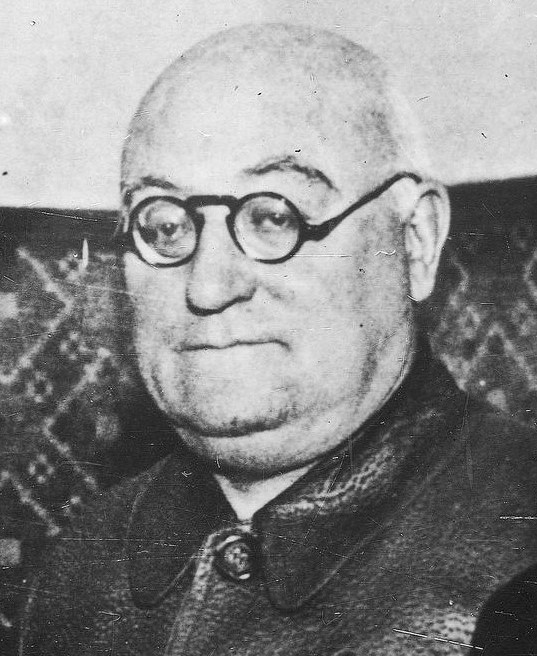
- General Miaja in 1938

President of the National Defense Council
- In office 5 March 1939 – 28 March 1939

President of the Madrid Defense Council
- In office 6 November 1936 – 23 April 1937

Minister of War of Spain
- In office 18 July – 19 July 1936
- President: Manuel Azaña
- Prime Minister: Diego Martínez Barrio
- Preceded by: Santiago Casares Quiroga
- Succeeded by: Luis Castelló Pantoja

Personal details
- Born: 20 April 1878 Oviedo, Asturias, Spain
- Died: 14 January 1958 (aged 79) Mexico City, Mexico
- Awards: Order of Saint Hermenegild; Laureate Plate of Madrid

Military service
- Allegiance: Kingdom of Spain (1898–1931); Spanish Republic (1931–1939)
- Branch/service: Spanish Army; Spanish Republican Army
- Years of service: 1898–1939
- Rank: Lieutenant General
- Battles/wars: Rif War; Spanish Civil War; Siege of Madrid; Battle of Jarama; Battle of Brunete; Battle of Guadalajara

José Miaja Menant (20 April 1878 – 14 January 1958) was a General of the Second Spanish Republic.

== Early life ==
He entered the Infantry Academy at Toledo in 1896. His first post was in Asturias. Miaja was later transferred to Melilla where he served in the Moroccan War of 1900, achieving the rank of major comandante in 1911, and rising to General in 1932. Despite Miaja's membership of the right-wing Unión Militar Española, in 1935 conservative minister of War, José María Gil-Robles y Quiñones, sent him to Lleida, Catalonia, a relatively obscure posting far from the capital, an indication that he did not have the full confidence of the government.

== Spanish Civil War ==
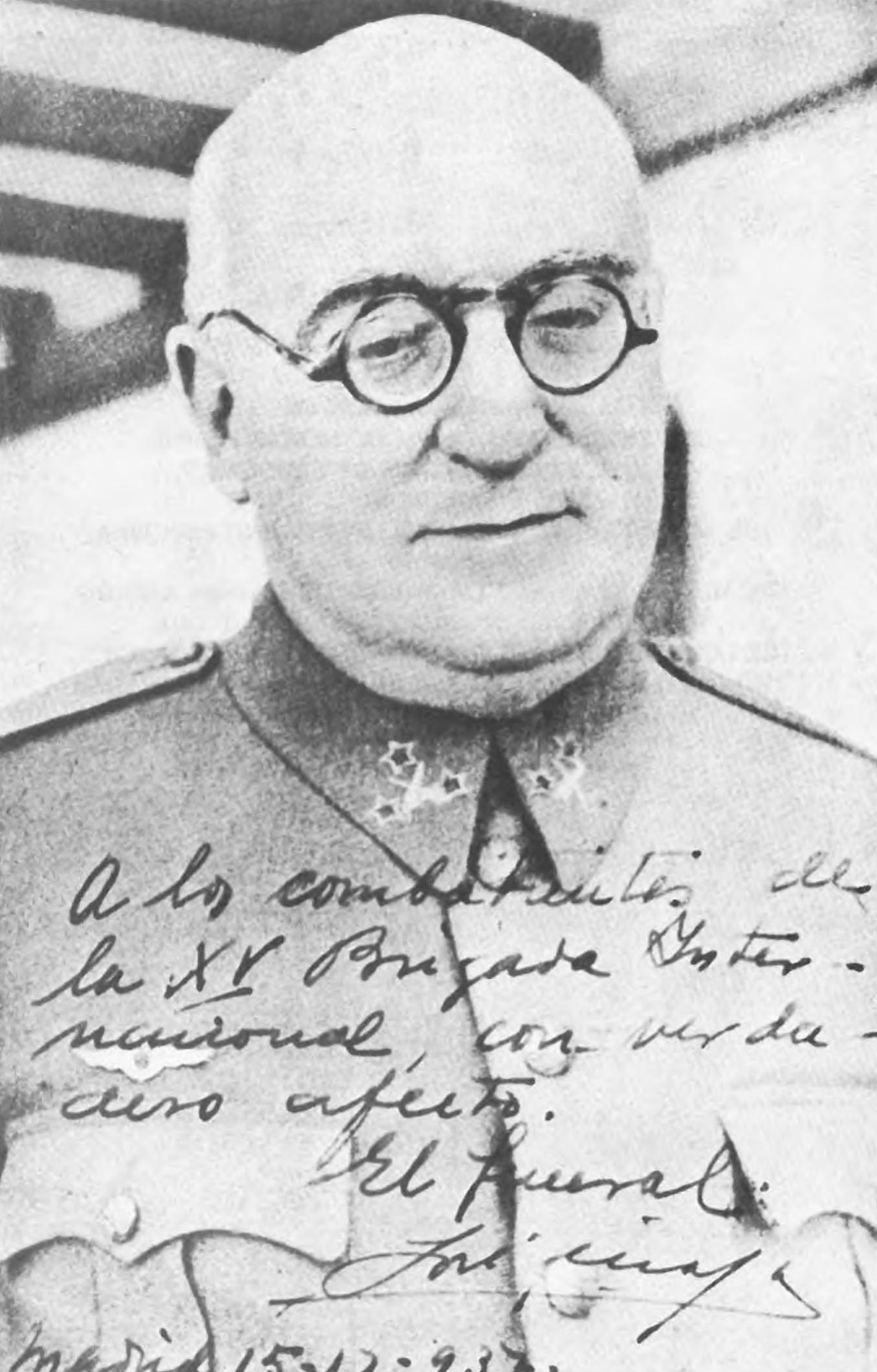
A signed photo of Miaja, addressed to the XV International Brigade, published 1938

At the start of the military rebellion that led to the Spanish Civil War, he was stationed in Madrid, remaining loyal to the Republican government, and was appointed Minister of War. In November 1936, he was named commander of the Junta de Defensa de Madrid (Madrid Defense Council), when the government evacuated the capital before the imminent arrival of fascist troops. With Vicente Rojo Lluch as chief-of-staff, he managed to halt the Nationalists at the river Manzanares at the Battle of Madrid.

As a Spanish Republican Army commander of the Central Zone, he directed the battles of the Jarama, Guadalajara and Brunete. He later supported the rebellion led by Segismundo Casado against the government of prime minister Juan Negrín in March 1939, serving as President of the National Defence Council (Consejo Nacional de Defensa). He was awarded the Laureate Plate of Madrid for his role during the Siege of Madrid.

== Exile ==
After the end of the Civil War, he went to Gandia, where he boarded a plane to Oran that took him into exile, first to French Algeria and France, then to Mexico, where he died on 14 January 1958.

== Bibliography ==
- Alpert, Michael; El Ejército Republicano en la Guerra Civil, Siglo XXI de España, Madrid, 1989 ISBN 978-84-323-0682-2
- Beevor, Antony (2006). The Battle for Spain: The Spanish Civil War, 1936–1939. Penguin Books. pp. 526. ISBN 978-0143037651.
- Carlos Engel, Historia de las Brigadas Mixtas del Ejército Popular de la República, Ed. Almena. Madrid 1999, ISBN 84-922644-7-0
- Ramón Salas Larrazábal, Historia del Ejército Popular de la República. La Esfera de los Libros S.L. ISBN 84-9734-465-0
- Suero Roca, M. Teresa; Militares republicanos de la Guerra de España. Ediciones Península Ibérica, Barcelona, 1981. ISBN 84-297-1706-4
- Thomas, Hugh. The Spanish Civil War. Penguin Books. 2001. London
