= Women in the Communist Party of Spain =

Women in the Communist Party of Spain were highly active, the most visible figure in the movement being Dolores Ibárruri, who joined in its early years. The Dictatorship of Primo de Rivera pushed the group underground, where they had to meet clandestinely around their public face, the football club Oriente FC.

The birth of the Second Republic in 1931 saw a new era in Spain, where women were welcomed en masse into the public sphere, receiving voting rights, the ability to divorce and increased access to education. The first elections in 1931 saw the PCE kept out of Congress, though communist sympathizer Margarita Nelken y Mansbergen did win a seat representing the PSOE. She went on to win re-election in 1933, and PCE won a single seat in Congress.

In 1935 PCE embraced the Popular Front line, seeking to unite all anti-fascist forces under a single umbrella. Dolores Ibárruri's prominence grew in this period, as she increasingly became the face of the party, winning a seat in the 1936 elections. PCE's strategy towards women in the Second Republic was largely to address their needs primarily as a tool to grow membership. The 1934 Asturian Miners' Strike saw women's profile grow larger. With women's parallel participation in violence, the male PCE leadership tried to discourage women from the more militant aspects of the party.

During the Spanish Civil War, Spanish and international communist women served on the front lines and on the home front, rising to leadership positions within militia forces. However, male communist leaders tended want them away from the front lines and tried to make clear internationally that female combatants should not come to Spain. Behind Nationalist lines, Communist affiliated women were executed or sent to prison. They were also raped, forced to drink castor oil, had their heads shaved and forced to march through towns as punishment.

The post Civil War period of Francoist Spain saw many Communist women go into exile, while early in this period the PCE maintained its status as the most important leftist political organization. Women were involved behind the scenes, organizing covert armed resistance, bombing Guardia Civil positions, robbing banks and attacking offices of Falanage.

== Prelude to the Second Republic (1800–1922) ==
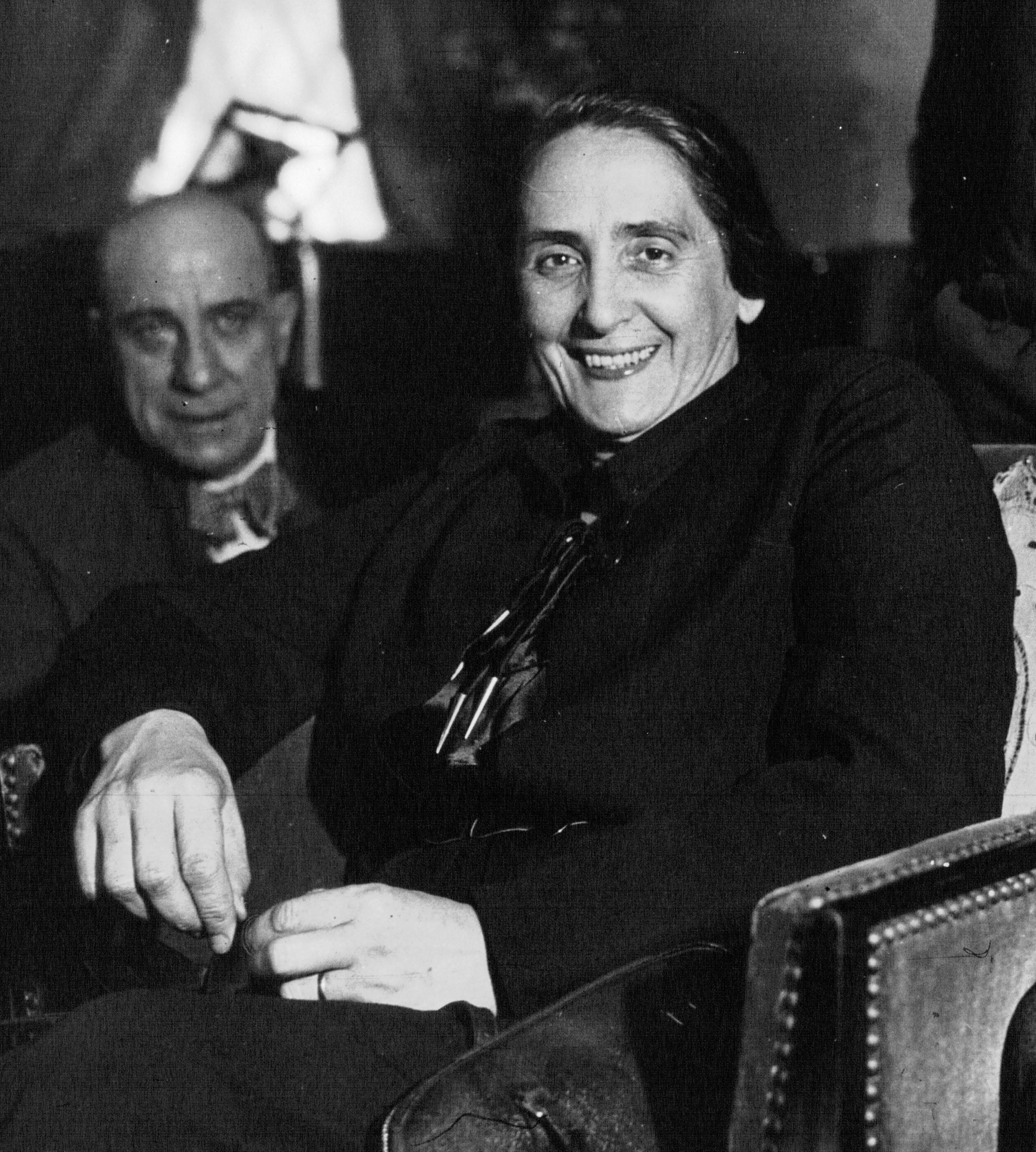
Spanish political leader Dolores Ibárruri in 1936.

Following the Bolshevik Revolution in Russia, members of Partido Socialista Obrero Español (PSOE) began to discuss what the role of communism should be in their own party, with the topic raised in PSOE's 1919 Congress. The following year, the youth wing of the party created the Communist Party of Spain (Spanish: Partido Comunista de España) (PCE) but they not recognized as a PSOE affiliate. Partido Comunista Obrero Español were founded in 1921 by Bolshevik sympathizers within PSOE, but they too were rejected by PSOE.

Dolores Ibárruri was one of the few women active in leadership in the Communist Party of Spain. Joining during the 1920s, she found herself elected to the Central Committee by 1930. Two years later, she was the head of its Women's Commission.

Secretaries-General of the Communist Party of Spain
Year	Name	Time in office
1921	Antonio García Quejido	1921–1923
1923	César Rodríguez González	1923–1925
1925	José Bullejos	1925–1932
1932	José Díaz	1932–1942
1942	Dolores Ibárruri	1942–1960

== Dictatorship of Primo de Rivera (1923–1930) ==
The Dictatorship of Primo de Rivera forced PCE to go underground, and engage in clandestine activities with their public face being Oriente FC, a football club. Because the organization was in hiding, they lacked a cohesive, shareable platform in this period and the organization was beset by internal conflicts. The most radical elements in the party congregated in Juventud Comunista, also representing the most organized branch of the party.

== Second Spanish Republic (1931–1937) ==
One of the most important things about the Second Republic for women is it allowed them to formally enter the public sphere en masse. The period also saw a number of rights available to women for the first time. This included the right to vote, divorce and access to higher education.

=== Elections in the Second Republic ===
The Spanish monarchy ended in 1931. Following this and the end of the Dictatorship of Primo de Rivera, the Second Republic was formed. The Second Republic had three elections before being replaced by the Franco dictatorship. These elections were held in 1931, 1933 and 1936.

Election	Popular vote			Seats	Leader	Outcome
Election	Votes	%	#	Seats	Leader	Outcome
1931		0.8	#21	0 / 470	José Bullejos	DLR–PSOE–PRR–PRS–AR–FRG–PCR coalition
1933		1.9	#14	1 / 472	José Díaz Ramos	PRR–PA–GRI–PRLD–PRG coalition
1936		2.5	#13	17 / 473	José Díaz Ramos	IR–UR coalition

==== June 1931 Elections ====
PCE was on the margins of Spanish politics until 1931, when the Second Republic was founded. Its membership prior to that was only in the low thousands. Its small size made it of little interest to the broader Communist movement in Europe.

Three women would win seats in Spain's national congress, the Cortes in the 1931 elections, Spain's Cortes were Clara Campoamor Rodríguez, Victoria Kent Siano and Margarita Nelken y Mansbergen. Nelken, who officially joined the party in 1935, ran in the 1931 elections as a PSOE affiliated candidate.

==== 1933 Elections ====
For the first time, for the 1933 elections, women could vote in the national elections.

Socialist feminist and communist supporter Margarita Nelken y Mansbergen faced problems in the Cortes. Her mother was French and her father was a German Jew. As a consequence, before she was allowed to sit in 1931, Nelken had to go through special bureaucratic procedures to insure she was a naturalized Spanish citizen. Her political interests were looked down upon by her male peers, including Prime Minister Manuel Azaña. Her feminist beliefs worried and threatened her male colleagues in the Cortes. Despite this, she was reelected in 1933, and found herself subject to constant attacks in the media as she proved a constant irritant to male party members who sometimes resorted to racist attacks in the Cortes to shut her down. Still, she persevered, winning election 1931, 1933 and 1936. Disillusionment with PSOE led her to change membership to the Communist Party in 1937.

==== February 1936 elections ====
By 1935 Dolores Ibárruri, who had attended the International Lenin School in Moscow, had risen to a leading role in the party. PCE, through Unified Socialist Youth (Spanish: Juventud Socialista Unificada) (JSU) and Unified Socialist Party of Catalonia (Catalan: Partit Socialista Unificat de Catalunya) (PSUC), waged a campaign to try to bring all the leftist parties under their own umbrella. This angered PSOE, trade unions, anarchists and other socialists. Consequently, the idea was abandoned and PCE instead worked on creating joint committees for collective action with these other organizations. Dolores Ibárruri rose to prominence as the leader of PCE in a large part because she was the only member of PCE who had the charisma and public visibility to appeal to the broader mass of Spanish leftists. One of the methods that PCE used to try to gain more power in 1935 was to align with Republican parties ahead of the 1936 elections. This was viewed as a method of being able to further control inside the Republic, and co-opt the leftist movements. Prior to this, they had rejected such alliances as too bourgeois.

Ibárruri campaigned for a deputy in the Cortes ahead of the 1936 elections as a member of the Popular Front. During her campaign in Asturias, she campaigned before groups of Socialists, Communists, Anti-fascists and Republicans. She used her experiences to improve her oratory skills that would serve her later during the Civil War by observing other speakers who managed to successfully engage audiences. Ibárruri won, and entered the Cortes as a member of the Popular Front, in the Communist minority. Unlike some of their peers on the left, she and other Communists advocated citizens taking up arms in preparation for what they saw as the coming conflict. During important debates about women in the Second Republic, Dolores Ibárruri was often silent. She was not involved in the debate about women's suffrage and she condemned abortion. The women's rights issues she spoke about included the right to work outside the home, pay parity, and the need for childcare.

Nelken returned from exile to run for election. Nelken, also a militant communist and feminist, was much less accepted than Dolores Ibárruri precisely because she did not challenge the patriarchy of the day. Consequently, Ibárruri's leadership is remembered more fondly in Spain than Nelken's.

=== Political activity ===
One of the biggest challenges faced by leftist women was Marxism prioritized the issue of class equality over gender issues. For anarchists, syndicalists, communist and socialist women, this often resulted in male leadership deprioritizing women's needs and locking women out of participation and governance as their needs did not directly relate to the class struggle. Some leftist men, both in political and labor organizations, also resented women entering the workforce, viewing their lower wages as contributing to employers lowering wages among male workers.

Despite their own differences in ideology, communist, Republican, communist and socialist women would come together for discussions about the political issues of the day. They also worked to mobilize women en masse to protest issues they felt were important. One such mobilization occurred in 1934, when the Republican government considered mobilizing its reserve forces military action in Morocco. Within hours of the news hitting the streets, Communist, Republican and Socialist women had organized a women's march to protest the proposed action in Madrid. Many women were arrested, taken to the police headquarters and later released.

=== Party politics ===
During the Second Republic, Partido Comunista de España was the primary Communist political organization in Spain. Communists began to recognize the importance of women during the Second Republic, and started to actively seek female members to broader their female based in 1932. To this further this goal, the first Communist women's organization, Committee of Women against War and Fascism in Spain, was created as a way of trying to attract women to Communist connected unions in 1933. Membership for women in PCE's Asturias section in 1932 was 330, but it grew By 1937, it had increased to 1,800 women.

Women in Partido Comunista de España faced sexism on a regular basis, which prevent them from rising up the ranks in leadership. They were denied the ability to be fully indoctrinated by keeping them out of Communist ideological training classes. At the same time, men insisted women were not capable of leadership because they were not educated in these principals. The sexism these leftist women faced was similar to their counterparts on the right, who were locked out of activities of the Catholic Church for exactly the same reason.

During the Austrian miners action, the government of the Second Republic responded by arresting thousands of miners and closing down their workers centers. Women rose up to support striking and imprisoned miners by advocating for their release and taking jobs to support their families. PCE male leadership strove to find roles for women that better comported with what they saw as more acceptable for their gender and better fit into the new, more conservative legal framework being created by the Second Republic. This included changing the name of the Committee for Women against War and Fascism to Pro-Working Class Children Committee. PCE's goal and the actual result was to discourage women's active participation in labor protests.

VII Comintern Congress in 1935 in Moscow had two representatives from the PCE. They were Ibárruri and Jose Díaz. Antonio Sesé and Hilari Arlandis i Esparza attended as a representative of the Communist Party of Catalonia. Ibárruri's profile rose so much during the Second Republic, while being coupled with the outlawing of the Communist Party, that she was regularly hunted by the Spanish police. This made it difficult for her to travel, both internally and externally. Being too close to her would also prove deadly. Twenty-three year old Juanita Corzo, a member of Women Against War, would was given a death sentence in 1939 for aiding Ibárruri, which was later commuted to life in prison.

In the spring of 1935, Ibárruri sent her children into exile in the Soviet Union. Matilde Landa became a PCE militant during the Second Republic while in Madrid.

For the 1936 May Day celebrations, the Communist Party of Spain worked hard to convey a perception that they were one of the dominant political groups in the country by turning out party members in Madrid. They successfully organized hundred of Communist and Socialist women to participate in a march, where they chanted "Children yes, husbands no!" (Spanish: ¡Hijos sí, maridos no!) with their fists clenched in the air behind huge Lenin and Stalin banners.

==== Spanish Committee of Women against War and Fascism ====
The Spanish Committee of Women against War and Fascism was founded as a women's organization linked to PCE in 1933. They represented a middle class feminist movement. As a result of PCE male governance trying to remove women from more active roles in the Communist movement, its name was changed to Pro-Working Class Children Committee around 1934 following the Asturian miners strike.

Dolores Ibárruri, Carmen Loyola, Encarnación Fuyola, Irene Falcón, Elisa Uriz and María Martinez Sierra, part of a larger group representing Spain's communist, anarchist and socialist factions, attended the 1933 World Committee of Women against War and Fascism meeting in France.

==== Republican Union (UR) ====
Despite many divisions on the left, Communist and other women would often visit Republican Union (Spanish: Unión Republicana) (UR) centers, where they would interact with other leftist women and discuss the political situation of the day during the early period of the Second Republic. Participants included Dolores Ibárruri, Victoria Kent and Clara Campoamor. Many of these women were very knowledgeable about these topics, more so than many of their male peers. This cross party collaborative discussion was at times threatening to male leaders in parties like the Republican Union, who in 1934 put a stop to it by posting police officers at the entrances to keep non-party members out. As a consequence, many women left the Republican Union at this time.

=== October Revolution of 1934 ===
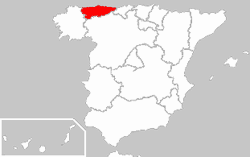
Location of Asturias, Spain.

Women played roles behind the scenes in one of the first major conflicts of the Second Republic, when workers' militias seized control of the mines in Asturias. Originally planned as a nationwide strike, the workers collective action only really took place in Asturias. Some women were involved in propaganda and others in assisting the miners. After the government quelled the insurrection by bringing in Moroccan legionaries, some 30,000 people found themselves in prison and another 1,000 were put into graves. A large number of those put into prison were women. Women also played an advocacy role in trying to see their husbands and male relatives released.

During the Austrian miners action, the government of the Second Republic responded by arresting thousands of miners and closing down their workers centers. Women rose up to support striking and imprisoned miners by advocating for their release and taking jobs to support their families. Following this, Partido Comunista de España tried to intentionally repress its female membership from becoming more politically active from within the party. During fighting in Oviedo, women were on the battlefield serving in a variety of roles. At least one attended to the wounded while shelling went on around her. Others took up arms. Still more went from leftist position to leftist position with active shelling happening, providing fighters with food and motivational speeches.

During the Asturian conflict, there were a few instances of women initiated violence. This fed into paranoia among those on the right that women would violently try to seize power from men. Both on the left and the right, these women were not viewed as heroic, and men wanted to limit their potential for further political action. Women were also involved in building barricades, clothing repair, and street protests. For many women, this was the first time they were civically engaged without a male chaperone as in many cases, they were working on behalf of imprisoned male relatives. Women were also killed in this conflict. Aida Lafuente was active on the front, and died during the Asturian conflict. There were a number of women playing important roles behind the scenes in organizing. They included Dolores Ibárruri, Isabel de Albacete, Margarita Nelken y Mansbergen and Alicia García. They were aided by the PCE's Committee to Aid Workers' Children. Nelken was also involved in the strike, then accused of military rebellion and soon thereafter was forced into the exile that year, living in Paris but traveling to Scandinavia and the Soviet Union.

The PCE largely claimed credit, largely incorrectly, for the 1934 Asturian Miners' Strike. They used the confrontation to market themselves and build their membership into the tens of thousands. They also created their youth movement, Juventud Socialista Unificada (JSU) in partnership with PSOE in April 1936 as outgrowth of the Asturian events.

More recently, academics have debated if the Asturian miners's strike represented the real start of the Spanish Civil War. Imagery from the conflict was subsequently used by both sides for propaganda to further their own agenda. Propaganda used featuring the events in October 1934 featured women in gender conforming ways that did not challenge their roles as feminine. This was done by male leadership with the intention of counteracting the image of strong women political leaders, who unnerved many on the right. Right wing propaganda at the time featured women as vicious killers, who defied gender norms to eliminate the idea of Spanish motherhood.

=== Start of the Civil War ===
Location of Melilla, where Nationalist forces started their campaign in 1936.

On 17 July 1936, the Unión Militar Española launched a coup d'état in North Africa and Spain. They believed they would have an easy victory. They failed to predict the people's attachment to the Second Republic. With the Republic largely maintaining control over its Navy, Franco and others in the military successfully convinced Adolf Hitler to provide transport for Spanish troops from North Africa to the Iberian peninsula. These actions led to a divided Spain, and the protracted events of the Spanish Civil War. It would not officially end until 1 April 1939.

Franco's initial coalition included monarchists, conservative Republicans, Falange Española members, Carlist traditionalist, Roman Catholic clergy and the Spanish army. They had support from fascist Italy and Nazi Germany. The Republican side included Socialists, Communists, and various other left wing actors.

The military revolt was announced on the radio across the country, and people took to the streets immediately as they tried to determine the extent of the situation, and if it was a military or political conflict. Ibárruri would soon coin the phrase "¡No pasarán!" a few days later, on 18 July 1936 in Madrid while on the radio from the Ministry of the Interior's radio station, saying, "It is better to die on your feet than live on your knees. ¡No pasarán!"

Great Britain, France, Germany, Italy and the Soviet Union signed the Non-Intervention Treaty in August 1936, promising not to provide material support for the war to any of the parties, even as Germany and Italy were already and continued to provide support to Spain's fascists.

== Spanish Civil War (1936 - 1939) ==
For Soviet Communists, the Spanish Civil War was one of the most important in its history. It was one of the first times it was able to genuinely control national communist parties and influence domestic events abroad. It also prevented the international communist movement from becoming moribund at a time when there was a genuine risk that communism might only happen in Russia.

=== Political parties ===
The varying political parties during this period on the left would all work with each other and, in the latter stages of the war, against each other. PCE would often be at the center of much of this, trying to attract support for their Stalinist Communism ideology from various left wing factions. When they were not trying to directly collaborate, crossover in membership would see many communist women involved in other organizations.

==== Anti-fascists organizations ====
Anti-fascist organizations often attracted a heterogeneous membership. This at times could lead to major differences, discrepancies and priorities when it came to implementing anti-fascist programs. Different groups including socialists, communists and anarchists would sometimes work to take advantage of this inside these organizations.

===== Agrupación de Mujeres Antifascistas =====
Asociación de Mujeres contra la Guerra y el Fascismo underwent a second name change in 1936, shortly after the start of the Civil War. Their new name was Agrupación de Mujeres Antifascistas. From there, the group would play a prominent role in sending and supporting women on the front lines in the war.

===== Partido Comunista de España =====
While other communist organizations existed, Partido Comunista de España remained the dominant one. In the first year of the Civil War, the PCE rapidly increased their membership by nearly three-fold. Among the peasantry, women represented nearly a third of PCE's membership.

During the Civil War, Ibárruri earned herself the nickname La Pasionaria as she traveled the country to speak in opposition to Francoist forces. She also used radio to spread her message, becoming famous for calling men and women to arms, saying, "¡No pasarán!" One of the most famous phrases she uttered in the civil war was, "It is better to die on your feet than live on your knees." The Communist Party did not approve of her private life though, asking her to end her relationship with a male party member who was seventeen years younger than her, which she did.

Following the start of the civil war, Matilde Landa worked at a PCE affiliated war hospital in Madrid.

=== Civilians behind the frontlines ===
The Nationalists using rape by Berber forces as a way of bringing women and children into compliance was so problematic, that the British who were scared of allowing Republican refugees in lest they spread the contagion of Communism in the country, finally allowed 3,889 Basque children and 219 female Basque teaches in 1937 to board the Habana and the Goizeko Izarra and head to Britain. The British Government feared being made complicit in rape. Many women on the Republican side joined JSU, serving in civilian roles near the front.

=== Women in combat and on the front ===
==== Background ====
While the national branches of Communist Party supported sending foreign fighters to Spain to fight in the Civil War in the International Brigades, they often opposed their female members from going. When they sometimes agreed to send determined women to Spain, it was often in support roles as reporters or propagandists. The party apparatus in Spain then actively worked to keep women away from the front.

The first Spanish Republican women to die on the battlefield was Almeria born JSU affiliated miliciana Lina Odena on 13 September 1936. With Nationalist forces overrunning her position, the unit commander chose to commit suicide rather than to surrender at a battle in Guadix. Her death would be widely shared by both Republican and Falangist propagandists. With Nationalist forces threatening her with the potential of being raped by Moorish soldiers if she does not surrender, Republicans were able to cast her as an innocent who chose death rather than to be debased and lose her honor. Falangist propaganda said there was never there and there was never a threat of rape. This made Odena's death meaningless. Beyond that, Falangist propaganda implied Odena had been guilty of murdering a Catholic priest a few weeks prior, with her suicide was a way of escaping punishment.

==== Mobilization ====
The Spanish Civil War started on 17 July 1936 with a coup d'état. The military revolt that started the civil war did not immediately succeed in part because of women who took part in spontaneous uprisings.

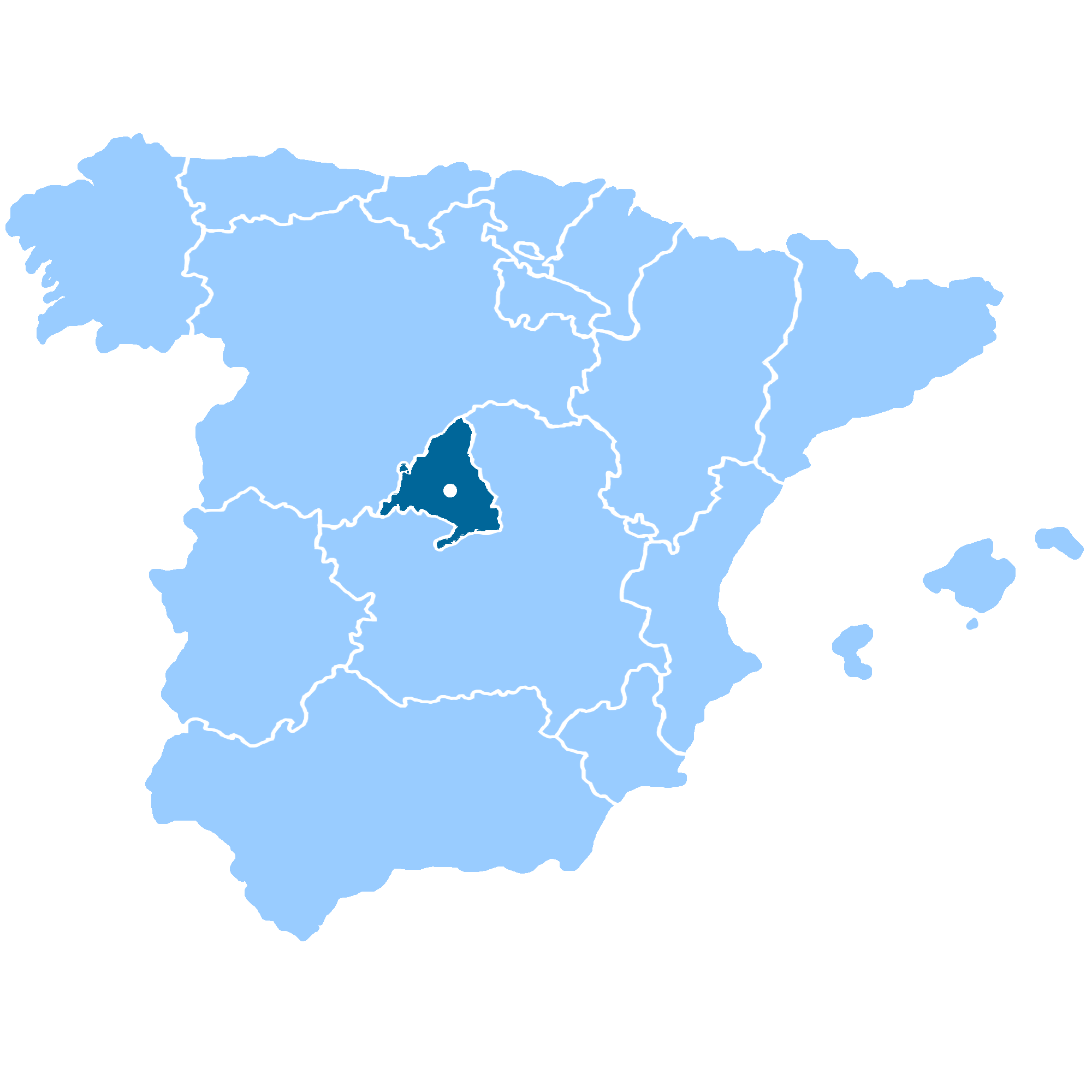
Location of Madrid, Spain's capital city.

One of the most important mass mobilizations of women in Spain's history was their participation on the anti-Nationalist front. Shortly after the start of the Civil War, around 1,000 Spanish women volunteered to serve on the front lines of the Republican side. One of the cities that saw the greatest number of armed women rise to its defense was Madrid. This quick mobilization of women was part of the reason that the Nationalists did not gain a quick victory, and the war became a more protracted affair.

Women were called to fight by other women, such as Dolores Ibárruri. In the last days of Republican control of Madrid, she implored both men and women to take to arms against Nationalist forces in the city. The numbers of women mobilized and armed behind the front in support of cities exceeded the numbers who were on the front line. At most, probably 1,000 women fought on the front lines, while several thousand served in city defense. The latter included a women's only battalion that served in Madrid.

Communists and anarchists columns attracted the most women among all the political groups on the Republican front. POUM attracted women fighters, but in smaller numbers. Partido Socialista Obrero Español (PSOE) was one of the only major actors on the left to immediately reject the idea of women participating in combat. The idea was too radical for them, and they believed women should serve as heroes at home, providing support to civilian populations well behind the front lines. Women who were members of PSOE who found their way to combat did so by joining communist and socialist youth groups.

==== On the front ====
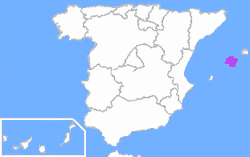
Location of Mallorca, where POUM had a column that included women fighters.

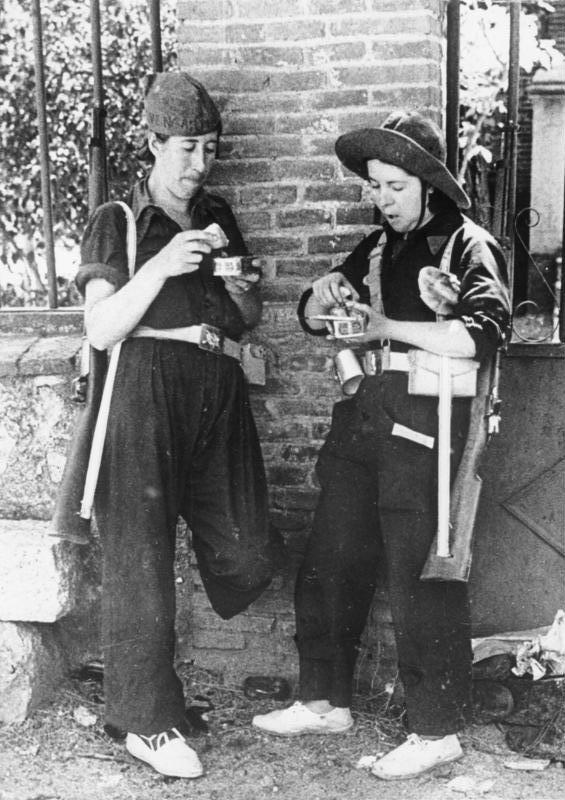
Milicianas with their weapons during the Spanish Civil War.

On the front, the norm was for women to serve in mixed gender battalion units. They were transferred around Spain, depending on military needs for troop reinforcements. Rearguard miliciana groups were more likely to be organized into women only battalions, and were more likely to be based in the same location as part of defensive units. As a consequence, the roles played by each tended to be different.

Women on the front often were faced with a duel burden of being expected to fight and to provide auxiliary support. Male leadership decisions to require this reinforced sexism inside the Republic, by allowing women to break free of gender norms by serving in combat but at the same time forcing them to engage in traditionally gendered tasks.

Most of the women serving in front line roles had their positions defined by the communist, anarchist or POUM leadership. Most of these gave women equal roles when it came to combat, and providing the same military contribution. Combat experience did not significantly differ based on the political affiliation of the battalion that women in combat were attached to.

Among the women serving in the international brigades, most worked as nurses, pharmacists or doctors. Some Jewish, Polish and American women did go to Spain, and did serve in combat. They were actively discouraged from doing so by anarchists, and outright banned from doing so by communists. Argentina García was on the front in October 1937 in San Esteban de las Cruces. The communist's bravery in battle was recognized with a promotion to Captain in her Astruias Battalion.

Communist women were able to achieve front line leadership roles. 22-year-old Aurora Arnáiz commanded a JSU column during the Siege of Madrid. Julia Manzanal became the Political Commissar for the Batallón Municipal de Madrid when she was only 17. From there, she armed herself with a rifle and a pistol, fighting on the front lines, serving as a guard and engaging in espionage role despite having enlisted initially with the role of educating her comrades in Communist ideology.

Union de Muchachas was a communist organized rearguard women's only battalion in Madrid that fought on the front line starting on 8 November 1936. The battalion included two thousand women aged fourteen to twenty-five who had been training since July 1936, when the Civil War began. Positioned at Segovia Bridge and near Getafe on the Carabanchel front and representing the bulk of the Republican forces in those positions, Union de Muchachas fighters were among the last to retreat. Women in rearguard battalions often met daily to practice weapons training, marching and drilling. Many also received specialized training in the use of machine guns.

Women in the Pasionaria Column of the Fifth Regiment of the Popular Militias often tried to transfer out. This was in part because column leaders often tried to keep women out of combat, and instead have them work in support roles for the column that included cook, and cleaning clothes and dishes. Captains in the Column often tried to force women assigned to the Column out.

==== Demobilization ====
There are conflicting accounts by historians as to when the decision was made to remove women from the front on the Republican side. One side dates the decision to late fall of 1936 as the date when Prime Minister Francisco Largo Caballero gave the order. Others date the order to March 1937. What is most likely is that various political and military leaders made their own decisions based on their own beliefs that led to different groups of female combatants gradually being withdrawn from the front. But whatever date ascribed, women were being encouraged to leave the front by September 1936.

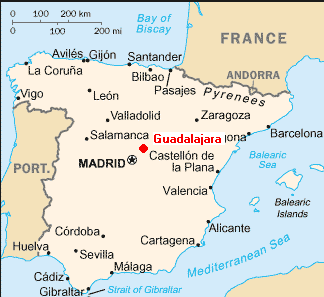
Location of Guadalajara, where women were told to leave the front in March 1937.

Women were told to leave the front in Guadalajara in March 1937. Following the battle, many were load into cars and taken to support positions further behind the lines. A few refused to leave, and their fate is uncertain though friends suspected most died in combat. Expelled soldiers included Leopoldine Kokes of the International Group of the Durruti Column. Some demobilized women left the front, and joined women's columns on the home front, in defense of cities like Madrid and Barcelona. When Juan Negrín became the head of the Republican armed forces in May 1937, women's time in combat ended as he continued efforts to regularize Republican forces.

Following their removal from the front, milicianas and women in general stopped featuring in Republican propaganda. Visually, they returned to their lives before the war, where their primary role was behind the scenes at home. Communists and anarchists columns attracted the most women among all the political groups on the Republican front. Stories about POUM militants became more well known as they were more likely to have published their memories or had better contacts with international media.

=== Death sentences and life in prison ===
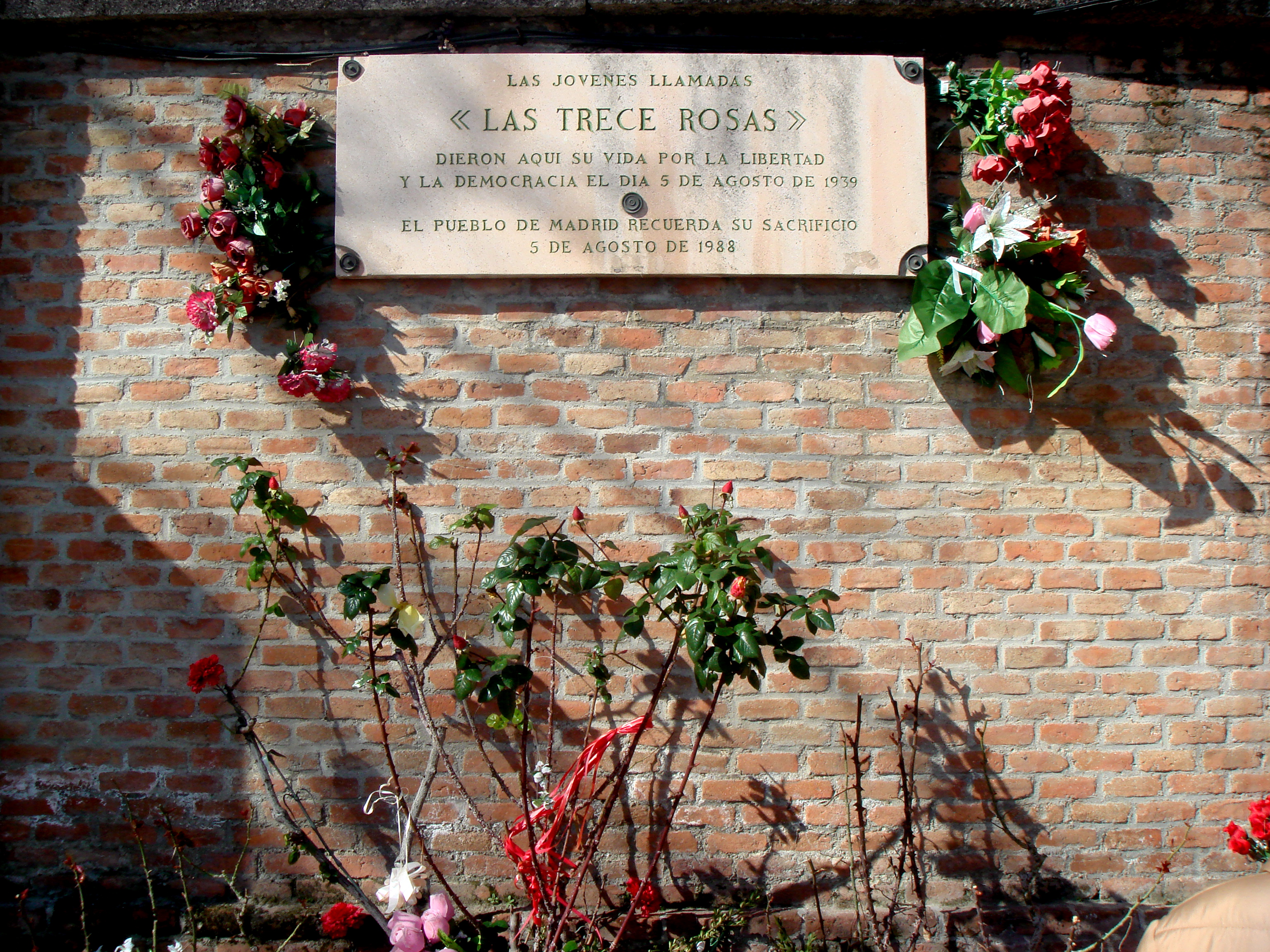
A plaque in the cemetery honoring Las Trece Rosas.

Republican women in prisons often faced situations their male counterparts did not have to deal with. Unlike their male counterparts, many women given death sentences for military rebellion were given the status of common criminals. Some women in Nationalist zones found their husbands arrested and executed because a Nationalist soldier coveted her. Children were removed from their mothers, left in the care of family or to live on the streets. Some women with sons who fought for the Republic were forced to watch them be tortured or executed. Prior to going to prison, some women found themselves raped by male police officers. Some women were removed from prison at night by Falangists who would then rape them. During these nights away from prison by Falangist forces, some women were also branded with a yoke and arrows. Borrowing from a practice being used by Mussolini's forces in Italy, women in prison were often forced to drink castor oil with the intention of giving them diarrhea. The purpose was to humiliate these women when they soiled themselves. Women in prison often had a toilet ratio of one toilet for every 200 women. By the end of the Civil War, the Las Ventas Model Prison had swelled from 500 female prisoners to over 11,000.

Republican women in prisons often faced situations their male counterparts did not have to deal with. Unlike their male counterparts, many women given death sentences for military rebellion were given the status of common criminals. Some women in Nationalist zones found their husbands arrested and executed because a Nationalist soldier coveted her. Children were removed from their mothers, left in the care of family or to live on the streets. Some women with sons who fought for the Republic were forced to watch them be tortured or executed. Prior to going to prison, some women found themselves raped by male police officers. Some women were removed from prison at night by Falangists who would then rape them. During these nights away from prison by Falangist forces, some women were also branded with a yoke and arrows. Borrowing from a practice being used by Mussolini's forces in Italy, women in prison were often forced to drink castor oil with the intention of giving them diarrhea. The purpose was to humiliate these women when they soiled themselves. Women in prison often had a toilet ratio of one toilet for every 200 women. By the end of the Civil War, the Las Ventas Model Prison had swelled from 500 female prisoners to over 11,000. Seven girls under the age of twenty-one were executed as part of a larger group of fifty-six prisoners in Madrid on 5 August 1939. The group became known as the Trece Rosas, and had all belonged to the United Socialist Youth (JSU). Casado Junta had gained access to JSU membership roles, and then left them to be found by supporters of Franco. This facilitated the arrest of the Trece Rosas, because the fascist had names and details of JSU members.

=== May Days of 1937 ===
In the lead up to the May Days events, Communists aligned with the Soviet Union had largely taken control of the ports, where most of the support materials and relief aid coming in for distribution around the country were from the Soviet Union. They soon became a de facto police force, and were already working to undermine anarchists. 1 May 1937 saw thousands of armed anarchists take to the streets, daring the government and police to disarm them. Open conflict started on 3 May 1937 in front of the Telefónica building. On 4 May 1937, the city of Madrid had come to a complete work stoppage, with machine guns appearing in placements along the major streets in the city. By the conclusion of major fighting on 8 May 1937, over 1,000 people would be dead and another 1,500 were wounded. POUM leadership would see this all come to a tragic head on 16 June 1937 when Andrés Nin and the POUM executive were arrested. The next day, foreign POUM members and supporters were arrested en masse at the Hotel Falcon and taken to prison. Eventually, many foreigner supporters of POUM in the group would be rescued in part because of the actions of the journalist George Tioli. The US Consulate, informed of the imprisonment thanks to Tioli, worked to secure the release of a number of them.

The remnants of the POUM leadership were put on trial in Barcelona on October 11, 1938. Ibárruri was quoted as saying of their arraignment, "If there is an adage which says that in normal times it is preferable to acquit a hundred guilty ones than to punish a single innocent one, when the life of a people is in danger it is better to convict a hundred innocent ones than to acquit a single guilty one."

== Francoist Spain (1938–1973) ==
Dolores Ibárruri went into exile in the Soviet Union from 1935 to 1960. In exile, she continued to reject feminism, while still expressing concern for the role of women in Spanish society. For her, women did not make up a unique group, but were part of a larger working class society for whom emancipation was sought. These views were expressed in her writings while in Soviet exile. Her views in this period were often out of alignment with how others on the left tried to portray her, namely as a consoling mother figure and as a maternal figure who did not contradict Spanish patriarchy. She continued to get support from Soviet Communist leadership in a great part because she did not contradict the feminine aspects attributed to her that did not undermine male leadership.

In 1939, Matilde Landa was tasked with reorganizing Madrid's Comité Provincial del Partido Comunista. Soon after, she was arrested by the Francoist government. Put into a prison in Sales, she was given a death sentence where she worked to overturn her and other women's death sentences by engaging in a writing campaign. By 1940, her death sentence was commuted and she was moved to a women's prison in Palma de Mallorca. This was one of the worst post-war women's prisons in Spain, where prison leaders also attempted coerced conversion to Catholicism. Rather than go through with a forced baptism in 1942, she committed suicide using a weapon. Landa did not immediately die, and lay in agony for over almost an hour before she died. During this time, prison officials baptized her.

=== Partido Comunista de España ===
Partido Comunista de España became the dominant clandestine political organization in Spain following the end of the Civil War. It would retain this position until the death of Franco saw PSOE replace it. Women were involved with the party, helping to organize covert armed resistance by serving in leadership roles and assisting in linking up political leaders in exile with those active on the ground in Spain.

During the later parts of the war and at its conclusion, some women from POUM were coerced into making false confessions in Moscow courtrooms, and then sent to Soviet prisons. Their major crime was being Trotskyites. It was only during the 1950s and 1960s that some of those women involved with POUM and Trotskyite purged began to re-evaluate their role in them; their change of hearts only occurred after Stalinist Communism lost its prestige among leftist circles.

=== Role in the family ===
For Spanish Communist women in exile, ideological beliefs of the period suggested mothers in this period should fade into the background, serving in roles that supported single women and men who could be more visible in the struggle against Franco. Communists emphasized a traditional view of motherhood espoused by Franco.

=== Milicianas ===
The end of the Civil War, and the victory of fascist forces, saw the return of traditional gender roles to Spain. This included the unacceptability of women serving in combat roles in the military. After the war, many milicianas faced difficulties. This included the general population being subjected to a propaganda war that ridiculed their involvement in the conflict. At the same time, the new government sought them out to put them in prison or torture them. Many fighters were also illiterate, and found this to be restrict later activities. This was coupled with restrictions placed on some when in exile in France that limited their opportunities. For those who remained politically active, they had to deal with open sexism in the Communist Party and in anarchist circles.

Some women's veterans of the war never retired. They instead continued active violence against the state as part of communist and anarchist cells, using terrorism like tactics. This included bombing Guardia Civil positions, robbing banks and attacking offices of Falanage. Women involved with this resistance effort included Victòria Pujolar, Adelaida Abarca Izquierdo and Angelita Ramis. These women, and women like them, served as go betweens for exiled leaders in France and those on the ground in Spain. They worked with Communist Party leaders to plan attacks.
