= 1888 PSOE party congress =

First Congress of the Spanish Socialist Workers' Party

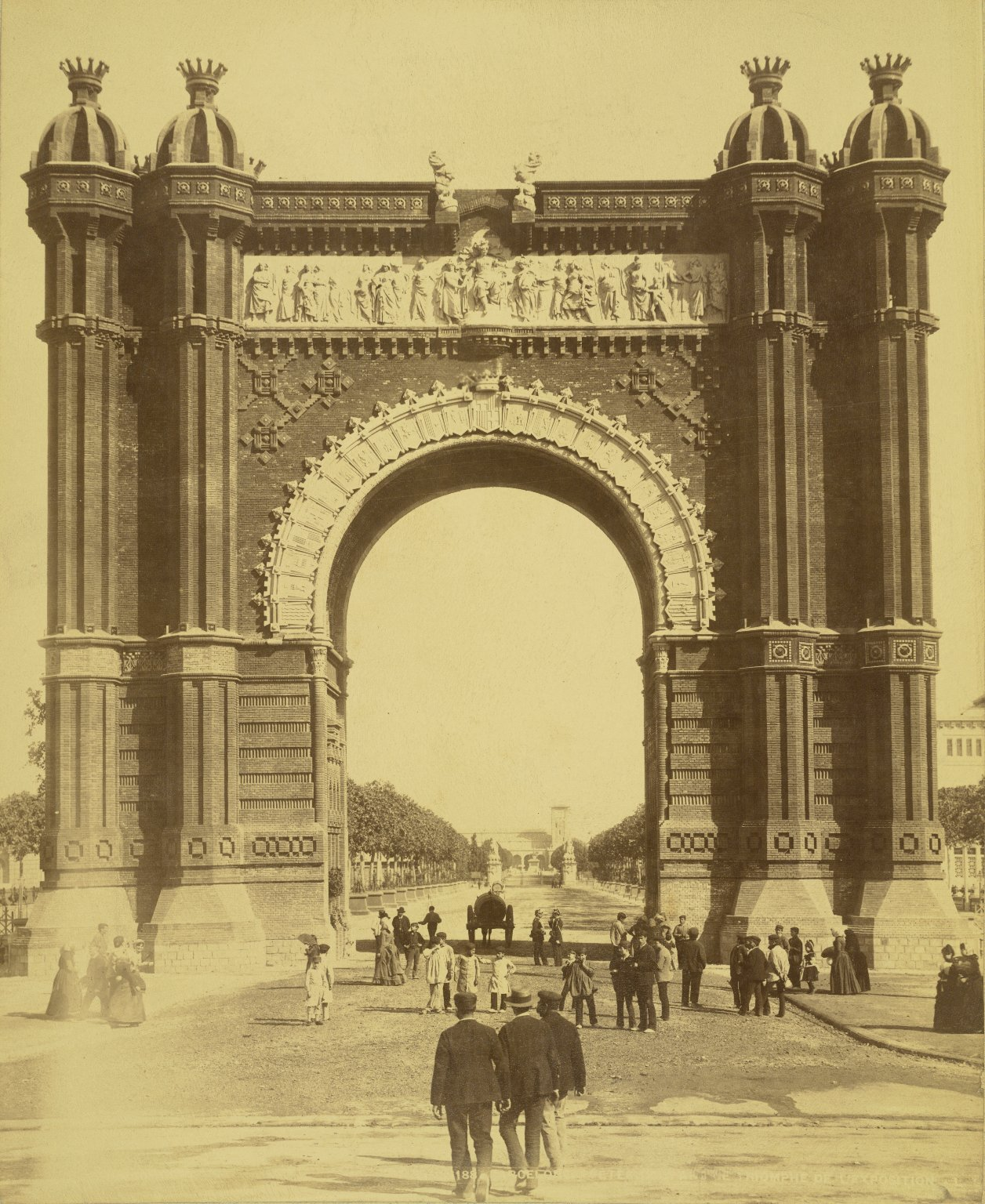
Arch of Triomf, which allowed you to enter the site of the Barcelona Universal Exposition (1888), which coincided with the Congress celebration.

The First Congress of the PSOE was held in Barcelona (Spain) between August 23 to 25, 1888, during the regency of Maria Christina of Habsburg, nine days after the Barcelona Workers' Congress of 1888 in which the General Union of Workers was founded, linked to the Spanish Socialist Workers' Party (Partido Socialista Obrero Español, PSOE), founded in Madrid in 1879. Thus, "for the first time in the history of Spain, a clear and distinct definition was proposed between a party of the working class (which aspires to the exercise of power) and a resistance organization or union, whose aim is to defend the interests of all workers in their relations of production (with employers or companies) and, in general, in their living conditions".

== Origins of Socialism in Spain ==
Socialism was introduced in Spain in 1849, with the creation of the Democratic Party, progressive and close to socialist principles. However, Marxist socialism did not appear in Spain until the celebration of the First International (1864). At that time there was a heated debate in the Spanish Cortes as to whetheror not the International should be legalized in Spain. It was ultimately outlawed, but Marxist and anarchist ideas spread among the Spanish working class, despite the clandestinity and the dissolution of the First International.

== Background ==
The Madrid Marxist group, which had been expelled from the Spanish Regional Federation of the IWA in June 1872 and which the following month formed the ephemeral New Madrid Federation (Nueva Federación Madrileña), the following month, founded the Socialist Workers’ Party in May 1879. During the period of clandestinity that began in January 1874, when the First International in Spain was banned in Spain, it had used the Asociación del Arte de Imprimir as its legal cover.

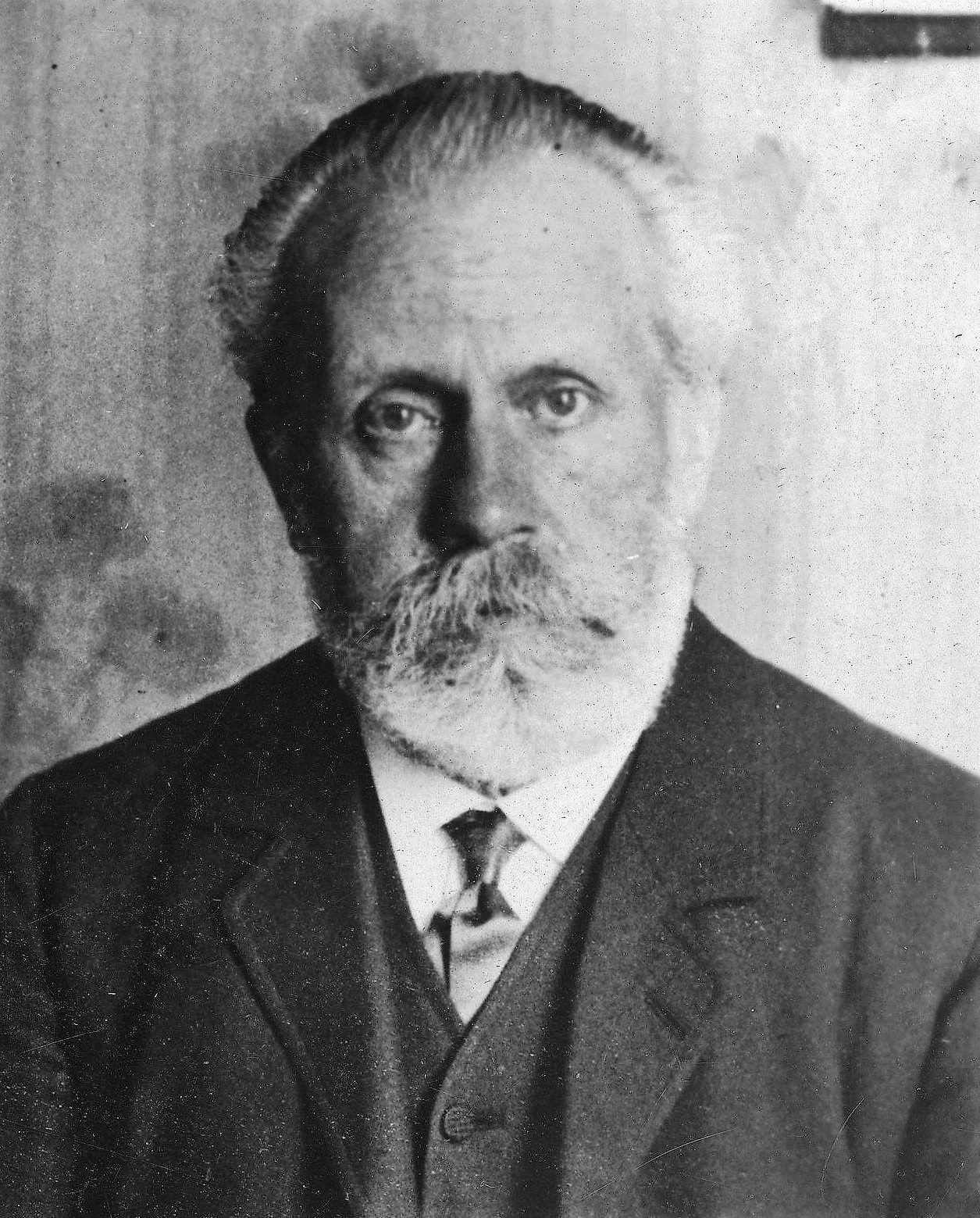
Pablo Iglesias, first president of the Spanish Socialist Workers' Party.

On July 20, 1879, the first meeting of the new party was held in a tavern on Visitación Street, attended by 21 people, at which the first Executive Committee of the party was elected, Pablo Iglesias, secretary; Inocente Calleja, treasurer; Alejandro Ocina, accountant; and Alejandro Calderón and Gonzalo Zubiarre, members, and the "Manifesto and Program" was approved, "until a workers' congress" could "ratify or amend it." This document stated:

[...] The Spanish Democratic Socialist Workers Party declares that its aspirations are: the abolition of classes, that is, the complete emancipation of the workers; the transformation of individual property into social property or the property of the whole society; the possession of political power by the working class.

The first group of the party to be formed outside Madrid was in Guadalajara, and the next one in Barcelona, thanks to the trip of the typographer Toribio Reoyo, who contacted Josep Pàmias, director of El Obrero, and members of the "societario" movement. The Barcelona group decided to clandestinely edit the Manifesto and Program approved on July 20, but introduced some modifications such as "The constitution of society on the basis of economic federation, scientific organization of work and comprehensive education for all individuals of both sexes," and further specified the immediate political objectives, such as the achievement of universal suffrage. Later, two other nuclei of the party were formed in Valencia and Sant Martí de Provensals.

In 1882, the Barcelona group, led by Pàmias, held a Workers' Congress in which 88 workers' organizations were represented and in which it was decided to advise the workers to join the newly created Democratic Socialist Workers' Party.

In 1883, the party decided to take advantage of the opportunity offered by the newly created Commission of Social Reforms and presented the "Written Report of the Madrid Socialist Grouping", a work by Jaime Vera that Manuel Tuñón de Lara considers "the most important theoretical document of Spanish Marxism in the 19th century". Pablo Iglesias, for his part, wrote the report of the Asociación del Arte de Impresión and was the spokesman of the Madrid Group when it was presented to the Commission, Antonio García Quejido and Facundo Perezagua also intervened.

At the beginning of 1885, the first crisis within the party arose from the disagreement between Pablo Iglesias, on the one hand, and Jaime Vera and Francisco Mora Méndez, on the other, in the debate over the principles that should guide the newspaper that it had been decided to create in order to spread socialist ideas and strengthen the organization. Vera defended that the Federal Republicans were potential allies of the socialists, while Pablo Iglesias opposed any pact with the "bourgeois" parties. Antonio García Quejido tried to mediate, but Iglesias' position prevailed, and Vera and Mora left the active militancy for four and fifteen years, respectively. Finally, in the Fourth Foundation, it was decided that the newspaper should "fight against all bourgeois parties and especially against the doctrines of the advanced ones, while stating that between the republican and monarchical forms of government, El Socialista always prefers the former". The first issue of the newspaper, called El Socialista was published on March 12, 1886. The editorial board consisted of six members, but the weight of the publication was carried by Pablo Iglesias and Gómez Latorre. José Mesa sent many contributions and translations from Paris.

In the middle of 1887, the Mataró Workers' Center proposed to the Barcelona Workers' Center the celebration of a Workers' Congress for the following year, coinciding with the Barcelona Universal Exposition (1888), thus resuming the project of creating a national organization that had been proposed at the 1882 meeting. The Barcelona Center accepted the idea and published the call in September. Antonio García Quejido, who was in Barcelona, transmitted the proposal to the socialist group in Madrid, which not only supported it but also decided to take advantage of the occasion to hold the First Congress of the Socialist Workers Party, founded in 1879, immediately afterwards.

== The Congress ==
Whereas:

This society is unjust because it divides its members into two unequal and antagonistic classes: one, the bourgeoisie, which, possessing the instruments of labor, is the ruling class; the other, the proletariat, which, possessing only its life force, is the dominated class;

The economic subjection of the proletariat is the first cause of slavery in all its forms: social misery, intellectual degradation and political dependence;

The privileges of the bourgeoisie are guaranteed by the political power it uses to dominate the proletariat.

On the other hand:

Whereas necessity, reason and justice demand that inequality and antagonism between one class and the other should disappear by reforming or destroying the social state which produces them;

This can only be achieved by transforming the individual or corporate ownership of the instruments of labor into the common property of society as a whole;

The powerful lever with which the proletariat must destroy the obstacles to the transformation of property must be the political power which the bourgeoisie uses to prevent the vindication of our rights;

The Socialist Party declares that it has two aspirations:

The possession of political power by the working class.

The transformation of individual or corporate ownership of the instruments of labor into collective, social or common property. By instruments of labor we mean land, mines, transportation, factories, machinery, capital currency, etc.

The organization of society on the basis of an economic federation, the usufruct of the instruments of labor by the workers' collectives, guaranteeing to all its members the total product of their labor, and the general scientific and special teaching of each profession to individuals of both sexes.

The satisfaction by society of the needs of those handicapped by age or infirmity.

In short, the ideal of the Spanish Socialist Workers' Party is the complete emancipation of the working class, that is, the abolition of all social classes and their transformation into a single class of workers, owners of the fruits of their labor, free, equal, honest and intelligent.

— PSOE program approved at the First Congress. 1888.

The Congress began on August 23, 1888, nine days after the conclusion of the Barcelona Workers' Congress of 1888, in which the General Union of Workers was founded. It was attended by 18 delegates, all of them manual workers, representing 20 groups of the party: 13 from Catalonia, plus Madrid, Guadalajara, Valencia, Xàtiva, Linares, Málaga and Bilbao, the latter founded in 1886 by Facundo Perezagua.

The Congress approved the party program, in which, according to Manuel Tuñón de Lara "certain utopian elements are still present; the 'economic federation' resembles more a Proudhonian residue rathen than an interpretation of Engels' thesis on the higher stage of the disappearance of the state; the right to the 'full product of labor' is likewise a pre-Marxist formulation that does not take into account the need to reproduce and expand the means of production. As for the "ethic" of "honest and intelligent", how can we not see in it a continuation of the spirit of the Constitution of Cádiz, article 6 of which prescribed that Spaniards should be 'just and beneficent'".

At the Congress, the relationship with the "bourgeois" parties was discussed, with Pablo Iglesias' thesis of maintaining a "constant and harsh war" with them, regardless of their political orientation, being reaffirmed. Strikes were also discussed, and it was agreed that "the P.S.O. will encourage the resistance movement as much as possible and will support with all its strength the struggles that the workers' organizations are waging against the bosses," referring to the recently founded General Union of Workers.

As for the organization of the party, it was decided that it would be formed by local groups and, at the top, by a National Committee appointed by the Socialist Workers' Party of the Community of Madrid (a power it maintained until 1915, although its president was elected at the congresses from 1894 onwards). It was also decided to send a delegate to Paris, where a workers' congress was to be held that would give birth to the Second International. The Madrid Grouping appointed the following National Committee: Pablo Iglesias, president; Francisco Diego, secretary; Francisco Carrero, treasurer; and Mariano Rodríguez and Antonio Atienza, members.

The Congress closed on August 25, and subsequent Congresses were held in Bilbao (1890), Valencia (1892), and Madrid (1894 and 1899).

== See also ==
- Pablo Iglesias Posse
- Spanish Socialist Workers' Party

== Bibliography ==
- Juliá, Santos (1997). Los socialistas en la política española, 1879-1982 (Taurus ed.). Madrid. ISBN 84-306-0010-8.
- Termes, Josep (2011). Historia del anarquismo en España (1870-1980). Barcelona: RBA. ISBN 978-84-9006-017-9.
- Tuñón de Lara, Manuel (1977). El movimiento obrero en la historia de España. I.1832-1899 (2 ed.). Barcelona: Laia. ISBN 84-7222-331-0.
