= Eduardo Torralba Beci =

Spanish journalist and politician (1881–1929)

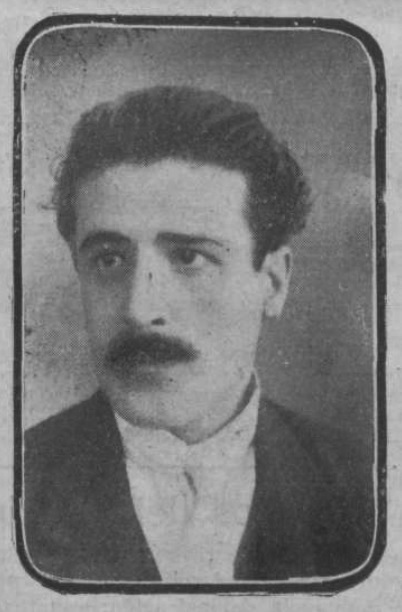
- Born: 1881
- Died: 1929 (aged 47–48)
- Occupation: Journalist
- Known for: Co-founder of Communist Workers Party

Eduardo Torralba Beci (1881–1929) was a Spanish journalist and politician. He joined different left-wing parties and co-founded Communist Workers Party. He was among the editors-in-chief of El Socialista, official organ of the Spanish Socialist Workers' Party.

== Biography ==
Torralba was born in 1881. He was a journalist by profession. In 1904 he began to head the Spanish Socialist Youth. He was arrested and detained in 1906 due to his statements which were regarded as insults to the religion. He was a member of the Spanish Socialist Workers' Party. Between 1914 and 1916 he served at the executive committee of the General Union of Workers. In 1914 he was also appointed editor-in-chief of the official newspaper of the Spanish Socialist Workers' Party, El Socialista. Torralba replaced Mariano García Cortes in the post. Torralba's tenure as the editor of the paper ended in 1915 when Pablo Iglesias, founder of the paper, retook the post.

In 1918 Torralba was among the members of the first national committee of the Communist Party. In April 1921 he co-founded the Communist Workers Party. He represented the party at the Third World Congress of the Comintern. He died in 1929.
