= El Socialista =

El Socialista or Socialista may refer to:

- El Socialista (newspaper), a Spanish newspaper since 1886
- El Socialista, newspaper of the Revolutionary Socialist Party (Peru)
- Socialista, a daily newspaper in Czechoslovakia 1923–1925

== See also ==
- El Socialista Manchego, a weekly newspaper from Alcázar de Cervantes, Spain 1932–1938
