= Facundo Perezagua =

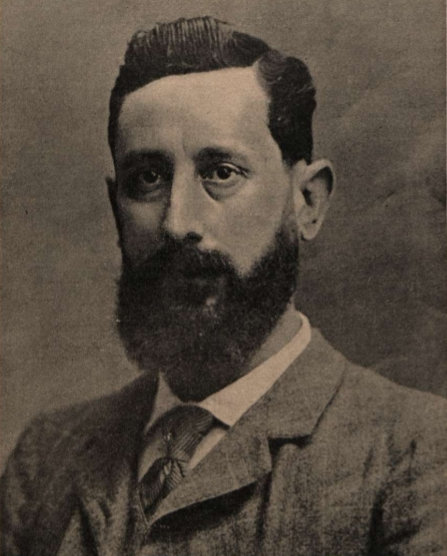
- Portrait of Facundo Perezagua published in 1910 in Vida Socialista
- Born: Facundo Perezagua Suárez; 28 November 1860; Toledo, Spain
- Died: 29 March 1935 (aged 74); Bilbao, Basque Country, Spain
- Occupations: Trade unionist, metal worker
- Political party: PSOE (1888−1921); PCOE (1921); PCE (1921–1935)

Facundo Perezagua Suárez (27 November 1860 – 29 April 1935) was a Spanish politician and trade unionist who was a founding member of the Spanish Socialist Workers' Party and the General Union of Workers in Vizcaya. He was one of the main labor leaders of Vizcaya who laid the foundations for the founding of the historic Communist Party of the Basque Country.

== Biography ==
Perezagua was born in Toledo in 1860 to a working-class family. A metalworker by profession, he became an apprentice at the Toledo Arms Factory during the Third Carlist War, but was fired at its end. He later moved to Madrid, where he met Pablo Iglesias and became professionally involved in socialist politics. He was sent to where he would be responsible for the spreading of socialist ideas among the workers of Vizcaya. First he conducted work among the miners of Somorrostro and later among the metalworkers of the Left Bank of the Nervión. Perezagua arrived in Bilbao on 20 April 1885. With the help of other socialist militants, Perezagua was responsible for the foundation of the first socialist groups in Vizcaya. On 11 July 1886 the Bilbao Socialist Group under his leadership.

In August 1888 he was one of the participants in the founding congress of the Spanish Socialist Workers' Party (PSOE), held in Barcelona. Remaining a prominent leader of the PSOE until the beginning of the 20th-century, Perezagua came in to conflict with rising Indalecio Prieto, with whom he was competing for the leadership of the party in Biscay, over the question of alliance with the Republicans which he opposed. Eventually Perezagua was left in the minority in 1914 and, accused of trying to provoke a split within the party, he was expelled in 1915. However, he was readmitted in 1919, thanks to the great prestige that he still retained.

After the October Revolution, Perezagua together with the "terceristas" (left-wing of the PSOE) was in favour of adopting the "Twenty-one Conditions" for joining the Communist International. This led to the creation of the creating the Spanish Communist Workers' Party (PCOE) on 13 April 1921. The PCOE would later merge with an earlier socialist split, the Spanish Communist Party, to form the Communist Party of Spain (PCE).

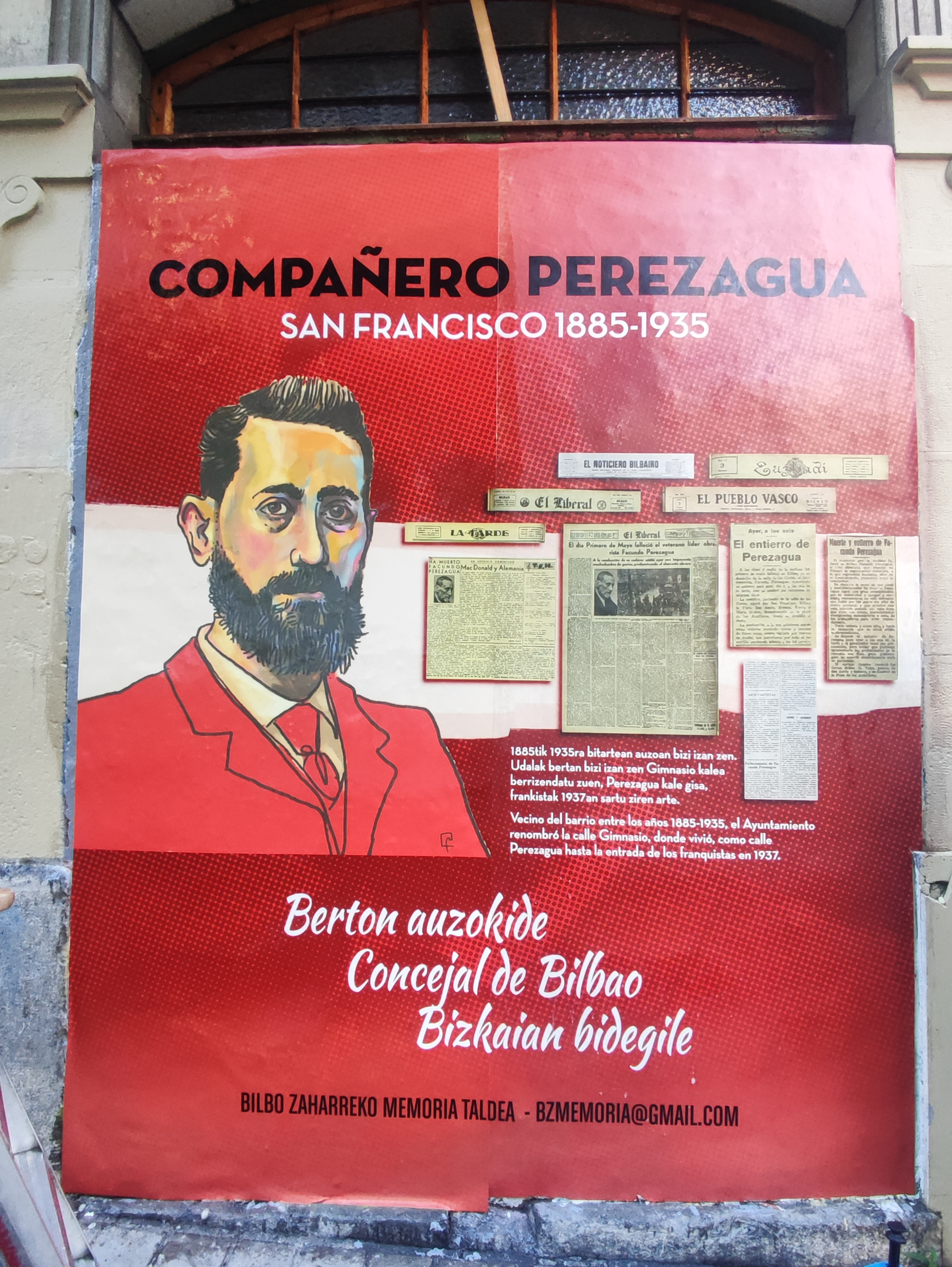
Mural tribute to Facundo Perezagua, 2025

Perezagua was one of the main leaders of the PCE during the dictatorship of Primo de Rivera. However, after the end of the dictatorship he withdrew from the front line of Spanish politics, although he was a candidate for Vizcaya-capital in the legislative elections of 1933, in which the PCE ran alone, without obtaining representation. He spent the last years of his life ill and isolated but remained a popular figure in the Spanish and Basque workers movement. His funeral was attended by thousands of workers and communists in Bilbao.

== Acknowledgements ==
- During the Spanish Civil War, the Basque communists named one of the communist battalions of the Eusko Gudarostea after him. It was the main battalion of the Communist Party of Euskadi and played a decisive role in the defence of Bilbao.
- The current Gimnasio Street in the San Francisco neighbourhood of Bilbao was named after him until 1937.
- 2025 The ‘Bilbao La Vieja Memory Group’ organised a tribute to Facundo Perezagua, on the 90th anniversary of his death.
