= Virginia González Polo =

Spanish political and feminist leader, socialist, and communist

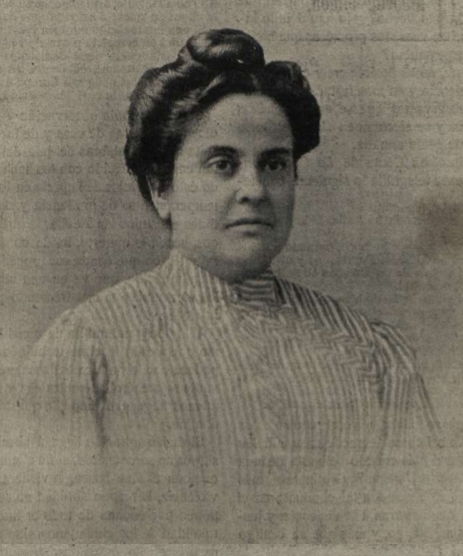
- Portrait of Virginia González published in Vida Socialista in 1911
- Born: 2 April 1873; Valladolid
- Died: 15 August 1923 (aged 50); Madrid
- Political party: PSOE (−1921); PCOE (1921); PCE (1921–1923)

Virginia González Polo (2 April 1873 – 15 August 1923) was a Spanish political and feminist leader, socialist, and communist.

== Biography ==
She was born in Valladolid to a working-class family of 22 children. Her father was a lathe operator and her mother a weaver. She began work at nine, embroidering shoes. She married Lorenzo Rodríguez Echevarría and they moved to La Coruña where their only son, César Rodríguez González, was born. There she began to mingle in anarchist circles, joining the Society of Shoemakers and Embroiderers of La Coruña (Sociedad de Zapateros y Guarnicioneros de La Coruña).

In 1899 she moved her family to Bilbao, where she joined the General Union of Workers (UGT, Unión General de Trabajadores), representing footwear workers in the 8th Congress of the UGT in 1905. A year earlier, in 1904, she founded the Women's Socialist Group of Bilbao.

She lived in Argentina for two years, then returned to Spain and established herself in León, where she participated in the general strike of 1909. For this she was arrested and deported from the city. After some time in Bayonne, she moved to Madrid in 1910, joining the Women's Socialist Group of Madrid. She began a period of intense political and union organizing, making numerous trips to hold meetings around Spain.

In 1915 she served on the National Committee of the Spanish Socialist Workers' Party (Partido Socialista Obrero Español, PSOE), and in 1916, of the UGT as well. During the general strike of 1917, she was on the Strike Committee, and was arrested with the rest of the committee at 12 Desengaño Street. She avoided prison, stating that her comrades were only in the house to help with the domestic chores.

A member of the Third International, she abandoned the PSOE after the 3rd Special Congress of the PSOE, in which they refused the imposition of the Third International's 21 conditions. On 13 April 1921 she helped start the Spanish Communist Workers' Party (Partido Comunista Obrero Español, PCOE). She was elected by the PCOE as a delegate to the 3rd Congress of the Communist International in Moscow, but while passing through Paris, she became seriously ill and was forced to return home. At the 1st Congress of the Communist Party of Spain (PCE), held in March 1922, she was elected the female secretary of the Central Committee of the PCE, the party of which her son César Rodríguez González, would become the general secretary of a year later.

Her last public appearance, shortly before her death, was a rally against the Rif War in Morocco.

She died in Madrid on 15 August 1923.

== Bibliography ==
- de Albornoz, Aurora (1977). "Dirigente obrera, feminista, fundadora del P.C.E.: Virginia González, mujer de acción" [Workers' leader, feminist, founder of the P.C.E.: Virginia González, woman of action]. Tiempo de historia (PDF). Vol. 32. pp. 26–29. ISSN 0210-7333.
- del Moral Vargas, Marta (2010). "En los márgenes del poder, en primera línea de las manifestaciones obreras: la representación de la militancia femenina en el Partido Socialista (1906–1927)" [In the margins of power, on the front line of the workers' demonstrations: representing women's militancy in the Socialist Party (1906–1927)]. Feminismo/s: Género e imagen del poder en la historia contemporánea (PDF). Vol. 16. pp. 107–138. ISSN 1696-8166.
- Ackelsberg, Martha A. (2005). "Anarchism, Anarcho-Syndicalism, and Popular Motivation". Free Women of Spain: Anarchism and the Struggle for the Emancipation of Women. AK Press. pp. 67–79. ISBN 1902593960.
