= José Bullejos =

Spanish Communist politician

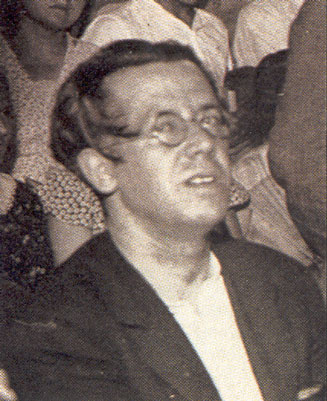

General Secretary of the Communist Party of Spain
- In office 1925–1932
- Preceded by: César Rodríguez González
- Succeeded by: José Díaz

Personal details
- Born: December 7, 1899 Granada, Spain
- Died: 25 March 1974 (aged 74) Mexico City, Mexico

José Bullejos y Sánchez (7 December 1899 – 25 March 1974) was a Spanish communist politician. He served as the second General Secretary of the Communist Party of Spain from 1925 to 1932.

== Early life and political activities ==
Bullejos earned a university law degree. Gaining a job as a postal clerk in Bilbao he joined in the postal strike of 1918-19 and joined the Unión General de Trabajadores (UGT) trade union. He also participated in the original Spanish Communist Party formed in 1920 and remained with the party after it merged with another communist organization, the Spanish Communist Workers' Party, in 1921 (forming the new Communist Party of Spain or PCE). Heading the party's Vizcayan section, he advanced to the leadership position upon the arrest of the first general secretary, Antonio García Quejido, in January 1925. Bullejos would continue to hold the top post for nearly eight years.

== General secretary of the PCE ==
Inheriting a politically divided party, Bullejos attempted to unify the disparate factions, achieving greater unity in Madrid but having less success with the PCE-affiliated FCC-B in Barcelona. He also conducted a purge of politically suspect members, which weakened the already divided party further. Bullejos was himself arrested in 1928 and temporarily replaced as leader of the PCE by Gabriel León Trilla.

Bullejos struggled to maintain PCE relations not only with other Spanish leftists, but with the Soviet Union. Visiting Moscow with other PCE leaders in May 1931, Bullejos was astonished when asked by Comintern official Dmitry Manuilsky whether in Spain feudal lords still forced Spanish peasants to do unpaid labor; he was further told that, "there is more feudalism in Spain than you think." Bullejos told Manuilsky that there were no overt remnants of feudalism in his country but failed to convince him that the "revolution" in Spain was opposed not by feudal monarchists but by a modern bourgeoisie.

He was re-confirmed as general-secretary at the PCE's fourth party congress in Seville in March 1932. When Bullejos and other PCE leaders backed the Republican government against the sanjurjada coup in August and produced pro-Republic slogans, Victorio Codovilla, the Comintern advisor in Madrid, denounced him and two other leaders as counter-revolutionaries. Bullejos resigned his post. When an initial vote failed to officially condemn him as counter-revolutionary, he was called to Moscow. In his absence, Codovilla arranged a new vote which settled the matter and completely denounced Bullejos and the others, who were then expelled from the PCE in October. The general secretaryship passed to José Díaz Ramos.

== Post PCE ==
Following his expulsion from the PCE and Comintern, José Bullejos joined the Spanish Socialist Workers' Party (PSOE). With the end of the civil war and the defeat of the Second Republic by the forces of Francisco Franco he fled to Mexico. There in 1945 he published a book entitled Europa entre dos guerras, 1918-1938. Later he wrote several more works including: Movimiento y Doctrina Sociales, La Comintern en España, and Espana en la segunda Republica.

Preceded by Antonio García Quejido	General Secretary of the Communist Party of Spain; 1925-1932	Succeeded by José Diaz Ramos
