= César Rodríguez González =

Spanish socialist journalist and politician

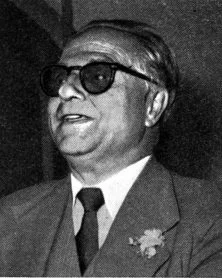

General Secretary of the Communist Party of Spain
- In office 1923–1925
- Preceded by: Antonio García Quejido
- Succeeded by: José Bullejos

Personal details
- Born: 2 February 1894 A Coruña, Kingdom of Spain
- Died: 15 August 1962 (aged 68) Mexico

César Rodríguez González (2 February 1894 – 15 August 1962) was a Spanish socialist journalist and politician.

== Life and career ==
Born in A Coruña, Galicia as the son of fellow socialist and communist Virginia González Polo, he was the editor of Madrid-based newspapers España Nueva, Informaciones and El Socialista. He was a member of the Socialist Youth of Spain (JSE), and rose to a secretarial role in the Spanish Socialist Workers' Party (PSOE) from 1920 to 1921.

A supporter of the Third International, in April 1921 Rodríguez González was a founding member of the Spanish Communist Workers' Party (POCE) and represented them at the Third Congress of the Communist International in Moscow weeks later. In 1923, he became secretary general of the Communist Party of Spain (PCE), succeeding its first leader, Antonio García Quejido. In December 1923, he began a prison sentence of two years and four months for publishing articles insulting the army during the Dictatorship of Primo de Rivera.

Upon leaving prison, Rodríguez González reverted to the PSOE and in 1933 was inducted as a Freemason, reaching the second grade. He worked in a bank in Valencia during the Spanish Civil War, and fled to Mexico at the end of the conflict, where he worked in journalism and finance. A follower of Juan Negrín, he was expelled from the PSOE in 1946 for not joining its official branch in Mexico. In 2008, Negrín and all of his expelled followers were posthumously readmitted to the party.
