= José Díaz (Spanish politician) =

Spanish trade unionist and Communist politician

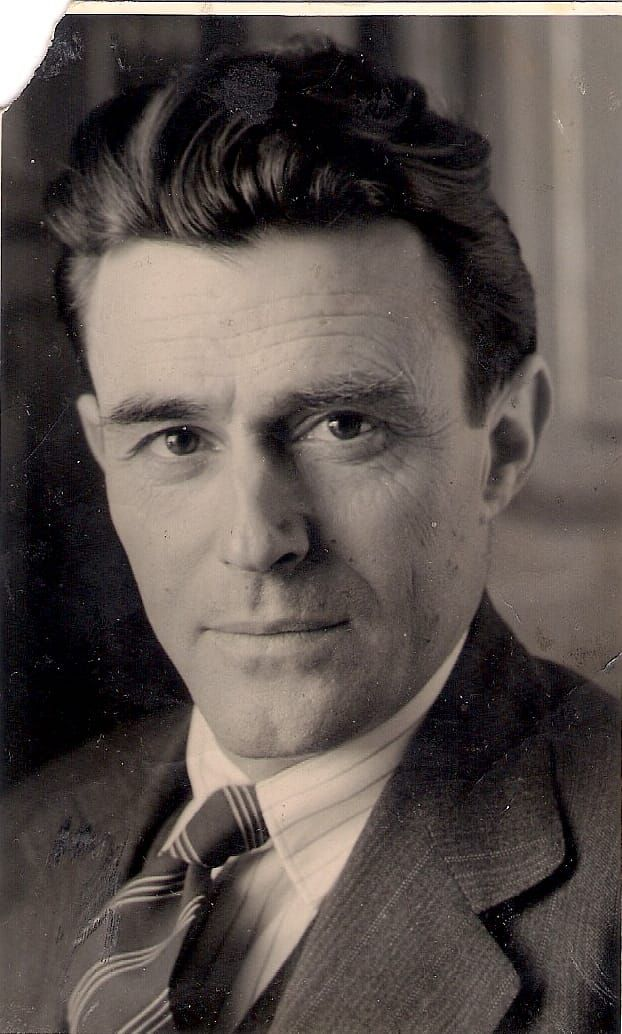

General Secretary of the Communist Party of Spain
- In office 1932–1942
- Preceded by: José Bullejos
- Succeeded by: Dolores Ibárruri

Personal details
- Born: José Díaz Ramos; 3 May 1895 Seville, Kingdom of Spain
- Died: 19 March 1942 (aged 46) Tbilisi, Georgia SSR, Soviet Union
- Party: PCE

José Díaz Ramos (3 May 1895 – 19 March 1942) was a Spanish trade unionist and communist politician. He was the General Secretary of the Communist Party of Spain during the Spanish Civil War.

== Trade unionism ==
Born in Sevilla and a baker by trade since age eleven, at 18 joined La Aurora, the Union of Seville bakers, who soon after joined the anarchist Confederación Nacional del Trabajo. He became known as the leader of a strike in 1917 and in 1920 participated in the general strike called by the leadership of the CNT, which ended in failure. After the start of Miguel Primo de Rivera's dictatorship, Díaz continued his labor activism in clandestinity being arrested in Madrid in 1925. In 1927, already out of jail, he joined the Communist Party of Spain (PCE) with much of the leaders of Seville anarchism. He was able to attract the more radical workers, who were disenchanted with the traditional unions, as well as helping the PCE profit from rivalry between the socialist Unión General de Trabajadores and the anarchist Confederación Nacional del Trabajo.

== Leadership in Spain ==
In 1932 the Spanish Communist Party made a major change in direction when it abandoned the Comintern slogan "Workers' and Peasants' Government" and adopted "Defense of the Republic". Díaz was among the new leaders of the party who succeeded José Bullejos. The others were Vicente Uribe, Antonio Mije, Juan Astigarrabía and Jesús Hernández Tomás. The 4th PCE Congress in Sevilla (March 1932) elected him a member of the Central Committee; in September of the same year, he joined the Politburo, and soon after was appointed general secretary. In this capacity, Díaz was replacing José Bullejos, who had been expelled for opposing the official party line during a "campaign of Bolshevisation" that enforced Marxism-Leninism as the official Ideology of the party. In 1935, he and Dolores Ibárruri led the PCE delegation to the 7th Comintern Congress, where Georgi Dimitrov introduced the politic of "united front against Fascism", which signaled world communists to seek an alliance with movements previously considered bourgeois.

With PCE participation in the Spanish Popular Front government and the Civil War, Díaz dedicated himself to inner party politics, without occupying official positions in the administration of the Second Spanish Republic. His focus was on contributing to the military victory of the Republican forces over Francisco Franco's troops, and was a noted critic of Juan Domingo Astigarrabia and his Communist Party of Euskadi (the PCE wing in the Basque Country), whom he saw as too sympathetic to Basque nationalism. His sister Carmen Díaz and the mother of his daughter, Teresa Santos, were killed in Seville at the orders of General Gonzalo Queipo de Llano, in the early days of the war.

== In the Soviet Union ==
Diaz's health deteriorated due to stomach cancer, and he left Spain for the Soviet Union in November 1938, being operated on in Leningrad. He remained in Moscow after the Republican defeat and the start of World War II, being active as a cadre in the Comintern Secretariat (an overseer of communists in Spain, South America, and British India). Díaz also wrote an essay containing self-criticism, one prompted by the ideological demands of the Great Purge and Stalin's personality cult, entitled Las enseñanzas de Stalin, guía luminoso para los comunistas españoles ("The Teachings of Stalin, a Luminous Guide for the Spanish Communists"). The articles he wrote in the period were collected as Tres años de lucha ("Three Years of Struggle").

When the German forces invaded the Soviet state in June 1941, José Díaz was forced to take refuge in Pushkin. In autumn, he settled in Tbilisi (Georgian SSR) but his ailment and the immense pain caused him to take his own life that spring. The circumstances of his death have been disputed ever since, with many believing that he had actually been murdered on Stalin's orders. Notably, the stance Díaz had taken in 1939, when he asked for the PCE to be given full control over the Republican government, went clearly (albeit perhaps unwittingly) against Stalin's strategy.

The KGB file concerning him was declassified in the 1990s (after the fall of the Soviet Union): it failed to provide any evidence incriminating Stalin's government. Díaz was replaced as general secretary by Dolores Ibárruri.

José Díaz was initially buried in Tbilisi's Vera Cemetery, where a tomb monument authored by the Georgian sculptor Moris Talakvadze was installed. The statue disappeared in the early 1990s and only a tombstone has survived. In April 2005, José Díaz's remains were reburied in Seville, and the PCE honored his memory with a ceremonial; the city's Ayuntamiento unanimously voted to designate him Hijo predilecto ("Favorite son").

His surname became a popular given name in the USSR.

== Sources ==
- Alexander, Robert J. (1999). The Anarchists in the Spanish Civil War. Janus Publishing Company Lim. ISBN 978-1-85756-400-6.
- Braunthal, Julius. (1967). History of the International, vol. 2, tr. Henry Collins and Kenneth Mitchell. London: Praeger.
- Carr, E.H. (1982). The Twilight of the Comintern, 1930-1935. London: Pantheon Books.
- Chase, William J. (2001). Prof. Hist. Univ. Pittsburg : Enemies within the Gates? The Comintern and the Stalinist Repression, 1934–1939. New Haven, CT: Yale University Press. See particularly, 72 translated documents covering the period 1935 – 1941, : https://web.archive.org/web/20120527012654/http://www.yale.edu/annals/Chase/Documents/list_of_documents.htm
- Dallin, Alexander and Firsov, F. I. eds., Dimitrov and Stalin : 1934–1943 : letters from the Soviet archives ;(2000), Yale Univ. Press, New Haven And London, Russian documents translated by Vadim A. Staklo. p. cm. — (Annals of communism) Includes bibliographical references and index. ISBN 0-300-08021-2 (alk. paper)
- Degras, Jane T., ed. (1956–1965). The Communist International, 1919–1943: Documents. 3 vols. London: Oxford University Press.
- Geoff Eley, Prof. of History at the Univ. of Michigan, Forging Democracy: The History of the Left in Europe, 1850–2000, Oxford University Press (2002), paperback, 720 pages, ISBN 0-19-504479-7, ISBN 978-0-19-504479-9
- Kahan, Vilém, ed. (1990). Bibliography of the Communist International (1919–1979). Leiden: E. J. Brill Academic eds. Leyden and New York, 400 pages, ISBN 90-04-09320-6
- Kahan Vilém, The Communist International, 1919–1943: the Personnel of its Highest Bodies, 352 pages, London: I B Tauris, (2002), ISBN 1-86064-747-2
- McDermott, Kevin, and Agnew, Jeremy. (1997). The Comintern: A History of International Communism from Lenin to Stalin. XXV + 304 pages, 978-0312162771 New York: St. Martin's Press.
- Lazitch, Branko, French speaking Serbian historian and political journalist, (1923–1998), specialist in Soviet History and the International Communist, Biographical Dictionary of the Comintern, (Stanford: Hoover Institution Press, 1973)
- Salas Larrazábal, Ramón, (1916–1993). Historia General De La Guerra De Espana, ISBN 84-321-2340-4, Hardcover, Edit. Rialp, (Madrid).

Preceded by José Bullejos	General Secretary of the Communist Party of Spain; 1932–1942	Succeeded by Dolores Ibárruri
