= Antonio García Quejido =

Spanish Communist politician and trade unionist

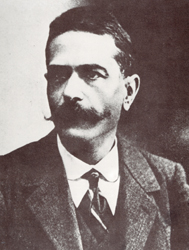
- Antonio García Quejido in 1895

General Secretary of the Communist Party of Spain
- In office 15 March 1922 – 8 July 1923
- Preceded by: Office established
- Succeeded by: César Rodríguez González

President of the Unión General de Trabajadores
- In office 1888–1892
- Preceded by: Office created

Member of Madrid City Council
- In office 1909–1913

Personal details
- Born: 16 February 1856 Madrid, Spain
- Died: 13 June 1927 (aged 71) Madrid, Spain
- Resting place: Madrid Civil Cemetery, Madrid, Spain
- Party: Spanish Socialist Workers' Party Spanish Communist Workers' Party Communist Party of Spain
- Other political affiliations: Unión General de Trabajadores
- Occupation: Politician, trade unionist, journalist

Antonio García Quejido (16 February 1856 – 13 June 1927) was a Spanish politician, trade unionist, the first president of the Unión General de Trabajadores (UGT) and the first general secretary of the Communist Party of Spain (PCE).

== Biography ==
Antonio García Quejido was born in Madrid and was a typographer by profession. From a young age he was a member of the Marxist circle in Madrid led by Pablo Iglesias named Nueva Federación Madrileña, which was a predecessor of the Spanish Socialist Workers' Party. He became one of the leaders of the party and represented the PSOE in multiple congresses of the Second International.

In 1888, he participated in the founding of the General Union of Workers (UGT), of which he was elected president. Between 1894 and 1905 he held the position of general secretary of the union center. In 1897 he was elected secretary of the national committee of the PSOE, although he left the leadership of the UGT when his proposal for an alliance with the bourgeois republicans was turned down. He was reinstated as secretary general of the UGT from 1899 to 1902.

In 1901 he edited the first volume of Kapital, by Karl Marx in Spanish. García Queido was the Socialist candidate in numerous elections, in 1909 he was elected councilor of the Madrid City Council. From then on he opposed the alliance with the Republicans. In 1912 he was appointed director of El Socialista, the official newspaper of the PSOE.

After the outbreak of World War I, he was against both imperialist sides, unlike the Allied positions of the majority of the PSOE leaders. When the Russian Revolution broke out in 1917, he was one of the socialist leaders who supported the entry of the PSOE into the Third International, a position who took favor of within the Party until 1921, when the split that gave rise to the Spanish Communist Workers' Party (PCOE), of which he was the founder; and later to the Communist Party of Spain (PCE), of which he was elected its first general secretary.

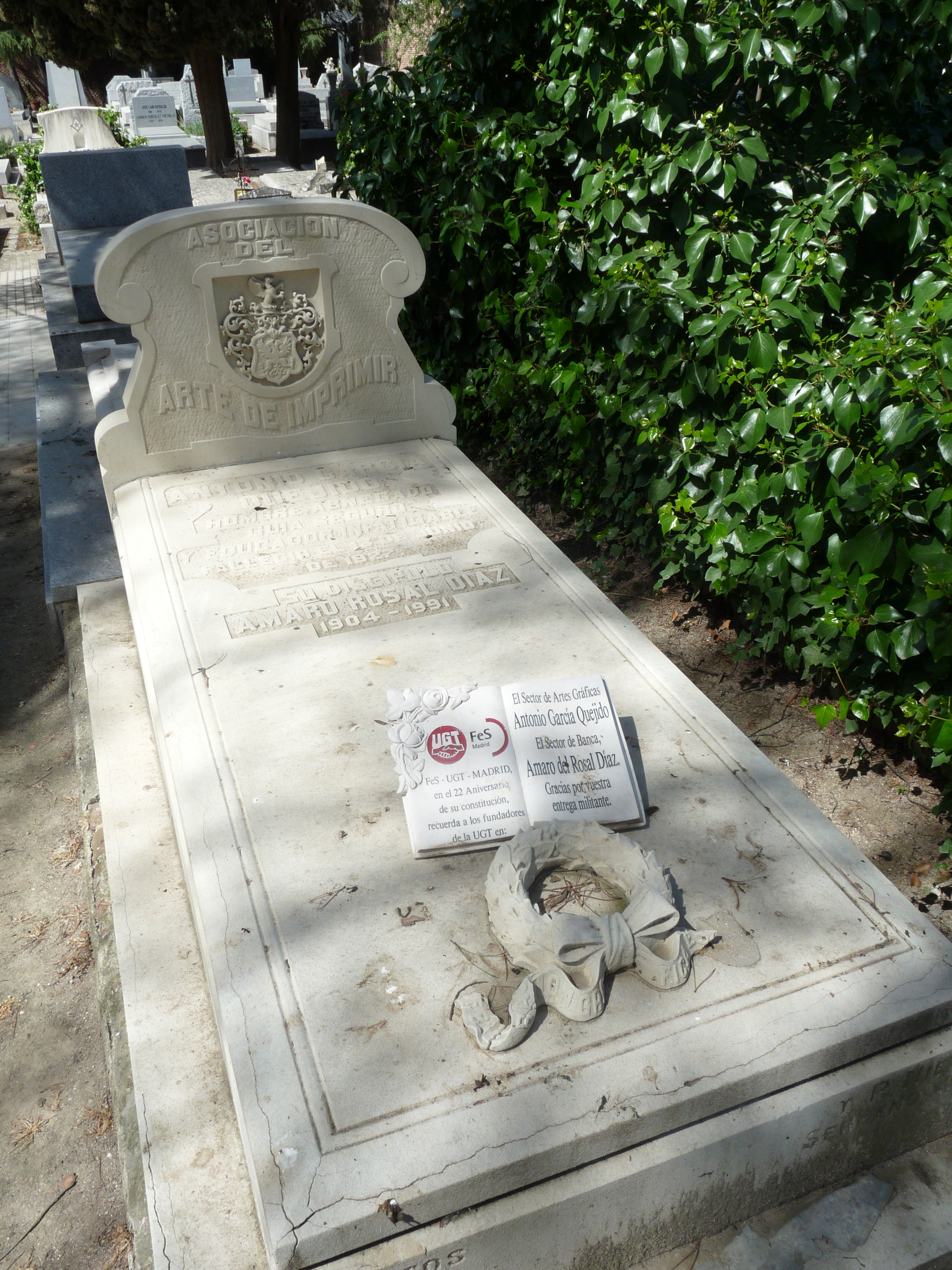
Tomb of García Quejido in the civil cemetery of Madrid

After the 1923 general election, he resigned as general secretary and did not hold any significant posts after his resignation. García Quejido died on 13 June 1927, at the age of seventy one in Madrid.
