= El Socialista Manchego =

Spanish newspaper

- Type: Weekly newspaper
- Founded: 1932
- Ceased publication: 1938
- City: Alcázar de Cervantes
- Country: Spain

El Socialista Manchego was a weekly newspaper published from Alcázar de Cervantes, Spain from 1932 to 1938. It was published by the local branches of Spanish Socialist Workers' Party and Unión General de Trabajadores. Amongst the directors of El Socialista Manchego were Teodoro Vizcaino, Manuel Andújar Vela and Francisco Fernández. El Socialista Manchego disappeared in late 1938.
