= El Socialista (newspaper) =

Socialist newspaper in Madrid, Spain

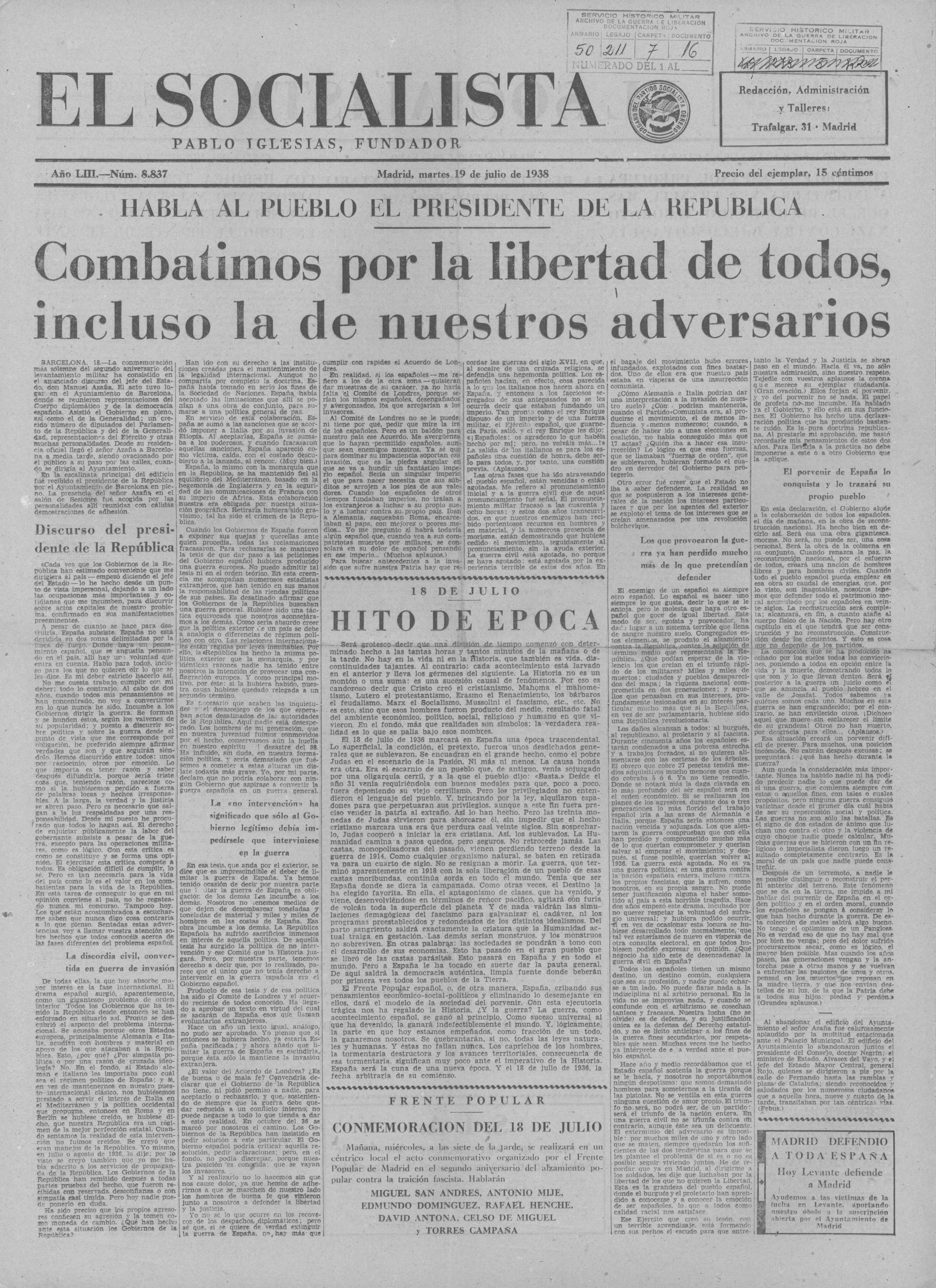
- Front page dated 18 July 1938
- Type: Monthly newspaper
- Owner: Spanish Socialist Workers' Party
- Founder: Pablo Iglesias
- Founded: 12 March 1886; 140 years ago
- Political alignment: Socialist
- Language: Spanish
- Headquarters: Madrid
- Country: Spain
- ISSN: 0210-4725
- Website: elsocialista.es

El Socialista is a socialist newspaper published in Madrid, Spain. The paper is the organ of the Spanish Socialist Workers' Party (PSOE).

== History and profile ==
El Socialista was established by Pablo Iglesias, founder of the PSOE, in Madrid, and the first issue appeared on 12 March 1886. The paper is owned and published by the PSOE and its union, Union General de Trabajadores (UGT). The headquarters of the paper is in Madrid.

It was started as a two-page publication. In 1913 the paper began to be published daily. In December 1935 the control of the paper was taken by the centrist group within the PSOE led by Indalecio Prieto as a result of the resignation of Francisco Largo Caballero from the presidency of the party.

El Socialista was published weekly in the early 1970s. The paper was closed during the rule of Francisco Franco. However, El Socialista continued its publication clandestinely in that period. In 1978 it resumed its regular publication.

The paper is currently published monthly, while its online edition is active every day.

== Contributors and editors ==
Miguel Unamuno and Santiago Carrillo were among the early contributors. The paper was first directed by its founder Pablo Iglesias who held the post until 1913 when Mariano García Cortes began to edit it. In 1914 Eduardo Torralba Beci was appointed editor-in-chief of El Socialista, replacing Cortes in the post. Torralba served in the post for one year, and Pablo Iglesias retook the paper and edited it until his death in 1925.

Enrique Angulo, son-in-law of the socialist politician Ramón Lamoneda, also served as the director of the paper. Another director was Andrés Saborit. In the mid-1930s the editor was Julián Zugazagoitia.

== Content and circulation ==
El Socialista did not show enthusiasm about the communist revolution in Russia in 1917. It even argued that the revolution was a departure from the significant obligation of Russia to defeat the German Empire. The first supportive article about the revolution appeared in March 1918. In the early 1930s El Socialista criticized the New Deal economic program of the United States. With the rise of conservatism in Spain from 1933 the paper became one of the opposition publications criticizing the government. Immediately after World War II El Socialista adopted an anti-Communist political stance and reported the political tenets of the PSOE. In the 1940s and 1950s it supported the Zionist cause and was an ardent critic of the Arabs who were portrayed in a negative manner. It also considered Egypt as "a miserable country."

In 1949 El Socialista sold only 8,000 copies.
