= Communist Party of Spain =

Political party in Spain

Communist Party of Spain Partido Comunista de España
- Abbreviation: PCE
- President: José Luis Centella
- General Secretary: Enrique Santiago
- Honorary President: Dolores Ibárruri (eternal title)
- Founded: 14 November 1921; 104 years ago
- Merger of: Spanish Communist Party; Spanish Communist Workers' Party
- Headquarters: C/Olimpo, 35; 28043 Madrid
- Newspaper: Mundo Obrero; Nuestra Bandera
- Youth wing: Communist Youth Union of Spain (UJCE)
- Women's wing: Movimiento Democrático de Mujeres (MDM)
- Trade union: Workers' Commissions (CCOO)
- Membership (2022): 7,713
- Ideology: Communism; Marxism–Leninism (until 1978; since 2017); Feminism; Republicanism; Internationalism; Federalism; Historical: Eurocommunism (1978–2017)
- Political position: Far-left (Note: Although certain media outlets and parties describe the PCE as far left, its renunciation of the revolutionary path and its acceptance of parliamentarism and liberal democracy as means to achieve government exempt them from the most common definitions of that position.)
- National affiliation: Popular Front (1936–1939); United Left (1986–present)
- European affiliation: Party of the European Left
- International affiliation: IMCWP; IPA
- Colours: Red
- Congress of Deputies: 5 / 350 Inside Sumar
- Senate: 0 / 266
- European Parliament: 0 / 61

Website
- pce.es

The Communist Party of Spain (Spanish: Partido Comunista de España, PCE) is a political party in Spain that is part of the United Left coalition, which is currently also part of the electoral alliance Sumar. Two of its politicians are ministers in the current government of Pedro Sánchez: Yolanda Díaz (Minister of Labour and Social Economy), and Sira Rego (Minister of Youth and Children).

The PCE was founded by 1921, after a split in the Spanish Socialist Workers' Party (Spanish: Partido Socialista Obrero Español, PSOE). The PCE was founded by those who opposed the social democratic wing of the PSOE, because the social democrat wing did not support the PSOE's integration in the Communist International founded by Vladimir Lenin two years prior. The PCE was a merger of the Spanish Communist Party and the Spanish Communist Workers' Party. The PCE was first legalized after the proclamation of the Second Spanish Republic in April 1931. The republic was the first democratic regime in the history of Spain. The PCE gained much support in the months before the Spanish coup of July 1936, which marked the beginning of the Spanish Civil War, and it was a major force during the war as well. The Republicans lost, and Franco established a military dictatorship, under which the PCE was one of the most heavily repressed parties, with specific laws banning communist parties, among others.

Under the dictatorship, the PCE was the main opposition to the Francoist dictatorship. In the early years of the dictatorship, many PCE members joined the Spanish Maquis, a group of guerrillas who fought against the regime. Years later, the Maquis' power declined, and the PCE abandoned the military strategy. Instead, it chose to interfere in the only legal trade union in Spain (which was part of the Francoist apparatus), the Vertical Syndicate.

Franco died on 20 November 1975, and two days later, Juan Carlos I was crowned. Juan Carlos I would lead the Spanish transition to liberal democracy, a time when the PCE became also extremely relevant, due to Franco's anti-communist legacy. Prime Minister Adolfo Suárez legalized the PCE on 9 April 1977, a decision which was particularly controversial, but ended peacefully. The PCE largely contributed to the restoration of liberal democracy in Spain during the lead of Secretary-General Santiago Carrillo.

Since 1986, it is part of the United Left coalition. The statutes of the PCE state that its goals are to "democratically participate in a revolutionary transformation of society and its political structures, overcoming the capitalist system and constructing socialism in the Spanish State, as a contribution to the transition to socialism worldwide, with our goals set in the realization of the emancipating ideal of communism". It defines itself as revolutionary, internationalist, solidarity, republican, feminist, and secularist, specifically, of the laïcité variety.

The youth organization of PCE is the Communist Youth Union of Spain. PCE publishes Mundo Obrero (Workers World) monthly.

== History ==
=== Establishment and pre-republican era ===
The PCE was the result of a merger between two organizations: the original Spanish Communist Party (Partido Comunista Español or PCE) and the Spanish Communist Workers' Party (Partido Comunista Obrero Español or PCOE). The former was created in April 1920 from portions of the Socialists' youth organization (Federación de Juventudes Socialistas or FJS) while the latter had been formed from a union of dissident Socialists (terceristas) and members of the General Union of Workers (Unión General de Trabajadores or UGT) who regarded the original PCE as not properly representative of the working class.

The two parties joined in the new Partido Comunista de España on 14 November 1921. The unified PCE became a member of the Third International and held its first congress in Sevilla in March 1922. In May, Jules Humbert-Droz, the top Comintern official in Western Europe, arrived in Spain to supervise the still fractious party and would continue to do so until the establishment of the republic.

By the end of 1922, the party had approximately 5,000 members. The PCE's left-wing engaged in political violence, especially in Bilbao, largely directed against other leftists. A party leader's bodyguard shot and killed a Socialist in November 1922 and organized party militants attempted a general strike in August 1923 that ended in a shootout at the barricaded party headquarters, resulting in twenty communists dead or injured and another seventy arrested.

With the advent of the dictatorship of Miguel Primo de Rivera in September 1923, political parties, including the PCE, were repressed and rendered largely powerless though not dissolved. The party continued to publish its weekly newspaper La Antorcha until 1927. In November 1925, PCE leaders joined with Comintern officials and leaders of the Catalan-separatist Estat Català in endorsing a revolutionary program calling for the following:

- Abolition of Primo de Rivera's dictatorship and of the monarchy,
- Creation of a república federativa popular (federal popular republic),
- Recognition of independence for Catalonia, the Basque Country, and Morocco,
- Total freedom of association,
- Expropriation of large estates and distribution of land to peasants,
- Organization of workers' councils in industry,
- Formation of a central committee for revolution consisting of representatives from several parties as well as a military committee, and
- A planned insurrection in Madrid.

However, Moscow urged a cautious approach, and the CNT and Basque nationalists were reluctant to cooperate with communists, so the plans were never carried out. The PCE continued to suffer from repression and dissension. The party's second secretary general, José Bullejos, purged the party of politically suspect members, and was himself arrested in 1928. In 1930, the arguments over doctrine led the Catalan-Balearic Communist Federation (FCCB) to break from the party and associate with the International Right Opposition. Amid this infighting, Comintern official Dmitry Manuilsky reportedly stated that, while Spain had "an excellent proletariat", it had only "a few little groups, but not a communist party".

Thus, the PCE was in a very debilitated state when the Second Spanish Republic was proclaimed in 1931. On 3 December 1933, the first PCE parliamentarian, Cayetano Bolívar Escribano, was elected. Bolívar was jailed at the time of elections and left imprisonment to occupy his post in the parliament.

=== Popular Front and Civil War ===
Civil War poster: "Workers, peasants, soldiers, intellectuals: Reinforce the ranks of the Communist Party by Josep Renau

PCE was a small party during the initial years of the Republic, until it began to grow due to the victory of the Popular Front (of which the Communists had been a constituent part) in February 1936 and the beginning of the Spanish Civil War in July of that year. The PCE, directed by José Díaz and Dolores Ibárruri (known popularly as La Pasionaria), worked consistently for the victory of the Republican forces and the Popular Front government, but was wary of the social revolution that was being waged by Spanish workers.

The PCE leadership judged that while progressive laws could be passed, an attempt at a full-scale socialist revolution would needlessly divide the forces of the Republic. It would cause massive conflict behind republican lines, thus diverting military forces from the battle against Franco and driving many democratic republicans who were prepared to fight against the rebels into the arms of the rebels.

Being a well-knit and highly disciplined organization, the PCE could in spite of its numerical weakness play an important part in the war. In the first five months of the war, PCE grew from 30,000 members to 100,000. It also founded a Spanish branch of the International Red Aid, which assisted the Republican cause considerably.

In 1936, due to the special political situation in Catalonia, Partit Comunista de Catalunya (the Catalan branch of PCE) was separated from the party to fuse with other socialists to form Partit Socialista Unificat de Catalunya. Since then the PCE does not have an organization in Catalonia, but relies on a regional referent party. This set-up has been imitated by many of the communist splinter groups in Spain.

The PCE clashed with anarchists in Barcelona during the May Days of 1937.

=== Resistance and reorientation ===
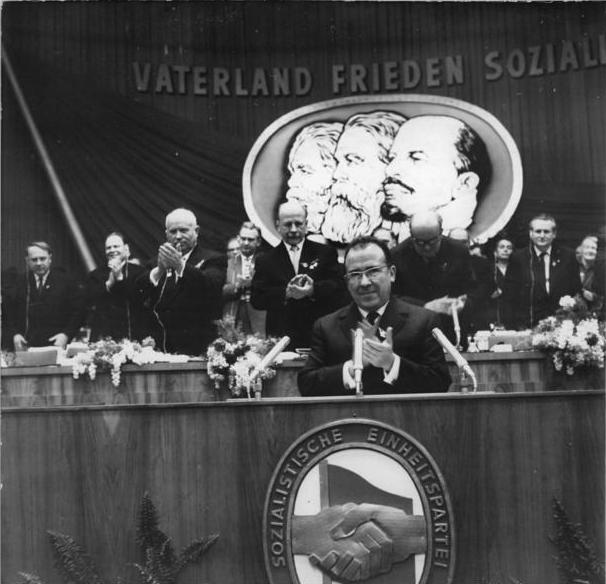
Santiago Carrillo in 1963 during the 6th party convention of the Socialist Unity Party of Germany.

After the Republican defeat in April 1939, the PCE was persecuted by the Nationales of caudillo Francisco Franco (1939–1975), although maintained the best organization among the opposition parties inside Spain. During the initial years of the Francoist State, PCE organized guerrilla struggles in some parts of the country.

A large part of the party membership was forced into exile. Some PCE members went to the Soviet Union and fought as volunteers for the Red Army during the Second World War, such as General Enrique Líster. A large section of PCE members were based in France, where a major party organization was set up, although the French government forced them to leave in 1950 during the rising ideological tension of the Cold War. During the latter half of the Franco years, PCE changed its strategy and started organizing Workers' Commissions (CC.OO.) within the official trade union apparatus. CC.OO. and PCE gained strength and became the backbone of the opposition forces in the country.

Dolores Ibárruri, "La Pasionaria", a dedicated follower of consequent Comintern policies, replaced Jose Diaz as General Secretary in 1944, and held the position until 1960. Santiago Carrillo was General Secretary from 1960 to 1982. In 1963, after the Communist Party of Spain abandoned the armed struggle, hard-line Communists, led by Julio Álvarez del Vayo, founded the Spanish National Liberation Front (FELN), a small splinter group.

Carrillo put the party on a eurocommunist course, distancing it from its Leninist origins. Carrillo accepted concessions to the "bourgeoisie", accepting the restoration of a liberal democracy and constitutional monarchy. This was regarded by many Party members as treason, for these concessions were made to classes the Party's doctrine called "exploiters".

Communists played a fundamental role in the 1962 miners' strike, the first large-scale social movement since the end of the civil war, by putting their informal networks at its service, but also by involving their exiled activists to organize international solidarity. At the peak of the mobilization, more than 60,000 workers stopped work. A first breach in the edifice of Franco's dictatorship, which had ruled the country for more than twenty years.

=== Transition to democracy ===
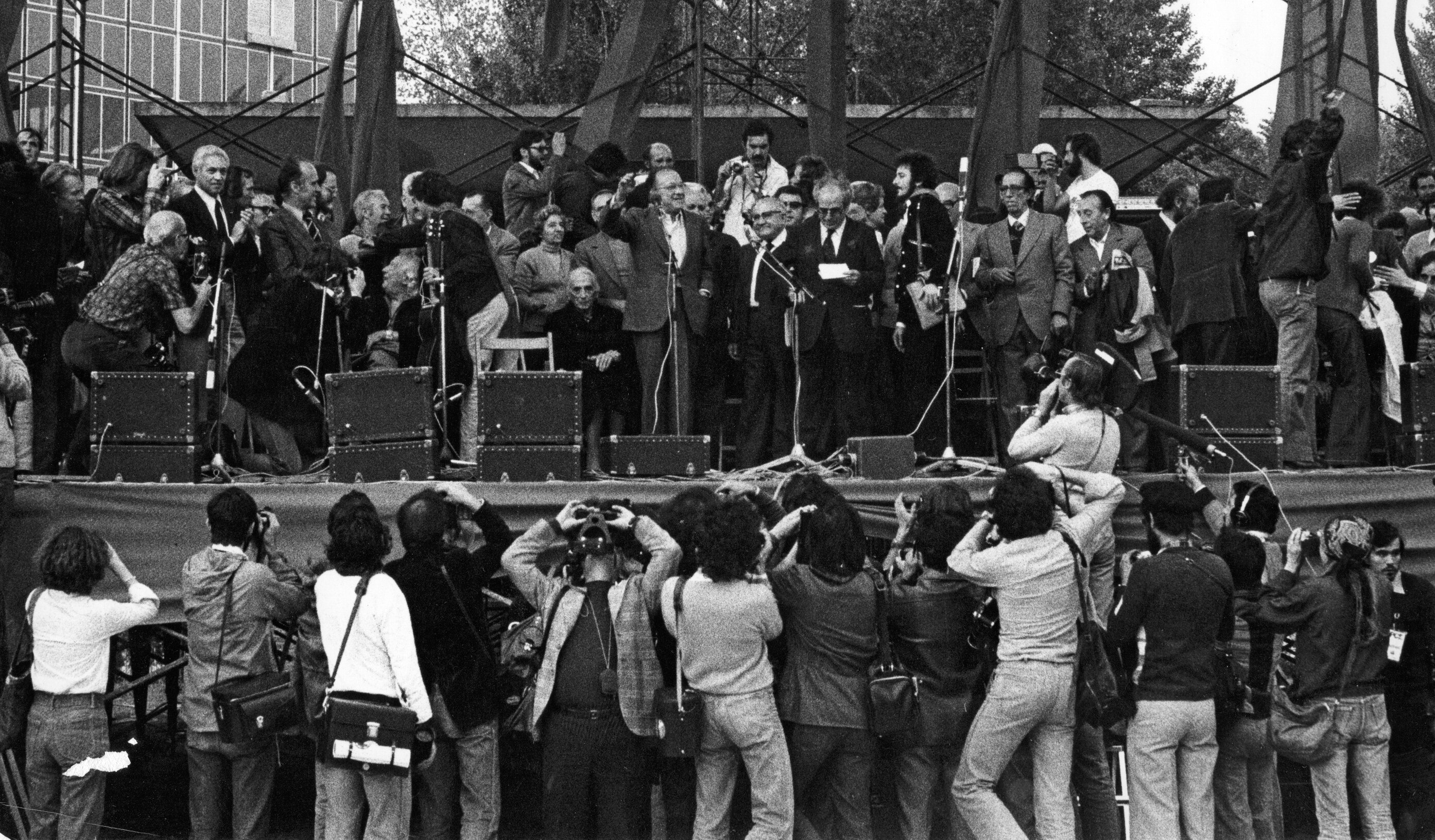
Party celebration in the Casa de Campo of Madrid.

The Party was legalized after the January 1977 Atocha massacre, on 9 April 1977, as one of the last steps in the Spanish transition to democracy. Only weeks after the legalization, PCE had over 200,000 card-holding members. But the concessions made by Carrillo (labelled "revisionist" by his orthodox communist opponents) and the social democratization of the party under his leadership provoked dissent amongst party ranks. Several party members left the party. Enrique Líster broke away in 1973 and formed the Partido Comunista Obrero Español. Other more radical left-wing groups that broke away were Partido Comunista de los Trabajadores (formed by the Left Opposition of PCE in 1977) and PCE (VIII-IX Congresos) (formed in 1971).

In the first elections after the transition in 1977, the PCE obtained 9% of the votes, and in 1979 it increased its vote share to 11%. By this time, however, the party had become increasingly divided into three currents. Carrillo's supporters were squeezed between, on the one hand, pro-Soviet communists who had remained within the party and felt his Eurocommunist course took the party too far on a social democratic path and, on the other hand, "renovators" who advocated for democratizing the party and opening it up towards more collaboration with other groups on the left. In the midst of successive waves of expulsions of members who belonged to the minority currents, the PCE suffered an electoral defeat in 1982, getting just 4% of the vote.

=== Divisions in the party, collaboration with other groups in the United Left ===
After the 1982 elections, Carrillo was removed as general secretary, and the new party leader Gerardo Iglesias pursued a strategy of leftist convergence and collaboration with non-communist parties and social movements. Over the objections of Carrillo, who was expelled in 1985 and went on to found a new party and warn that supporting IU was tantamount to "burying communism", the PCE developed the "United Left" alliance Izquierda Unida (IU). This broad coalition initially encompassed parties ranging from the pro-Soviet PCPE to the socialist PASOC, the Progressive Federation, and the Carlist Party.

Despite its role in the anti-NATO protests of 1986, IU fared weakly in the 1986 elections, and by 1988, the Communist Party elected Julio Anguita as new General Secretary, which he remained until 1998. Under Anguita, the party took a turn towards the left and fundamental opposition to both PSOE and PP, and many of the members who had previously been expelled for pro-Soviet views returned to the party. By 1991, the party had 70,000 members, and IU rebounded in the 1989 elections, winning 9.1% of the vote that year and slightly increasing it to 9.6% in 1993 and 10.5% in 1996.

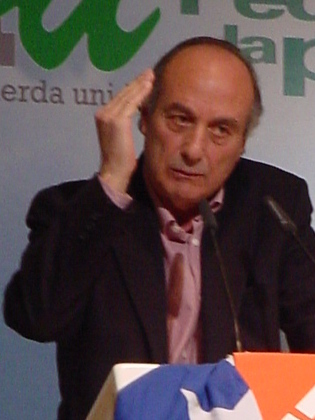
Paco Frutos in 2005

Notably, PSUC, the Catalan referent of PCE, did not reverse its eurocommunist course in the late 1980s, as the PCE had done, and gradually, PSUC and PCE grew apart. Finally, PSUC decided to dissolve itself into Iniciativa per Catalunya, and cease to function as a communist party. This provoked a 45% minority to break away and form PSUC viu (Living PSUC). Since 1998, PSUC viu (United and Alternative Left) is the referent of PCE in Catalonia.

In 2008 the party was referred to as left-wing by various academic political writers. After the 2008 election, Llamazares resigned as IU coordinator, and later that year, PCE politician Cayo Lara was elected to replace him on the platform "For an anti-capitalist, republican, federal, and alternative United Left". IU shifted back towards a more confrontational attitude towards the PSOE, and José Luis Centella succeeded Frutos as PCE general secretary the next year. For the 2015 elections, IU joined up with further partners in the Popular Unity (UP) alliance, led by PCE politician Alberto Garzón. It received 4% of the vote, and was eclipsed by the new left-wing party Podemos. UP subsequently joined with Podemos in the Unidos Podemos alliance, which received 21% of the vote in the 2016 election. The PCE, meanwhile, moved in its XX Congress in 2017 to explicitly embrace Marxism–Leninism again, marking a break with the previous forty years. After breaking with Podemos in 2023, both IU and the PCE joined Sumar whose leader, Yolanda Díaz, has been member of the communist party since 1986. As of 2026, the PCE has five seats at the Congress of Deputies.

== List of secretaries-general ==
| Year | Name | Time in office |
|---|---|---|
| 1921 | Antonio García Quejido | 1921–1923 |
| 1923 | César Rodríguez González | 1923–1925 |
| 1925 | José Bullejos | 1925–1932 |
| 1932 | José Díaz | 1932–1942 |
| 1942 | Dolores Ibárruri | 1942–1960 |
| 1960 | Santiago Carrillo | 1960–1982 |
| 1982 | Gerardo Iglesias | 1982–1988 |
| 1988 | Julio Anguita | 1988–1998 |
| 1998 | Francisco Frutos | 1998–2009 |
| 2009 | José Luis Centella | 2009–2017 |
| 2017 | Vacant (Provisional Committee) | 2017–2018 |
| 2018 | Enrique Santiago | 2018–present |

== Federations of the PCE ==
The PCE consists of 15 federations:

- Communist Party of Andalusia
- Communist Party of Aragon
- Communist Party of Asturias
- Communist Party of the Balearic Islands
- Communist Party of the Canaries
- Communist Party of Cantabria
- Communist Party of Castile-La Mancha
- Communist Party of Castile-León
- Communist Party of the Basque Country
- Communist Party of Extremadura
- Communist Party of Galicia
- Communist Party of Madrid
- Communist Party of the Region of Murcia
- Communist Party of La Rioja
- Communist Party of the Valencian Country

PSUC viu participates in PCE congresses, etc., as a PCE federation.

== Electoral performance ==
=== Second Spanish Republic ===
Cortes republicanas
| Election | Leading candidate | Coalition | % | Seats | +/– | Government |
| 1931 | José Bullejos | None | 0.8 (#21) | 0 / 470 | New | Opposition |
| 1933 | José Díaz Ramos | None | 1.9 (#14) | 1 / 472 | 1 | Opposition |
| 1936 | José Díaz Ramos | Popular Front | 2.5 (#13) | 17 / 473 | 16 | Confidence and supply (1936) |
| 1936 | José Díaz Ramos | Popular Front | 2.5 (#13) | 17 / 473 | 16 | Coalition (1936–1938) |

=== Cortes Generales ===
Cortes Generales
| Election | Leading candidate | Congress | | | Senate | | | Gov. |
| Election | Leading candidate | Votes | % | Seats | Votes | % | Seats | Gov. |
| 1977 | Santiago Carrillo | 1,709,890 | 9.3 (#3) | 20 / 350 | 1,014,272 | 2.0 (#10) | 0 / 207 | No |
| 1979 | Santiago Carrillo | 1,938,487 | 10.8 (#3) | 23 / 350 | 4,407,905 | 8.8 (#3) | 0 / 208 | No |
| 1982 | Santiago Carrillo | 865,272 | 4.1 (#4) | 4 / 350 | 2,687,352 | 4.6 (#4) | 0 / 208 | No |
| 1986 | Gerardo Iglesias | Within IU | | 4 / 350 | Within IU | | 0 / 208 | No |
| 1989 | Julio Anguita | Within IU | | 13 / 350 | Within IU | | 1 / 208 | No |
| 1993 | Julio Anguita | Within IU | | 13 / 350 | Within IU | | 0 / 208 | No |
| 1996 | Julio Anguita | Within IU | | 14 / 350 | Within IU | | 0 / 208 | No |
| 2000 | Francisco Frutos | Within IU | | 8 / 350 | Within IU | | 0 / 208 | No |
| 2004 | Gaspar Llamazares | Within IU | | 3 / 350 | Within IU | | 0 / 208 | (Note: Confidence and supply.) |
| 2008 | Gaspar Llamazares | Within IU | | 1 / 350 | Within IU | | 0 / 208 | No |
| 2011 | Cayo Lara | Within IU–LV | | 5 / 350 | Within IU–LV | | 0 / 208 | No |
| 2015 | Alberto Garzón | Within IU–UPeC | | 1 / 350 | Within IU–UPeC | | 0 / 208 | — |
| 2016 | Pablo Iglesias | Within Unidos Podemos | | 5 / 350 | Within Unidos Podemos | | 1 / 208 | No (Note: 2016–2018.) |
| 2016 | Pablo Iglesias | Within Unidos Podemos | | 5 / 350 | Within Unidos Podemos | | 1 / 208 | (Note: Confidence and supply (2018–2019).) |
| Apr. 2019 | Pablo Iglesias | Within Unidas Podemos | | 4 / 350 | Within Unidas Podemos | | 0 / 208 | — |
| Nov. 2019 | Pablo Iglesias | Within Unidas Podemos | | 5 / 350 | Within Unidas Podemos | | 0 / 208 | Yes |
| 2023 | Yolanda Díaz | Within Sumar | | 5 / 350 | Within Sumar | | 0 / 208 | Yes |

=== European Parliament ===
European Parliament
| Election | Leading candidate | Votes | % | Seats | EP Group |
| 1987 | Fernando Pérez Royo | Within IU | | 1 / 60 | COM |
| 1989 | Fernando Pérez Royo | Within IU | | 2 / 60 | EUL |
| 1994 | Alonso Puerta | Within IU | | 7 / 64 | EUL |
| 1999 | Alonso Puerta | Within IU–EUiA | | 3 / 64 | GUE/NGL |
| 2004 | Willy Meyer | Within IU–ICV–EUiA | | 1 / 54 | GUE/NGL |
| 2009 | Willy Meyer | Within IU | | 1 / 54 | GUE/NGL |
| 2014 | Willy Meyer | Within IP | | 3 / 54 | GUE/NGL |
| 2019 | María Eugenia Rodríguez Palop | Within Unidas Podemos | | 2 / 59 | GUE/NGL |
| 2024 | Estrella Galán | Within Sumar | | 0 / 61 | — |

== See also ==
- Valentín González
- Juan Modesto
- Jorge Semprún
- Marcelino Camacho
- Antifascist Worker and Peasant Militias (MAOC)
