= Spanish Communist Workers' Party (1921) =

- Founded: 13 April 1921
- Dissolved: 14 November 1921
- Split from: Spanish Socialist Workers' Party
- Merged into: Spanish Communist Party
- Ideology: Communism; Marxism
- Political position: Far-left

The Spanish Communist Workers' Party (Partido Comunista Obrero Español) was a communist party founded on April 13, 1921 by the terceristas, including Virginia González Polo, Daniel Anguiano, Eduardo Torralba Beci, Manuel Núñez Arenas, Facundo Perezagua, Luis Mancebo, Isidoro Acevedo and Evaristo Gil, who had been trying to persuade the Spanish Socialist Workers' Party (PSOE) to join the Third International. When the PSOE Congress voted to join the Vienna International and refused Bolshevism, the terceristas broke away.

A new Communist Party of Spain was founded on November 14, 1921 through an act of merger of Partido Comunista Español and Partido Comunista Obrero Español. The unified PCE soon adhered to the Comintern.
