= Pablo Iglesias Posse =

Spanish politician and labour leader

Pablo Iglesias
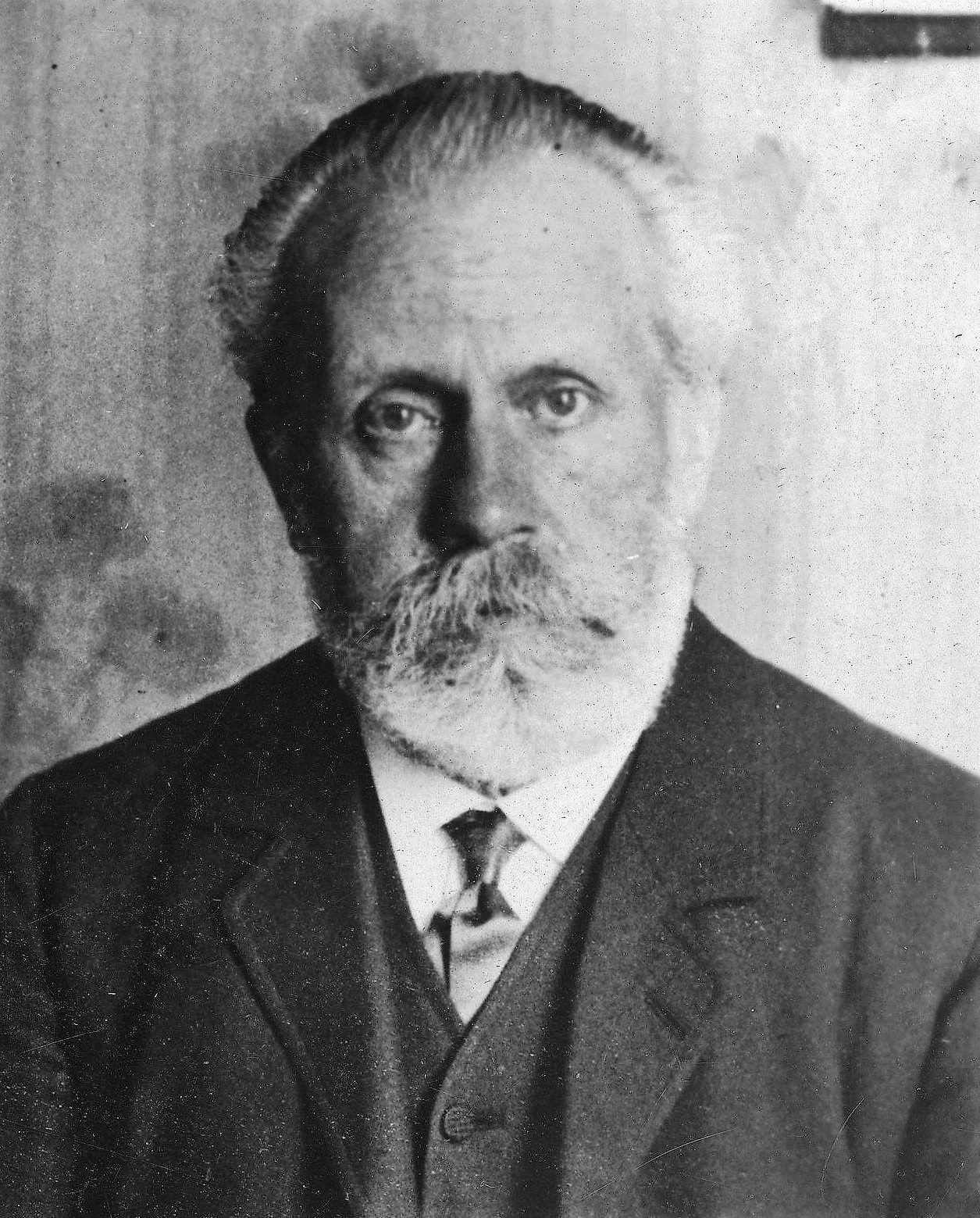
- Iglesias, c. 1920-1925

President of the Spanish Socialist Workers' Party
- In office 25 August 1888 – 8 December 1925
- Preceded by: Office created
- Succeeded by: Julián Besteiro

Member of the Congress of Deputies
- In office 10 June 1910 – 15 September 1923
- Constituency: Madrid

Member of Madrid City Council
- In office 1906–1910

Personal details
- Born: Paulino Iglesias Posse; 18 October 1850 Ferrol, Galicia, Spain
- Died: 9 December 1925 (aged 75) Madrid, Spain
- Resting place: Madrid Civil Cemetery, Madrid, Spain
- Party: Spanish Socialist Workers' Party
- Other political affiliations: Nueva Federación Madrileña; Conjunción Republicano-Socialista
- Spouse: Amparo Meliá (m. 1921)
- Children: Juan Almela Meliá (stepson)
- Occupation: Typesetter, Syndicalist
- Website: Pablo Iglesias Foundation

Pablo Iglesias Posse (17 October 1850 – 9 December 1925) was a Spanish socialist and Marxist labour leader. He is regarded as the father of Spanish socialism, having founded the Spanish Socialist Workers' Party (PSOE) in 1879 and the Spanish General Workers' Union (UGT) in 1888.

== Biography ==
Iglesias was born in Ferrol son to Pedro Iglesias and Juana, humble parents who called him Paulino. He attended school between the ages of six and nine, when his father, a municipal laborer, died. Manuel, his younger brother, and their mother put their possessions in a small covered cart and walked with it to live in Madrid. Pablo's mother survived there by begging, and both boys entered the Hospicio of San Fernando. They completed primary schooling there, and Pablo learned printing. Aged twelve he left the Hospicio to work and to help support his mother. He worked as a printer, gradually improving his wages. While he was rendered unemployed by a strike, his brother died of tuberculosis.

He attended evening classes and learned French. This let him read classic works of French political science, translate the works of French socialists and participate successfully in international congresses. Protected by the 1869 Constitution, the Spanish section of the International Workingmen's Association (AIT) organized a series of conferences in Madrid. Iglesias attended, and in 1870, was invited to enter the printers section. The appearance of Solidarity, newspaper of the International, started him on the intense journalistic career that occupied the rest of his life.

Iglesias in 1873 applied to join the Association of Art Printers and the following year was chosen as its president. From this platform he began several years of secret work preparing to start the world's second workers party. On 22 May 1879, at a renowned clandestine banquet of international brotherhood in Madrid, twenty-five people (led by Iglesias) founded the Spanish Socialist Workers Party (PSOE - Partido Socialista Obrero Español).

Political activism repeatedly put Iglesias in jail, first in 1882 after a strike and the last time in 1910 when he was sixty. He always rejected offers of clemency, and as an ex-convict some employers would deny him work. More than once, only the newspaper The Socialist he had founded on 12 March 1886, and his wage as its printer, editor and director, kept him from starving.

On 12 August 1888 the Spanish General Workers Union (UGT) was founded in Barcelona, its name proposed by Iglesias.

The Congress of 1889 named him president of its national committee, a position he held for 36 years until his death. In 1890, when the day of struggle was celebrated for the first time in Madrid on 1 May, he headed a demonstration. He led the representation to the Government of demands for legislative reforms, such as the 8-hour working day. In 1905 he first joined the City Council of Madrid.

Republicans had opposed Iglesias, but a Republican-Socialist alliance paved the way for the 1910 elections to make him the first socialist deputy in the Spanish Parliament. Worsening health prevented him attending many parliamentary sessions after 1914, limiting his parliamentary career. 1923 saw him elected a deputy for the last time.

Despite his sparse theoretical background, he produced many intellectual works in Spain and internationally. He published more than two thousand newspaper articles in Spain between his first, The War, on 5 December 1870 in Solidarity, and the last, The Working Class Will Win in Freedom on 5 December 1925.

Iglesias was a propagandist among Spanish socialists. Characterized by vigorous defense and furious attack, his works argue for an ethical call for regeneration and hope.

On his death, an office drawer contained a parting gift of 1,000 pesetas from Iglesias for The Socialist, to which he had been linked from its birth. There were widespread posthumous tributes to him. With Government authorization, more than 150,000 workers accompanied his funeral procession to the civil cemetery in Madrid.

The Spanish liberal philosopher José Ortega y Gasset praised him as a "secular saint". In For Whom the Bell Tolls, Ernest Hemingway wrote, "God pity the Spanish people. Any leader they have will muck them. One good man, Pablo Iglesias, in two thousand years...." (Chapt. 35).

Party political offices
Preceded by Office created	Secretary-General of the Spanish Socialist Workers' Party; 1879–1888	Succeeded by Francisco Diego
Preceded by Office created	President of the Spanish Socialist Workers' Party; 1888–1925	Succeeded by Julián Besteiro
Trade union offices
Preceded by Luis Zurdo	President of the UGT; 1889–1925	Succeeded by Julián Besteiro
