= Unión General de Trabajadores =

Spanish trade union

UGT
- Workers' General Union
- Unión General de Trabajadores
- Founded: 12 August 1888 (138)
- Headquarters: Madrid, Spain
- Location: Spain
- Members: 960,000 members (2017). 86,530 union representatives.
- Founder: Pablo Iglesias Posse
- Key people: Pepe Álvarez, general secretary
- Affiliations: Spanish Socialist Workers' Party; International Trade Union Confederation; European Trade Union Confederation
- Website: www.ugt.es

The Unión General de Trabajadores (UGT, General Union of Workers) is a major Spanish trade union, historically affiliated with the Spanish Socialist Workers' Party (PSOE).

== History ==
The UGT was founded 12 August 1888 by Pablo Iglesias Posse in Mataró (Barcelona), with Marxist socialism as its ideological basis, despite its statutory apolitical status. Until its nineteenth Congress in 1920, it did not consider class struggle as a basic principle of trade union action. The UGT was closely associated with the PSOE.

During the World War I era, the UGT followed a tactical line of close relationships and unity of action with the Confederación Nacional del Trabajo (CNT, National Labour Confederation). The UGT grew rapidly after 1917, and by 1920 had 200,000 members. This era came to a sudden end with the advent of the dictatorship of Miguel Primo de Rivera, who gave a legal monopoly on labor organizing to his own government-sponsored union, the Patriotic Union. While the CNT opted for a radical confrontation with the regime and were prohibited on this account, the UGT, although in disagreement with the dictatorship, adopted a collaborative attitude in order to continue to operate legally. The UGT grew from 277,011 in December 1930, to 958,451 in December 1931, to 1,041,539 in June 1932. Much of this growth occurred in its land workers' federation, the Federación Nacional de Trabajadores de la Tierra (FNTT), which grew from 36,639 in June 1930 to 392,953 in June 1932, raising the proportion of land workers in the UGT from 13 percent to 37 percent. The influx of these workers (jornaleros) caused the union's radicalisation, and the bloody breakout of the Spanish Civil War deepened the internal fissures that resulted in the departure of Largo Caballero from the position of UGT secretary general in 1937.

General Francisco Franco confined the UGT to exile and clandestinity after his victory in the Spanish Civil War until his death in 1975. The Union emerged from secrecy during the democratic transition after Franco's death, as did the communist Workers' Commissions (Comisiones Obreras, CCOO). The UGT and CCOO, between them, constitute the major avenues for workers' representation in modern Spain, with the anarcho-syndicalist Confederación General del Trabajo (CGT) a distant third.

== Objectives ==
The UGT declares itself to be an institution of productive workers, organized along lines of trades and liberal professions, which respects freedom of thought, leading toward the transformation of the society, in order to establish it on the basis of social justice, equality and solidarity.

== Federations and foundations ==
=== Current affiliates ===
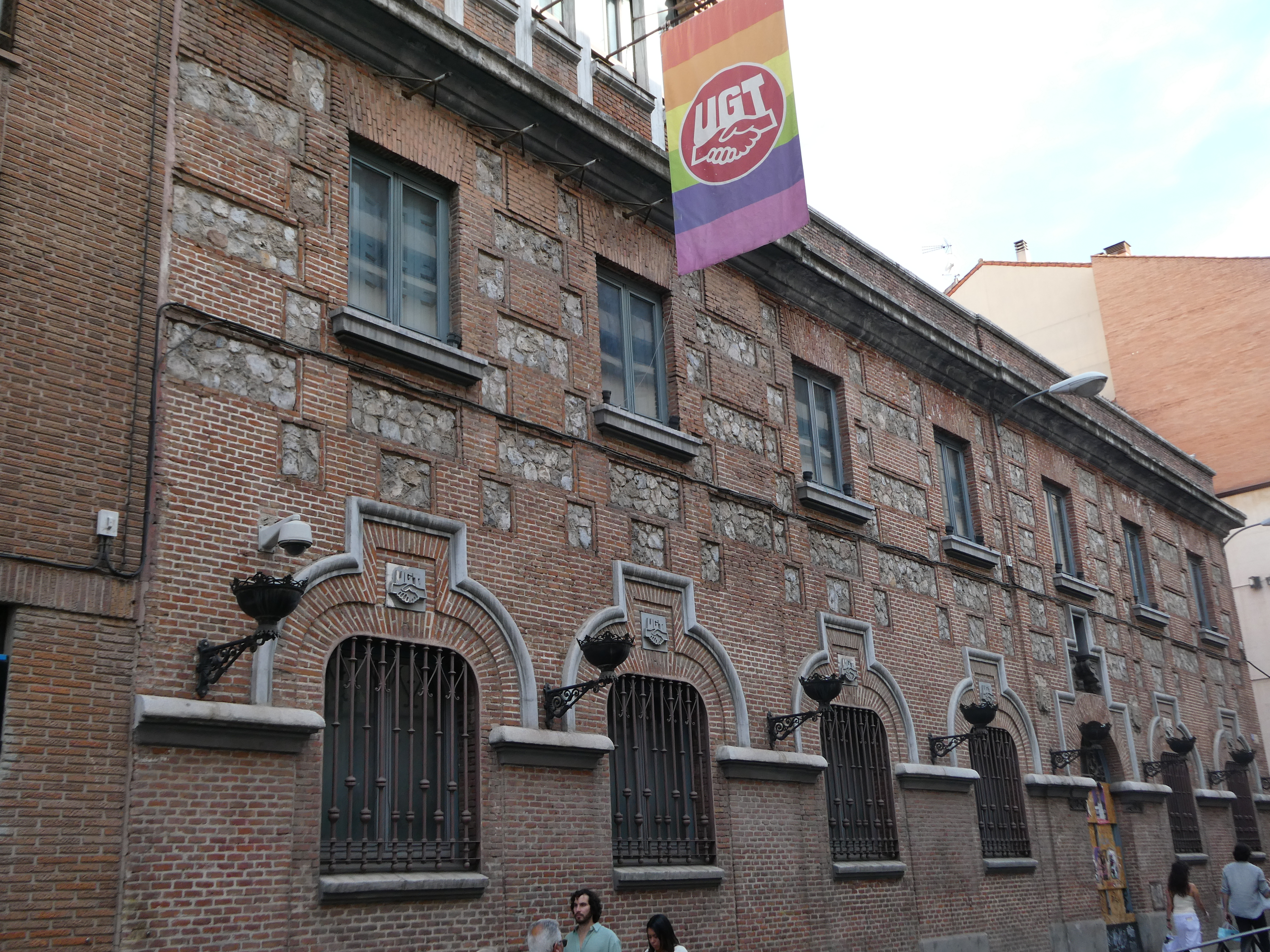
UGT headquarters (Madrid).

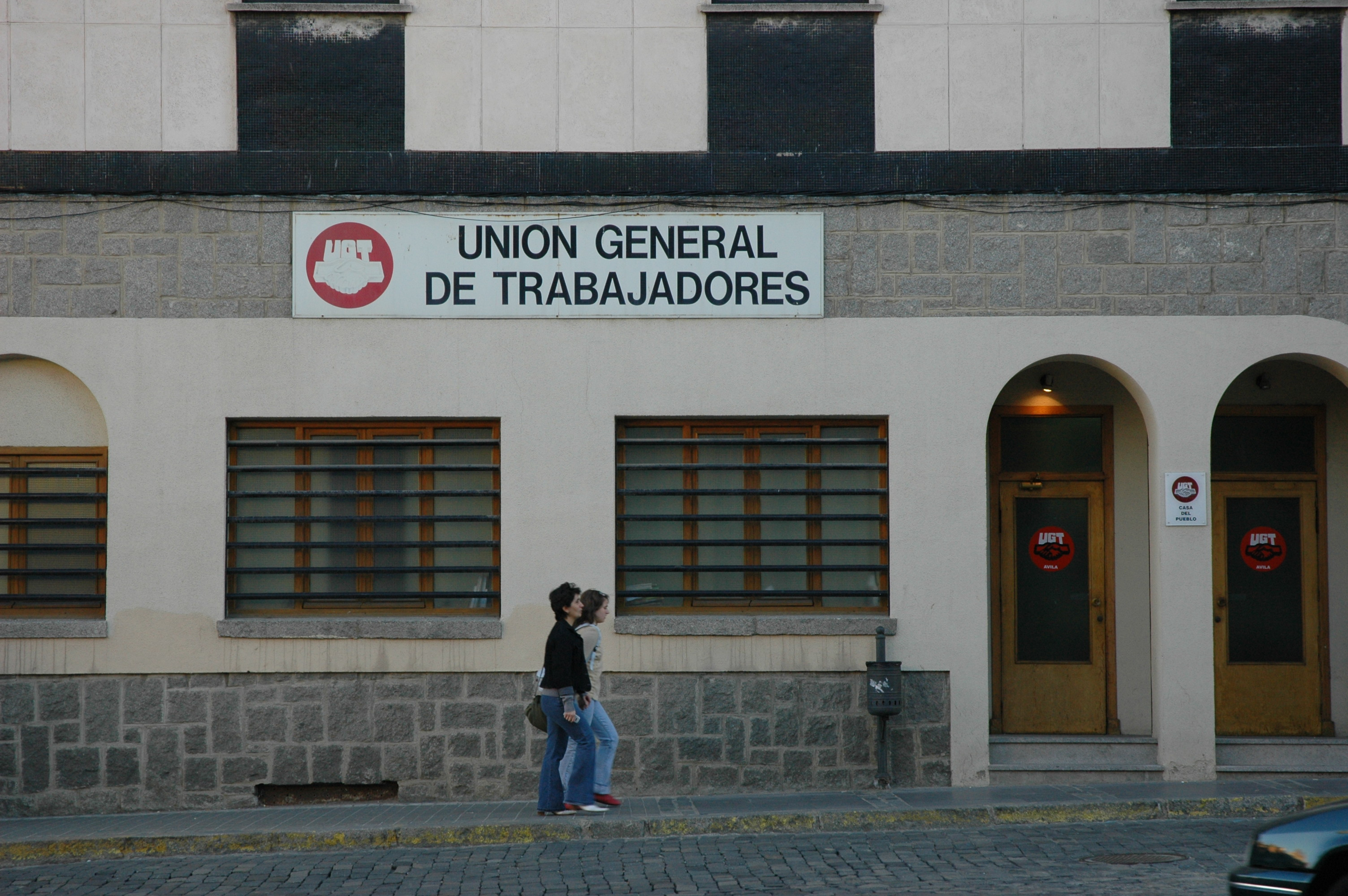
Local UGT office, Ávila, Spain

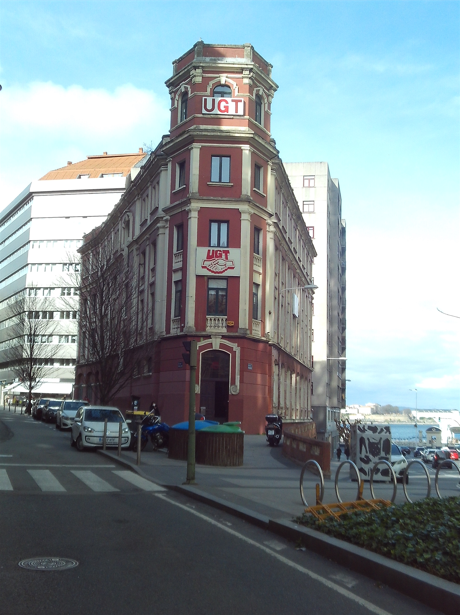
Local UGT office, Corunna.

Union	Abbreviation	Founded
Federation of Industry, Construction and Agriculture	FICA	2016
Federation of Public Service Employees	FeSP	2016
Federation of Services, Mobility and Consumption	FeSMC	2016
Pensioners' Union	UJP	1978
Professionals and Autonomous Workers' Union	UPTA	
Small Farmers' Union	UPA	1982

The Unión de Trabajadores por Cuenta Propia (UTCP, Union of Self-Employed Workers) is not an organism of UGT. It is a bottom-up association, formed by the farmers' union UPA and the professional and autonomous workers' union, UPTA, who united in this manner to enhance their representation inside the Union and to form a united front on factional issues where they have common interests.

=== Former affiliates ===
Union	Abbreviation	Founded	Left	Reason left	Membership (1981)	Membership (1994)
Federation of Agriculture and Food Processing	FTA	2001	2011	Merged into FITAG	N/A	N/A
Federation of Commerce		1974	1993	Merged into FECHTJ	6,552	N/A
Federation of Commerce, Catering-Tourism and Games	FECHTJ	1993	2014	Merged into SMC	N/A	51,011
Federation of Communication, Shows and Various Trades	CEOV		1993	Merged into FeS	11,145	N/A
Federation of Education Workers	FETE	1931	2016	Merged into FeSP	1,350	39,093
Federation of Hospitality		1979	1993	Merged into FECHTJ	8,179	N/A
Federation of Industrial and Agricultural Workers	FITAG	2011	2016	Merged into FICA	N/A	N/A
Federation of Light Industries	FIA	1992	2011	Merged into FITAG	N/A	69,527
Federation of Public Services	FSP	1982	2016	Merged into FeSP	6,888	133,501
Federation of Services	FeS	1993	2016	Merged into FeSMC	N/A	59,346
Federation of Services for Mobility and Consumption	SMC	2014	2016	Merged into FeSMC	N/A	N/A
Federation of Transport, Communication and Sea	TCM	1977	2014	Merged into SMC	21,942	71,629
Metal and Construction	MCA	1998	2016	Merged into FICA	N/A	N/A
National Federation of Agriculture	FTT	1930	2001	Merged into FTA	11,979	23,728
National Federation of Banking, Credit and Savings	FEBCA	1977	1983	Merged into FEBASO	4,523	N/A
National Federation of Banking, Savings, Insurance and Offices	FEBASO	1983	1993	Merged into FeS	N/A	N/A
National Federation of Chemicals, Energy and Related Industries	FETIQUE	1982	1992	Merged into FIA	14,560	N/A
National Federation of Construction, Wood and Related Industries	FEMCA	1977	1998	Merged into MCA	22,701	37,166
National Federation of Food Processing and Tobacco	FAyT		2001	Merged into FTA	10,452	27,511
National Federation of Insurance, Office and Office Workers	FETSO		1983	Merged into FEBASO		N/A
National Federation of Metalworkers	METAL	1930	1998	Merged into MCA	49,348	100,774
National Federation of Mineworkers			1992	Merged into FIA	9,652	N/A
National Federation of Textiles and Leather		1979	1992	Merged into FIA	11,401	N/A

== Leadership ==
=== General secretaries ===
1899: Antonio García Quejido
1905: Vicente Barrio
1918: Francisco Largo Caballero
1938: José Rodríguez Vega
1944: Pascual Tomás
1968: Manuel Muiño Arroyo
1971: Joint leadership
1976: Nicolás Redondo
1994: Cándido Méndez
2016: Pepe Álvarez Suárez

=== Presidents ===
1888: Antonio García Quejido
1892: Josep Comaposada
1894: Basilio Martín Rodríguez
1896: Luis Zurdo
1899: Pablo Iglesias
1925: Julián Besteiro
1934: Anastasio de Gracia
1938: Ramón González Peña
1944: Trifón Gómez
1956: Rodolfo Llopis
1971: Post abolished

== See also ==
- Pablo Iglesias, founder of both the UGT and the Spanish Socialist Workers' Party
- Ferrol, birthplace of both Francisco Franco (1892) and Pablo Iglesias (1850)
- Labor movement in Spain
- El Socialista Manchego
