= Juan Astigarrabía =

Basque communist politician

Juan Domingo Astigarrabía Andonegui
- Born: 20 November 1901; San Sebastián, Spain
- Died: 4 March 1989 (aged 87); San Sebastián, Spain
- Occupations: Sailor, politician

Juan Domingo Astigarrabía Andonegui (20 November 1901 – 4 March 1989) was a Basque communist politician, one of the founders of the Communist Party of the Basque Country and its first secretary-general. He was made a scapegoat for the fall of the North during the Spanish Civil War (1936–1939). He was expelled from the party and went into exile in Panama. Later he was rehabilitated and returned to Spain.

== Early years (1901–1932) ==
Juan Domingo Astigarrabía Andonegui was born in San Sebastián, the capital of Gipuzkoa, on 20 November 1901. His family were liberal Basques and early Basque socialists. He studied navigation for three years, and traveled widely as a sailor. As a young man he joined the Federación Vasco-Navarra of the Partido Comunista Español (PCE, Spanish Communist Party), and with the Zapirain brothers made the first contacts in 1924–25 in the construction industry. He belonged to the Federación Local de Sociedades Obreras (Local Federation of Workers' Societies). He toured throughout Spain setting up party cells.

At the time the Second Spanish Republic (1931–1939) was created Astigarrabía was one of the group of Basque communists that headed the trade union movement in San Sebastián and Pasaia. Police records name him as their leader. He led a march of fishermen from Pasaia to the capital, which resulted in several deaths by gunfire from the security forces.

== Party leader (1932–1936) ==
In 1932 the Spanish Communist Party made a major change in direction when it abandoned the Comintern slogan "Workers' and Peasants' Government" and adopted "Defense of the Republic". Astigarrabía was among the new leaders of the party who succeeded José Bullejos. The others were José Díaz, Vicente Uribe, Antonio Mije and Jesús Hernández Tomás. Astigarrabía was elected to the National Executive of the PCE, and attended the Congress of Seville. He was considered as a successor to José Bullejos, but the Communist International chose José Díaz, with whom he had very strained relations.

In 1934 Astigarrabía was appointed secretary-general of the Federación Vasco-Navarra of the PCE. During 1934 the Federation became the Partido Comunista de Euzkadi (Basque Communist Party), with the idea of including the three Basque departments in the southwest of France in what would become the "Union of Basque-Navarrese Socialist Republics". This would introduce a revolutionary element into France. However, Astigarrabía observed later that he had absolutely no independence from the PCE. After the revolutionary uprising that developed from the Asturian miners' strike of October 1934 he went into hiding. Astigarrabía participated in the Congress of Bilbao in 1935.

In 1935 Astigarrabía was one of the members of the Spanish delegation to the 7th Congress of the Communist International. He traveled to Moscow with Leandro Carro and Santiago Carrillo. He was not impressed by what he saw in Moscow and disagreed with his companions in the PCE leadership. He was a frequent contributor to La Antorcha and to Euskadi Roja, which was created in 1933. In June 1935 he was elected first secretary-general of the Communist Party of the Basque Country (Euskadiko Partidu Komunista, EPK) at its founding conference. Ramón Ormazábal was another founding member of the EPK in 1935. Ormazábal was against the autonomy of the EPK from the PCE proposed by Astigarrabía.

== Civil war (1936–1939) ==
With the outbreak of the Spanish Civil War in July 1936 Astigarrabía and the other Basque communist leaders, Jesús Monzón and Ramón Ormazábal, became isolated in the North. From November 1936 to June 1937 Astigarrabía represented the Basque Communist Party as Director of Public Works in the Basque government of José Antonio Aguirre. (Note: The first Basque government had four members of the Partido Nacionalista Vasco (Basque Nationalist Party): Jose Antonio Aguirre (President and Defense), Jesús María de Leizaola (Justice and Culture), Eliodoro de la Torre (Finance) and Telesforo Monzón (Interior). There were three members of the Partido Socialista Obrero Español (Spanish Socialist Workers' Party): Santiago Aznar (Industry), Juan Gracia Colás (Welfare) and Juan de los Toyos (Labor). The other members were Gonzalo Nárdiz (Agriculture) of Acción Nacionalista Vasca (Basque Nationalist Action), Ramón María Aldasoro Galarza (Trade) of the Izquierda Republicana (Republican Left), Alfredo Espinosa (Health) of Unión Republicana (Republican Union) and Juan Astigarrabía (Public Works) of the Partido Comunista de España (Communist Party of Spain).)

After the fall of the Basque front in 1937 Astigarrabía was made a scapegoat. The Basque Communist Party held a conference on 12–13 December 1937 in Barcelona, where they decided to expel him for excessive "proximity" to Basque nationalism. Although the Basques had the right for self-determination, this could only be achieved after the successful defense of the Spanish Republic against the Fascists and the victory of the popular revolution. Ramón Ormazabal accused him and Jesús Larrañaga of causing the fall of Biscay through "appeasement" and nationalism. Astigarrabía made a self-criticism, was expelled from the party and left Spain.

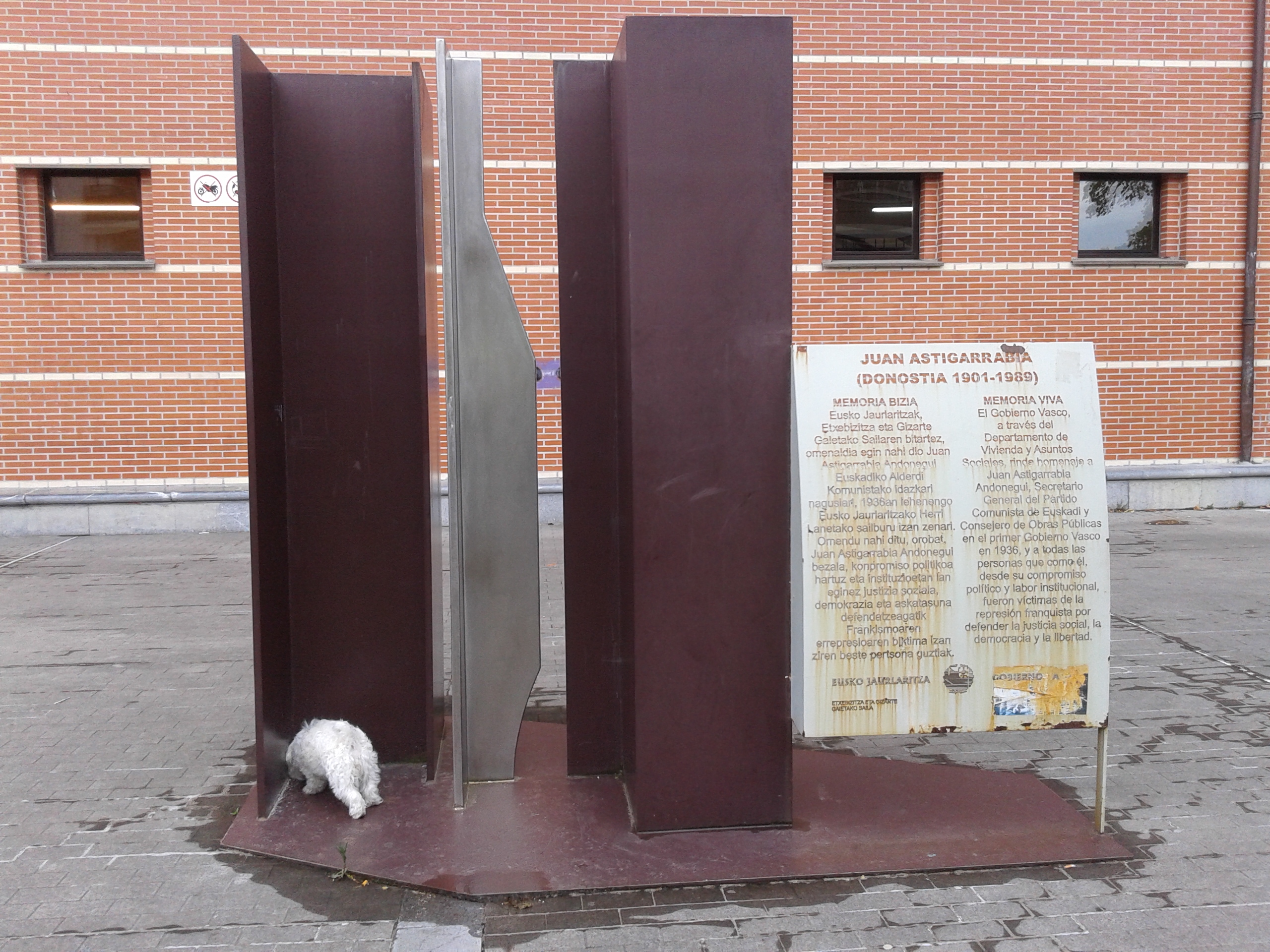
Monument to Astigarrabía in Donostia (San Sebastián)

== Exile and return (1938–1989) ==
Astigarrabía went into exile with his family and lived in Panama for 21 years. After twenty years Dolores Ibárruri stated that he was "recoverable". He rejoined the PCE, and then moved to Cuba for the next 20 years. After the Basque Communist Party was reorganized in 1974 he was given a symbolic position in the party, which was now headed by Ormazábal. In the late 1970s Astigarrabía left his family in Cuba to return to Basque politics. He returned to Spain in 1980, and was named Honorary President of Euskadiko Ezkerra on his return. Astigarrabía died in his home in San Sebastián on 4 March 1989.

== Sources ==
- Alexander, Robert J. (1999). The Anarchists in the Spanish Civil War. Janus Publishing Company Lim. ISBN 978-1-85756-400-6.
- Arrieta Alberdi, Leyre (2007). "Años de esperanza ante la nueva Europa: la estrategia europeísta del PNV tras la Segunda Guerra Mundial". Ayer (in Spanish) (67, Las relaciones de España con Europa centro-oriental (1939–1975)). Asociacion de Historia Contemporanea and Marcial Pons Ediciones de Historia. JSTOR 41325180.
- Arozamena Ayala, Ainhoa (2015). "Juan Astigarrabia Andonegui". Auñamendi Eusko Entziklopedia (in Spanish). Eusko Ikaskuntzaren Euskomedia Fundazioa.
- Elorza, Antonio (1989-03-07). "Juan Astigarrabía, comunista (y disidente) vasco". El País.
- Mevius, Martin (2013-09-13). The Communist Quest for National Legitimacy in Europe, 1918–1989. Taylor & Francis. ISBN 978-1-317-98639-3.
- Patxo Unzueta (1982-07-06). "Falleció Ramon Ormazábal, presidente del Partido Comunista de Euskadi". El País (in Spanish). Bilbao.
- Payne, Stanley G. (2008-10-01). The Spanish Civil War, the Soviet Union, and Communism. Yale University Press. ISBN 978-0-300-13078-2.
- "Ramón Ormazabal Tife". Auñamendi Eusko Entziklopedia (in Spanish).
