= Leandro Carro =

Spanish communist leader

Leandro Carro Hernáez
- Born: 27 November 1890; Zarratón, La Rioja, Kingdom of Spain
- Died: 1967 (aged 76–77); Dresden, German Democratic Republic
- Occupation: Politician

Leandro Carro Hernáez (27 November 1890 – 1967) was a Spanish communist leader who was active in the Communist Party of Spain (PCE) and the Communist Party of the Basque Country after its creation in 1935. He was later Minister of Public Works in the Basque government in exile in 1946–1948.

== Early years (1890–1920) ==
Leandro Carro Hernáez was born in 1890 in Zarratón, La Rioja. (Note: Another source gives his birthplace as Rodezno, a mile away from Zarratón. Both are villages in the mountains just south of Basque Country.) He was the second son of a shoemaker who had thirteen children. When he was seven he found work as an errand boy for a store selling household goods. He was apprenticed to an iron molder at the age of nine. He was raised in Biscay, and was introduced to politics by Facundo Perezagua. He agitated for the Agrupación Socialista (AS, Socialist Group) in San Sebastián and Pasajes, and later in Bilbao. He was an apprentice in the Vitoria-Gasteiz ironworks when he was arrested in 1909 for distributing propaganda against the Moroccan War. In 1910 he was working in Bilbao, where he was involved in a miner's strike. In 1911 he was appointed secretary of the Molders Society of the Biscay Metalworkers' Union. He was imprisoned in 1912 for activity in the workers' struggles in Pasajes.

Leandro Carro joined the Partido Socialista Obrero Español (PSOE, Spanish Socialist Workers' Party) and the Unión General de Trabajadores (UGT, General Union of Workers). In 1913 he was one of the founders of the Sindicato Metalúrgico de Vizcaya (Metal Workers Union of Vizcaya). In 1917 he was arrested for participating in the August general strike, but managed to escape to France. He remained in exile in Paris until an amnesty was declared. He returned in 1918 and was elected president of the Sindicato Metalúrgico de Vizcaya. He represented the union of the 13th congress of the UGT in 1918, and in the 14th congress in 1920.

== Communist leader in Spain (1920–36) ==
Leandro Carro attended the Extraordinary Congress of the PSOE in 1920 as delegate of the AS of Bilbao. He was one of the founders of the Partido Comunista de España (PCE, Communist Party of Spain). In the legislative elections of March 1923 he ran for election on the PCE platform in Barcelona. The PCE had little help from the Communist-Syndicalists led by Joaquín Maurín, and Carro received few votes. During the dictatorship of Miguel Primo de Rivera (1923–30) he was arrested several times and spent much of this period in prison. Carro became a member of the PCE central committee. In 1932 he was appointed secretary for union action of the Federación Vasco-Navarra (Basque-Navarre Federation) of the PCE. In 1935 he was appointed to the central committee of the newly formed Euskadiko Partidu Komunista (EPK, Basque Communist Party). In 1935 Carro was one of the members of the Spanish delegation to the 7th Congress of the Communist International. He traveled to Moscow with Juan Astigarrabía and Santiago Carrillo. In 1936 Carro was elected to the Cortes Generales as deputy for Bilbao.

== Civil war and exile (1936–67) ==
At the time of the 18 July 1936 military revolt that began the Spanish Civil War (1936–39) Carro was on a propaganda tour. He learned what was happening near Astorga and joined a group of railway workers. When the resistance was crushed he retreated to the mountains of Maceda where he joined in guerrilla actions against the forces of General Francisco Franco. He stayed with the guerrillas until he could move to Portugal. Carro went into hiding in the north of Portugal to avoid the police of Prime Minister António de Oliveira Salazar, who was hostile to communists.

World War II (1939–45) began in September 1939. Leandro Carro was in Lisbon in December 1939 where he applied for permission to travel to Mexico. The Mexicans approved the application in February 1940 and he reached Mexico in March 1940. After the war ended he moved to France, where he represented the EPK as Minister of Public Works in the Basque Government in exile headed by Jose Antonio Aguirre from 1946 to 1948. On 19 May 1948 Aguirre wrote to Carro explaining that the PCE should retire from the government due to their incompatibility with the socialists, although he would retain normal and friendly relations with the communists. Carro was arrested for his political activities and expelled from France. He moved to Dresden in East Germany, where he died in 1967.

== Sources ==
- Arozamena Ayala, Ainhoa (2015). "Juan Astigarrabia Andonegui". Auñamendi Eusko Entziklopedia (in Spanish). Eusko Ikaskuntzaren Euskomedia Fundazioa.
- FPI (2015). "Carro Hernáez, Leandro" (in Spanish). Fundación Pablo Iglesias.
- Huete, Cristina (2007-03-31). ""La resistencia gallega antifranquista fue la mejor organizada de España", afirma el historiador Heine". El País. Ourense.
- Lopez Adan, Emilio (2008). El nacionalismo vasco en el exilio. Txalaparta. ISBN 978-84-8136-519-1.
- Meaker, Gerald H. (1974). The Revolutionary Left in Spain, 1914–1923. Stanford University Press. ISBN 978-0-8047-0845-6.
- Ortiz Mateos, Antonio (2013-10-13). "Carro Hernáez, Leandro" (in Spanish).
- Shubert, Adrian (2003-09-02). A Social History of Modern Spain. Routledge. ISBN 978-1-134-87552-8.
