= Gipuzkoa (Congress of Deputies constituency) =

Electoral constituency in Spain

Coordinates: 43°10′N 2°10′W

- Congress of Deputies; Electoral constituency
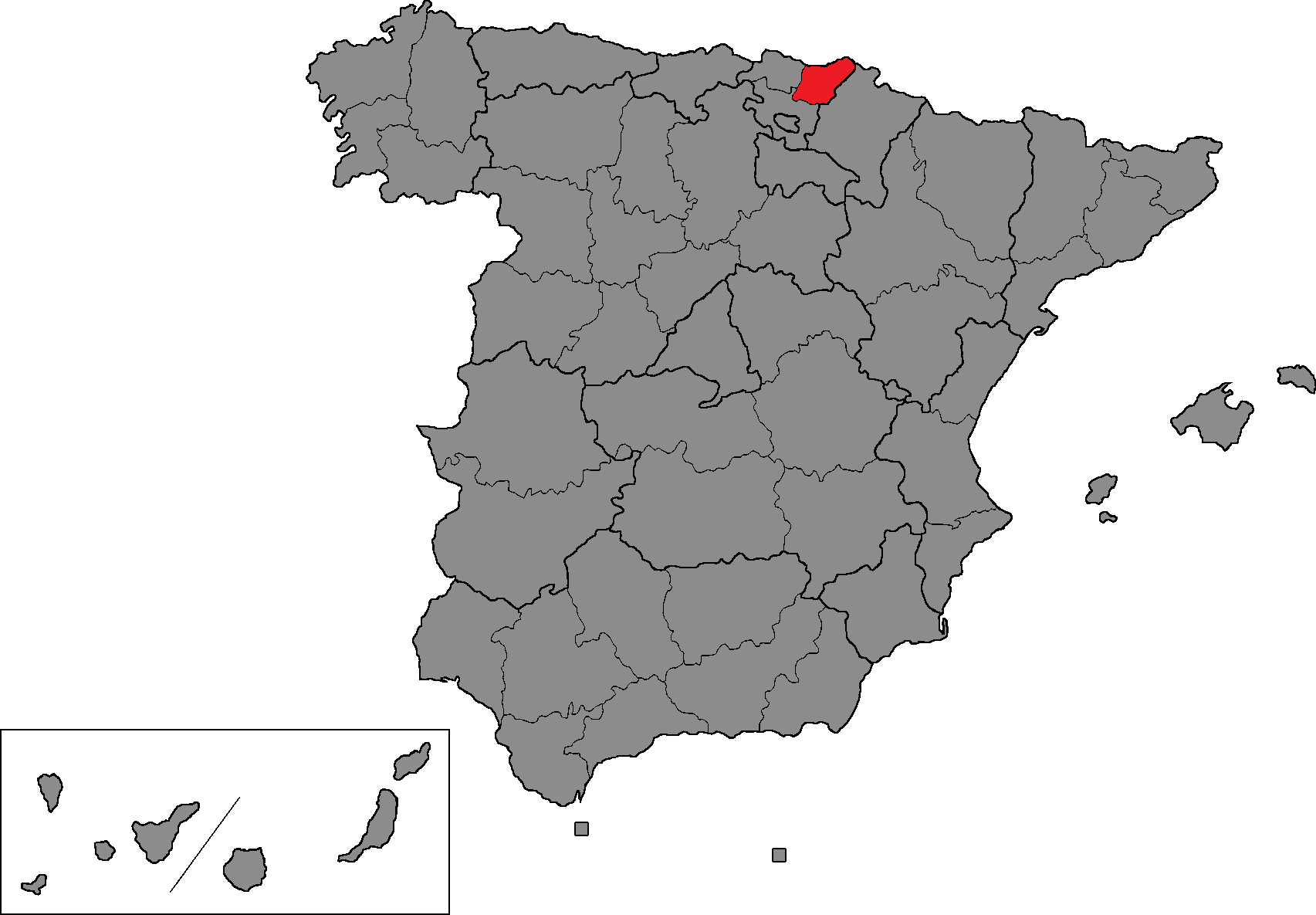
- Location of Gipuzkoa within Spain
- Province: Gipuzkoa
- Autonomous community: Basque Country
- Population: ▲731,182 (2024)
- Electorate: ▲585,873 (2023)
- Major settlements: San Sebastián, Irun

Current constituency
- Created: 1977
- Seats: 7 (1977–1993); 6 (1993–present)
- Members: EH Bildu (2); PSOE (2); PNV (2)

Gipuzkoa (Spanish: Guipúzcoa) is one of the 52 constituencies represented in the Congress of Deputies, the lower chamber of the Spanish parliament, the Cortes Generales. The constituency (whose boundaries correspond to those of the homonymous province) currently elects six deputies. The electoral system uses the D'Hondt method and closed-list proportional voting, with a minimum threshold of three percent.

== Electoral system ==
The constituency was created as per the Political Reform Law and was first contested in the 1977 general election. The Law provided for the provinces of Spain to be established as multi-member districts in the Congress of Deputies, with this regulation being maintained under the Spanish Constitution of 1978. Additionally, the Constitution requires for any modification of the provincial limits to be approved under an organic law, needing an absolute majority in the Cortes Generales.

Voting is based on universal suffrage, comprising all Spanish nationals over 18 years of age with full political rights, provided that they have not been deprived of the right to vote by a final sentence. The only exception was in 1977, when this was limited to nationals over 21 years of age and in full enjoyment of their political and civil rights. Amendments in 2011 required non-resident citizens to apply for voting, a system known as "begged" voting (Spanish: Voto rogado). which was abolished in 2022. Further, amendments in 2018 granted the right to vote to those legally incapacitated. The Congress of Deputies has a minimum of 300 and a maximum of 400 seats, with electoral provisions fixing its size at 350. Of these, 348 are elected in 50 multi-member constituencies corresponding to the provinces of Spain—each of which is assigned an initial minimum of two seats and the remaining 248 distributed in proportion to population—using the D'Hondt method and closed-list proportional voting, with a three percent-threshold of valid votes (including blank ballots) in each constituency. The remaining two seats are allocated to Ceuta and Melilla as single-member districts elected by plurality voting. The use of this electoral method may result in a higher effective threshold depending on district magnitude and vote distribution. The law does not provide for by-elections to fill vacant seats; instead, any vacancies arising after the proclamation of candidates and during the legislative term are filled by the next candidates on the party lists or, when required, by designated substitutes.

The electoral law allows for parties and federations registered in the interior ministry, alliances and groupings of electors to present lists of candidates. Parties and federations intending to form an alliance are required to inform the relevant electoral commission within 10 days of the election call—15 before 1985—whereas groupings of electors need to secure the signature of at least one percent of the electorate in the constituencies for which they seek election—one permille of the electorate, with a compulsory minimum of 500 signatures, until 1985—disallowing electors from signing for more than one list. Also since 2011, parties, federations or alliances that have not obtained a mandate in either chamber of the Cortes at the preceding election are required to secure the signature of at least 0.1 percent of electors in the aforementioned constituencies. Amendments in 2007 required a balanced composition of men and women in the electoral lists, so that candidates of either sex made up at least 40 percent of the total composition; further amendments in 2024 required the use of a zipper system.

== Deputies ==
Deputies 1977–present
Key to parties HB Amaiur EH Bildu (Note: From 2023.) EH Bildu (Note: Until 2023.) U.Podemos Podemos EE PSOE EA PNV UCD PP
Legislature	Election	Distribution
Constituent	1977	1 / 3 / 3
1st	1979	1 / 1 / 2 / 2 / 1
2nd	1982	1 / 1 / 2 / 3
3rd	1986	2 / 1 / 2 / 2
4th	1989	2 / 1 / 2 / 1 / 1
5th	1993	1 / 2 / 1 / 1 / 1
6th	1996	1 / 2 / 1 / 1 / 1
7th	2000	1 / 1 / 2 / 2
8th	2004	2 / 1 / 2 / 1
9th	2008	3 / 2 / 1
10th	2011	3 / 1 / 1 / 1
11th	2015	1 / 2 / 1 / 2
12th	2016	1 / 2 / 1 / 2
13th	2019 (Apr)	2 / 1 / 1 / 2
14th	2019 (Nov)	2 / 1 / 1 / 2
15th	2023	2 / 2 / 2

== General elections ==
=== 2026 ===
Summary of the 29 November 2026 Congress of Deputies election results in Gipuzkoa
Parties and alliances	Popular vote			Seats	
Parties and alliances	Votes	%	±pp	Total	+/−
Basque Country Gather (EH Bildu)					
Socialist Party of the Basque Country–Basque Country Left (PSE–EE (PSOE))					
Basque Nationalist Party (EAJ/PNV)					
Broad Front (FA)^{1}			n/a		
We Can (Podemos)^{1}			n/a		
People's Party (PP)					
Vox (Vox)					
Animalist Party with the Environment (PACMA)					
Blank Seats to Leave Empty Seats (EB)					
Workers' Front (FO)					
Communist Party of the Workers of the Basque Country (PCTE/ELAK)					
Blank ballots					
Total				6	±0
Valid votes					
Invalid votes					
Votes cast / turnout					
Abstentions					
Registered voters	597,859				
Sources
Footnotes: ^{1} Within the Unite alliance in the 2023 election.

=== 2023 ===
Summary of the 23 July 2023 Congress of Deputies election results in Gipuzkoa
Parties and alliances	Popular vote			Seats	
Parties and alliances	Votes	%	±pp	Total	+/−
Basque Country Gather (EH Bildu)	117,321	31.15	+5.31	2	±0
Socialist Party of the Basque Country–Basque Country Left (PSE–EE (PSOE))	87,709	23.29	+5.18	2	+1
Basque Nationalist Party (EAJ/PNV)	85,026	22.58	–7.92	2	±0
Unite (Sumar)^{1}	40,081	10.64	–4.34	0	–1
People's Party (PP)	32,721	8.69	+2.52	0	±0
Vox (Vox)	7,877	2.09	+0.19	0	±0
Animalist Party with the Environment (PACMA)^{2}	1,568	0.42	–0.12	0	±0
Blank Seats to Leave Empty Seats (EB)	933	0.25	+0.10	0	±0
Workers' Front (FO)	530	0.14	New	0	±0
Zero Cuts (Recortes Cero)	442	0.12	–0.01	0	±0
Communist Party of the Workers of the Basque Country (PCTE/ELAK)	259	0.07	±0.00	0	±0
For a Fairer World (PUM+J)	149	0.04	–0.06	0	±0
Blank ballots	2,005	0.53	+0.03		
Total	376,621			6	±0
Valid votes	376,621	99.38	–0.18		
Invalid votes	2,344	0.62	+0.18		
Votes cast / turnout	378,965	64.68	–1.11		
Abstentions	206,908	35.32	+1.11		
Registered voters	585,873				
Sources
Footnotes: ^{1} Unite results are compared to United We Can totals in the November 2019 election.; ^{2} Animalist Party with the Environment results are compared to Animalist Party Against Mistreatment of Animals totals in the November 2019 election.

=== November 2019 ===
Summary of the 10 November 2019 Congress of Deputies election results in Gipuzkoa
Parties and alliances	Popular vote			Seats	
Parties and alliances	Votes	%	±pp	Total	+/−
Basque Nationalist Party (EAJ/PNV)	116,761	30.50	+1.46	2	±0
Basque Country Gather (EH Bildu)	98,951	25.84	+2.46	2	±0
Socialist Party of the Basque Country–Basque Country Left (PSE–EE (PSOE))	69,342	18.11	–0.75	1	±0
United We Can (Podemos–IU)	57,363	14.98	–2.32	1	±0
People's Party (PP)	23,619	6.17	+1.12	0	±0
Vox (Vox)	7,274	1.90	+0.25	0	±0
Citizens–Party of the Citizenry (Cs)	3,824	1.00	–1.89	0	±0
Animalist Party Against Mistreatment of Animals (PACMA)	2,070	0.54	–0.23	0	±0
Blank Seats (EB/AZ)	570	0.15	–0.01	0	±0
Zero Cuts–Green Group (Recortes Cero–GV)	510	0.13	–0.01	0	±0
For a Fairer World (PUM+J)	401	0.10	±0.00	0	±0
Communist Party of the Workers of the Basque Country (ELAK/PCTE)	276	0.07	–0.01	0	±0
Blank ballots	1,907	0.50	–0.09		
Total	382,868			6	±0
Valid votes	382,868	99.56	+0.16		
Invalid votes	1,678	0.44	–0.16		
Votes cast / turnout	384,546	65.79	–5.23		
Abstentions	199,915	34.21	+5.23		
Registered voters	584,461				

=== April 2019 ===
Summary of the 28 April 2019 Congress of Deputies election results in Gipuzkoa
Parties and alliances	Popular vote			Seats	
Parties and alliances	Votes	%	±pp	Total	+/−
Basque Nationalist Party (EAJ/PNV)	119,668	29.04	+5.78	2	±0
Basque Country Gather (EH Bildu)	96,364	23.38	+4.27	2	+1
Socialist Party of the Basque Country–Basque Country Left (PSE–EE (PSOE))	77,720	18.86	+4.78	1	±0
United We Can (Podemos–IU–Equo Berdeak)	71,296	17.30	–11.31	1	–1
People's Party (PP)	20,797	5.05	–4.61	0	±0
Citizens–Party of the Citizenry (Cs)	11,892	2.89	–0.31	0	±0
Vox (Vox)	6,783	1.65	New	0	±0
Animalist Party Against Mistreatment of Animals (PACMA)	3,171	0.77	+0.01	0	±0
Blank Seats (EB/AZ)	678	0.16	New	0	±0
Zero Cuts–Green Group (Recortes Cero–GV)	593	0.14	–0.18	0	±0
For a Fairer World (PUM+J)	429	0.10	New	0	±0
Communist Party of the Workers of the Basque Country (ELAK/PCTE)	313	0.08	New	0	±0
Blank ballots	2,422	0.59	–0.15		
Total	412,126			6	±0
Valid votes	412,126	99.40	–0.06		
Invalid votes	2,474	0.60	+0.06		
Votes cast / turnout	414,600	71.02	+7.74		
Abstentions	169,145	28.98	–7.74		
Registered voters	583,745				

=== 2016 ===
Summary of the 26 June 2016 Congress of Deputies election results in Gipuzkoa
Parties and alliances	Popular vote			Seats	
Parties and alliances	Votes	%	±pp	Total	+/−
United We Can (Podemos/Ahal Dugu–IU–Equo)^{1}	104,566	28.61	+0.56	2	±0
Basque Nationalist Party (EAJ/PNV)	85,015	23.26	–0.20	2	±0
Basque Country Gather (EH Bildu)	69,828	19.11	–1.76	1	±0
Socialist Party of the Basque Country–Basque Country Left (PSE–EE (PSOE))	51,449	14.08	+0.79	1	±0
People's Party (PP)	35,312	9.66	+0.96	0	±0
Citizens–Party of the Citizenry (C's)	11,683	3.20	–0.55	0	±0
Animalist Party Against Mistreatment of Animals (PACMA)	2,788	0.76	+0.18	0	±0
Zero Cuts–Green Group (Recortes Cero–GV)	1,172	0.32	+0.12	0	±0
Union, Progress and Democracy (UPyD)	478	0.13	–0.21	0	±0
Communist Party of the Peoples of Spain (PCPE)	284	0.08	New	0	±0
Libertarian Party (P–LIB)	207	0.06	New	0	±0
Blank ballots	2,711	0.74	+0.09		
Total	365,493			6	±0
Valid votes	365,493	99.46	–0.02		
Invalid votes	1,971	0.54	+0.02		
Votes cast / turnout	367,464	63.28	–4.12		
Abstentions	213,242	36.72	+4.12		
Registered voters	580,706				
Sources
Footnotes: ^{1} United We Can results are compared to the combined totals of We Can and United Left–Popular Unity in Common in the 2015 election.

=== 2015 ===
Summary of the 20 December 2015 Congress of Deputies election results in Gipuzkoa
Parties and alliances	Popular vote			Seats	
Parties and alliances	Votes	%	±pp	Total	+/−
We Can (Podemos/Ahal Dugu)	98,533	25.30	New	2	+2
Basque Nationalist Party (EAJ/PNV)	91,359	23.46	+1.08	2	+1
Basque Country Gather (EH Bildu)^{1}	81,257	20.87	–13.91	1	–2
Socialist Party of the Basque Country–Basque Country Left (PSE–EE (PSOE))	51,764	13.29	–7.69	1	±0
People's Party (PP)	33,884	8.70	–5.03	0	–1
Citizens–Party of the Citizenry (C's)	14,608	3.75	New	0	±0
United Left–Popular Unity in Common (IU–UPeC)	10,722	2.75	–0.62	0	±0
Animalist Party Against Mistreatment of Animals (PACMA)	2,276	0.58	+0.05	0	±0
Union, Progress and Democracy (UPyD)	1,313	0.34	–1.19	0	±0
Zero Cuts–Green Group (Recortes Cero–GV)	782	0.20	New	0	±0
Navarrese Freedom (Ln)	368	0.09	New	0	±0
Blank ballots	2,537	0.65	–0.48		
Total	389,403			6	±0
Valid votes	389,403	99.48	+0.32		
Invalid votes	2,030	0.52	–0.32		
Votes cast / turnout	391,433	67.40	+1.85		
Abstentions	189,292	32.60	–1.85		
Registered voters	580,725				
Sources
Footnotes: ^{1} Basque Country Gather results are compared to Amaiur totals in the 2011 election.

=== 2011 ===
Summary of the 20 November 2011 Congress of Deputies election results in Gipuzkoa
Parties and alliances	Popular vote			Seats	
Parties and alliances	Votes	%	±pp	Total	+/−
Amaiur (Amaiur)^{1}	130,055	34.78	+21.72	3	+3
Basque Nationalist Party (EAJ/PNV)	83,703	22.38	–1.38	1	–1
Socialist Party of the Basque Country–Basque Country Left (PSE–EE (PSOE))	78,462	20.98	–18.02	1	–2
People's Party (PP)	51,362	13.73	–0.87	1	±0
United Left–The Greens: Plural Left (IU–LV)	12,595	3.37	–1.45	0	±0
Union, Progress and Democracy (UPyD)	5,734	1.53	+0.73	0	±0
Equo (Equo)	4,390	1.17	New	0	±0
Animalist Party Against Mistreatment of Animals (PACMA)	1,990	0.53	+0.20	0	±0
For a Fairer World (PUM+J)	1,038	0.28	+0.08	0	±0
Communist Unification of Spain (UCE)	399	0.11	New	0	±0
Blank ballots	4,239	1.13	–1.16		
Total	373,967			6	±0
Valid votes	373,967	99.16	+0.05		
Invalid votes	3,152	0.84	–0.05		
Votes cast / turnout	377,119	65.55	+8.17		
Abstentions	198,215	34.45	–8.17		
Registered voters	575,334				
Sources
Footnotes: ^{1} Amaiur results are compared to the combined totals of Basque Solidarity and Aralar in the 2008 election.

=== 2008 ===
Summary of the 9 March 2008 Congress of Deputies election results in Guipúzcoa
Parties and alliances	Popular vote			Seats	
Parties and alliances	Votes	%	±pp	Total	+/−
Socialist Party of the Basque Country–Basque Country Left (PSE–EE (PSOE))	127,840	39.00	+12.69	3	+1
Basque Nationalist Party (EAJ/PNV)	77,903	23.76	–7.20	2	±0
People's Party (PP)	47,858	14.60	–0.66	1	±0
Basque Solidarity (EA)	25,455	7.77	–3.76	0	–1
Aralar (Aralar)	17,332	5.29	–0.71	0	±0
United Left–Greens–Alternative (EB–B)	15,812	4.82	–2.87	0	±0
Union, Progress and Democracy (UPyD)	2,620	0.80	New	0	±0
The Greens (B/LV)	2,003	0.61	New	0	±0
Anti-Bullfighting Party Against Mistreatment of Animals (PACMA)	1,089	0.33	New	0	±0
For a Fairer World (PUM+J)	642	0.20	New	0	±0
Family and Life Party (PFyV)	422	0.13	New	0	±0
Engine and Sports Alternative (AMD)	375	0.11	New	0	±0
Carlist Party of the Basque Country–Carlist Party (EKA–PC)	240	0.07	+0.01	0	±0
Humanist Party (PH)	203	0.06	–0.25	0	±0
Citizens–Party of the Citizenry (C's)	185	0.06	New	0	±0
National Democracy (DN)	131	0.04	–0.03	0	±0
Spanish Phalanx of the CNSO (FE de las JONS)	85	0.03	±0.00	0	±0
Spanish Alternative (AES)	63	0.02	New	0	±0
Liberal Centrist Union (UCL)	44	0.01	New	0	±0
Blank ballots	7,513	2.29	+0.81		
Total	327,815			6	±0
Valid votes	327,815	99.11	+10.80		
Invalid votes	2,958	0.89	–10.80		
Votes cast / turnout	330,773	57.38	–15.17		
Abstentions	245,728	42.62	+15.17		
Registered voters	576,501				

=== 2004 ===
Summary of the 14 March 2004 Congress of Deputies election results in Guipúzcoa
Parties and alliances	Popular vote			Seats	
Parties and alliances	Votes	%	±pp	Total	+/−
Basque Nationalist Party (EAJ/PNV)	115,402	30.96	+3.23	2	±0
Socialist Party of the Basque Country–Basque Country Left (PSE–EE (PSOE))	98,100	26.31	+2.61	2	+1
People's Party (PP)	56,904	15.26	–9.35	1	–1
Basque Solidarity (EA)	42,971	11.53	–2.53	1	±0
United Left (EB/IU)	28,668	7.69	+3.02	0	±0
Aralar–Stand up (Aralar–Zutik)	22,352	6.00	New	0	±0
Humanist Party (PH)	1,155	0.31	+0.05	0	±0
Republican Left (IR)	505	0.14	New	0	±0
Democratic and Social Centre (CDS)	323	0.09	+0.04	0	±0
National Democracy (DN)	249	0.07	New	0	±0
Carlist Party of the Basque Country–Carlist Party (EKA–PC)	208	0.06	–0.02	0	±0
Republican Social Movement (MSR)	161	0.04	New	0	±0
Spanish Phalanx of the CNSO (FE de las JONS)^{1}	115	0.03	+0.01	0	±0
Authentic Phalanx (FA)	100	0.03	New	0	±0
The Phalanx (FE)	70	0.02	±0.00	0	±0
Blank ballots	5,509	1.48	–2.11		
Total	372,792			6	±0
Valid votes	372,792	88.31	–10.82		
Invalid votes	49,329	11.69	+10.82		
Votes cast / turnout	422,121	72.55	+16.67		
Abstentions	159,697	27.45	–16.67		
Registered voters	581,818				
Sources
Footnotes: ^{1} Spanish Phalanx of the CNSO results are compared to Independent Spanish Phalanx–Phalanx 2000 totals in the 2000 election.

=== 2000 ===
Summary of the 12 March 2000 Congress of Deputies election results in Guipúzcoa
Parties and alliances	Popular vote			Seats	
Parties and alliances	Votes	%	±pp	Total	+/−
Basque Nationalist Party (EAJ/PNV)	89,783	27.73	+7.99	2	+1
People's Party (PP)	79,696	24.61	+10.27	2	+1
Socialist Party of the Basque Country–Basque Country Left (PSE–EE (PSOE))	76,731	23.70	+1.01	1	–1
Basque Solidarity (EA)	45,525	14.06	–0.63	1	±0
United Left (EB/IU)	15,107	4.67	–2.58	0	±0
The Greens (B/LV)	2,772	0.86	+0.30	0	±0
Humanist Party (PH)	855	0.26	+0.17	0	±0
Natural Law Party (PLN)	648	0.20	New	0	±0
Internationalist Socialist Workers' Party (POSI)	263	0.08	New	0	±0
Carlist Party (EKA)	248	0.08	New	0	±0
Democratic and Social Centre–Centrist Union (CDS–UC)	155	0.05	–0.01	0	±0
Spain 2000 Platform (ES2000)	140	0.04	New	0	±0
Internationalist Struggle (LI (LIT–CI))	115	0.04	New	0	±0
The Phalanx (FE)	78	0.02	New	0	±0
Independent Spanish Phalanx–Phalanx 2000 (FEI–FE 2000)	75	0.02	New	0	±0
Basque Citizens (EH)^{1}	0	0.00	–18.44	0	–1
Blank ballots	11,634	3.59	+1.57		
Total	323,825			6	±0
Valid votes	323,825	99.13	–0.23		
Invalid votes	2,841	0.87	+0.23		
Votes cast / turnout	326,666	55.88	–13.68		
Abstentions	257,952	44.12	+13.68		
Registered voters	584,618				
Sources
Footnotes: ^{1} Basque Citizens results are compared to Popular Unity totals in the 1996 election. EH called for election boycott and urged its supporters to abstain.

=== 1996 ===
Summary of the 3 March 1996 Congress of Deputies election results in Guipúzcoa
Parties and alliances	Popular vote			Seats	
Parties and alliances	Votes	%	±pp	Total	+/−
Socialist Party of the Basque Country–Basque Country Left (PSE–EE (PSOE))	89,645	22.69	–0.54	2	±0
Basque Nationalist Party (EAJ/PNV)	77,976	19.74	+2.48	1	±0
Popular Unity (HB)	72,829	18.44	–2.07	1	±0
Basque Solidarity (EA)	58,030	14.69	–3.22	1	±0
People's Party (PP)	56,651	14.34	+2.80	1	±0
United Left (IU/EB)	28,644	7.25	+2.48	0	±0
European Greens–Basque Country Greens (VE–EHB)	2,199	0.56	–0.44	0	±0
Workers' Revolutionary Party (PRT)	431	0.11	New	0	±0
Humanist Party (PH)	374	0.09	New	0	±0
Centrist Union (UC)	236	0.06	–0.49	0	±0
Revolutionary Workers' Party (POR)	0	0.00	–0.06	0	±0
Blank ballots	7,998	2.02	–0.34		
Total	395,013			6	±0
Valid votes	395,013	99.36	+0.04		
Invalid votes	2,549	0.64	–0.04		
Votes cast / turnout	397,562	69.56	+2.66		
Abstentions	173,954	30.44	–2.66		
Registered voters	571,516				

=== 1993 ===
Summary of the 6 June 1993 Congress of Deputies election results in Guipúzcoa
Parties and alliances	Popular vote			Seats	
Parties and alliances	Votes	%	±pp	Total	+/−
Socialist Party of the Basque Country–Basque Country Left (PSE–EE (PSOE))^{1}	86,410	23.23	–6.97	2	–1
Popular Unity (HB)	76,309	20.51	–1.54	1	–1
Basque Solidarity–Basque Left (EA–EuE)	66,645	17.91	–0.03	1	±0
Basque Nationalist Party (EAJ/PNV)	64,195	17.26	+1.09	1	±0
People's Party (PP)	42,934	11.54	+4.59	1	+1
United Left (IU/EB)	17,733	4.77	+2.81	0	±0
The Greens (Berdeak/LV)	3,703	1.00	New	0	±0
Democratic and Social Centre (CDS)	2,044	0.55	–1.69	0	±0
The Ecologists (LE)	1,839	0.49	–0.15	0	±0
Ruiz-Mateos Group–European Democratic Alliance (ARM–ADE)	779	0.21	–0.14	0	±0
Natural Law Party (PLN)	310	0.08	New	0	±0
Revolutionary Workers' Party (POR)	216	0.06	±0.00	0	±0
Coalition for a New Socialist Party (CNPS)^{2}	123	0.03	–0.01	0	±0
Communist Unification of Spain (UCE)	0	0.00	New	0	±0
Blank ballots	8,775	2.36	+1.73		
Total	372,023			6	–1
Valid votes	372,023	99.32	–0.17		
Invalid votes	2,549	0.68	+0.17		
Votes cast / turnout	374,572	66.90	+0.58		
Abstentions	185,289	33.10	–0.58		
Registered voters	559,861				
Sources
Footnotes: ^{1} Socialist Party of the Basque Country–Basque Country Left results are compared to the combined totals of Socialist Party of the Basque Country and Basque Country Left in the 1989 election.; ^{2} Coalition for a New Socialist Party results are compared to Alliance for the Republic totals in the 1989 election.

=== 1989 ===
Summary of the 29 October 1989 Congress of Deputies election results in Guipúzcoa
Parties and alliances	Popular vote			Seats	
Parties and alliances	Votes	%	±pp	Total	+/−
Popular Unity (HB)	78,138	22.05	–1.00	2	±0
Socialist Party of the Basque Country (PSE–PSOE)	70,183	19.80	–3.34	2	±0
Basque Solidarity (EA)	63,569	17.94	New	1	+1
Basque Nationalist Party (EAJ/PNV)	57,290	16.17	–12.49	1	–1
Basque Country Left (EE)	36,857	10.40	–0.32	1	±0
People's Party (PP)^{1}	24,638	6.95	–1.16	0	±0
Democratic and Social Centre (CDS)	7,941	2.24	–1.36	0	±0
United Left (IU/EB)	6,935	1.96	+1.13	0	±0
The Ecologist Greens (LVE)	2,278	0.64	New	0	±0
Ruiz-Mateos Group (Ruiz-Mateos)	1,245	0.35	New	0	±0
Workers' Party of the Basque Country–Basque Country Workers (PTE–EL)^{2}	1,192	0.34	–0.40	0	±0
Workers' Socialist Party (PST)	700	0.20	–0.12	0	±0
Communist Party of the Peoples of Spain (PCPE)	315	0.09	New	0	±0
Spanish Phalanx of the CNSO (FE–JONS)	257	0.07	New	0	±0
Humanist Party (PH)	241	0.07	New	0	±0
Revolutionary Workers' Party of Spain (PORE)	217	0.06	New	0	±0
Alliance for the Republic (AxR)^{3}	146	0.04	–0.05	0	±0
Communist Party of Spain (Marxist–Leninist) (PCE (m–l))^{4}	0	0.00	–0.14	0	±0
Revolutionary Communist League–Communist Movement (LKI–EMK)^{5}	0	0.00	±0.00	0	±0
Blank ballots	2,229	0.63	+0.15		
Total	354,371			7	±0
Valid votes	354,371	99.49	+0.44		
Invalid votes	1,803	0.51	–0.44		
Votes cast / turnout	356,174	66.32	+0.86		
Abstentions	180,867	33.68	–0.86		
Registered voters	537,041				
Sources
Footnotes: ^{1} People's Party results are compared to People's Coalition totals in the 1986 election.; ^{2} Workers' Party of the Basque Country–Basque Country Workers results are compared to Communist Party of the Basque Country totals in the 1986 election.; ^{3} Alliance for the Republic results are compared to Internationalist Socialist Workers' Party totals in the 1986 election.; ^{4} Communist Party of Spain (Marxist–Leninist) results are compared to Republican Popular Unity totals in the 1986 election.; ^{5} Revolutionary Communist League–Communist Movement results are compared to the combined totals of Communist Movement of the Basque Country and Revolutionary Communist League in the 1986 election.

=== 1986 ===
Summary of the 22 June 1986 Congress of Deputies election results in Guipúzcoa
Parties and alliances	Popular vote			Seats	
Parties and alliances	Votes	%	±pp	Total	+/−
Basque Nationalist Party (EAJ/PNV)	99,515	28.66	–3.94	2	–1
Socialist Party of the Basque Country (PSE–PSOE)	80,336	23.14	–2.85	2	±0
Popular Unity (HB)	80,032	23.05	+3.76	2	+1
Basque Country Left (EE)	37,237	10.72	+0.80	1	±0
People's Coalition (AP–PDP–PL)^{1}	28,155	8.11	–0.03	0	±0
Democratic and Social Centre (CDS)	12,487	3.60	+1.93	0	±0
United Left (IU)	2,890	0.83	New	0	±0
Communist Party of the Basque Country (PCE/EPK)	2,578	0.74	–0.52	0	±0
Workers' Socialist Party (PST)	1,105	0.32	+0.02	0	±0
Republican Popular Unity (UPR)^{2}	482	0.14	+0.07	0	±0
Communist Unification of Spain (UCE)	449	0.13	+0.08	0	±0
Internationalist Socialist Workers' Party (POSI)	299	0.09	New	0	±0
Party of the Communists of Catalonia (PCC)	0	0.00	New	0	±0
Revolutionary Communist League (LKI)	0	0.00	±0.00	0	±0
Communist Movement of the Basque Country (EMK)	0	0.00	–0.02	0	±0
Blank ballots	1,681	0.48	+0.05		
Total	347,246			7	±0
Valid votes	347,246	99.05	+0.73		
Invalid votes	3,336	0.95	–0.73		
Votes cast / turnout	350,582	65.46	–12.66		
Abstentions	185,025	34.54	+12.66		
Registered voters	535,607				
Sources
Footnotes: ^{1} People's Coalition results are compared to AP–PDP–PDL–UCD totals in the 1982 election.; ^{2} Republican Popular Unity results are compared to Communist Party of Spain (Marxist–Leninist) totals in the 1982 election.

=== 1982 ===
Summary of the 28 October 1982 Congress of Deputies election results in Guipúzcoa
Parties and alliances	Popular vote			Seats	
Parties and alliances	Votes	%	±pp	Total	+/−
Basque Nationalist Party (EAJ/PNV)	125,389	32.60	+6.10	3	+1
Socialist Party of the Basque Country (PSE–PSOE)	99,972	25.99	+7.78	2	±0
Popular Unity (HB)	74,217	19.29	+1.70	1	±0
Basque Country Left–Left for Socialism (EE)	38,156	9.92	–2.95	1	±0
Democratic Coalition (AP–PDP–PDL–UCD)^{1}	31,308	8.14	–8.28	0	–1
Democratic and Social Centre (CDS)	6,407	1.67	New	0	±0
Communist Party of the Basque Country (PCE/EPK)	4,844	1.26	–1.79	0	±0
Workers' Socialist Party (PST)	1,142	0.30	New	0	±0
New Force (FN)^{2}	435	0.11	–0.62	0	±0
Communist Unity Candidacy (CUC)	389	0.10	New	0	±0
Communist Party of Spain (Marxist–Leninist) (PCE (m–l))	281	0.07	New	0	±0
Communist Unification of Spain (UCE)	206	0.05	New	0	±0
Communist League–Internationalist Socialist Workers' Coalition (LC (COSI))	183	0.05	New	0	±0
Communist Movement of the Basque Country (EMK)	63	0.02	–1.43	0	±0
Revolutionary Communist League (LKI)	11	0.00	–0.61	0	±0
Blank ballots	1,657	0.43	+0.20		
Total	384,660			7	±0
Valid votes	384,660	98.32	+0.15		
Invalid votes	6,577	1.68	–0.15		
Votes cast / turnout	391,237	78.12	+12.11		
Abstentions	109,583	21.88	–12.11		
Registered voters	500,820				
Sources
Footnotes: ^{1} AP–PDP–PDL–UCD results are compared to the combined totals of the Foral Union of the Basque Country and Union of the Democratic Centre in the 1979 election.; ^{2} New Force results are compared to National Union totals in the 1979 election.

=== 1979 ===
Summary of the 1 March 1979 Congress of Deputies election results in Guipúzcoa
Parties and alliances	Popular vote			Seats	
Parties and alliances	Votes	%	±pp	Total	+/−
Basque Nationalist Party (EAJ/PNV)	87,090	26.50	–4.44	2	–1
Socialist Party of the Basque Country (PSE–PSOE)^{1}	59,863	18.21	–11.32	2	–1
Popular Unity (HB)^{2}	57,811	17.59	+11.56	1	+1
Union of the Democratic Centre (UCD)	50,551	15.38	New	1	+1
Basque Country Left (EE)	42,293	12.87	+3.45	1	±0
Communist Party of the Basque Country (PCE/EPK)	10,034	3.05	–0.58	0	±0
Communist Movement–Organization of Communist Left (MC–OIC)	4,754	1.45	New	0	±0
Carlist Party (PC)	4,124	1.25	+1.25	0	±0
Foral Union of the Basque Country (UFPV)^{3}	3,419	1.04	–11.80	0	±0
Workers' Revolutionary Organization (ORT)^{4}	2,765	0.84	+0.09	0	±0
National Union (UN)	2,397	0.73	New	0	±0
Revolutionary Communist League (LCR)^{5}	2,000	0.61	–0.55	0	±0
Republican Left of the Basque Country (IR–E)	498	0.15	New	0	±0
Spanish Phalanx of the CNSO (Authentic) (FE–JONS(A))	287	0.09	New	0	±0
Union for the Freedom of Speech (ULE)	0	0.00	New	0	±0
Blank ballots	761	0.23	–0.12		
Total	328,647			7	±0
Valid votes	328,647	98.17	–0.57		
Invalid votes	6,126	1.83	+0.57		
Votes cast / turnout	334,773	66.01	–10.66		
Abstentions	172,369	33.99	+10.66		
Registered voters	507,142				
Sources
Footnotes: ^{1} Socialist Party of the Basque Country results are compared to the combined totals of Socialist Party of the Basque Country and People's Socialist Party–Socialist Unity in the 1977 election.; ^{2} Popular Unity results are compared to the combined totals of the Basque Socialist Party and Basque Nationalist Action in the 1977 election.; ^{3} Foral Union of the Basque Country results are compared to the combined totals of United Gipuzkoa and Basque Independent Democrats in the 1977 election.; ^{4} Workers' Revolutionary Organization results are compared to Workers' Electoral Group totals in the 1977 election.; ^{5} Revolutionary Communist League results are compared to Front for Workers' Unity totals in the 1977 election.

=== 1977 ===
Summary of the 15 June 1977 Congress of Deputies election results in Guipúzcoa
Parties and alliances	Popular vote			Seats	
Parties and alliances	Votes	%	±pp	Total	+/−
Basque Nationalist Party (EAJ/PNV)	102,494	30.94	n/a	3	n/a
Socialist Party of the Basque Country (PSE–PSOE)	93,010	28.07	n/a	3	n/a
Basque Country Left (EE)	31,208	9.42	n/a	1	n/a
United Gipuzkoa (GU)	27,048	8.16	n/a	0	n/a
Basque Socialist Party (ESB/PSV)	18,167	5.48	n/a	0	n/a
Basque Christian Democracy (DCV)	16,627	5.02	n/a	0	n/a
Basque Independent Democrats (DIV)	15,505	4.68	n/a	0	n/a
Communist Party of the Basque Country (PCE/EPK)	12,042	3.63	n/a	0	n/a
People's Socialist Party–Socialist Unity (PSP–US)	4,841	1.46	n/a	0	n/a
Front for Workers' Unity (FUT)	3,830	1.16	n/a	0	n/a
Workers' Electoral Group (AET)	2,476	0.75	n/a	0	n/a
Basque Nationalist Action (EAE/ANV)	1,818	0.55	n/a	0	n/a
Democratic Left Front (FDI)	1,059	0.32	n/a	0	n/a
Montejurra–Federalism–Self-Management (MFA)	10	0.00	n/a	0	n/a
Blank ballots	1,157	0.35	n/a		
Total	331,292			7	n/a
Valid votes	331,292	98.74	n/a		
Invalid votes	4,220	1.26	n/a		
Votes cast / turnout	335,512	76.67	n/a		
Abstentions	102,080	23.33	n/a		
Registered voters	437,592				

== Bibliography ==
- Ley 1/1977, de 4 de enero, para la Reforma Política (Fundamental Law 1/1977). Official State Gazette (in Spanish). 4 January 1977. BOE-A-1977-165.
- Real Decreto-ley 20/1977, de 18 de marzo, sobre Normas Electorales (Royal Decree-Law 20/1977). Official State Gazette (in Spanish). 18 March 1977. BOE-A-1977-7445.
- Constitución Española (Constitution). Official State Gazette (in Spanish). 27 December 1978. BOE-A-1978-31229.
- Ley Orgánica 5/1985, de 19 de junio, del Régimen Electoral General (Organic Law 5/1985). Official State Gazette (in Spanish). 19 June 1985. BOE-A-1985-11672.
- Carreras de Odriozola, Albert; Tafunell Sambola, Xavier (2005) [1989]. Estadísticas históricas de España, siglos XIX-XX (PDF) (in Spanish). Vol. 1 (II ed.). Bilbao: Fundación BBVA. pp. 1072–1097. ISBN 84-96515-00-1. Archived from the original (PDF) on 24 September 2015.
