= Cuzcurritilla =

- Populated place
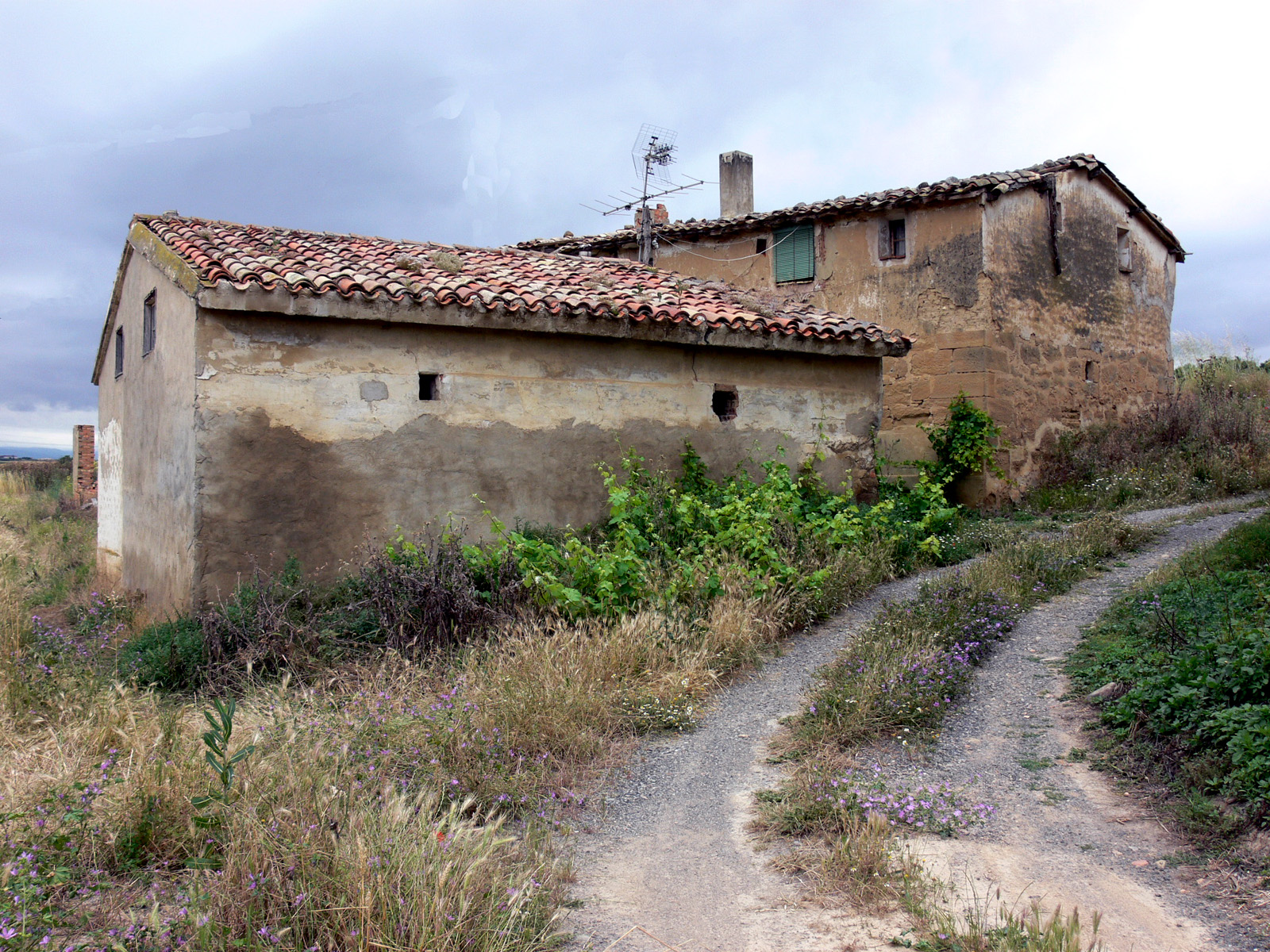
- Houses in Cuzcurritilla.

- Location within La Rioja, Spain Location within Spain
- Country: Spain
- Autonomous community: La Rioja
- Comarca: Haro

Population
  - Total: 2
- Postal code: 26222

Cuzcurritilla is a village in the municipality of Rodezno, in the province and autonomous community of La Rioja, Spain. As of 2018 had a population of 2 people.
