= Jesús Monzón =

Spanish lawyer and communist politician

Jesús Monzón Reparaz
- Born: 22 January 1910; Pamplona, Spain
- Died: 24 October 1973 (aged 63); Pamplona, Spain
- Occupation: Politician
- Known for: Invasion of the Val d'Aran

Jesús Monzón Reparaz (22 January 1910 – 24 October 1973) was a Spanish lawyer and communist politician. During World War II (1939–45) he helped organize Spanish members of the resistance to the Germans in France. In 1944 he organized a failed attempt to invade Francoist Spain. He was disavowed by the communist leadership in 1947 and spent many years in Spanish prisons.

== Early years (1910–36) ==
Jesús Monzón Reparaz was born in Pamplona, Navarre, in 1910 to a wealthy family. His family was Carlist. He was an educated and tolerant bon vivant. He studied in Barcelona and Madrid, sympathized with Marxism, and joined the Communist Party of Spain. He returned to Navarre after completing his studies, and soon became prominent in the small local group of communists. Monzón was distrusted by some communists for his background and cultivated appearance, but was always loyal to the ideology. As a lawyer he was appointed a clerk in the council of Navarre. He married Aurora Gómez Urrutia, and they had one child, Sergio. They were separated after Sergio died, but much later were reunited in Mexico in 1959.

Monzón was one of the founders of the Navarre branch of the Partido Comunista Español (PCE, Spanish Communist Party). In June 1935 he organized a major strike of construction workers in cooperation with the Carlist unions, where he showed strong leadership and the ability to work with people of different ideologies. He was a Popular Front candidate in the 1936 elections in Navarre. Monzón was elected a deputy for the PCE in the Popular Front. The Popular Front triumphed nationally, but in Navarre Rafael Aizpún's Unión Navarra of the Bloque de Derechas (Right Block) took 70% of the votes.

== Civil War (1936–39) ==
At the outbreak of the Spanish Civil War in July 1936 Monzón was in Pamplona. He managed to hide, then escaped to France, and from there reached Bilbao. He and the other Basque communist leaders, Ramón Ormazábal and Juan Astigarrabía, became isolated in the North. Later Monzón was named in turn civil governor of Alicante, Albacete and Cuenca. He was Civil Governor of Alicante from 31 July 1937, and was named governor of Cuenca in May 1938. The fall of Catalonia in February 1939 virtually ensured that the rebels would win the war. The last actions of Juan Negrín's government made the situation worse. On 5 March 1939 Negrín issued a decree appointing Monzón to take charge of the general secretariat of the Ministry of Defense. When Monzón left the Civil Governorship of Cuenca, the move was seen in Cuenca as abandonment of his post at a critical moment. He left Spain the next day on the same plane as Dolores Ibárruri.

== French Resistance (1939–44) ==
The PCE leadership left France after the Molotov–Ribbentrop Pact between Russia and Germany in August 1939 just before the outbreak of World War II. They moved to Mexico or the Soviet Union, safer countries that supported the Republic. Monzon remained behind with the younger and lower-ranking PCE exiles in France, and in the summer of 1939 formed the "Delegation of the PCE Central Committee in France", supported by Carmen de Pedro, Manuel Gimeno, Manuel Azcárate and Jaime Nieto. They reorganized and rejuvenated the PCE in France, improvising policy as needed. Monzón became the main leader of the communist exiles in France, defining ideology and strategy. He took the pseudonym "Mariano".

There were thousands of Spanish refugees in concentration camps in France. Monzón chartered ships on which many of the refugees escaped at the start of the German occupation of France in the summer of 1940. He organized those who remained into rural labor groups in Vichy France. These became the basis for the Agrupaciones de Guerrilleros Españoles (AGE), the Spanish maquis, which fought against the Germans. Monzón worked with Gabriel León Trilla in reorganizing the PCE members and placing them in the French Resistance. By the summer of 1944 the AGE veterans of the Spanish Republic's Popular Army had made a significant contribution to defeating the Germans in the south of France. The "Latin Americans" and "Russians" in the PCE leadership frowned on the independent action of the French PCE as "resisters".

== Spanish National Union (1941–44) ==
In August 1941 the PCE in France started to form the Unión Nacional Española (UNE, Spanish National Union), which would unite all left-wing political sectors opposed to Francoism. In September 1942 the Central Committee of the PCE in France offered to join with all anti-fascists including Carlists, Monarchists and the Christian Right. The UNE was founded officially on 11 November 1942 in Toulouse. The press organ was Reconquista de España. The UNE was never dominated by Stalinists, but was more a precursor of the post-war democratic popular front. Monzón was president of the UNE from 1943 to 1945.

Monzón clandestinely entered Spain in the spring of 1943. He settled in a villa near Madrid where he disguised himself and pretended to be a doctor. In September 1943 Monzón started work in Madrid on organizing the Guerrilla Army of the Center in Spain. That month he established the Junta Suprema de Unión Nacional (Supreme Council of National Union) in Madrid, which was more wishful thinking than reality. In February 1944 Monzon called for preparation for a national insurrection.

Monzón thought that if the UNE forces occupied part of Spain next to the newly liberated French territory, and held it for long enough, the Allies would be drawn into a conflict with Franco's forces. A provisional government would be declared, and it was hoped that the Allied powers, who were winning the war against Fascism, would recognize it. It was also hoped that the invasion would trigger a national uprising. The Val d'Aran was chosen for the attempt because it was on the north side of the Pyrenees and isolated from the rest of the country in winter. In October 1944 more than 10,000 (Note: One source gives the number of guerrillas as 4,000 rather than 10,000.) guerrillas created a series of actions and diversions in Aragon and Navarre to create the conditions for revolution. The bulk of the forces entered the Val d'Aran unopposed on 19 October 1944. They raised tricolor flags and waited. The attempt failed miserably after ten days of fighting with the Spanish army.

In his memoirs Santiago Carrillo cast grave doubts on Monzón's ability or motives in launching the invasion. He said the PCE had told the Spanish communists in France not to attempt any mass invasion, but to infiltrate in small groups and settle inland. Carrillo was sent to France, and learned from the leaders of the invasion in the Val d'Aran, which they said had been ordered by a "Supreme Council of National Union". Carrillo said this existed only in the imagination of Monzón. Carrillo said he managed to persuade the French PCE to abandon the project, since ten thousand picked militants would have been massacred by José Moscardó Ituarte, who had 50,000 troops. The guerrilla group retreated to France, and became a commercial company dedicated to cutting firewood and reforestation.

== Later years (1944–73) ==
In 1945 Monzon was disgraced because of his action and was removed from the presidency of the Unión Nacional. He was accused by the PCE of being opportunistic, of having prioritized the Unión Nacional Española and "diluted" the PCE. Santiago Carrillo accused Monzón and his followers of "deviationism". In July 1945, after waiting several months to travel to France, he was arrested by the police in Barcelona. (Note: According to the historian Ricardo de la Cierva, Carrillo betrayed Monzón to the police. However, Vicente Uribe said that the PCE had given orders that both Monzón and León Trilla be assassinated. Monzón escaped Trilla's fate by being arrested. Gregorio Morán wrote that when Monzón was arrested in Barcelona the PCE leaders suspected he had arranged this to avoid reporting to them.) Monzón was brought before a court martial and sentenced to 30 years in prison. Through the influence of Carlist friends he avoided the death sentence. After being condemned by the PCE leaders and imprisoned by Franco, Monzón was largely forgotten. In 1947 he was expelled from the PCE, who portrayed him as little more than a traitor. Monzón was released in 1959 and joined his wife in Mexico. He spent the last years of his life in the Balearic islands, and returned to Pamplona a few months before his death in 1973.

== Sources ==
- Alba, Víctor (1983-01-01). The Communist Party in Spain. Transaction Publishers. ISBN 978-1-4128-1999-2.
- Alía Miranda, Francisco; Valle Calzado, Angel Ramón del; Morales Encinas, Olga M. (2008). La guerra civil en Castilla-La Mancha, 70 años después: actas del Congreso Internacional. Univ de Castilla La Mancha. ISBN 978-84-8427-555-8.
- Aróstegui, Julio; Marco, Jorge (2008). El último frente: la resistencia armada antifranquista en España, 1939-1952. Los Libros de la Catarata. ISBN 978-84-8319-381-5.
- Asenjo, Mariano; Ramos, Victora (2008). Malagón : autobiografía de un falsificador. Editorial El Viejo Topo. ISBN 978-84-96831-70-4.
- Basaburua, José (2013). "El sinsentido de una vida entregada a la ideología. Un líder comunista olvidado por la Historia: Jesús Monzón". Arbil, Anotaciones de Pensamiento y Critica (in Spanish) (37). Foro Arbil.
- Belasko, Ana (1998-10-25). "Jesús Monzón, la primera víctima de Carrillo en el PCE". El Mundo (in Spanish).
- Bengaray, Manuel (June 2007). "Biografia de Ramon Bengaray" (PDF). Antzina (in Spanish). ISSN 1887-0554.
- Bueno, Gustavo (April 2005). ""Maquis", un ejercicio reciente de "memoria histórica"". El Catoblepas (in Spanish) (38).
- Cierva, Ricardo de la (1994). Carrillo miente, 156 documentos contra 103 falsedades (in Spanish). Fénix. ISBN 84-88787-03-0.
- Egaña, Iñaki (1996). "Monzón Repáraz, Jesús". Diccionario histórico-político de Euskal Herria (in Spanish). Txalaparta. ISBN 978-84-8136-039-4.
- Elorza, Antonio (1989-03-07). "Juan Astigarrabía, comunista (y disidente) vasco". El País.
- Grandes, Amudena (2014-11-02). "Hace setenta años". El País (in Spanish).
- Moreno Gómez, Francisco (2006). "Lagunas en la memoria y en la historia del maquis" (PDF). Hispania Nova, Revista de Historia Contemporánea (in Spanish) (6). ISSN 1138-7319.
- Ortiz, Javier (November 2000). "Jesús Monzón". Página abierta (in Spanish).
- Sánchez Cervelló, Josep; Agudo, Sebastián (2015-04-23). Las Brigadas Internacionales: Nuevas perspectivas en la historia de la Guerra Civil y del exilio. Publicacions Universitat Rovira I Virgili. ISBN 978-84-8424-363-2.
