= Cuzcurrita de Río Tirón =

- Municipality
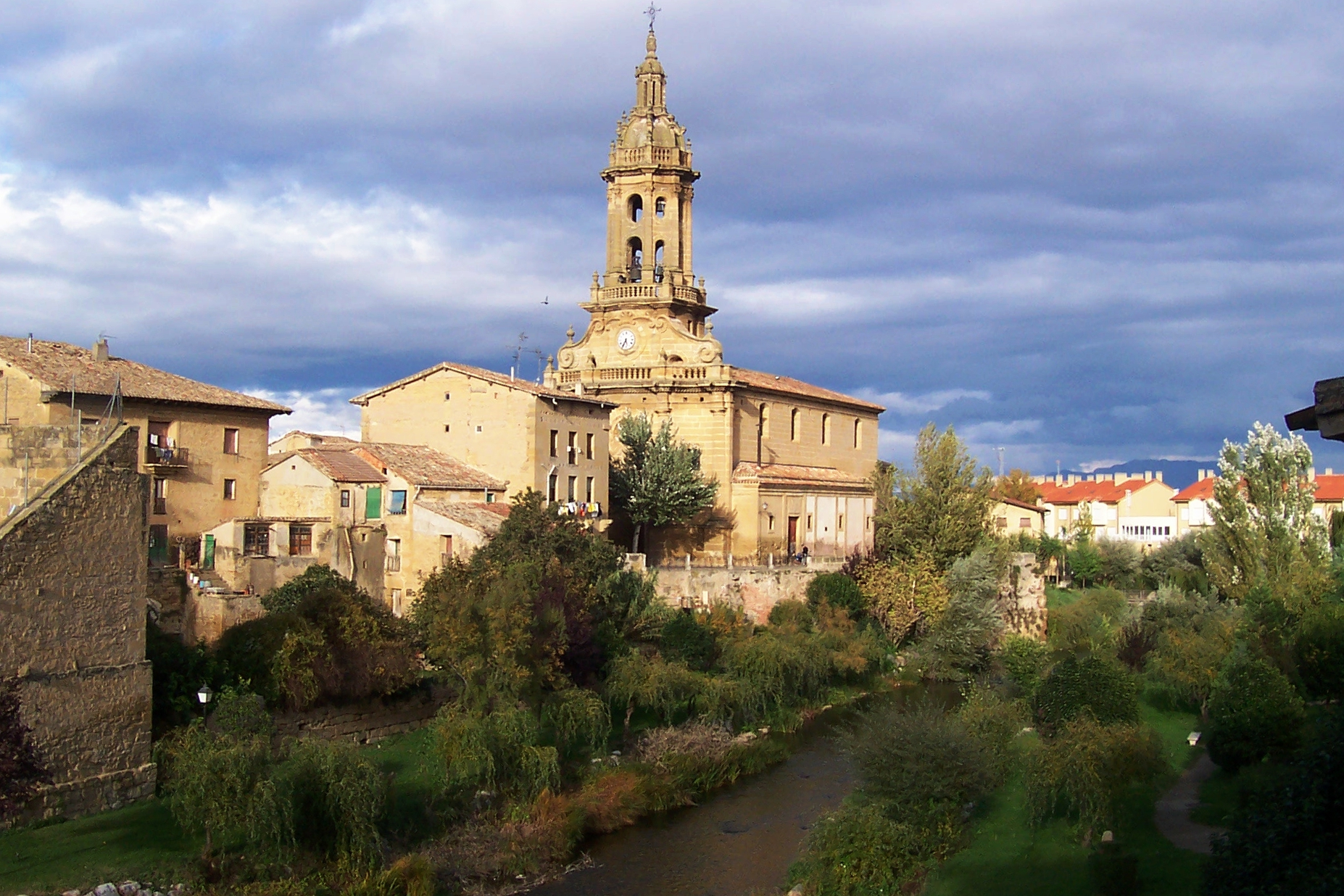

- Coat of arms

- Municipality of Cuzcurrita de Río Tirón

- Location of Cuzcurrita de Río Tirón within La Rioja Cuzcurrita de Río Tirón (Spain)
- Coordinates: 42°32′29″N 2°57′46″W
- Country: Spain
- Autonomous community: La Rioja
- Comarca: Haro

Government
  - Mayor: Román Urrecho Junquera (PP)

Area
  - Total: 19.17 km^{2} (7.40 sq mi)

Population (2025-01-01)
  - Total: 565
  - Density: 29.5/km^{2} (76.3/sq mi)
- Demonym(s): Spanish: cuzcurritano, cuzcurritana
- Time zone: UTC+1 (CET)
  - Summer (DST): UTC+2 (CEST)
- Postal code: 26214

Cuzcurrita de Río Tirón, known as Cuzcurrita is a village in the province and autonomous community of La Rioja, Spain. The municipality covers an area of 19.17 square kilometres (7.40 sq mi) and as of 2011 had a population of 544 people.

== History ==
The oldest known document referring to the village dates from 1062 and is a royal bond issued by King Sancho IV of Pamplona in which several houses/crown land in Zarratón are ceded to the noble García Garcei. The place name used is Coscorrita.

In 1086, in the tale of the miracle of Santo Domingo de Silos, a person called Servando is named as being a native of Cuzcurrita.

The jurisdiction of Miranda de Ebro mentioned the existence of Quosquorrita at the end of the 11th century.

On 15 November 1367, the monarch Enrique II of Castile rewarded Juan Martínez de Rojas, by giving him Lordship of Cuzcurrita with all its territories and rights.

In the 16th century, under the reign of Philip II of Spain, Pedro Velasco, ninth Lord of Cuzcurrita, by virtue of his marriage to Marta de Rojas y Osorio, founded an entailed estate mayorazgo, carving his blazon over the door of the castle as can be seen today.

This castle was built by the Suárez de Figueroa at the end of the 14th or the beginning of the 15th century. In the 19th century, after the laws abolishing lordships and manors (señoríosand mayorazgos), it continued to belong for some years to the descendants of the Velasco-Rojas family. Afterwards it was successively bought and sold until 1945 when its new owners restored the property to be used as a home.

Cuzcurrita, in the Middle Ages, was a fortress; the town was walled, in addition to a castle outside the town walls.

Belonging to the district of Santo Domingo de la Calzada, it formed a part of the province of Burgos until the creation of the new province of Logroño (Royal Decreé of 30 November 1833). A year later the province was divided into nine new judicial districts and was included in that of Haro (Royal Decree of 21 April 1834).

== Population ==
As on 1 January 2010 the population of the town was 554 inhabitants, 292 males and 262 females.

demographic vertical bar chart of Cuzcurrita de Río Tirón between 1857 and 2010
Population (1857–1897) According to the census of the INE in the 19th century.
Population (1900–1991) Residential population (2001) according to the census of the INE.
Population from the municipal census of 2010 of the INE.

== Heritage ==
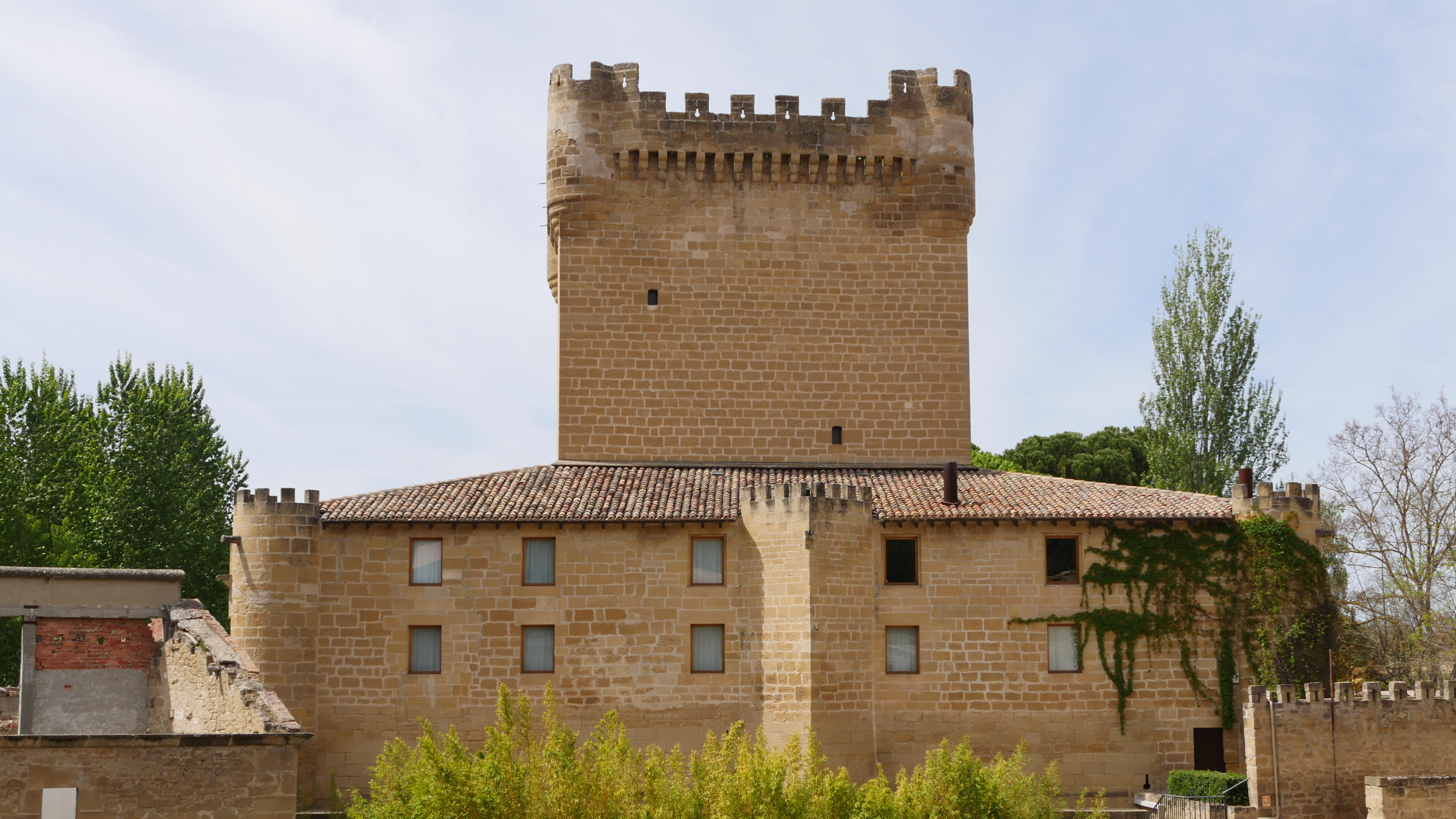
Castillo de los Velasco

- The Velasco Castle

Built at the end of the 15th century by Pedro Suárez de Figueroa, it is a walled construction with corner cubes and a graceful keep (tower) which does not have any windows in its walls.

In the 16th century, during the reign of Phillip II, D. Pedro de Velasco, IX señor of Cuzcurrita, founded the entailed estate (mayorazgo) on marrying Marta de Rojas y Osorio, carving the heraldic arms over the entrance arch in the north wall.

It has been listed as a Site of Cultural Interest in the category of Monument since 15 July 1980.

- The Rollo (pillory)

Located on the el Bolo hill outside the town, it was an unmistakable symbol of the town being a señorío.

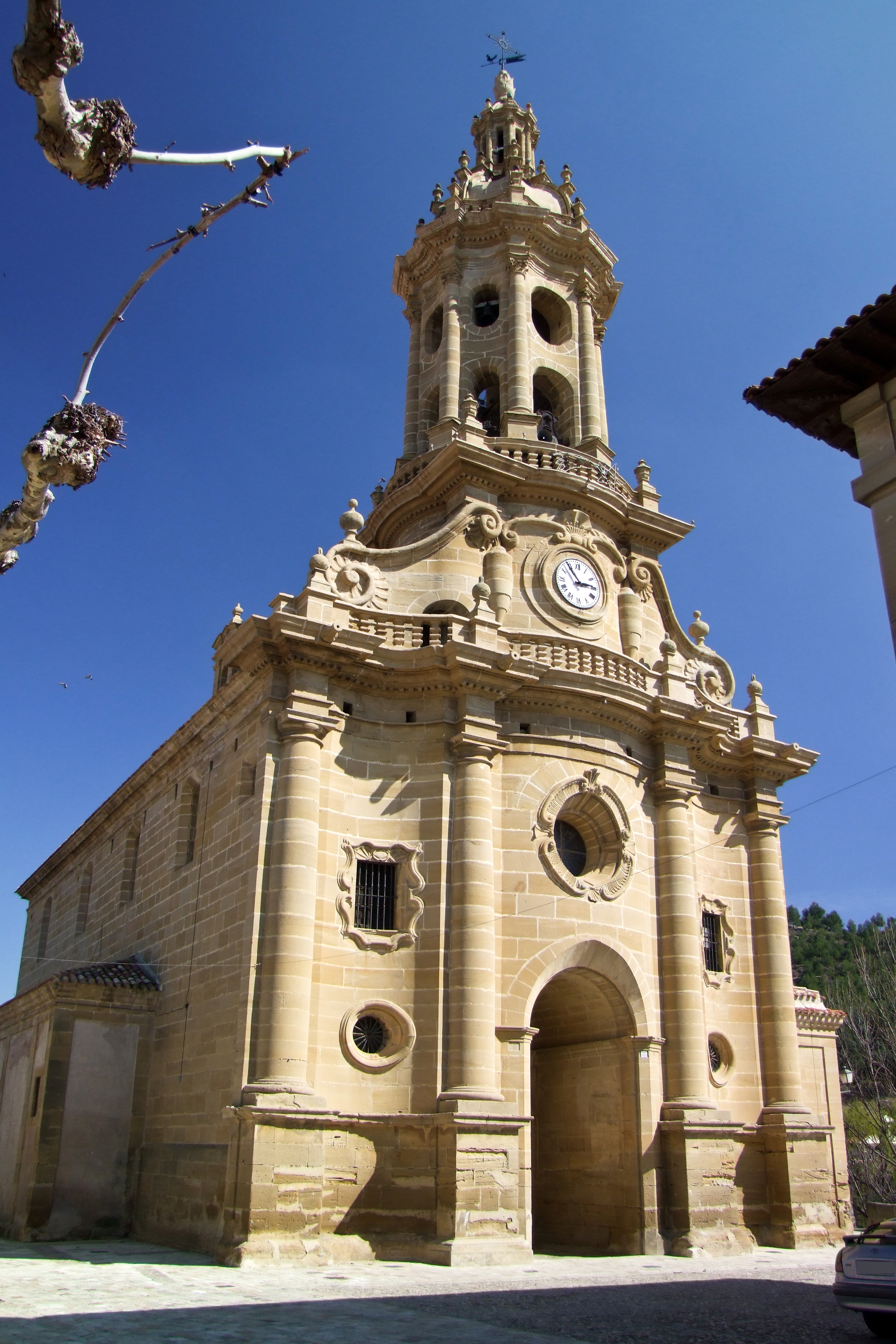
Iglesia de San Miguel.

- St. Michael's Church

In the main square (Plaza Mayor), it was built in the 18th century in the Rioja Baroque style, and finished in 1805.

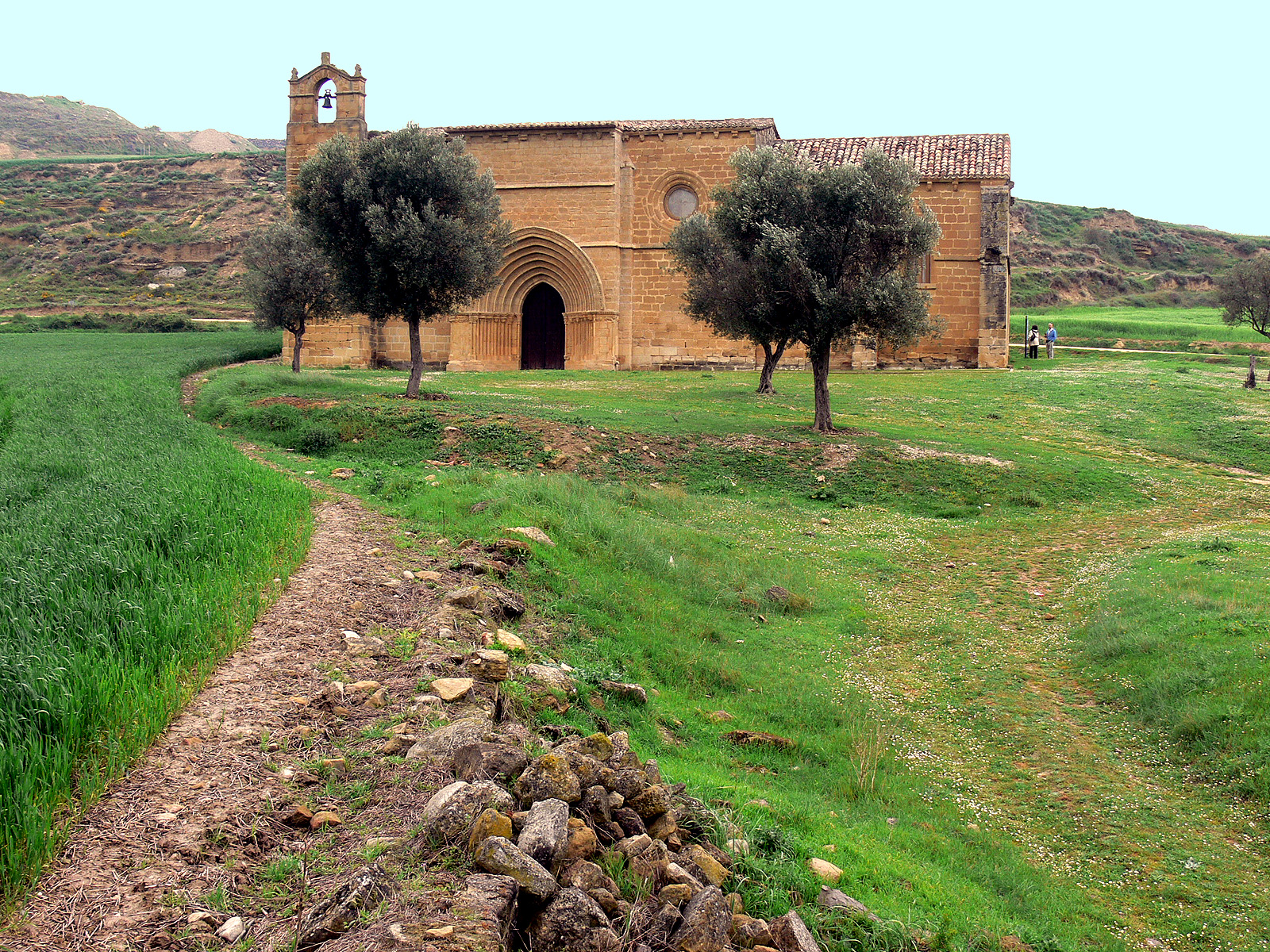
Ermita de Nª Señora de Sorejana.

- Hermitage: Nª Señora de Sorejana

Located 1.5 km upriver from Cuzcurrita. In the Romanic style.

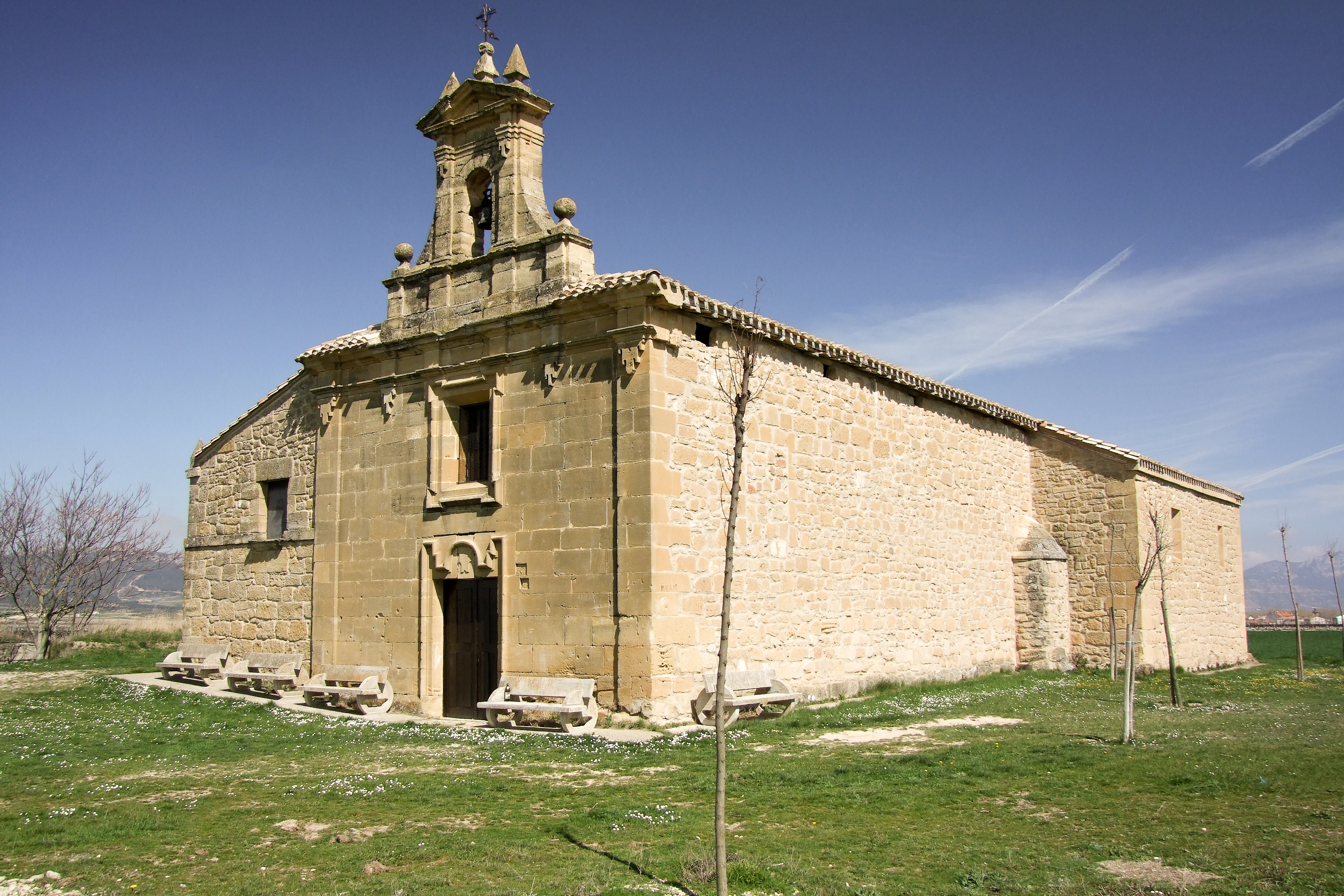
Ermita de Nuestra Señora de Tironcillo.

- Hermitage: Nª Señora de Tironcillo

Located 3 km downriver from Cuzcurrita on the river Tirón. Built in the 18th century in the Baroque style.
