= Manuel Azcárate =

Spanish writer and politician (1916-1998)

Manuel Azcárate Diz
- Born: 7 October 1916; Madrid, Spain
- Died: 24 August 1998 (aged 81); Madrid, Spain
- Occupations: Journalist, politician
- Known for: Communist party leader

Manuel Azcárate Diz (7 October 1916 – 24 August 1998) was a Spanish journalist, politician and a leader of the Communist Party of Spain (Partido Comunista de España, PCE) in the 1960s and 1970s.

== Life ==
=== Birth and education (1916–36) ===
Manuel Azcárate Diz was born in Madrid on 7 October 1916. He was grand-nephew of Gumersindo de Azcárate, who introduced Krausism to Spain, and nephew of Justino de Azcárate, a liberal Republican senator in the 1930s. His father was Pablo de Azcárate, deputy secretary general at the League of Nations and later Spanish ambassador in London. During Manuel's childhood his father was based in Geneva, where Manuel was educated at an elite school, the Free Institution of Education. When he was 18 Manuel Azcárate attended courses at the London School of Economics, where he met professor Harold Laski. In 1933 he began to study law and economics at the University of Madrid.

The PCE created the Union of Communist Students in 1933. Azcárate, Fernando Claudín, Manuel Tuñón de Lara and Luis Sendín became members. Azcárate joined the Communist Youth in 1934. Writing in the preface to his father's book Mi embajada en Londres durante la guerra civil española Manuel Azcárate said "In spite of the serious discussions and differences between us, he always respected the choice I had made to join the Communist party in 1934." Another source says that Manuel Azcárate always had "great political influence" on his father, who "always collaborated closely with the Russians."

=== Civil War and World War (1936–45) ===
Azcárate married Ester Jiménez, who was depicted on a UGT poster during the civil war holding a work tool. They had two children, a girl and a boy. Azcárate fought in the Spanish Civil War (1936–39) with the 11th division of the Republican army from 1937 to the end of the war. After the fall of Barcelona in January 1939 Azcárate was sent to Madrid to help the propaganda campaign. He wrote later, "War weariness was written in the emaciated faces. The mood had become dark, sad and tragic. There was a generalized anti-communist resentment because many believed the communists to be responsible for the war's prolongation."

At the end of the war Azcárate went into exile in Paris. The PCE leadership left France after the Molotov–Ribbentrop Pact between Russia and Germany in August 1939 just before the outbreak of World War II. They moved to Mexico or the Soviet Union, safer countries that supported the Republic. Azcárate remained behind with the younger and lower-ranking PCE exiles in France, and in the summer of 1939 helped Jesús Monzón form the "Delegation of the PCE Central Committee in France", along with Carmen de Pedro, Manuel Gimeno and Jaime Nieto. They reorganized and rejuvenated the PCE in France, improvising policy as needed. During World War II (1939–45) Azcárate was in charge of organizing the Communist Party of Spain in the zone occupied by the Germans, and reorganized the Unified Socialist Youth (Juventudes Socialistas Unificadas).

=== Post-war politics and journalism (1945–98) ===
Azcárate wrote for El diario de la juventud junto, Mundo nuevo and Nuestra bandera, and for the clandestine Mundo obrero. He lived in Moscow from 1959 to 1964, where he helped write a history of the Communist Party of Spain and contributed to the book Guerra y revolución en España. Azcárate became a member of the PCE executive committee in 1964. From 1968 to 1981 Azcárate was head of the party's Department of International relations. He had to deal with the awkward question of peaceful coexistence with non-communist regimes, which the Soviet Union considered to be advantageous to socialist countries by helping anti-imperialist movements while avoid the risk of war. The PCE could not, however, accept that this meant abandoning the struggle against Franco's regime in Spain. In 1973 Azcárate praised the contribution the USSR had made towards détente, but said the PCE must fight all attempts to confuse détente with maintenance of the status quo, "wherever they may come from, even from our friends." The communist parties of Western Europe must cooperate to develop détente and eliminate the "systems of blocs".

Azcárate returned to Spain in 1976. On 22 December 1976 he was arrested along with Santiago Carrillo and other PCE members. Azcárate ran for election as a deputy for the province of León in 1977 in the first general elections after the return to democracy, but did not win. Azcárate said in a 1977 statement to Radio Free Europe that only Eurocommunism lay outside the two blocs, a position that the French and Italian communist parties did not share. In a March 1979 interview in Encounter Azcárate said,

In any case we already have a number of major US bases on our territory, and we have an agreement with the US covering military matters. The Spanish Communist Party does not question either—we accept them. We propose to do nothing to weaken America's strategic position. We do not want to change the existing balance between the United States and the Soviet Union. ... NATO has created a zone of security in Western Europe which shields those countries which are not members of the alliance. We therefore enjoy indirect protection against Soviet intervention. This is a positive fact about NATO.

Azcárate led a project by the group called the renovadores to introduce democracy into the PCE, which took effect after he had been expelled. In November 1981 Azcárate was among the group of PCE leaders who were expelled from the Central Committee of the party for their criticism of Carrillo's policy of sanctions. Carrillo himself was forced to resign after the 1982 elections. Azcárate began working for the newspaper El País in the early 1980s as a columnist and analyst for the international section. In his last days he composed an essay of more than fifty pages on his father (Semblanza de Pablo de Azcárate y Flórez, 1890–1971), dated May 1998.

Manuel Azcárate Diz died from cancer on 24 August 1998 in a clinic in Madrid at the age of 81.

== Publications ==
- Ibárruri, Dolores; Manuel Azcarate; et al. (1960). Historia del Partido Comunista de España (versión abreviada) (in Spanish). Warsaw: Ediciones "Polonia".
- Sandoval, José; Manuel Azcárate (1963). Spain, 1936–1939. Non Green, translator. London: Lawrence & Wishart.
- Cortezo, Jaime; Manuel Azcárate; Miguel Boyer; et al. (1976). Programas económicos en la alternatíva democrática (in Spanish). Barcelona: Anagram, DL.
- Azcárate, Manuel (1976). preface. Mi embajada en Londres durante la Guerra Civil Espanola. By Azcárate, Pablo de (in Spanish). Barcelona: Editorial Ariel. p. 402.
- Ibárruri, Dolores; Manuel Azcárate (1977). Guerra y revolución en España: 1936–1939. Progreso.
- Azcárate, Manuel (1977). El Encuentro: diálogo sobre el diálogo. Editorial Laia. p. 103. ISBN 978-84-7222-878-8.
- Azcárate, Manuel; Fernando Claudin (1979). Marc Abeles; Charles-Albert Ryng (eds.). L'Europe de l'Atlantique à l'Oural. Collection Dialectiques interventions (in French). Paris: F. Maspero. p. 138. ISBN 2-7071-1102-3.
- Azcárate, Manuel (1980). Interrogantes ante la izquierda (in Spanish). Marc Abeles, Charles-Albert Ryng, interviews. Barcelona: Ediciones 2001.
- Azcárate, Manuel (1981). Vías democráticas al socialismo. Ayuso. p. 299. ISBN 978-84-336-0193-3.
- Azcárate, Manuel (1982). preface. Le Mouvement communiste à la croisée des chemins. By Schaff, Adam (in French). Paris: Éditions Anthropos, impr. J. Enfer. p. 228. ISBN 2-7157-1054-2.
- Azcárate, Manuel (1982). La crisis del eurocomunismo. Primera plana (in Spanish). Barcelona: Argos Vergara. p. 345. ISBN 84-7178-425-4.
- Azcarate, Manuel; Étienne Balibar; Blandine Barret-Kriegel; Michel Beaud; [etc.] (1983). Christine Buci-Glucksmann (ed.). La gauche, le pouvoir, le socialisme: hommage à Nicos Poulantzas. Politiques (in French). Paris: PUF. p. 376. ISBN 2-13-037918-4. ISSN 0398-7922.
- Azcárate, Manuel (1986). La izquierda europea (in Spanish). Madrid: Ediciones El País.
- Azcárate, Manuel (1994). Derrotas y esperanzas. La República, la Guerra Civil y la Resistencia. Colección Andanzas (in Spanish) (2 ed.). Barcelona: Tusquets. p. 357. ISBN 84-7223-818-0.
- Azcárate, Manuel (1998). Luchas y transiciones : Memorias de un viaje por el ocaso del comunismo (in Spanish). Madrid: El País.

== Sources ==
- Alba, Víctor (1983-01-01). The Communist Party in Spain. Transaction Publishers. ISBN 978-1-4128-1999-2.
- Bolloten, Burnett (1991). The Spanish Civil War: Revolution and Counterrevolution. Univ of North Carolina Press. ISBN 978-0-8078-1906-7.
- Calandri, Elena; Varsori, Antonio; Caviglia, Daniele (2014-11-26). Détente in Cold War Europe: Politics and Diplomacy in the Mediterranean and the Middle East. I.B.Tauris. ISBN 978-1-78076-108-4.
- Eaton, Samuel D. (1981). The Forces of Freedom in Spain 1974–1979: A Personal Account. Hoover Press. ISBN 978-0-8179-7453-4.
- "Manuel Azcárate muere en Madrid a los 81 años". El País (in Spanish). Madrid. 1998-08-25.
- Ortiz, Javier (November 2000). "Jesús Monzón". Página abierta (in Spanish).
- Ribeiro De Meneses, Filipe (2003-09-02). Franco and the Spanish Civil War. Routledge. ISBN 1-134-55408-7.
- Sánchez Cervelló, Josep; Agudo, Sebastián (2015-04-23). Las Brigadas Internacionales: Nuevas perspectivas en la historia de la Guerra Civil y del exilio. Publicacions Universitat Rovira I Virgili. ISBN 978-84-8424-363-2.
- Segura, Julio (1998-09-09). "En recuerdo de Manuel Azcárate Diz". El País (in Spanish). Madrid.
- Waller, Michael; Courtois, Stéphane; Lazar, Marc (1991). Comrades and Brothers: Communism and Trade Unions in Europe. Psychology Press. ISBN 978-0-7146-3421-0.
