= Unión Nacional Española =

Spanish anti-Francoist organization (1942–1945)

- Unión Nacional Española
- Abbreviation: UNE
- Formation: 1942
- Dissolved: June 1945
- Purpose: Anti-Francoism, resistance against the German occupation of France
- Headquarters: near Montauban, France
- Affiliations: Communist Party of Spain (PCE)

The Spanish National Union (Spanish: Unión Nacional Española, UNE) was an anti-Francoist organization created near Montauban (France) in 1942, promoted by the Communist Party of Spain PCE in order to group forces to fight against the Francoist dictatorship, while contributing to the struggle against the Nazi occupation in France. It was dissolved in June 1945.

== History ==
In the summer of 1942, the leadership of the PCE in France, headed by Jesús Monzón, created an organization similar to the Spanish Democratic Union (Unión Democrática Española) of Mexico, which would frame all anti-Francoist forces, both republican and monarchist. It was constituted under the name Spanish National Union in a secret meeting held at a farm located a few kilometers from Montauban, which received the code name "Grenoble Congress."

In the spring of 1943, Monzón arrived in Madrid to, along with several collaborators, prepare "the formation meeting of the Junta Suprema de Unión Nacional (JSUN) with socialists, republicans, and libertarians in September 1943." Despite the controversy over its existence (for some researchers and communist leaders, such as Santiago Carrillo, who considered it an invention of Monzón), its existence has been verified, having room in it "not only for communists but also for all those anti-Francoists, even if they were closer to conservative groups, monarchists, or Carlists; the important thing was their opposition to the dictatorial regime."

In August of the following year, a clandestine meeting was held in San Antonio de la Florida, near Madrid, to establish the UNE inside Spain. It was attended by representatives of the PCE, some libertarians, and some socialists, including Sócrates Gómez, but the latter refused to participate. Despite this, the following month the leadership of the PCE interior, controlled by the leadership in France, published a manifesto titled "Appeal of the Junta Suprema de Unión Nacional" (Llamamiento de la Junta Suprema de Unión Nacional) primarily addressed to the non-Francoist Spanish right, which stated:

Franco and Falange are not only the enemies of the Spanish people and of the organizations we represent; they have also betrayed and injured the interests of all those they managed to drag behind them by lying to them with solemn promises of national salvation and patriotic aggrandizement.

On November 16, 1943, the UNE board reported that it had contacted "two prominent personalities of the Spanish Catholics"—Manuel Giménez Fernández and, through him, it was rumored that José María Gil-Robles, in Portugal, who had met in Seville with Jesús Monzón and his second-in-command Apolinario Poveda, traveling from southern France—to fight against the Francoist regime, supposedly dominated by Nazi Germany. For this, it was necessary to "root out the unjustified fear of some conservative people that leads them to suicidal inactivity, and on the other hand, avoid the extemporaneous excesses of some revolutionary people susceptible to producing attitudes in conservative circles from which only Franco benefits to the detriment of all." The agreement provided for the formation of a government of "national union" (historian Fernández Rodríguez specifies the formation of the JSUN) that would call elections for Constituent Cortes which would decide the form of government, whereby the PCE once again distanced itself from the government of Juan Negrín and the Second Spanish Republic (Segunda República Española), as had happened two years earlier.

At that time, Jesús Monzón already directed de facto both the PCE in France and in the interior, but like other leaders in exile, and despite traveling frequently to Spain, he had a very optimistic view of the political situation. He was convinced, according to Hartmut Heine, that "Spain had entered a pre-revolutionary stage and that the slightest impulse from the outside would provoke a popular insurrection and the desertion of the vast majority of Franco's allies to the ranks of the UNE." As an "external impulse," Monzón thought of a frontal attack on the Franco-Spanish border by Spanish members of the maquis integrated into the Spanish Guerrilla Association (Agrupación de Guerrilleros Españoles). Some of the middle cadres in the interior tried to convince him that he was wrong, but Monzón expelled them from the party, and no member of the national commission that directed the PCE in the interior disagreed with this proposal, which would lead to the disaster of the Invasion of the Val d'Aran in October 1944.

Given the anti-communist attitude of almost all the Spanish Republican exile, which would be integrated into the Spanish Liberation Junta (Junta Española de Liberación JEL) , besides the PCE, only individuals from other political sectors joined the UNE on an individual basis. The Spanish National Union promoted the guerrilla movement and, in 1944, it came to have 21 groups distributed as follows:

- 10 from the PCE
- 6 from the PSUC
- 2 from the CNT
- 2 from the Izquierda Republicana
- 1 from the PSOE

The political bureau of the PCE, whose members were distributed between Mexico and the USSR, held Jesús Monzón responsible for the fiasco of the Invasion of the Val d'Aran and also questioned the political strategy represented by the Spanish National Union UNE. Furthermore, the imminent victory of the Allies in the war had caused its raison d'être to disappear, as a moderate alternative to prevent Spain from actively participating in the war on the side of the Axis powers was no longer necessary when their defeat was so close. Thus, the UNE was officially dissolved on June 25, 1945, through a declaration by its supreme board in France—of which General Riquelme was a member. The following month, its Catalan counterpart promoted by the PSUC, the National Alliance of Catalonia (Aliança Nacional de Catalunya), was also dissolved.

The UNE had two publications: Pueblo Español (Spanish People), a newspaper for the Unity of all Spaniards against Franco and the Falange, and Unidad Reconquista de España (Unity Reconquest of Spain), the spokesperson for the 241st brigade, 186th Division of Guerrillas at the Service of the National Union.

== See also ==
- Opposition to Francoism
- Jesús Monzón
- Invasion of the Val d'Aran
- Second Spanish Republic in exile

== Bibliography ==
- Heine, Hartmut (1983). La oposición política al franquismo. De 1939 a 1952 [The political opposition to Francoism. From 1939 to 1952]. Grijalbo: Crítica. ISBN 84-7423-198-1.
- Fernández Rodríguez, Carlos (2004). "Madrid, ciudad clandestina" [Madrid, clandestine city]. Cuadernos de historia contemporánea (26): 127–142. ISSN 0214-400X.
