= Vicente López Tovar =

Spanish civil war soldier

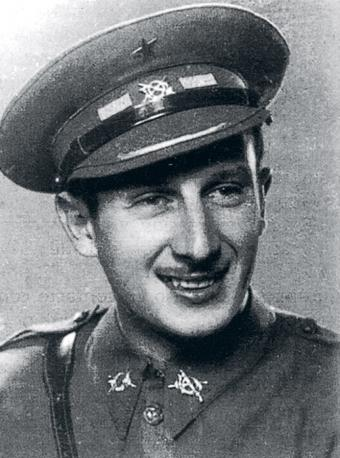
- Born: 15 September 1908; La Habana, Cuba
- Died: 26 December 1998 (aged 90) Toulouse, France
- Buried: Toulouse
- Allegiance: (Spain) Second Spanish Republic; Free France
- Branch: Spanish Republican Army; French Resistance
- Service years: 1936–1944
- Rank: Colonel
- Conflicts: Spanish Civil War; World War II: French Resistance; Invasion of Val d'Aran

Vicente López Tovar (15 September 1908 – 26 December 1998) was a photographer, Spanish soldier, politician and Maquis (World War II) fighter. He fought for the Republicans in the Spanish Civil War, for the French Resistance in World War II, and led a failed invasion of Spain in 1944 to oust Francisco Franco. After the Liberation of France Lopez Tovar was decorated with the Legion d'honneur and the Croix de Guerre. A street is named after him in Toulouse, France.

== Invasion of Aran Valley ==
On 19 October 1944, López Tovar led a force of exiled anti-Franco guerrilla fighters from the Unión Nacional Española (UNE), a military organization formed by the Communist Party of Spain but that included monarchists and other political denominations, across the Pyrenees mountains into the Aran Valley. The force consisted of 4,000 or 5,000 fighters, depending on the source. The objective was to establish a foothold in Spain from which to launch a full-scale invasion to overthrow Franco. The political leadership of the anti-Franco movement intended to make the city of Vielha a provisional capital that would give the movement legitimacy and thereby attract the financial and military backing of the Allied Powers for a larger operation. In his memoir, López Tovar writes that he was against the operation because of the lack of equipment and preparation.

The invasion was a failure. Franco was aware of the impending arrival of the troops and pursued a scorched earth strategy that left the UNE with little to capture in the valley outside of the city of Vielha. The guerrillas captured some villages defended by the Guardia Civil, but Franco sent reinforcements of 50,000 regular army troops over the Port de la Bonaigua and through the Vielha tunnel to defend the city. López Tovar was forced to hastily retreat back into France across the Pont de Rei.

== See also ==
- Santiago Carrillo

== Bibliography ==
- Engel Masoliver, Carlos (2005) Historia de las Brigadas Mixtas del Ejército Popular de la República, 1936-1939 Almena Ediciones ISBN 978-84-96170-19-3
- López Tovar, Vicente (1986) Biografía de Vicente López Tovar, coronel de los guerrilleros españoles en Francia. Manuscrito inédito, Toulouse (consultada la edición en francés: Autobiographie, Toulouse, 1991)
- Martínez de Baños, Fernando (2007). El Maquis. Una cultura del exilio español. Delsan Ediciones.
- Pons Prades (1976) Españoles en los maquis Eds. Y Distribuciones
- Sánchez Agustí, Ferran (1998) [1999]. Maquis a Catalunya. De la invasió de la vall d'Aran a la mort del Caracremada. Lérida: Pagès Editors. ISBN 978-84-7935-612-5
- Sánchez Agustí, Ferran (2001) Maquis y Pirineos Lleida: Ed. Milenio ISBN 978-84-89790-69-8
