= Euskadi Roja =

- 1934 issue of Euskadi Roja
- Founded: March 1933
- Ceased publication: 1950
- Political alignment: Communist
- Language: Spanish, Euskera
- Headquarters: San Sebastian, Bilbao, Barcelona, Paris
- Circulation: 45,000 (1937)

Euskadi Roja or Euzkadi Roja ('Red Euskadi') was a newspaper published by the Basque-Navarre Federation of the Communist Party of Spain. Parts of the newspaper were printed in the Basque language.

Euskadi Roja replaced an earlier party organ in Vizcaya, Bandera Roja. Initially, Euskadi Roja was published weekly from Bilbao. The first issue came out in March 1933. Notably, this was the first time the communist movement used the term 'Euskadi' for the Basque Country (a term that had exclusively been used by the nationalist movement). Towards the end of 1935 the newspaper was moved to San Sebastián. As the Spanish Civil War broke out and San Sebastian fell, the newspaper moved back to Bilbao. On December 2, 1936, it was converted into a daily newspaper. As of February–March 1937 Euskadi Roja had a daily circulation of 45,000–48,000. Apart from being circulated in Basque Country, Euskadi Roja was read in Santander and Asturias.

At the time, Euskadi Roja was considered one of the Spanish communist publications of higher quality. Ramón Ormazabal and Ricardo Urondo served as directors of Euskadi Roja.

After the fall of Bilbao, the newspaper re-appeared in Barcelona as a weekly. Euskadi Roja continued publication in exile in France after the war, as the central organ of the Communist Party of Euskadi with Ormazabal as its director. It was printed at the Croissant printing company, and had its office at 8, avenue Mathurin-Moreau, Paris. The newspaper was banned in France, along with the Communist Party of Spain. The ban came into effect on October 27, 1950.
