= Invasion of Val d'Aran =

Military operation

- Part of Aftermath of the Spanish Civil War and Spain during World War II
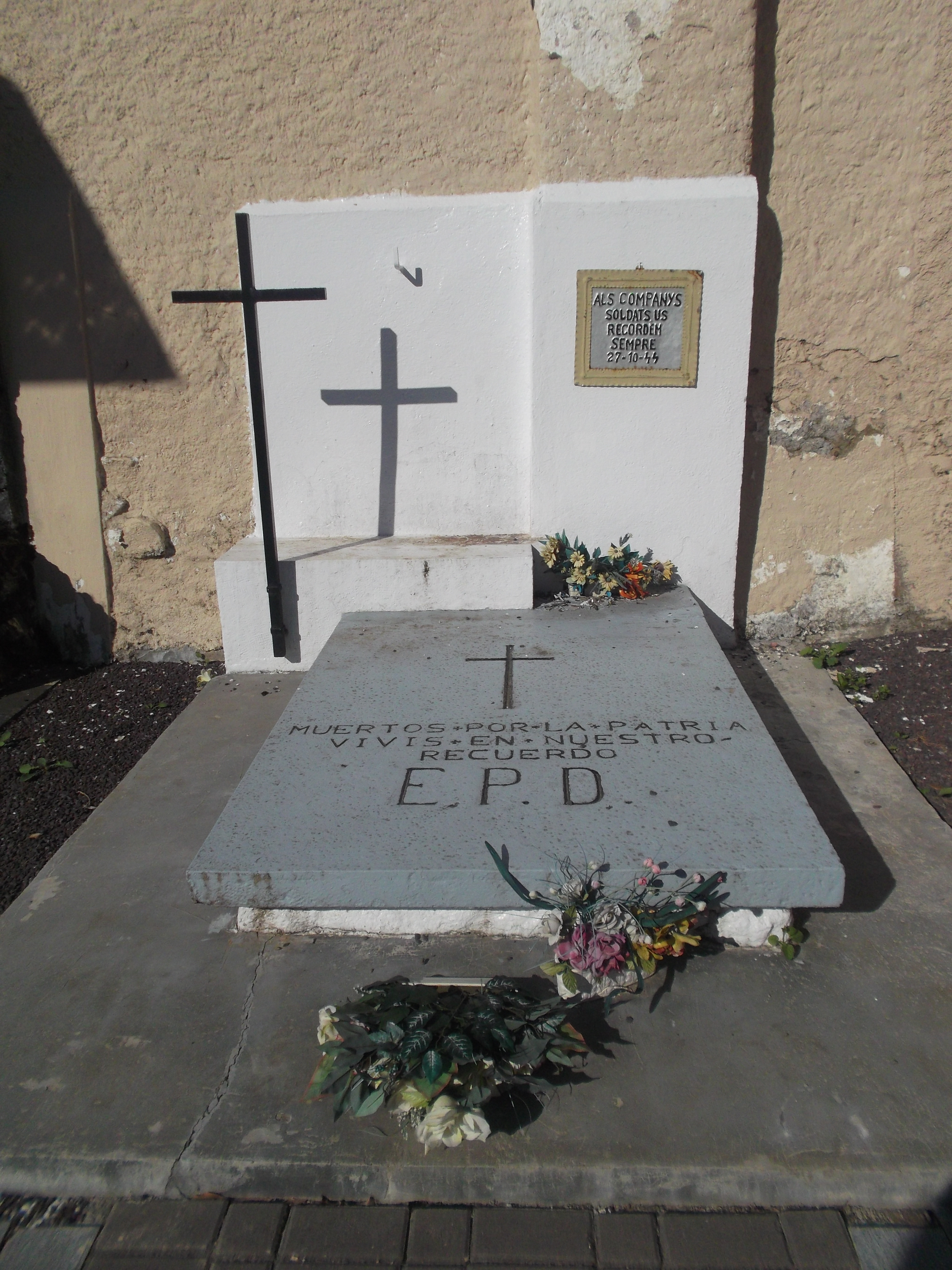
- Grave of the soldiers of the Francoist army killed during the invasion, cemetery of Vielha.
Date	19–24 October 1944
Location	Val d'Aran, Catalonia, Spain
Result	Francoist victory

Belligerents
(Francoist Spain) Spanish State	(Second Spanish Republic) Unión Nacional Española (sp): PCE; PSUC; CNT; Republican Left; PSOE

Commanders and leaders
José Moscardó; Rafael García Valiño; Juan Yagüe	Vicente López Tovar

Strength
50,000 men	4,000 to 7,000 men

Casualties and losses
248 dead	588 dead 800 captured

The Invasion of Val d'Aran, known under the code name Operación Reconquista de España ("Operation Reconquest of Spain"), was a military operation launched in October 1944 by the Unión Nacional Española (antifrancoist) (UNE). In October 1944, with the Spanish Civil War over and the Axis powers in World War II in retreat, guerrilla fighters loyal to the Republic tried to conquer Val d'Aran in Catalonia and establish a provisional Republican government presided over by Juan Negrín in order to later overthrow the dictatorship of Francisco Franco. The invasion, led by communist militant and French resistance member Vicente López Tovar, managed to overrun a number of Civil Guard outposts and take over several hamlets in the high areas of Arán, but was eventually repelled by the Francoist army, led by General José Moscardó, the defender of the Alcázar during the civil war.

Moscardó established his headquarters at Vielha, the main administrative center of the valley, and, supported by heavy artillery, made it impossible for the insurgents to advance through the Port de la Bonaigua pass and onto the lowlands beyond. The guerrillas were also beaten off at Salardú, where they suffered a number of casualties.

According to historian Geneviève Dreyfus-Armand, the UNE was a "structure of a large alliance, (which) united not only Communists, but also Spaniards of different political alignments – Socialists, Republicans or Anarchists – who the dispersion of their organizations and the silence of their leaders pushed into joining the only fighting structure organised against Nazism".

== Popular culture ==
- "The Silent War" (2019, original title: Sordo), Spanish movie by Alfonso Cortés-Cavanillas.

== See also ==
- Spanish Maquis

== Bibliography ==
- Juliá, Santos (coord.) (2005). Víctimas de la Guerra Civil. Barcelona: Planeta de Agostini. ISBN 84-8460-333-4.
- Boya-Busquet, Mireia; Cerarols-Ramirez, Rosa (13 February 2015). "Women Narration: Land, Gender and Oral Memory. The Forgotten History of the Maquis at Aran Valley". Journal of Alpine Research. 103–4 (103–4). doi:10.4000/rga.2650. hdl:10230/44651. ISSN 0035-1121.
