= Jesús Larrañaga =

Basque communist union leader (1901–1942)

Jesus Larrañaga Churruca
- Born: 17 April 1901; Urretxu, Spain
- Died: 21 January 1942 (aged 40); Madrid, Spain
- Cause of death: Execution by firing squad
- Occupations: Metalworker, Trade Union leader
- Known for: Civil War army commissioner

Jesus Larrañaga Churruca (17 April 1901 – 21 January 1942) was a Basque communist union leader who became one of the military leaders during the Spanish Civil War (1936–39). He went into exile after the fall of the Republic to the Francoist forces, but later returned to Portugal. He was arrested, handed over to the Spanish and executed by firing squad.

== Early years ==
Jesus Larrañaga Churruca was born on 17 April 1901 in Urretxu, Gipuzkoa in the Basque Country. His father was a building contractor and his mother took in ironing. Two of his brothers were Jesuits at the seminary of Javier, near to Pamplona. He studied at the seminary for several years and was an excellent student, but was expelled for rebelling against discipline.

== Union activism ==
Larrañaga started work as a metalworker at the wagon-making factory at Beasain, Gipuzkoa, which had 2,000 workers. He joined the Juventud Nacionalista (Nationalist Youth) and the Solidaridad de Trabajadores Vascos (Basque Workers' Solidarity) trade union. He organized a strike at his factory, for which he was dismissed. He moved to San Sebastián, and in 1926 had to emigrate to France due to his hostility to the dictatorship of Miguel Primo de Rivera. Larrañaga settled in Boucau, where he became acquainted with communist ideas. He returned to the Basque Country in 1927, joined the local Metallurgical Union of the Unión General de Trabajadores (UGT), and joined the Spanish Communist Party (Partido Comunista Español, PCE). He was placed in leadership roles in the union, and was elected to the Gipuzkoa Provincial Committee of the PCE.

Larrañaga was taken into in custody just before the mutiny of the garrison at Jaca in December 1930, and was released from prison in February 1931. When the Second Spanish Republic was proclaimed he was elected secretary of the local CGT federation, and played a central role in the many strikes that took place in Gipuzkoa. In the 1932 party congress in Seville he was elected a member of the Central Committee. That year he was sent to Moscow by the party to get advice on a question of procedure. In 1933 he founded the Euskadi Roja (Red Basque Country), which he wrote, printed and sold on the streets. In 1935 Larrañaga participated in the illegal congress at which the Communist Party of Basque Country (Partido Comunista de Euzkadi) was formed. He was elected to the Central Committee and Bureau of the party. Larrañaga was one of the candidates of the Popular Front (Frente Popular) in the elections of February 1936, in which a Republican and a socialist were elected.

== Spanish Civil War ==
After the attempted Spanish coup of July 1936, Larrañaga was appointed war commissioner in the newly formed San Sebastián Defense Board. The Madrid government later named him general war commissioner for the Basque Country. In July 1936 General Francisco Llano de la Encomienda commanded the Republican Army of the North, which included the forces of Catalonia and those of the northern coast along the Bay of Biscay. In this sector the regional groups refused to form a united front. Larrañaga was the commissar in the Basque Country, the anarchist Francisco Martínez was commissar in Asturias and the socialist Antonio Somarriba was commissar in Santander. The Basques distrusted Larrañaga as a communist, while the communists distrusted him as a Basque. The Basque government of José Antonio Aguirre managed to organize an army of 25,000 men, nominally part of the Army of the North, led by Larrañaga. In early December 1936 this army participated in a southward push towards Villarreal. They had very little air support, and their only field guns were pulled by oxen, but the troops at this stage had high morale.

The Basque Government refused to formally accept Larrañaga's appointment until May 1937. During this period the PCE had a difficult relationship with the Basque nationalist authorities. At a PCE meeting on 27 July 1937 Larrañaga attacked the Basque government, creating a storm of criticism from the Republicans. He had to clarify that he spoke as a communist militant, not as army commissioner. On 4 August 1937 he was confirmed as Deputy Commissioner of the North Brigade of the army. After the fall of the northern sector later in 1937, Larrañaga was evacuated to France. He found his way back to Spain, and was arrested and tried by his own comrades in Alicante, but was acquitted. He continued to fight on the Aragon front. In Aragon he was a member of the Military Political Commission of the Central Committee of the Party. After the collapse of the Republic he managed to escape and go into hiding in Boucau.

== Last years ==
At the start of the World War II (1939–45) in September 1939 Larrañaga was in Paris. He sailed from Le Havre to Puerto Plata in the Dominican Republic in the French ship De La Salle. He went from there to Havana, where he held intensive planning sessions with Vicente Uribe and Julián Grimau. He moved on to New York, where he met Ramón Ormazábal. Late in September 1941 he sailed for Europe on the Portuguese ship Gaza with some companions. He had volunteered for the almost suicidal mission of rebuilding the structure of the party in Spain.

The Portuguese police arrested Larrañaga, Manuel Asarta Imaz and others in Lisbon on 5 October 1941 and handed them over to the Spanish on 8 October 1941. They were held by the Political Social Brigade (Brigada Político Social) for twenty days, then imprisoned in the Porlier jail, the Madrid provincial prison. Jesús Larrañaga and three others were processed by a military tribunal on 19 January 1942 headed by colonel Félix Navajas García, charged with joining the rebellion and breaking the Law of State Security. No mitigating statements were heard. They were sentenced to death and shot on the morning on 21 January 1942. (Note: The communists who were executed with Larrañaga were Isidoro Diéguez Dueñas, Manuel Asarta Imaz, Jesús Girabau Estévez, Jesús Gago Correas, Francisco Barreiro Barciela and Eladio Rodriguez González.) Larrañaga was thirty-nine years old.

== Publications ==
- Por la libertad de Euzkadi, dentro de las libertades de España! Discurso pronunciado en el mitin de clausura del pleno ampliado del C.C. del Partido comunista de España, celebrado en el cine Tyris, de Valencia, en 7 de marzo de 1937 (in Spanish), Partido comunista de España, 1937. Includes extracts from the speech of Aurelio Aranaga.

== Sources ==
- Arrozarena, Cecilia (1 January 2003). El roble y la ceiba: historia de los vascos en Cuba. Txalaparta. ISBN 978-84-8136-357-9.
- Beevor, Antony (23 August 2012). The Battle for Spain: The Spanish Civil War 1936-1939. Orion Publishing Group. ISBN 978-1-78022-453-4.
- Estornés Zubizarreta, Idoia (2015). "Jesús Larrañaga Churruca". Auñamendi Eusko Entziklopedia (in Spanish).
- Garai, Juan Ramon (30 January 2009). "Homenajean en Madrid a Jesús Larrañaga". Gara (in Spanish). Archived from the original on 20 June 2015.
- Garai Bengoa, Juan Ramón (2008). Celestino Uriarte. Txalaparta. ISBN 978-84-8136-524-5.
- R.D. (13 August 2007). "DIEGUEZ DUEÑAS, Isidoro". Los de la sierra (in French).
- Thomas, Hugh (2001). The Spanish Civil War. Modern Library. p. 597. ISBN 978-0-375-75515-6.
