= United Gipuzkoa =

United Gipuzkoa Guipúzcoa Unida
- Founded: 1977
- Dissolved: 1977
- Ideology: Conservatism; Regionalism
- Political position: Right-wing

United Gipuzkoa (Spanish: Guipúzcoa Unida, GU) was a Basque Country-based party alliance led by the People's Alliance ahead of the 1977 Spanish general election.

== Member parties ==
- People's Alliance (AP)
- Spanish Falange of the JONS (FE–JONS)
