= Ramón Ormazábal =

Basque communist politician

Ramón Ormazabal Tife
- Born: 1910; Irun, Gipuzkoa, Spain
- Died: 5 July 1982 (aged 71–72); Bilbao, Biscay, Spain
- Occupation: Politician
- Known for: EPK secretary general

Ramón Ormazábal Tife (1910 – 5 July 1982) was a Basque communist politician who was a founding member and leader of the Communist Party of the Basque Country (Euskadiko Partidu Komunista, EPK).

== Early years: 1910–36 ==
Ramón Ormazábal Tife was born in Irun, Gipuzkoa, in 1910. He began working in Hendaye at the age of twelve, where he soon joined communist circles. He became a communist activist in Irun. After the failed insurrection of 1934 he had to flee Pamplona. When the Spanish Communist Party (Partido Comunista Español), PCE) was formed as a national organization in the spring of 1935 Ramón Ormazábal settled in Biscay. There he was a founding member of the Communist Party of the Basque Country (Euskadiko Partidu Komunista, EPK) in 1935. He was against the autonomy of the EPK from the PCE proposed by Juan Astigarrabía, who was expelled from the party for "nationalist deviation".

== War Years: 1936–45 ==
When the Spanish Civil War (1936–39) began Ormazábal became a member of the Basque Defense Council before it was formally constituted by the Basque government. He was the director of the journal Euzkadi Roja (Red Basque Country), the organ of the Spanish Communist Party. At the end of the civil war he was arrested in 1939 in Alicante. A year later he escaped from prison in Valencia and went into exile, first in the United States and then in South America, where he became a communist organizer.

== Later career: 1945–82 ==
After World War II (1939–45) Ormazábal moved to France in 1946, and continued to work for the party in exile and clandestinely in Spain, He was arrested in 1962, accused of being one of the leaders of the strikes that year in Gipuzkoa and Biscay, and sentenced to 20 years in prison. He was one of ten members of the FUL who were sentenced at a summary court martial on 21 September 1962.

Ormazábal was released in 1970 after eight years and made secretary general of the party in France, holding this office until the 1977 Congress of the Communist Party of the Basque Country in 1977. He was replaced by Roberto Lertxundi as secretary general of the EPK at the party's third congress, which was held in the spring of 1977 in Bilbao. The congress took place after the PCE performed dismally in the elections in Basque Country. Lertxundi, a physician and former member of the armed Euzkadi Ta Azkatasuna (ETA) group, was thought to be more in touch with the electorate. Ormazábal was elected president at this congress, and was reelected president in the congress of 1981. He died from a heart attack in Bilbao on 5 July 1982 at the age of 72.

== Sources ==
- Boggs, Carl; Plotke, David (1980). Politics of Eurocommunism. Black Rose Books Ltd. ISBN 978-0-919618-31-2.
- Christie, Stuart (2002). My Granny Made Me an Anarchist: The Cultural and Political Formation of a West of Scotland "baby-boomer". ChristieBooks.com. ISBN 978-1-873976-14-2.
- Patxo Unzueta (1982-07-06). "Falleció Ramon Ormazábal, presidente del Partido Comunista de Euskadi". El País (in Spanish). Bilbao.
- "Ramón Ormazabal Tife". Auñamendi Eusko Entziklopedia (in Spanish).
