= Zarratón =

- Municipality
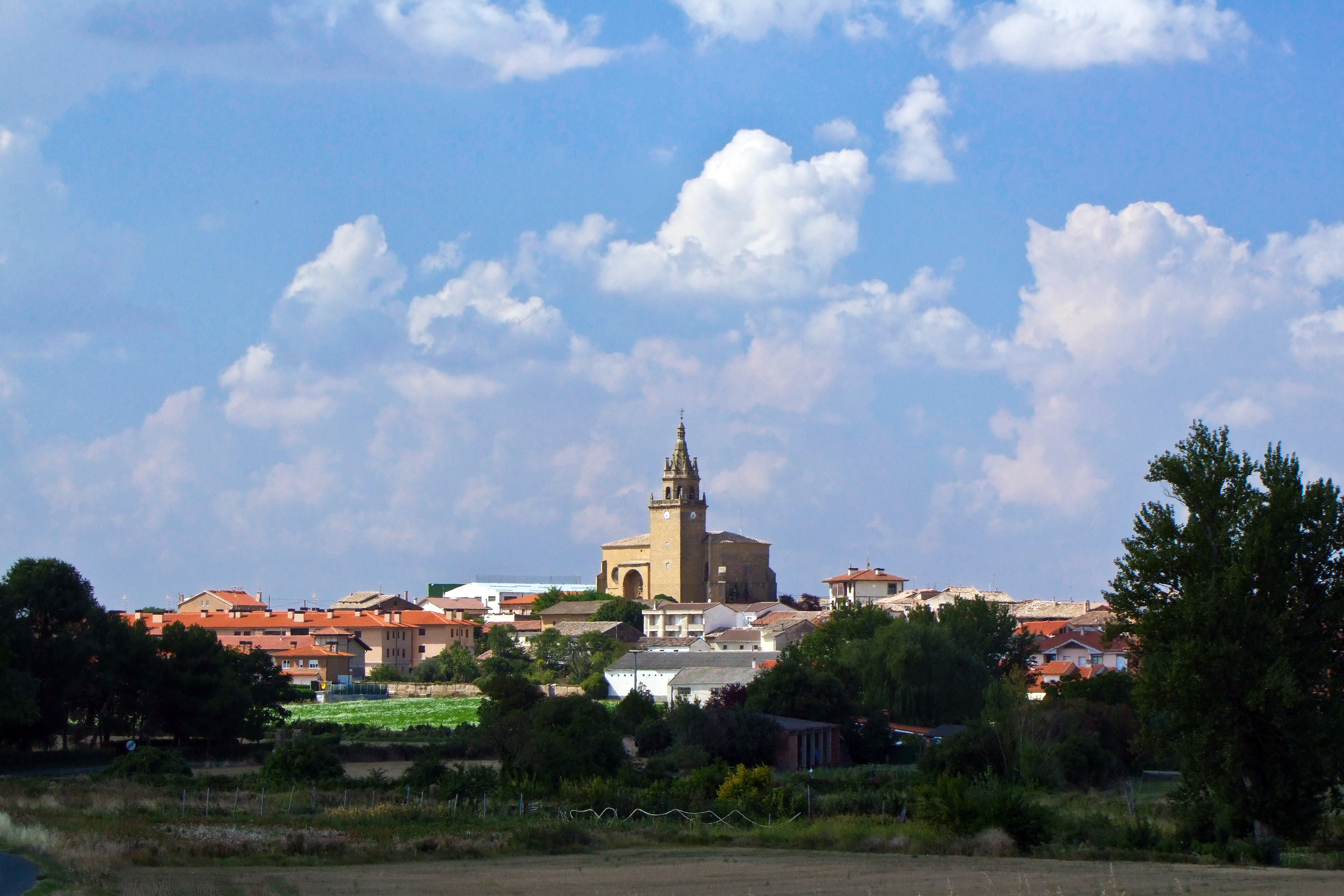
- Skyline of Zarratón

- Coat of arms

- Location within La Rioja, Spain Location within Spain
- Coordinates: 42°30′56″N 2°52′56″W
- Country: Spain
- Autonomous community: La Rioja
- Comarca: Haro

Government
  - Mayor: Víctor Manuel Manso (PSOE)

Area
  - Total: 18.69 km^{2} (7.22 sq mi)
- Elevation: 562 m (1,844 ft)

Population (2025-01-01)
  - Total: 254
- Postal code: 26291
- Website: www.zarraton.es

Zarratón is a village in the province and autonomous community of La Rioja, Spain. The municipality covers an area of 18.69 square kilometres (7.22 sq mi) and as of 2011 had a population of 318 people.
