= Rodezno =

- Municipality
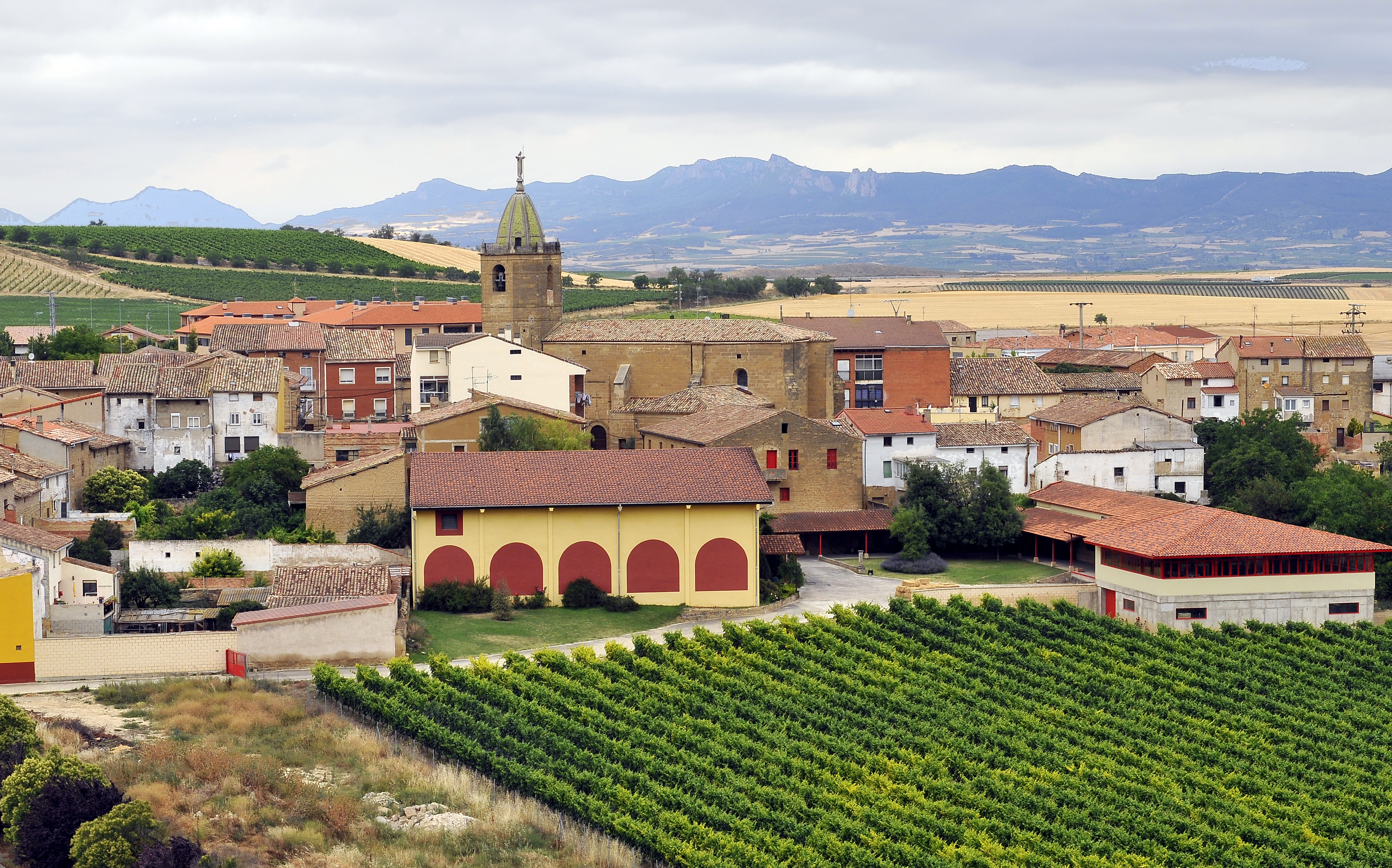
- Skyline of Rodezno

- Coat of arms

- Location within La Rioja, Spain Location within Spain
- Coordinates: 42°31′25″N 2°50′40″W
- Country: Spain
- Autonomous community: La Rioja
- Comarca: Haro

Government
  - Mayor: Nicolas Perez Gimilio (PSOE)

Area
  - Total: 14.30 km^{2} (5.52 sq mi)
- Elevation: 545 m (1,788 ft)

Population (2025-01-01)
  - Total: 230
- Demonym(s): torcido, da
- Postal code: 26222
- Website: www.ayuntamientorodezno.org

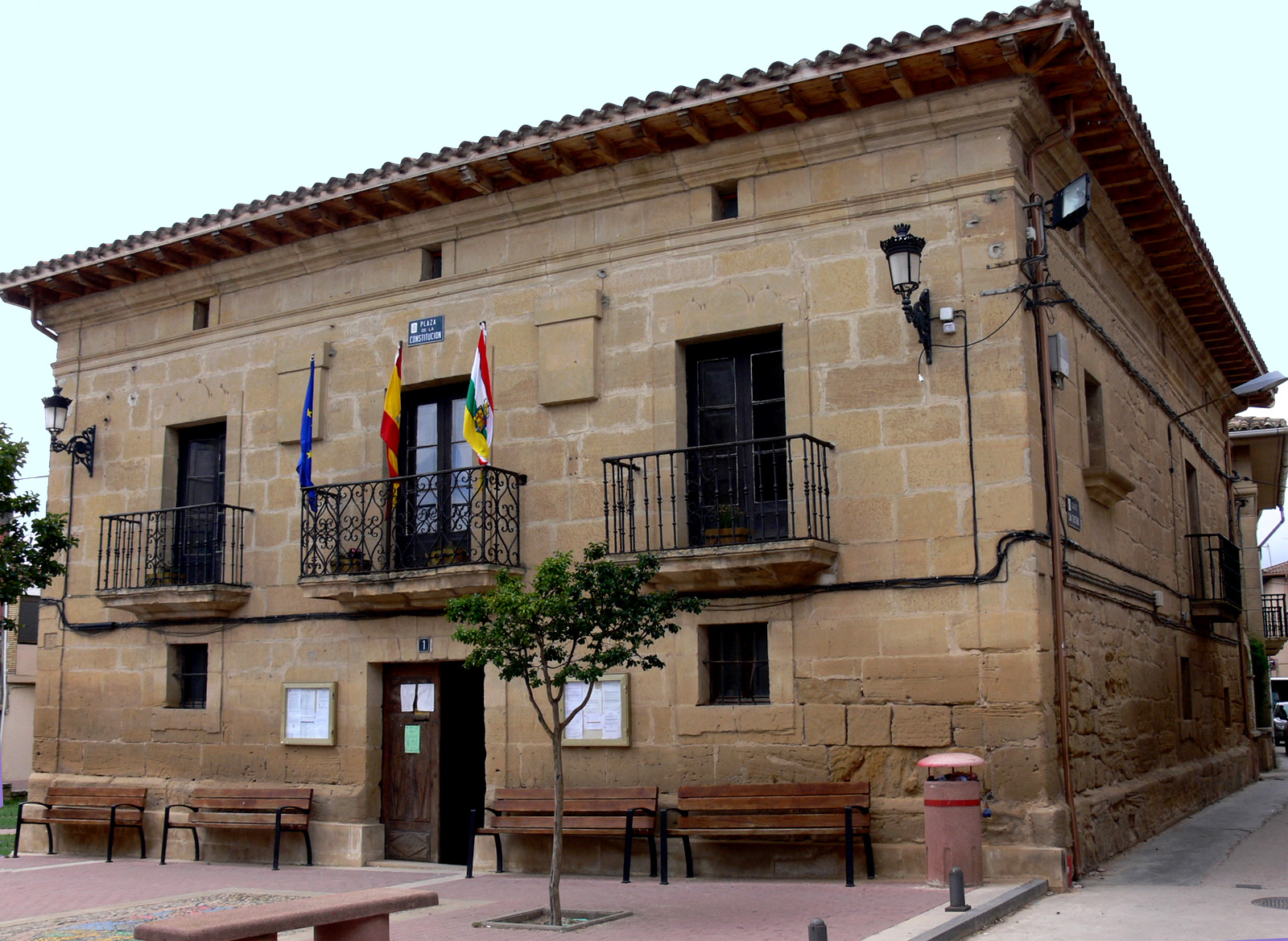
Municipal office

Rodezno is a village in the province and autonomous community of La Rioja, Spain. The municipality covers an area of 14.3 square kilometres (5.5 sq mi) and as of 2011 had a population of 316 people.
