= Communist Party of the Basque Country =

Communist Party of the Basque Country Euskadiko Partidu Komunista
- Leader: Jon Hernández
- Founder: Jesús Larrañaga
- Founded: July 1935
- Newspaper: Hemen eta Orain
- Youth wing: Gazte Komunistak
- Ideology: Communism; Marxism-Leninism; Republicanism; Federalism
- National affiliation: Communist Party of Spain
- Regional affiliation: United Left–Greens (1986–2012); Ezker Anitza (since 2012); United Left of Navarre (since 1986)
- Basque Parliament: 1 / 75 Within Sumar

Website
- www.pce-epk.org

The Communist Party of the Basque Country (Basque: Euskadiko Partidu Komunista, Spanish: Partido Comunista de Euskadi) is the federation of the Communist Party of Spain (PCE) in the southern Basque Country (the Basque Autonomous Community and Navarre).

PCE-EPK publishes Hemen eta Orain. The general secretary of PCE-EPK is Jon Hernández. The youth organization of PCE-EPK is Gazte Komunistak (Communist Youth in the Basque).

== See also ==
- Euskadi Roja
- Communist Party of the Basque Homelands
