= Manuel Muñoz Martínez =

Spanish politician (1888–1942)

Manuel Muñoz Martínez (13 March 1888 - 1 December 1942) was a Spanish army officer and Republican politician. He was a diputado in the three legislatures of the Cortes (parliament) of the Second Spanish Republic. After escaping to France at the end of the Spanish Civil War in 1939, he was later extradited from Vichy France on the orders of Maréchal Pétain, tried and executed in Francoist Spain.

== Biography ==
He was born in Chiclana de la Frontera to Mariana Martínez Garillo and Agustín Muñoz Rodríguez, a soldier and municipal judge. He made a career in the army, being trained at the Academia de Infantería de Toledo which he left as a second lieutenant assigned to the Pávia garrison in Cádiz. There he was promoted to lieutenant. In 1912, he was assigned as a captain to the Ceuta Regiment. The same year, he was wounded during a military operation, was repatriated and assigned again to the Pávia Regiment. He left for Madrid, in order to complete some machine gun courses. These exercises, carried out once World War I began, were witnessed by King Alfonso XIII, who instructed the Minister of War to include Muñoz in a military commission attached to the French army that was to remain in France during World War I. He married María Dolores Pérez Martín-Arroyo; they had three children, Manuel, Agustín and María Dolores. After the War, he was assigned to the Cádiz Regiment, where he rose to the rank of commander in 1926. He was a supporter of the attempted coup d'état in 1926 against the aristocratic dictator Miguel Primo de Rivera. He was an active freemason with the adopted name "Yo" and played a significant national role as such.

=== Political career ===
With the end of the monarchy, he worked for the Partido Republicano Autónomo in Cádiz, and with the advent of the Second Spanish Republic took part in the constitution of the Partido Republicano Radical-Socialista. He was elected as a diputado for Cádiz. After a split, he joined the Partido Radical Socialista Autónomo and in October 1933 the Partido Republicano Radical Socialista Independiente. In the November 1933 elections, he rejoined the Republican coalition. In 1934, he was elected to the Consejo Nacional de Izquierda Republicana' (National Council of the Republican Left) constituent assembly. In February 1936, he was elected again as a diputado for Cádiz with the Izquierda Republicana in the Frente Popular (Popular Front). He was not regarded as a noteworthy politician, although he had threatened José Calvo Sotelo with death in the Cortes.

==== Director of General Security ====
In July 1936, José Alonso Mallol, the director of the Dirección General de Seguridad (Directorate of General Security, DGS) resigned at the failure of the Republican state to control public order. Muñoz replaced him in the role. The DGS building was largely empty, Muñoz regarded the security forces as unreliable and political parties and unions were independently arranging searches, arrests, and killings. Muñoz and the new Ministro de Gobernación (effectively Minister of the Interior), Sebastián Pozas Perea, agreed in desperation to try and get the left-wing parties and unions to support the DGS, instigating the Comité Provincial de Investigación Pública (CPIP) on 4 August. CPIP was a mixture of thirty left-wing politicians and union members, dominated by anarcho-syndicalists and acting as provisional police officers with DGS credentials; some refused to work with regular police and declared their right to make security decisions on the spot. Tribunals with inexperienced staff were held but when those convicted were imprisoned, they were often later taken from prison and executed by criminals of the same lawless checas that the CPIP was means to replace but now carrying DGS authorisation. These systematic executions of prisoners were called sacas. Muñoz spoke to the leaders of the Confederación Nacional del Trabajo (CNT), the anarchosyndicalist trade union group, to try to get help to impose some order but failed. He then organised two armed groups mostly staffed by 'Assault Guards' of the Cuerpo de Seguridad y Asalto under CPIP auspices, nominally under his control, known as Los Linces de la Republica ('the Lynxes of the Republic') in the royal palace and the Escuadrilla del Amanecer ('Dawn Squad') operating from the DGS and more directly linked to Muñoz. The latter in particular became known for its ruthlessness and joining with checas in murders, robberies, and sex crimes. During this period, when his home town Chiclana was besieged by rebels, Muñoz's father was ordered to leave government buildings by es:Mariano Zapico, the civil governor (who was executed on 6 August). Eight of Munoz's family stayed with a friend before being arrested and imprisoned, first in Cádiz and then in Seville.

==== Incidents involving the transportation of prisoners ====
On 11 August, anarchists got wind of the railway transport of a few hundred right-wing detainees from the packed prison in Jaén to the prison at Alcalá de Henares. The civil governor of Jaén, Luis Rius Zunón, asked the director general of prisons in Madrid, Pedro Villar Gómez, if he could transfer some prisoners there as he wanted to avoid further bloodshed after the recent spate of murders of prisoners. The train was stoned along the way and eleven on board were killed at Atocha station.

On 12 August, another trainload of prisoners was stopped by anarchists at Santa Catalina Vallecas; they uncoupled the train and set up three machine guns. The Guardia Civil on duty were threatened if they did not leave. They received permission to do so by telephone from Muñoz. Nearly two hundred prisoners were then massacred by the anarchists. Muñoz later claimed that he was not informed of the plan to transport prisoners on 11 August and said that he allowed the Guardia Civil to leave to avoid forces of order being seen to be overwhelmed by armed civilians.

On 21 August, he authorised two CPIP militias to interrogate prisoners at the Cárcel Modelo (Model Prison) in Madrid after rumours that Falangist prisoners, with the support of some prison guards, were planning an escape. An anti-right-wing crowd had built up outside, demanding the release of Republic-supporting prisoners, and those prisoners themselves demanded to be released. Many in the prison targeted by the militias were simply abused and robbed. The following day, after an air-raid by rebel bombers, the crowd and prisoners grew more vociferous and prisoners rioted. A machine-gun attack - presumably set up by the militia outside - killed six right-wing prisoners and injured others. Pozas arrived with the city councillor, Ángel Galarza Gago, to little effect, followed by Muñoz who phoned round the political parties to ask for help to calm the crowd and went to ask the Prime Minister, José Giral, for permission to free the common criminals. However, two hundred had already been freed by Felipe Sandoval, a brutal checa leader. Over thirty inmates were then chosen by the militias from the prison records to be 'tried' and then murdered, including politicians and those in protective custody. When Muñoz returned and saw the situation, he went back to his office claiming illness.

With Madrid under increasing threat and provocation from the Nationalist forces, and Nationalist prisoners being murdered with increasing frequency in sacas, Muñoz authorised the evacuation of prisoners to Alcalá de Henares between October and November. On 6 November, the second of three evacuation convoys was stopped halfway at the village of Paracuellos del Jarama and the 55 prisoners shot. The killings would continue. In the afternoon, the cabinet of prime minister Francisco Largo Caballero agreed to move to Valencia as it was expected Madrid would fall to the Nationalist rebels. A Junta de Defensa of the capital and environs was to be established. Muñoz's last orders for the evacuation of about 8000 Nationalist prisoners before his departure were taken on by Segundo Serrano Poncela, effectively the acting DGS. It is unclear if Muñoz or his deputy, the police chief Vicente Girauta Linares, had signed the original orders or if Muñoz had simply drawn them up, but in the chaotic environment that followed, a spate of sacas followed Serrano Poncela's signed orders, with Poncela under the overall direction of Santiago Carrillo and his deputy José Cazorla Maure. At least 1000 rebel prisoners, possibly more than twice that number, were executed in November and December in what became known as the Paracuellos massacres; when Paracuellos del Jarama was overwhelmed, about 400 were killed at Torrejón de Ardoz. The largest number were killed on the 6 and 7 November. Muñoz's acquiescence in the face of armed groups led to him being described as "passive" or even involved, though some argue he was not sufficiently supported by his more-senior colleagues, Pozas and Galarza.

==== Following resignation ====
He relinquished his role on 30 December 1936 and was promoted by decree to the rank of lieutenant-colonel the following day. Thereafter he kept a lower profile. Muñoz learned of the murder of his father by Nationalists and the death of his 16-year-old son, Manolo, who succumbed to pulmonary tuberculosis after 11 months in the Prisión Provincial de Sevilla. His family had been taken to La Línea de la Concepción, where they were placed on a British ship which went to the Valencian port of Grao. The ship did not dock, but the remaining family was exchanged for a sister of Nationalist general Gonzalo Queipo de Llano and the children of the marquesses of Larios.

He went to Barcelona with his family, where he was appointed chairman of the board of directors of the Banco de Bilbao. He went on to represent Izquierda Republicana, Manuel Azaña's party, in the Secretariat for Relations with Republican parties.

=== Exile, arrest, and execution ===
In 1939, he went into exile in France as a political refugee with his family, stopping first in Perpignan. He was helped by his first cousin, Charles Fol. In Paris, negotiations with Republican organizations to travel to Mexico failed. His family, supported by another relative - soldier and councillor Agustín Herrero Muñoz - returned to Spain from the south of France because the refugee camps were full, while he returned to a Paris refuge, in the company of the sister of Spanish philosopher María Zambrano. In June 1940, before the occupation of Paris by the Nazi Germany, he hid in the castle of Tréouguy, in Pont-l'Abbé, Brittany, where he was later arrested by the German military police at the request of the Spanish police, on 14 October 1940. He was transferred by the Gestapo to the Santé prison in Paris, where he spent almost a year. In January 1942, the Paris Court of Appeal granted his extradition, signed off by Maréchal Pétain in April. The German police handed him to the Spanish on 26 August 1942, and two days later he gave a statement to the Brigada Político Social de Madrid, the Francoist secret police. He was accused of being involved in the Paracuellos massacres and other killings of right-wingers and of being a "masón de alto grado" - a high-degree freemason, which was true. In September, he was sent to the Cárcel de Torrijos at 53 calle Conde de Peñalver. After appearing before the Council of War, he was shot in the Cementerio de la Almudena on 1 December 1942.
