= Marcelino Arana =

Spanish agronomist and plant breeder

Marcelino Arana Franco
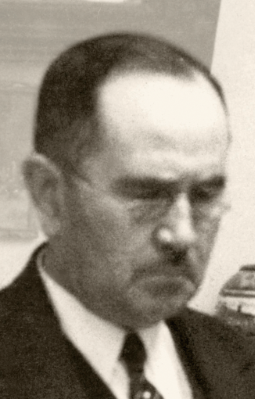
- Born: April 22, 1877; Herrera de Pisuerga, Palencia, Spain
- Died: November 26, 1936 (aged 59); Paracuellos del Jarama, Madrid, Spain
- Cause of death: Execution
- Occupation: Agronomist
- Known for: Dryland farming, cereal breeding, agricultural innovation

Marcelino de Arana y Franco (22 April 1877 – 26 November 1936), known as Marcelino Arana, was a Spanish agronomist and plant breeder, noted for his contributions to dryland farming, wheat breeding and agricultural reform. He founded the Instituto de Cerealicultura in Madrid and played a significant role in Spain’s agrarian development during the early 20th century.

== Early life and education ==
Arana was born in Herrera de Pisuerga to Santos Arana of Llodio and Mercedes Franco of Herrera de Pisuerga. His father trained as an agricultural technician at the Granja Modelo of Vitoria. Marcelino completed his secondary education at the Villacarriedo Escolapios College and then graduated as an agricultural engineer from the Escuela de Agricultura General in 1901.

== Career ==
=== Early work ===
Between 1902–1903 and 1908–1911, Arana worked at the Estación Enológica in Toro, combating phylloxera in the Toro wine-producing region. He also trained at the Estación Enológica in Haro and participated in the National Viticulture Congress in Pamplona (1912). From 1904 to 1908, he served at the Agricultural Institute in Palencia, collaborating with José Cascón on dryland farming techniques and teaching basic agriculture techniques to local agricultural workers.

=== Director of Agricultural Station in Zamora ===
In 1911, Arana became director of the Estación de Agricultura General in Zamora, where he remained for fifteen years. He conducted public lectures, improved native wheat varieties, and introduced foreign strains suited to Spain’s interior climate, including Italian varieties such as "Rieti", "Ardito", "Mentana", and "Senatore Cappelli", as well as the Canadian "Manitoba". Between 1918 and 1924, he developed a dry-farming method and patented some associated machinery, earning the Grand Cross of the Civil Order of Agricultural Merit from King Alfonso XIII in 1925.

=== Agrarian social action ===
Supportive of Miguel Primo de Rivera’s regime, Arana collaborated with the Somatén in Zamora and joined the Junta de Acción Social Agraria in Madrid in 1926. He helped resolve a centuries-long legal land ownership dispute in La Aldea de San Nicolás and facilitated the purchase of Guarrate by its residents, formerly subject to onerous lease contracts. He also co-authored studies with Gregorio Matallana Revuelta on the drainage of Laguna de La Nava. From 1927 to 1930 he was appointed to the National Assembly.

=== Instituto de Cerealicultura ===
In 1927, Arana was appointed director of the newly established Estación de Cerealicultura, which began operations in 1929 as the Instituto de Cerealicultura, headquartered at La Moncloa in Madrid.

The institute, one of the first cereal breeding centres in Spain, focused on wheat hybridisation, maize adaptation for dryland farming and wheat flour quality studies. Notable collaborators included Fernando Silvela Tordesillas, Ramón Blanco Pérez de Camino, Alonso Ruiz de Arcaute Ollo, and Juan Matallana Ventura. In these years Arana travelled several times to Italy in order to attend technical meetings at the International Institute of Agriculture and visit Italian cereal breeding centres, including those of Rieti and Modena.

== Later life and death ==
Promoted to the Consejo Agronómico in 1934, Arana conducted inspections across Spain's public agronomic centres and advocated for continued ministerial funding of the Galicia Biological Mission. He studied the introduction of sorghum and soy cultivation in Spain and delivered agricultural lectures via radio. Due to his Catholic and monarchist beliefs, he was purged from the Ministry of Agriculture in August 1936 and arrested in Madrid in November. He was executed during the Paracuellos massacres later that month.

== Legacy ==
Much of Arana’s experimental work records were lost during the Spanish Civil War as the premises of the Instituto de Cerealicultura were destroyed during the Siege of Madrid. His published works include technical reports, agricultural manuals, and radio lecture transcripts.

== Selected publications ==
- La viña nueva : los híbridos productores directos (1918)
- Nuevos métodos de cultivo en secano (1925)
- Instrucciones para el cultivo del maíz en secano (1931, 1932)
- El Instituto de Cerealicultura y los nuevos tipos de trigo (1934)
- Acerca de la soja (1935)
- Praderas naturales (1936)

== Honours ==
- Grand Cross of the Civil Order of Agricultural Merit (1925)

== See also ==
- Dryland farming
- Agriculture in Spain
- Nazareno Strampelli, Tito Vezio Zapparoli
