= Poncela =

Poncela is a Spanish surname. Notable people with the surname include:

- Enrique Jardiel Poncela (1901–1952), Spanish playwright and novelist
- Eusebio Poncela (1945–2025), Spanish actor
- Segundo Serrano Poncela (1912–1976), Spanish Republican politician, writer, literary critic, and essayist
