= Esplá =

Esplá is a Spanish surname. It may refer to

- Carlos Esplá (1895–1971), Spanish Republican politician and journalist.
- Óscar Esplá (1886–1976), Spanish composer
