= Federico Melchor =

Spanish journalist and communist politician

- Federico Melchor from Mundo Obrero 19 September 1985
- Born: Federico Melchor Fernández; 10 April 1915; Madrid, Spain
- Died: 11 September 1985 (aged 70); Madrid, Spain
- Occupation: Journalist
- Known for: Spanish Civil War communist leader

Federico Melchor Fernández (10 April 1915 – 11 September 1985) was a Spanish journalist and communist politician. He was one of the leaders of the Communist Youth Union of Spain. During the Spanish Civil War (1936–39) he was general director of propaganda in the government of Juan Negrín. He became a member of the Central Committee of the Communist Party of Spain.

== Life ==
=== Early years ===
Federico Melchor was born in Madrid on 10 April 1915. As a boy he spent time at the Casa del Pueblo. He became a militant in the youth organization of the Socialist Party. He was editor of the weekly paper Renovación. He became secretary of the Socialist Youth in Madrid. He became a member of the National Executive of the Socialist Youth of Spain (Juventudes Socialistas de España, JSE), and editor of Claridad. Writing in the 21 December 1933 issue of Rundschau, the German-language journal of the Communist International, Melchor said the Communist Party of Spain (Partido Comunista de España, PCE) organizations had tried to take leadership of the mass revolts that took place in Spain that month, and in some cases succeeded. According to the anarchist José Peirats this is completely untrue, and the communists gave no support to the revolts.

Melchor was selected for the JSE executive committee at the fifth congress held in 1934. He visited Moscow in February–March 1936 with Santiago Carrillo, José Laín Entralgo, Trifón Medrano Lherba, Felipe Muñoz Arconada and Juan Ambou. He returned via Austria and Switzerland. In 1936 Melchor, Carrillo, Laín and José Cazorla were socialist members of the national liaison committee for unification of the communist and socialist youth. The new organization, the Unified Socialist Youth (Juventudes Socialistas Unificadas, JSU), adhered to the Communist Youth International as a "sympathizer". The JSU committed itself to being a "new style" Popular Front youth movement as described by the Communist International.

=== Civil war ===
During the Spanish Civil War (1936-39) Melchor was a captain in the "October" militia battalion. He was appointed head of the forces of Security, Assault and the National Guard under Santiago Carrillo, Councillor of Public Security in the Madrid Defense Council. Other key posts in Carrillo's department were held by Luis Rodríguez Cuesta (secretary of the Council), Segundo Serrano Poncela of the General Directorate of Security (Dirección General de Seguridad, DGS), Fernando Claudín Pontes (Press Cabinet) and Alfredo Cabello (Emisión Radiofónica). All these men were either members of the PCE already, or would soon become members. The police squads formed by trade unions or political parties were replaced by full-time security forces that the communists dominated. Melchor transferred from the Spanish Socialist Workers' Party (Partido Socialista Obrero Español, PSOE) to the PCE in November 1936.

The PCE opposed socialization of industry, which the anarcho-syndicalist Confederación Nacional del Trabajo (CNT) supported. If the workers assumed control of the factories, that would run against communist policy of state ownership and would also weaken middle class support for Soviet foreign policy. Melchor outlined the official Communist Party position when he said, "We are not making a social revolution today; we are developing a democratic revolution, and in a democratic revolution, the economy ... cannot be launched into Socialist channels. If we are developing a democratic revolution and say we are fighting for a democratic republic, how can we attempt in the economic field to introduce methods of a totalitarian Socialist type?" He also noted that if foreign capital were not protected, that "would be an error in international relations because then England would decisively intervene against Spain not on our side but with Franco, because England has economic interests in our country to defend."

Under the government of Juan Negrín the Sub-secretariat of Propaganda was headed by Leonard Martín Echevarría of the Republican Left. Juan José Domenchina, also of the Republican Left, headed the Spanish Information Service. Melchor was made Director General of Propaganda. In January 1938 Melchor was replaced as undersecretary of propaganda by the architect Manuel Sánchez Arcas. The Left Republican Carlos Esplá became the Republic's first minister of propaganda. During the civil war Melchor was also secretary of the JSU militias, contributed to the daily Ahora, and directed the daily Trincheras. He escaped to France when the Republic fell in 1939.

=== Later years ===
In Paris Melchor edited the JSU journal Juventud. At the start of World War II (1939-45) he was expelled from France and sailed to Mexico. There he edited España Popular and the Boletín de Información Sindical of the Unión General de Trabajadores (UGT, General Union of Workers). He represented the JSU in Mexico. After the war he returned to Europe and joined the JSU executive. He was editor for Radio España Independiente in Bucharest. After returning to Paris he ran a PCE information bureau and the weekly Información Española. He returned to Spain clandestinely to direct Mundo Obrero before the PCE was legalized in 1977. He then directed the journal openly in Madrid. He died in Madrid on 11 September 1985 at the age of 70.

== Publications ==
Publications include:

- Melchor, Federico; Nacional, Juventud Socialista Unificada (España) Conferencia (1937). La joventut i la economia de guerra: discurs pronunciat en la Conferència Nacional de la Joventut a València. Edicions Joventut. p. 8.
- Melchor, Federico (1937). Organicemos la producción: un factor decisivo para la victoria : [informe pronunciado en la sexta sesión en la] Conferencia Nacional de Juventudes. p. 14.
- Melchor, Federico (1937). El Frente de la producción: una industria grande y fuerte para ganar la guerra. J.S.U. de España. Ediciones Alianza Nacional de la Juventud. p. 32.
- Melchor, Federico (1939). Movilización de la juventud contra la guerra. Ediciones Juventud de España. p. 29.
- Melchor, Federico (1945). Aportaciones a un programa de unidad y combate de la juventud antifranquista. Ediciones de "Juventud de España". p. 48.
- Melchor, Federico (1988). Crónicas de lucha. Ahora. p. 174. ISBN 978-84-404-1788-6.
- Melchor, Federico; Montalbán, Manuel Vázquez (1995). Los gallos de la aurora: crónica novelada de las vivencias de un joven del pueblo de Madrid en vísperas de la guerra. Juan Pablos editor. p. 146. ISBN 978-968-6454-27-7.
- Melchor, Federico (2010-01-01). Federico Melchor: testimonio de una vida : la Generación del 36 que se enfrentó al fascismo. Ediciones de Intervención Cultural. p. 313. ISBN 978-84-92616-70-1.

== Sources ==
- Bolloten, Burnett (1991). The Spanish Civil War: Revolution and Counterrevolution. Univ of North Carolina Press. ISBN 978-0-8078-1906-7.
- "Federico Melchor. Testimonio de una vida" (in Spanish). Federación Estatal de Foros por la Memoria. 2010-06-07.
- Fundación Pablo Iglesias (2015). "Melchor Fernández, Federico" (in Spanish).
- García, Hugo (2010). The Truth about Spain!: Mobilizing British Public Opinion, 1936-1939. Sussex Academic Press. ISBN 978-1-84519-332-4.
- Graham, Helen (1991-06-28). Socialism and War: The Spanish Socialist Party in Power and Crisis, 1936-1939. Cambridge University Press. ISBN 978-0-521-39257-0.
- Peirats, José (2011-08-01). The CNT in the Spanish Revolution: Volume 1. PM Press. ISBN 978-1-60486-597-4.
- Thomas, Hugh (2013-11-06). The Spanish Civil War: Revised Edition. Random House Publishing Group. ISBN 978-0-8041-5216-7.
- Volodarsky, Boris (2014-11-06). Stalin's Agent: The Life and Death of Alexander Orlov. Oxford University Press, USA. ISBN 978-0-19-965658-5.
