= Pontevedra Municipal Sports Hall =

Sports venue in Pontevedra, Spain

Pabellón Municipal de los Deportes
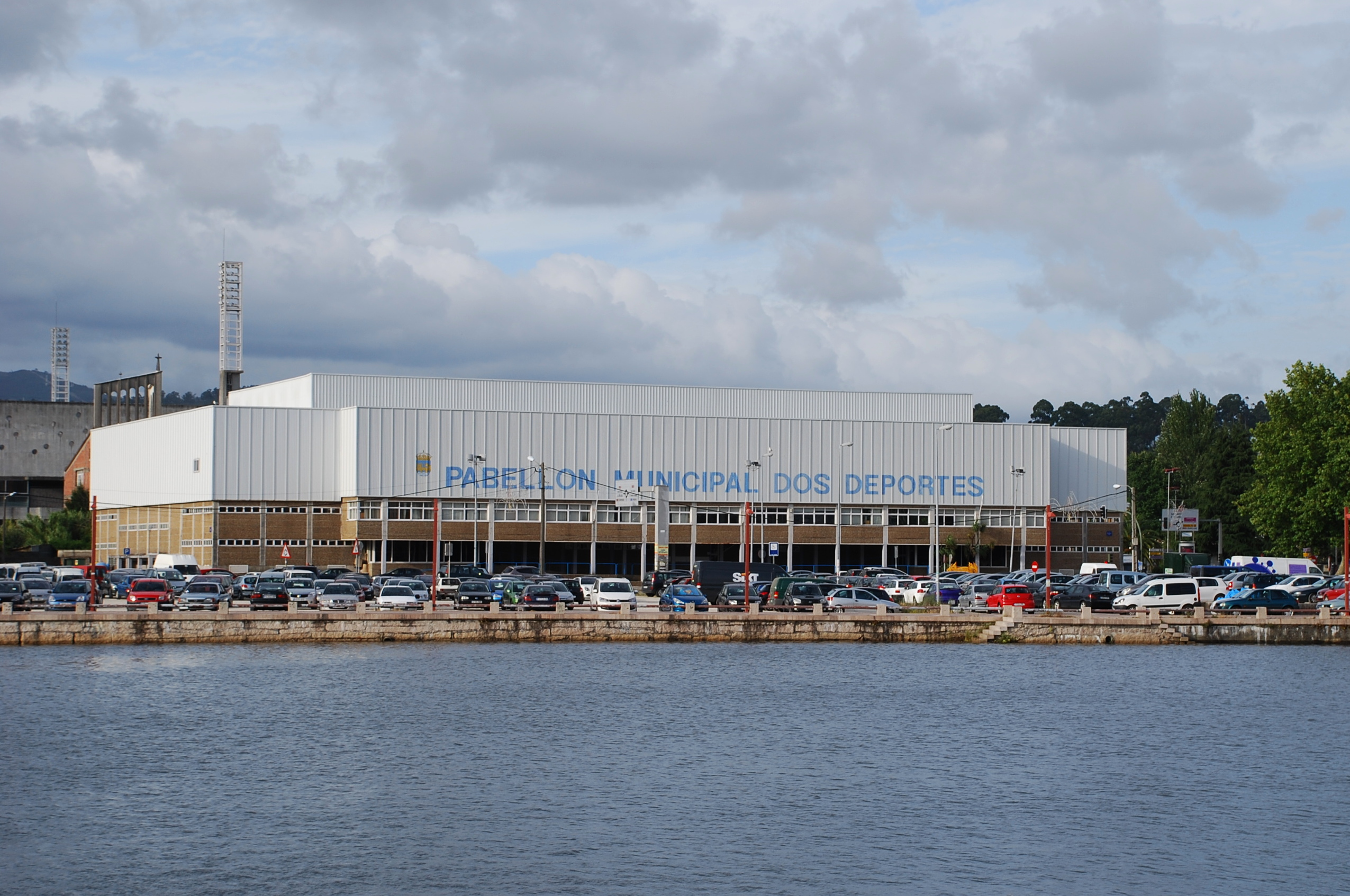
- Interactive map of Pabellón Municipal de los Deportes
- Full name: Pontevedra Sports Hall
- Location: Pontevedra, Spain
- Coordinates: 42.4366°N 8.6415°W
- Owner: City Council of Pontevedra
- Capacity: 4,000

Construction
- Built: 1965–1968
- Opened: 1968
- Renovated: 2016
- Architect: Alejandro de la Sota

Tenant
- SD Teucro Club Cisne Balonmano

The Pontevedra Municipal Sports Hall (Pabellón Municipal de los Deportes) is an arena in Pontevedra, Spain. It is primarily used for team handball and is the home arena of SD Teucro & Club Cisne Balonmano. The arena holds 4,000 people. It is located in the neighbourhood of O Burgo.

== History ==
The Sports Hall was designed by Alejandro de la Sota in 1964. Construction work began in 1965. It was inaugurated on 13 July 1968 by Juan Antonio Samaranch, National Delegate for Physical Education and Sports. A month later, during the celebrations of the Pilgrim Virgin, a concert was organised by Los Bravos, Los Silver Stones, Los Dobles and Karina with Los Pekes. The Sports Hall became operational in 1969. The first major competition to be held was the Latin Handball Cup in March 1969.

Since its inauguration, the Sports Hall has hosted concerts and different shows and important sporting events such as the Junior Handball World Championship in 1987 or the Handball King's Cup in 2005.

In 2022, an improvement project financed by the Higher Sports Council was presented with the replacement of the playing field, the paving of the building's perimeter, the rectification of the access ramps, as well as the renovation of the external railing and the electronic multi-sport score and time displays. In addition, solar panels will be installed on the roof to generate energy for self-supply.

The Sports Hall will also recover the original design by Alejandro de la Sota, replacing the roof added in 1986 with another similar to the one designed by the architect.

== Description ==
It is an outstanding example of contemporary Spanish architecture. De la Sota designed the interior of the building as a light-flooded box, with an elegant and delicate structure, which creates a weightless effect of the spatial mesh of the roof. The roof is supported by corbels, balanced like a scale. It has a flat and translucent surface, like a skylight. In 2016, the City Council of Pontevedra commissioned the renovation of the Sports Hall's roof to restore the original appearance of the exterior, which had been modified in 1986.

The whole effect was covered with thin panels, which formed the outer volume of the building. The façade is made of large prefabricated reinforced concrete panels assembled on site with minimal thickness. The building shows great subtlety in the design of the timber roof truss and small construction elements such as railings, handrails and parapets.

The building has a reinforced concrete structure and four lateral towers with stairs to access the upper part. The prefabricated concrete façade has a characteristic small pebble finish.

== Gallery ==
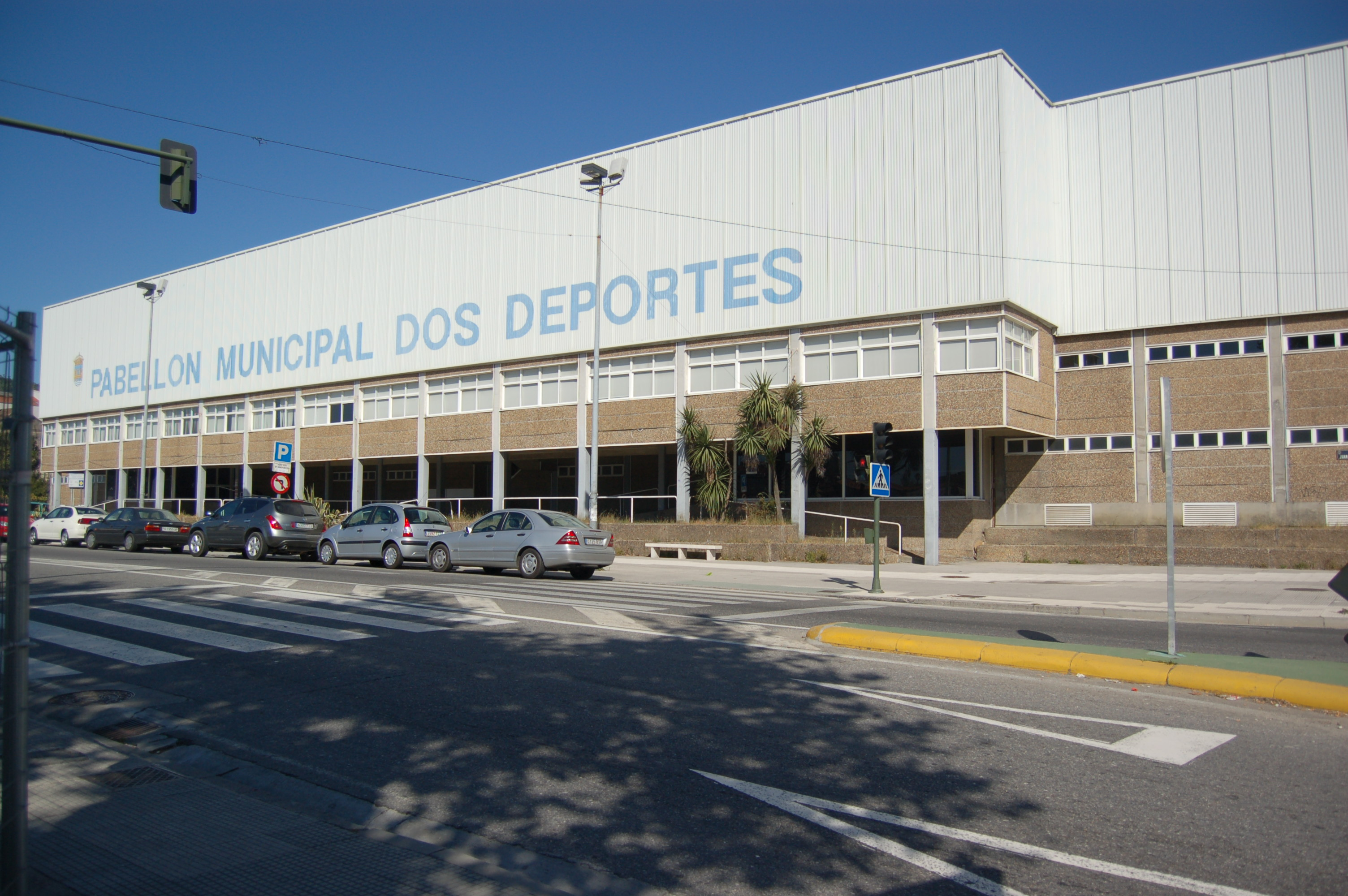
Façade

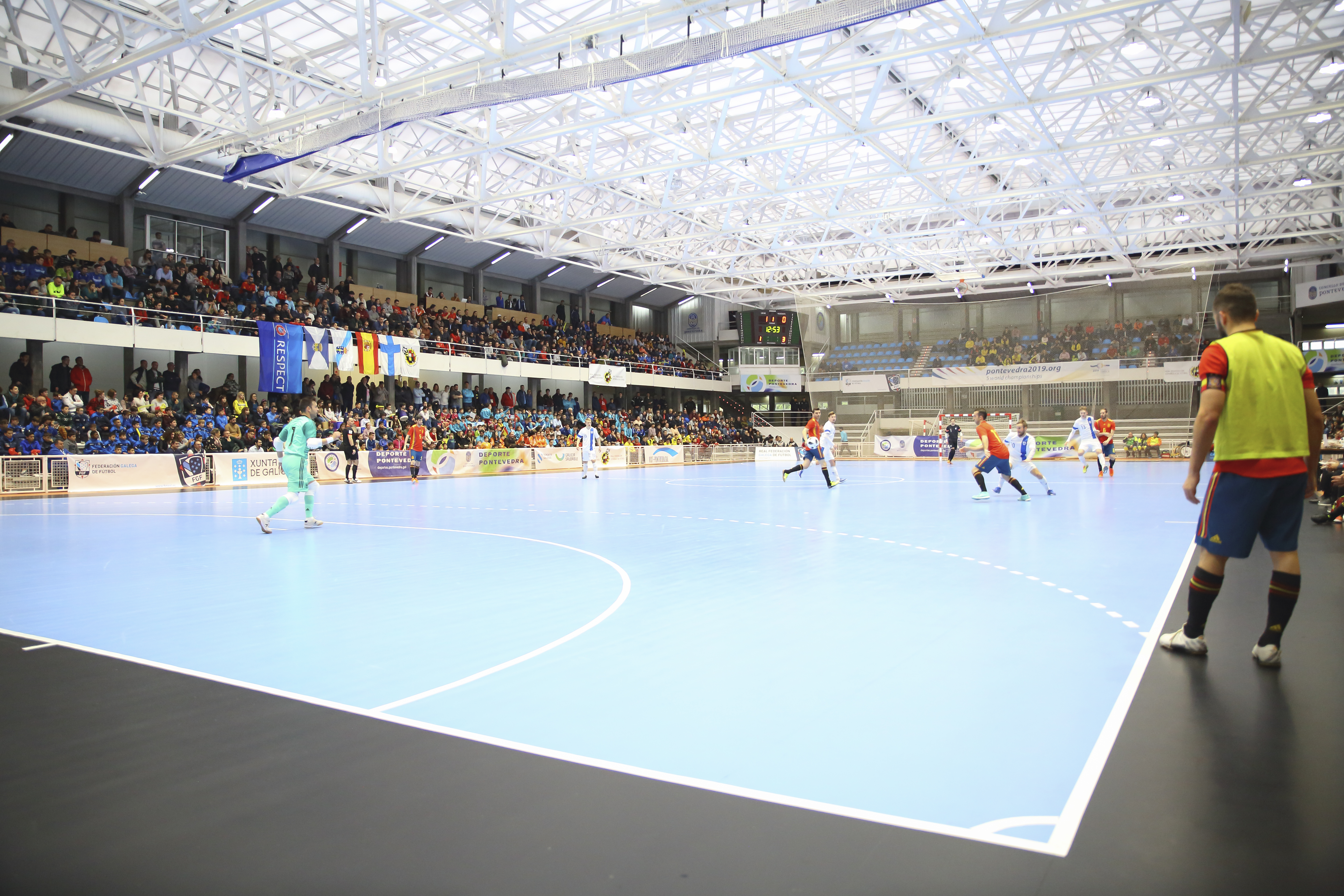
New translucent cover as in 1968

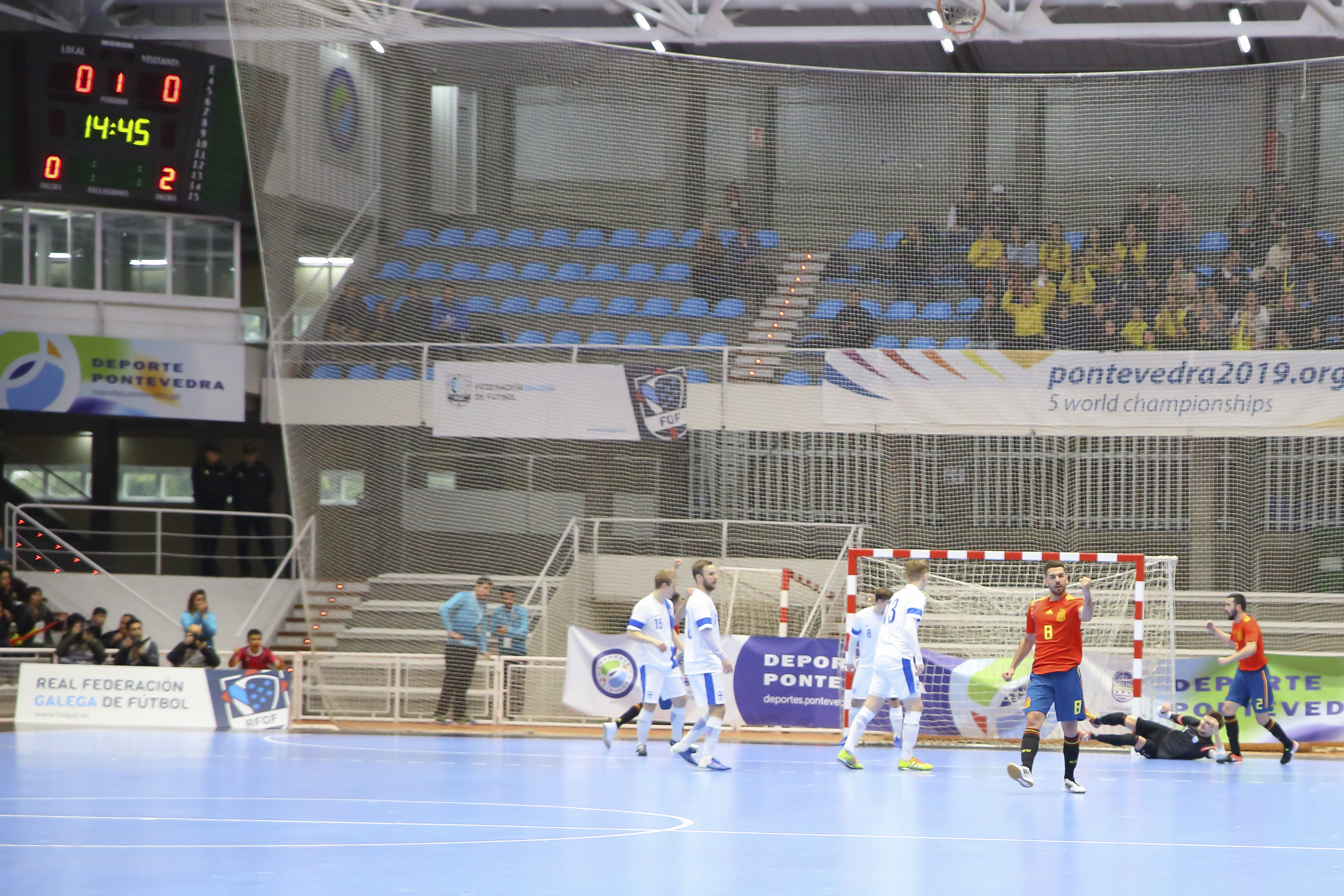
Interior of the Sports Hall in 2018

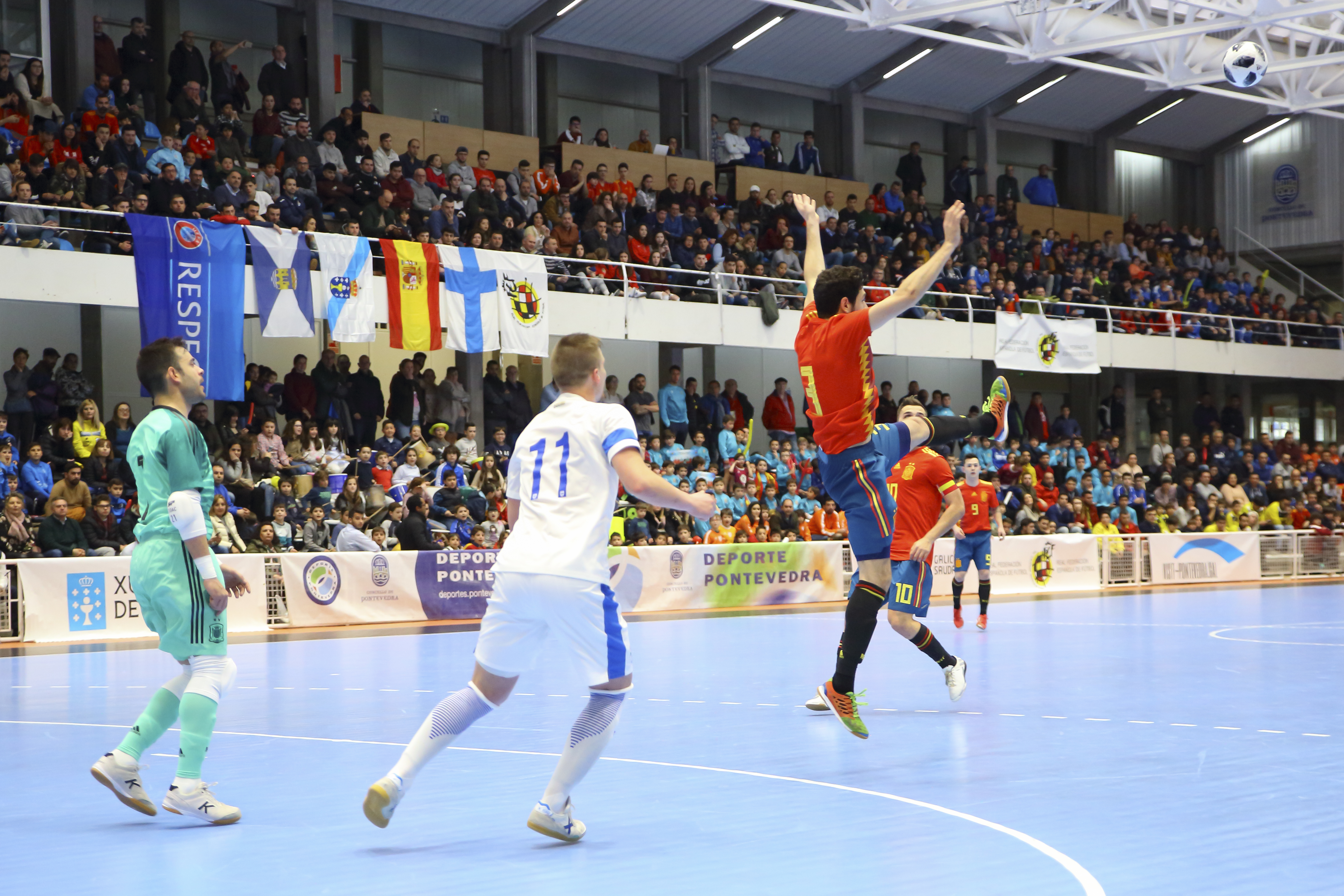
Futsal match in 2018

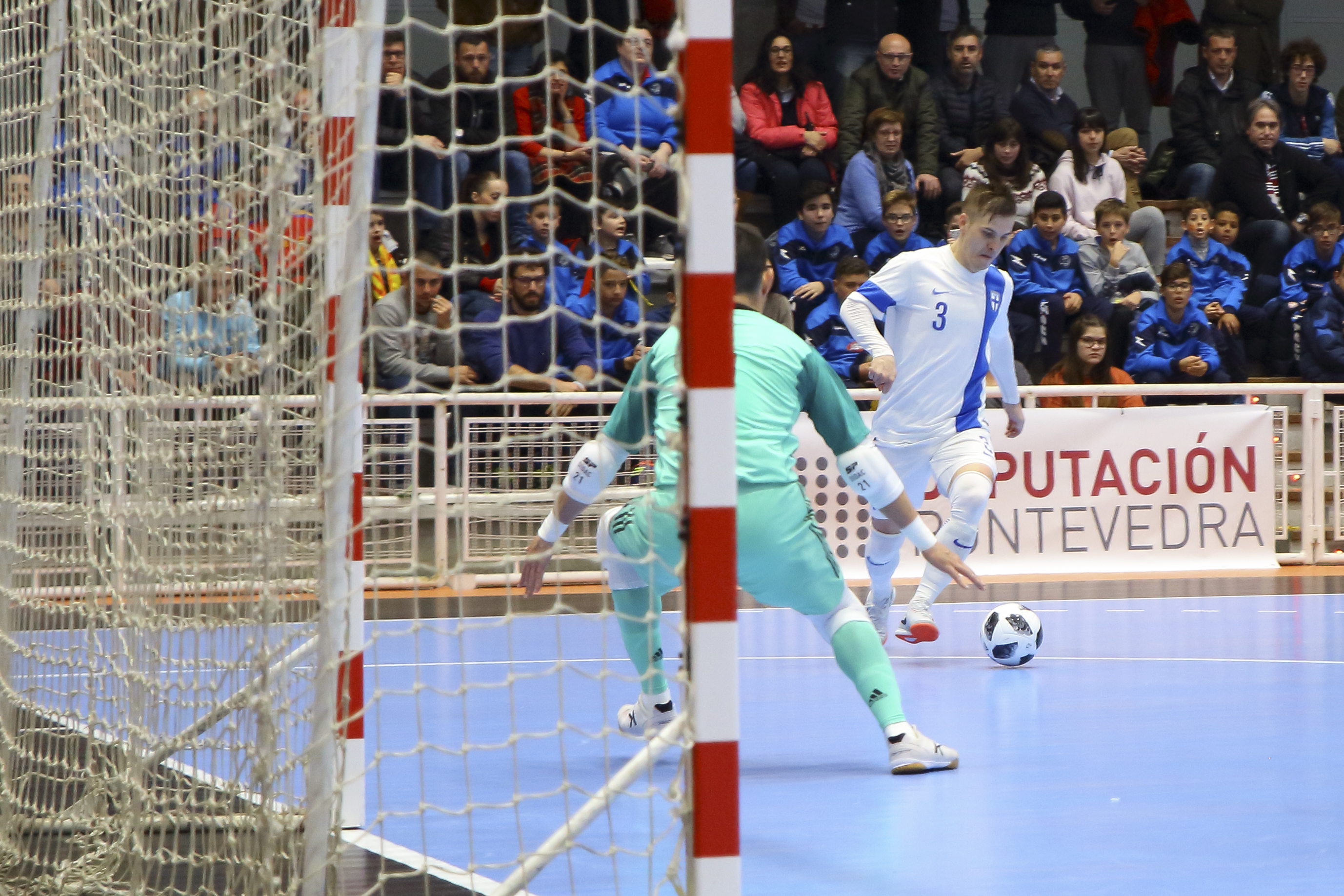
Goal

== Bibliography ==
- Aganzo, Carlos (2010). Pontevedra. Ciudades con encanto (in Spanish). Madrid: El País-Aguilar. p. 105. ISBN 978-8403509344.
- López Torre, Rafael (2015): Filgueira Valverde. Crónica de una alcaldía (1959–1968), Concello de Pontevedra, D.L.: PO 314-2015 (es)
- VV.AA.: Arquitectura Moderna en Asturias, Galicia, Castilla y León. Ortodoxia, Márgenes y Transgresiones (1998), C.García Braña y F. Agrasar Quiroga Ed. ISBN 84-85665-31-7

== See also ==
=== Related articles ===
- Alejandro de la Sota
- O Burgo
- Pontevedra Auditorium and Convention Centre

=== External links ===
- Docomomo Pabellón Municipal de Deportes de Pontevedra
- The Municipal Sports Pavilion returns to its original design
- Plans of the Sports Hall
