= José Cazorla Maure =

Spanish communist leader during the Spanish Civil War

- Born: 1903; Madrid, Spain
- Died: 8 April 1940 (aged 36–37); Madrid, Spain
- Cause of death: Execution by firing squad
- Occupation: Communist leader

José Cazorla Maure (1903 – 8 April 1940) was a Spanish communist leader during the Spanish Civil War (1936–1939). He was one of the leaders of the Unified Socialist Youth. For several months in 1936–1937, he was a member of the Madrid Defense Council in charge of public order. He was ruthless in weeding out sabotage or subversion, and earned the hostility of the anarchists and Trotskyites. Later, he was made governor of the province of Albacete and then of the province of Guadalajara. He remained in Spain after the war, and was arrested and executed by firing squad.

== Early years ==
Maure was born in 1903. He earned his living as a driver. In February 1932, Cazorla was elected a member of the Federación de Juventudes Socialistas (FJSE, Federation of Socialist Youth). At the 5th congress of the Socialist Youth on 21 April 1934, Carlos Hernandez was elected president with 16,283 votes and Santiago Carrillo was elected Secretary with 16,000 votes. Cazorla won 15,388 votes and was elected First Member. On 15 January 1936, Cazorla signed a pact on behalf of the FJSE for cooperation with other left of center parties in the elections of 16 February 1936. The pact was also signed by representatives of the Unión Republicana (Republican Union), Izquierda Republicana (Republican Left), Partido Socialista Obrero Español (PSOE, Spanish Socialist Workers' Party), Unión General de Trabajadores (UGT, General Union of Workers), Partido Comunista de España (PCE, Communist Party of Spain), Partido Sindicalista (Syndicalist Party) and Partido Obrero de Unificación Marxista (POUM, Workers' Party of Marxist Unification). The pact rejected nationalization of the land and the bank, and rejected workers' control, so was a victory for the moderate left.

In 1936, Santiago Carrillo, Federico Melchor, José Laín Entralgo and José Cazorla were socialist members of the national liaison committee for unification of the communist and socialist youth. The new organization, the Juventudes Socialistas Unificadas (JSU, Unified Socialist Youth), adhered to the Communist Youth International as a "sympathizer". The JSU committed itself to being a "new style" Popular front youth movement as described by the Communist International. Carrillo was secretary-general of the JSU. On the eve of Francisco Franco's rebellion, in July 1936, Cazorla and Carrillo; José Díaz and Vicente Uribe of the Communist Party; Manuel Lois of the UGT; and representatives of the PSOE met and agreed on joint action to defend the republic.

== Madrid Defense Council ==
At the start of November 1936, the fascist armies approached Madrid. The government of the Second Spanish Republic, under Francisco Largo Caballero, had done nothing to prepare the capital's defenses for fear of alarming the population. José Cazorla was made alternate for Public Order under Santiago Carrillo in the Madrid Defense Council established on 7 November 1936. Both Cazorla and Carrillo joined the Spanish Communist Party (Partido Comunista de España, PCE) in November 1936. On 11 November 1936, over 1,000 Nationalist prisoners were taken from the Model Prison and killed in the Jarama valley by the Republican 5th regiment as potential "Fifth Columnists". The incident is known as the Paracuellos massacres. According to Antony Beevor, the order for the massacre came from either Cazorla, as Carrillo's deputy, or from the Soviet adviser Mikhail Koltsov. Hugh Thomas wrote that Segundo Serrano Poncela, the delegate of public order, was probably responsible, not Carillo, but Koltsov may have been involved.

Cazorla succeeded Carrillo as delegate for public order on 27 December 1936. He tightened control of the police and initiated harsh measures against anyone suspected of sabotage or subversive activities. Suspects were placed in preventative detention, and after police inquiries could be punished by assignment to work brigades or expelled from Madrid. The Confederación Nacional del Trabajo (CNT, National Confederation of Labor) delegates on the council asserted that Cazorla was secretly persecuting CNT members, leading to charges and counter-charges in the press. Cazorla was genuinely concerned with ensuring the security of the Republic, and the CNT Popular Courts were often known to acquit people without investigation who turned out to be working for the rebels, but there were police abuses. Cazorla dealt with any abuses that were drawn to his attention. He seems to have been tough and willing to make unpopular decisions, but diligent and principled.

On 29 January 1937, Isidoro Diéguez Dueñas proposed that the POUM radio station in Madrid and its newspaper El Combatiente Rojo should be seized, since he claimed they had been devoted "solely and exclusively to combating the government and the Popular Front." The measure was approved unanimously. José Cazorla then declared that he would take over all the POUM's buildings and vehicles, since it was now "illegal". This was also passed without opposition. On 21 April 1937, Melchor Rodríguez García, a CNT member and director of prisons in Madrid, published unsubstantiated accusations that Cazorla was maintaining secret prisons to hold anarchists, socialists, and other republicans, and either executing, or torturing them as "traitors". He said Cazorla had, "revived the old methods of the savages Martínez Anido and Arlegui ... he is, by his pernicious endeavors bringing dishonor upon the government of the Republic..." Rodríguez gave details of torture in these prisons, and blamed Cazorla. Cazorla reacted by closing the offices of the anarchist journal Solidaridad Obrera. This caused a scandal and Cazorla resigned from the council. The prime minister, Francisco Largo Caballero, used the incident as a pretext to dissolve the Madrid Defense Council on 23 April 1937.

== Later career ==
Cazorla was civil governor of the Province of Albacete from 18 July 1937 to 25 May 1938. He succeeded Justo Martínez Amutio in this position. A few days before leaving Madrid for Albacete, he married his partner, Aurora Arnáiz Amigo (15 May 1913 – 21 January 2009), another member of the JSU executive committee. Cazorla already had a son from a previous relationship. In May 1938, Cazorla was replaced in Albacete by Ernesto Vega de la Iglesia. Cazorla was appointed governor of the Province of Guadalajara in place of Vega de la Iglesia. His son Carlos was born on 18 August 1938.

During the Casado coup in March 1939, Cazorla and his family were arrested and placed in Guadalajara prison. The arrest was by troops led by the anarchist Cipriano Mera Sanz during the anti-communist offensive launched by Segismundo Casado. Their infant son, who was ill, received no medical care and died in prison. Cazorla and his wife were released on 28 March 1939, the day before the troops of the rebel army of Francisco Franco entered the city. The couple made their way to Alicante, hoping to leave Spain by boat. Finding chaos in the port, the two decided to separate. Aurora joined a group trying to reach the French border, (Note: Aurora Arnaiz Amigo escaped from Spain and managed to make her way via France and Cuba to Mexico. She remarried in Mexico after Cazorla's death, obtained a law degree, and became a prominent academic specializing in constitutional law and the author of many books.) while Cazorla returned to Madrid hoping to rebuild the PCE organization, or at least join the guerrillas thought to be operating in the surrounding sierra. In Madrid, Cazorla went into hiding and took a mundane job. He was arrested in August 1939 with other communists. Four of them, including Cazorla, were sentenced to death and executed on 8 April 1940.

== Sources ==
- Alexander, Robert J. (1999). The Anarchists in the Spanish Civil War. Janus Publishing Company Lim. ISBN 978-1-85756-412-9.
- Arnáiz, Aurora (1996). Retrato hablado de Luisa Julián. Madrid: Compañía Literaria. ISBN 84-8213-042-0.
- Beevor, Antony (1999). The Spanish Civil War. Cassell. ISBN 978-0-304-35281-4.
- Beevor, Antony (2006). The Battle for Spain: The Spanish Civil War 1936-1939. Penguin Books. ISBN 0-14-303765-X.
- Bolloten, Burnett (1991). The Spanish Civil War: Revolution and Counterrevolution. Univ of North Carolina Press. ISBN 978-0-8078-1906-7.
- Estornés Zubizarreta, Idoia (2015). "Aurora Arnáiz Amigo". Auñamendi Eusko Entziklopedia (in Spanish).
- Fundación Pablo Iglesias (2015). "Melchor Fernández, Federico" (in Spanish).
- "Gobernadores Civiles". Archivo Provincial Albacete.
- "Gobernadores civiles de Guadalajara". La Alcarria Obrera. 31 May 2013.
- Graham, Helen (28 June 1991). Socialism and War: The Spanish Socialist Party in Power and Crisis, 1936-1939. Cambridge University Press. ISBN 978-0-521-39257-0.
- Graham, Helen (19 December 2002). The Spanish Republic at War, 1936–1939. Cambridge University Press. p. 194. ISBN 978-0-521-45932-7.
- Heywood, Paul (13 February 2003). Marxism and the Failure of Organised Socialism in Spain, 1879-1936. Cambridge University Press. ISBN 978-0-521-53056-9.
- Ibárruri, Dolores (1966). Autobiography of La Pasionaria. International Publishers Co. ISBN 978-0-7178-0468-9.
- Jackson, Gabriel (5 May 2012). Spanish Republic and the Civil War, 1931-1939. Princeton University Press. ISBN 978-1-4008-2018-4.
- Jackson, Michael W. (1994). Fallen Sparrows: The International Brigades in the Spanish Civil War. American Philosophical Society. p. 16. ISBN 978-0-87169-212-2.
- "José Cazorla Maure". Sociedad Benéfica de Historiadores Aficionados y Creadores.
- "Los ebanistas y la crisis de tabajo: Nueva Comisión Ejecutiva de la Federación de Juventudes Socialistas". Luz: 2. 17 February 1932.
- "El V Congreso de las Juventudes Socialistas. La nueva Comisión Ejecutiva". Luz: 9. 21 April 1934.
- Peirats, José; Ealham, Chris (2005). The CNT in the Spanish Revolution. ChristieBooks.com. ISBN 978-1-873976-24-1.
- R.D. (31 May 2007). "CAZORLA MAURE, José". Los de la sierra.
- Romero Salvadó, Francisco J. (2013). Historical Dictionary of the Spanish Civil War. Rowman & Littlefield. ISBN 978-0-8108-5784-1.
- Serrallonga i Urquidi, Joan (2007). "El aparato provincial durante la Segunda República. Los Gobernadores Civiles, 1931-1939" (PDF). Hispania Nova. Revista de Historia Contemporánea (in Spanish) (7).
- Thomas, Hugh (2001). The Spanish Civil War. Modern Library. p. 463. ISBN 978-0-375-75515-6.
