= Alejandro de la Sota (architect) =

Spanish architect (1913–1996)

- Born: Alejandro de la Sota Martínez; 20 October 1913; Pontevedra, Spain
- Died: 14 February 1996 (aged 82); Madrid, Spain
- Education: Superior Technical School of Architecture of the Technical University of Madrid
- Occupation: Architect
- Buildings: Pontevedra Municipal Sports Hall; Maravillas School Gynamsium

Alejandro de la Sota Martínez (Galicia, 1913 - 1996) was a Spanish architect.

== Biography ==
He was born in Pontevedra in Galicia. At the University of Santiago de Compostela, his studies were in mathematics. He graduated from the Technical University of Madrid in 1941.

From 1956 to 1972, he was a professor at the Technical University of Madrid.

After graduation, de la Sota continued to live in Madrid, although he maintained links with his native Galicia. He was a promoter of the industrialisation of construction in the 1960s. His Maravillas School gymnasium of 1961 was the first steel-framed building in Madrid. Dora's buildings combine geometric rigor with constructive sincerity and a structural boldness of form that still surprises today.

== Awards and honours ==
De la Sota received the National Prize of Architecture and the Gold Medal of the Council of Architects.

== Works ==
- Cruz Gallástegui Building, Galicia Biological Mission (1949) (Pontevedra)
- Gobierno Civil (Tarragona) (1956-1963)
- Talleres Aeronáuticos TABSA (Madrid) (1957-1958)
- Maravillas School Gynamsium (Madrid) (1961)
- Block of houses (Salamanca) (1963)
- César Carlos Residential College (Madrid) (1967)
- Children's Summer Residence (Miraflores de la Sierra) (1957-1959)
- CLESA dairy processing plant (Madrid) (1963)
- Houses in calle del Prior (Salamanca) (1962-1963)
- CENIM Industrial Building (Madrid) (1965-1967)
- Pontevedra Municipal Sports Hall (1966)
- Caja de Ahorros Provincial Residential School (Ourense) (1966-1967)
- Classrooms and Seminaries of the University (Sevilla) (1972)
- Computer center of the Post Office (Madrid) (1973-1976)
- Banco Pastor (Pontevedra) (1974)
- Post Office and Telecommunications Building (León) (1980-1983)
- Caja Postal de Ahorros Building (Madrid) (1986-1989)
- University Library (Santiago de Compostela) (1990)
- Court buildings (Zaragoza) (1991-1993)
- Redesign and Restoration of Cabildo Insular Building (Las Palmas) (1994)

== Gallery ==
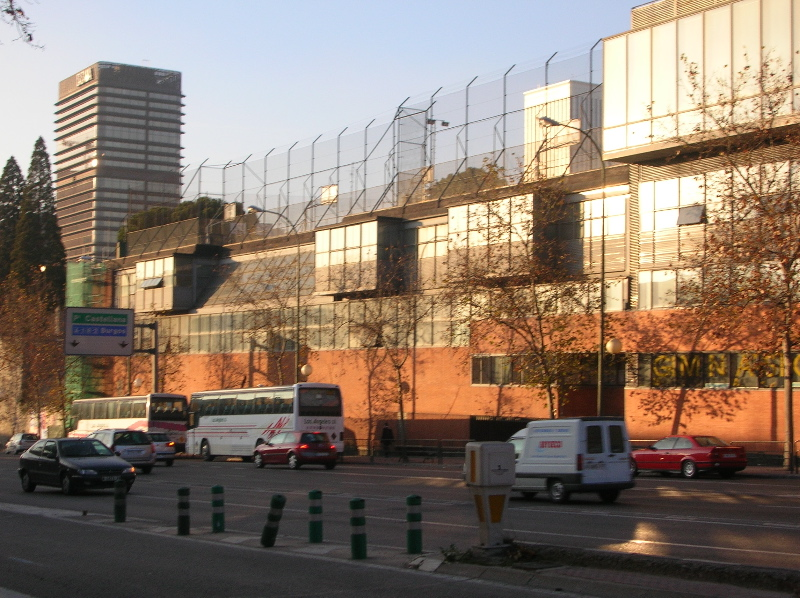
The exterior of the Maravillas School Gymnasium (Madrid)

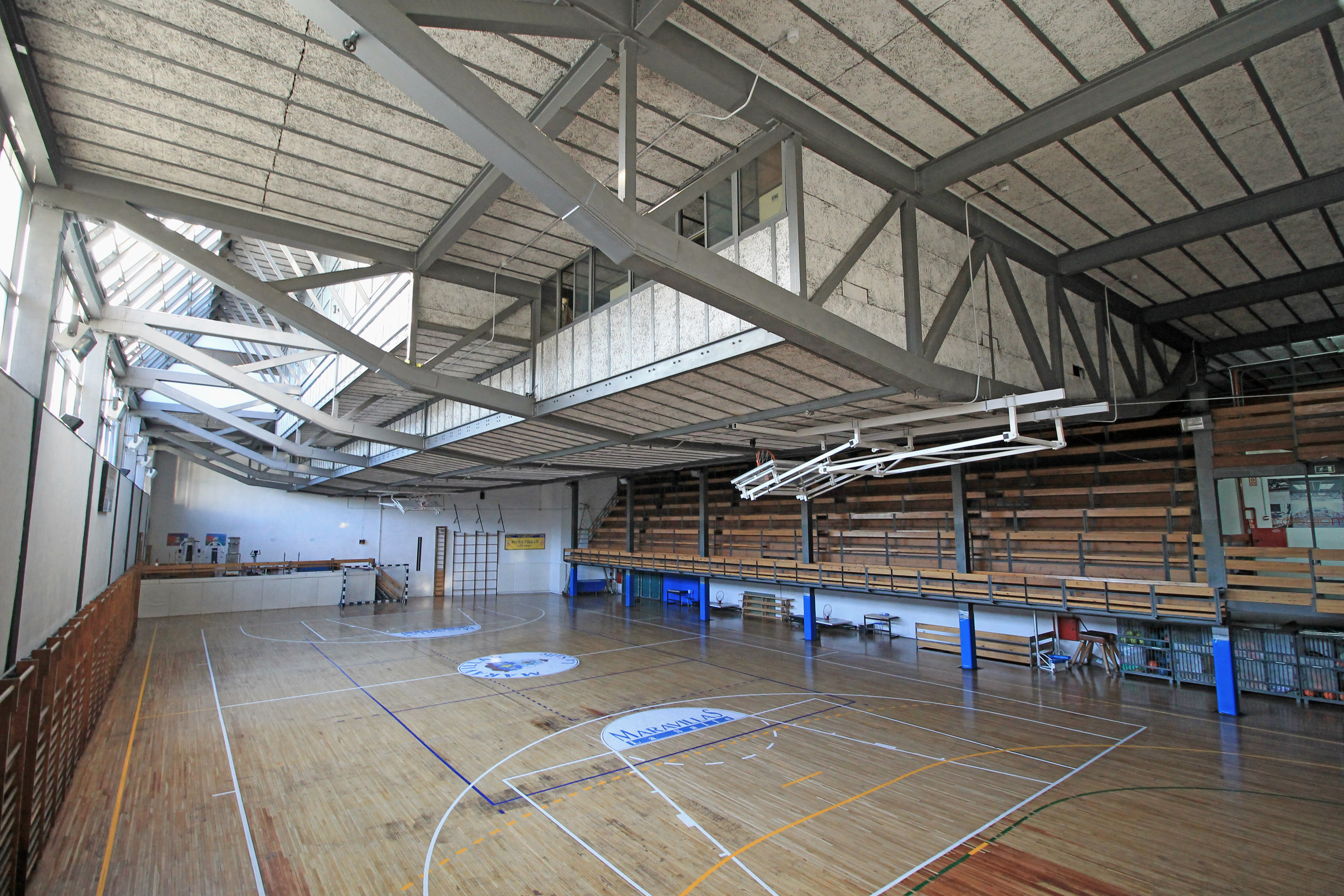
The interior of the Maravillas School Gymnasium

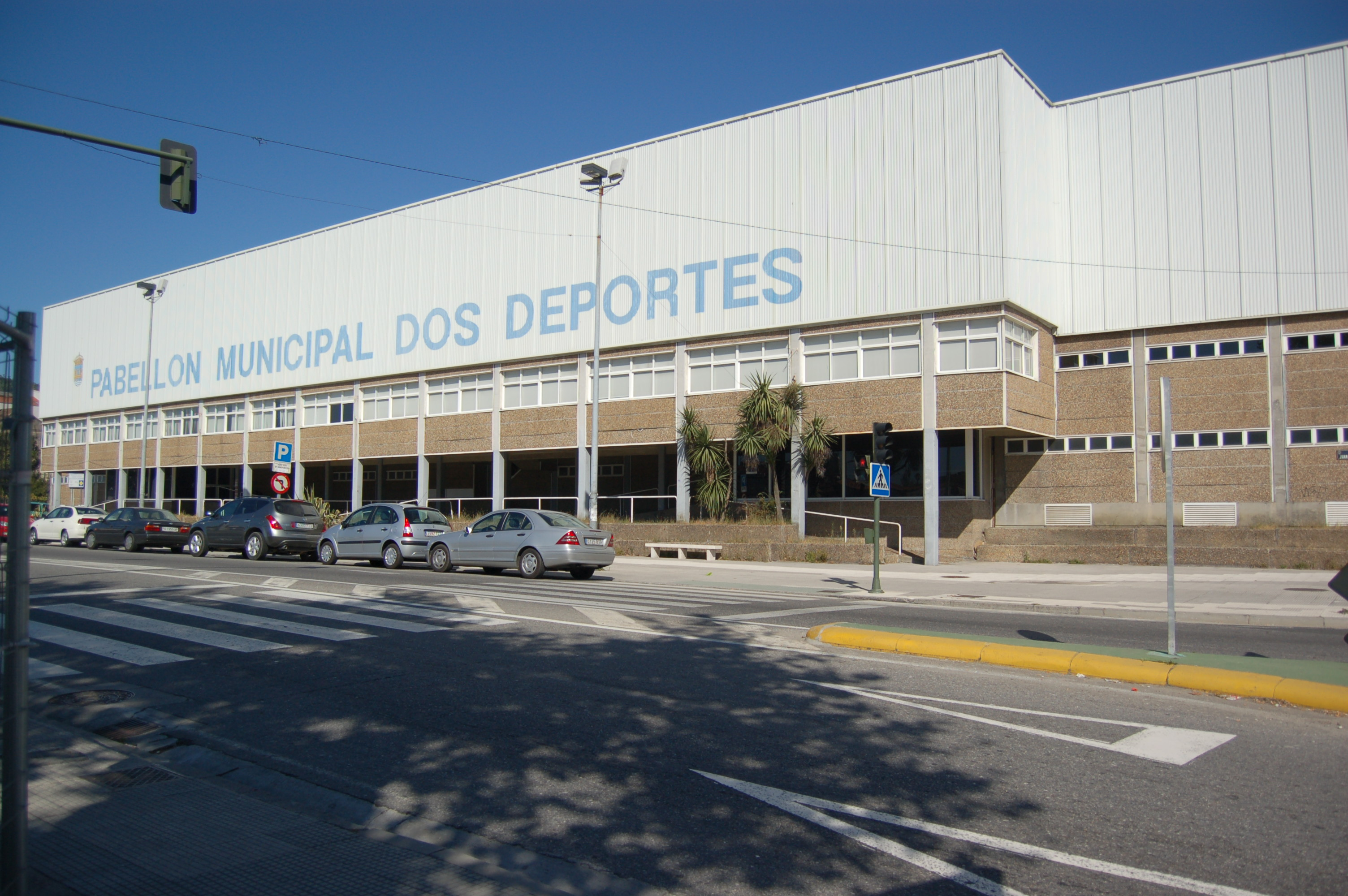
Pavillón Municipal dos Deportes (Pontevedra)

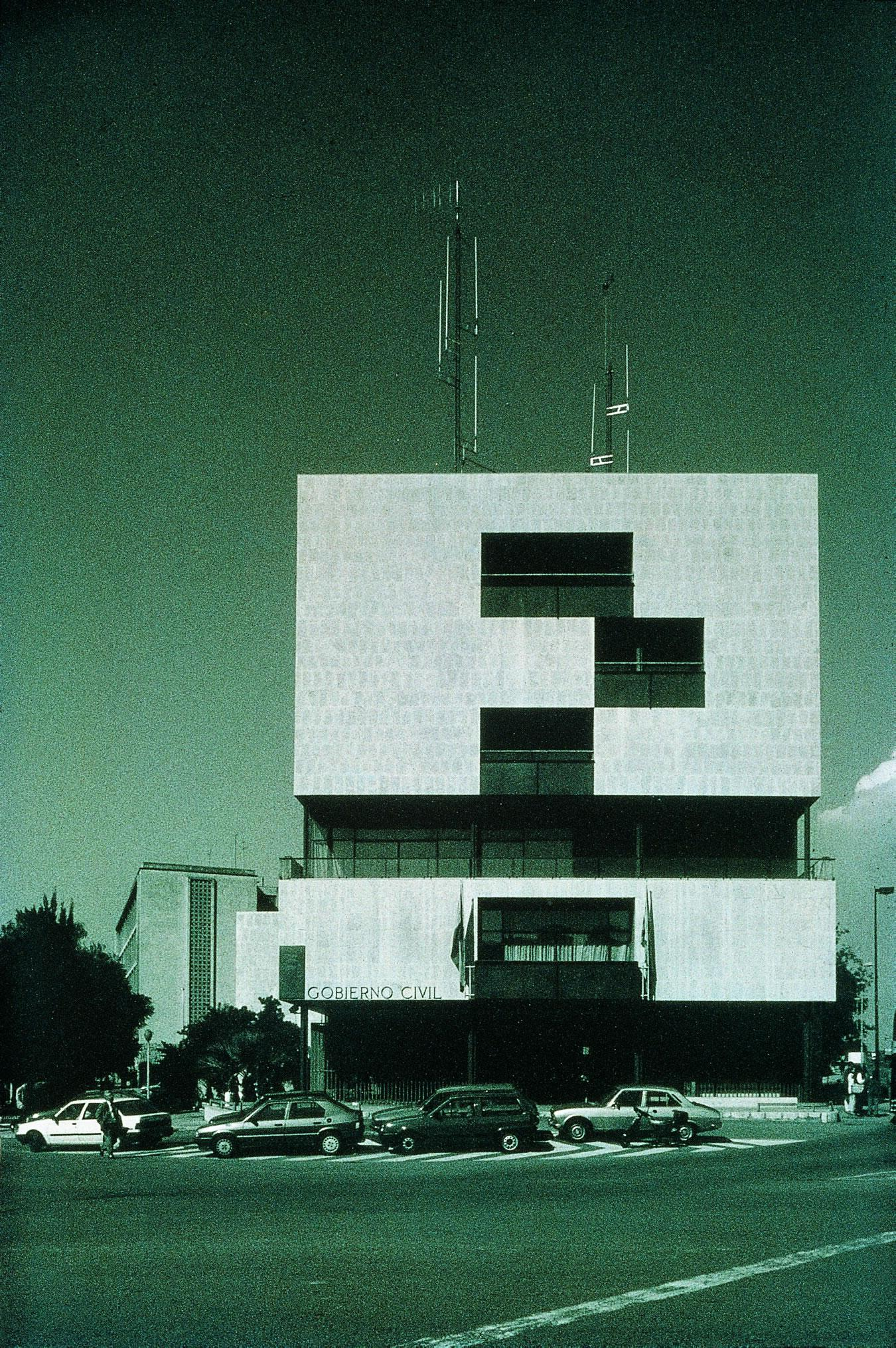
Gobierno Civil (Tarragona)
