= Galicia Biological Mission =

Agricultural research institute in Galicia, Spain

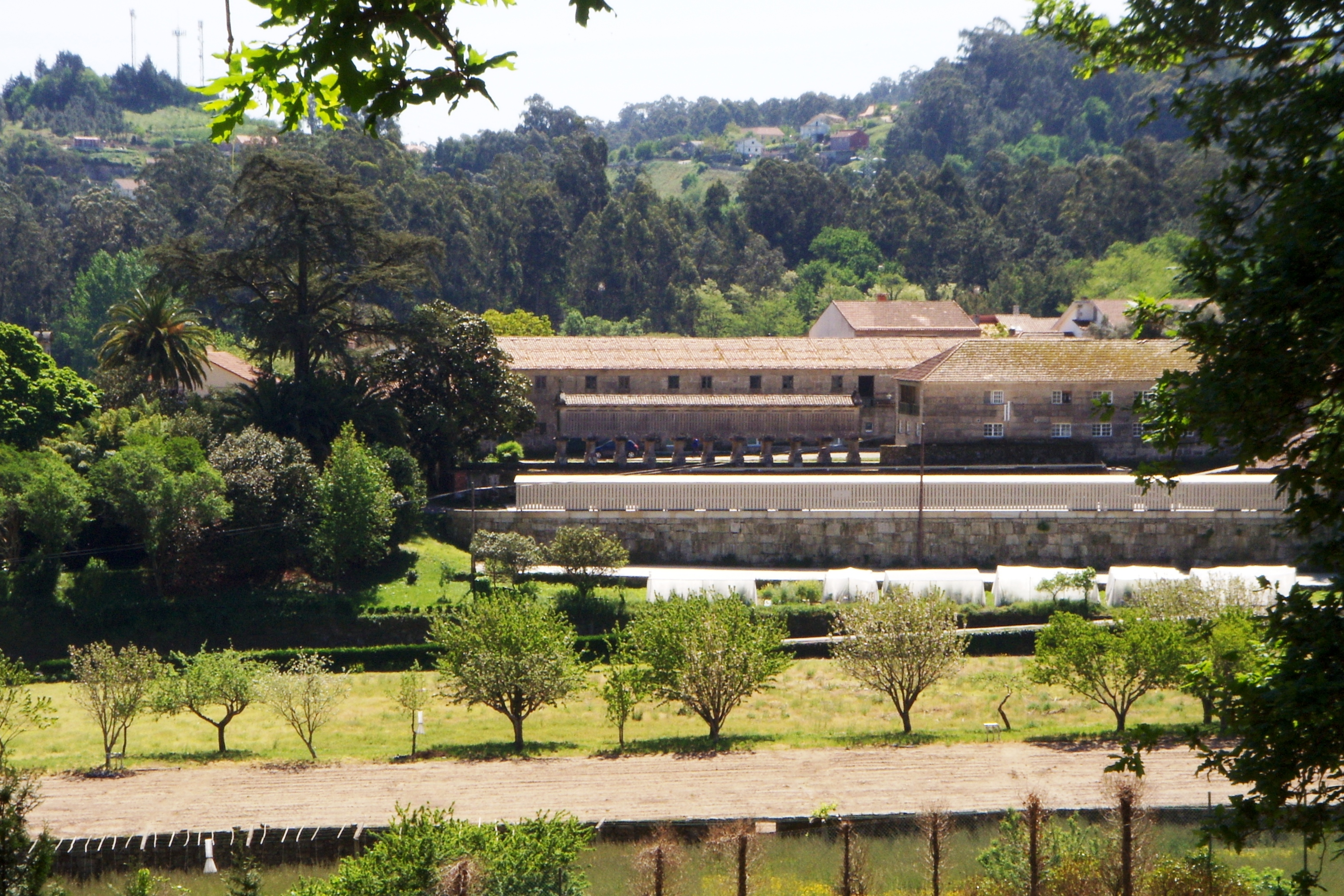
- Headquarters

Agency overview
- Formed: 1 April 1921
- Jurisdiction: Spain
- Headquarters: A Carballeira 8 - Salcedo 36143 Pontevedra
- Employees: 80
- Website: https://www.mbg.csic.es/es/la-mision-biologica-de-galicia/

The Biological Mission of Galicia is a centre of the Higher Council for Scientific Research located in the civil parish of Salcedo in the municipality of Pontevedra in Spain. It is the oldest research institute of the Higher Council for Scientific Research in Galicia and the oldest agricultural research institute in Spain.

== History ==
The Biological Mission of Galicia was created by the Council for the Extension of Scientific Studies and Research in April 1921. Its first headquarters was the Veterinary School of Santiago de Compostela, directed by Cruz Gallástegui. The mission remained in Santiago de Compostela until 1926, when the veterinary school disappeared. In 1927, the Provincial Council of Pontevedra offered a new location to the Biological Mission, which moved in 1928 first to the La Tablada estate in Campolongo and later to the palace that belonged to Archbishop Malvar in Salcedo, the Pazo de Gandarón, where it has remained to this day.

From 1930 onwards, the institution's activities focused on the genetic improvement of maize, the variety of chestnut trees resistant to dyeing and the promotion in Spain of the English Large White pig breed.

Between 1940 and 1950, the Mission consolidated its first lines of research on the genetics and physiology of plants and animals.

Between 1960 and 1973, the research lines were interrupted until 1973, when Armando Ordás took over the maize breeding line and created a seed syndicate.

From 1980 onwards, new research was initiated, based on the cultivation of legumes, Brassicaceae and vines.

Currently, the centre is working on crop improvement to adapt to the consequences of climate change and is engaged in agricultural and forestry research.

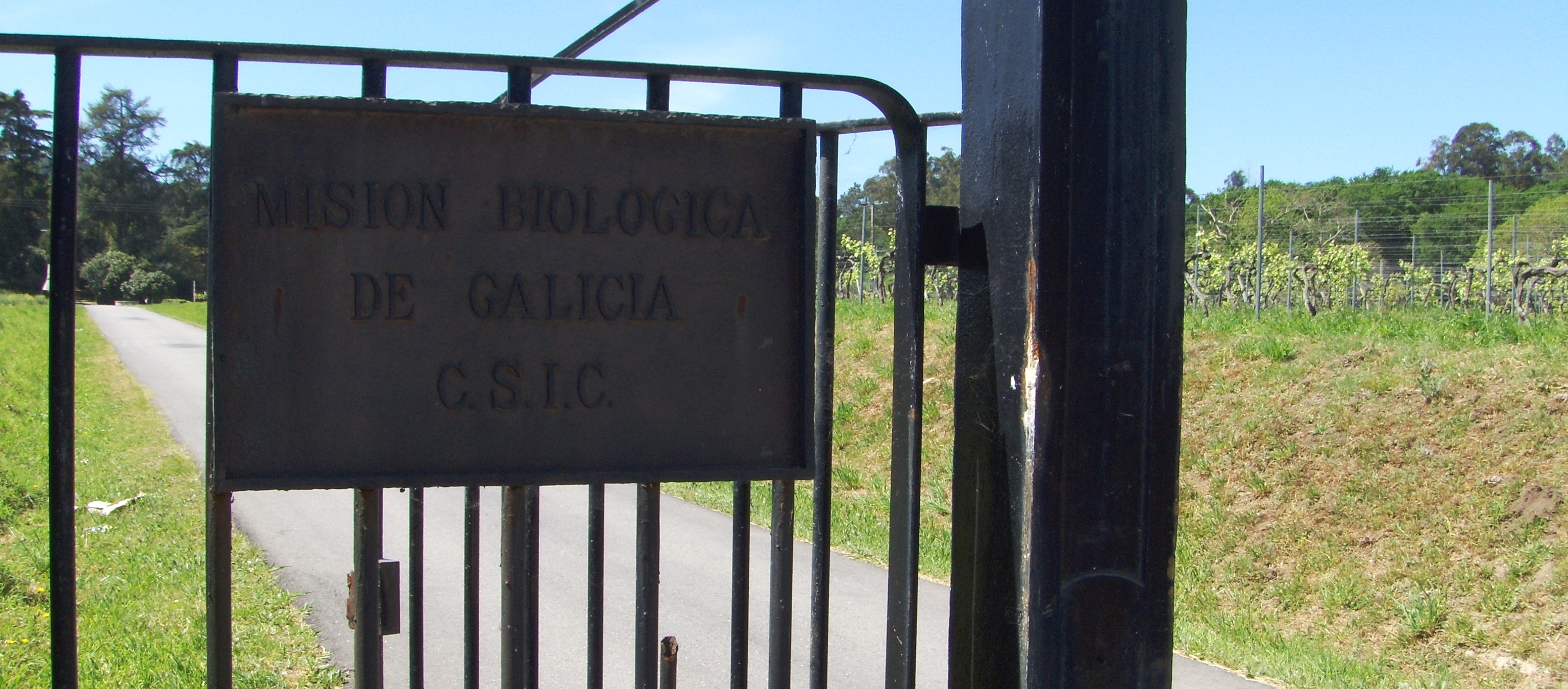
Biological Mission of Galicia (CSIC). Sign at the entrance to the estate.

== Description ==
Its facilities consist of three main buildings and several secondary buildings, located on a twelve-hectare site belonging to the Provincial Council of Pontevedra.

In April 2021 it has 12 scientists and 2 postdoctoral researchers on staff. Eight research groups and almost eighty people work in the Biological Mission of Galicia.

The funding of the Biological Mission comes mainly from the general budgets of the State and the Provincial Council of Pontevedra.

=== Facilities ===
The original building of the estate was the pazo de Gandarón, which had a Galician granary, a dovecote, two viewpoints and several barns and small stables. In order to adapt it to its new use, the building was renovated. Warehouses were built for pig breeding, which were later converted into laboratories and offices.

- The estate. It consists of twelve hectares, ten of which are arable. It is divided into lots whose division and naming are in accordance with their original use. In one of them, a native forest is preserved and others are devoted to gardens, in which the camellia collection stands out. There are several buildings on the estate, including a pergola, a pond and various sets of stone tables and benches. There is also a Galician granary and a cider cellar.
- Pazo de la Carballeira de Gandarón. It was built by Archbishop Sebastián Malvar at the end of the 18th century as a family residence.
- Miguel Odriozola Building. It was built in the 1940s for pig breeding, as part of the animal genetics research initiated by Miguel Odriozola in the previous decade. When this research was completed in 1987, it was decided to renovate the building. This renovation was carried out between 2002 and 2003 by the architect Mauro Lomba.
- Cruz Gallástegui Building. It was built in the 1960s by the architect Alejandro de la Sota, being the first work by this architect. Its construction was intended to house the offices that were previously located in the palace. The building was occupied in 1969-1970.

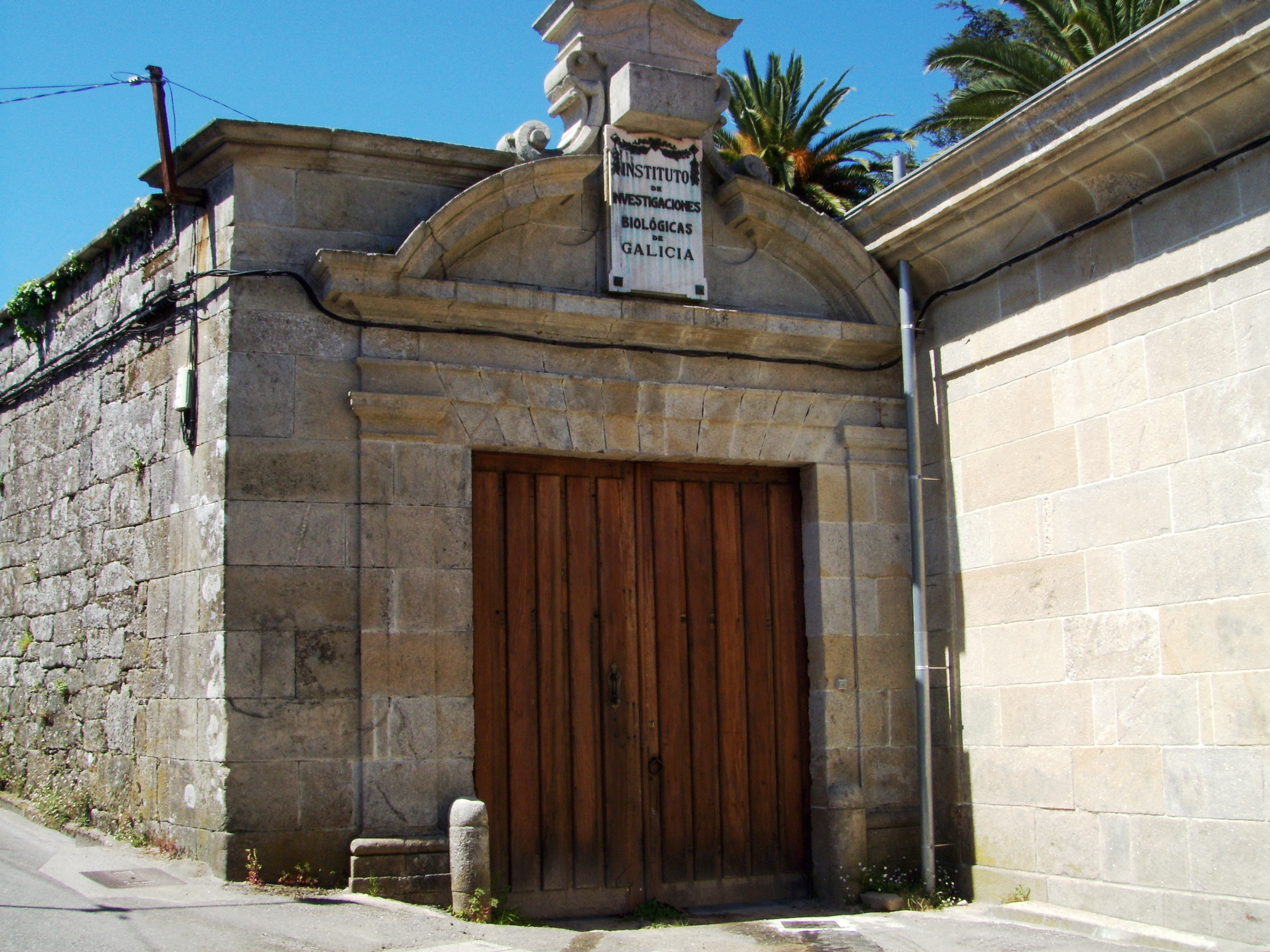
One of the doors of the pazo.

In February 2022, the CSIC integrated the Agrobiological Research Institute of Galicia (based in Santiago de Compostela) into the Biological Mission of Galicia.

=== Objectives ===
The overall objective of the biological mission is to develop germplasm for agriculture that has lower fertiliser and irrigation requirements, tolerates biotic and abiotic stress and is of higher quality. At the same time, an attempt has been made to gain a deeper understanding of the genetic processes involved in adaptation and evolution, stress resistance and quality of crop species.

== See also ==
- Spanish National Research Council

=== External links ===
- Galicia Biological Mission (in Spanish and English).
