= Guarrate =

Coordinates: 41°17′N 5°26′W

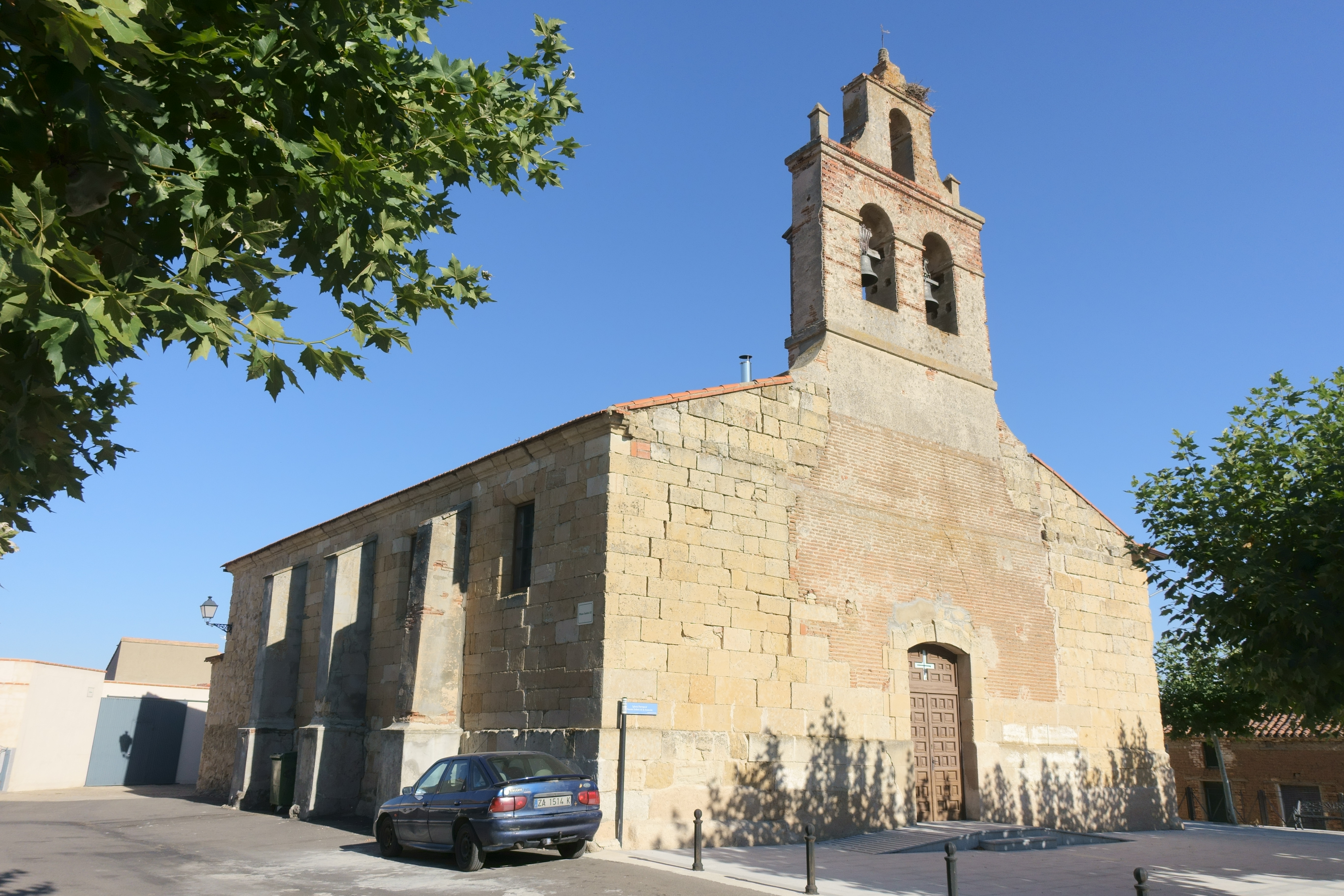
- Interactive map of Guarrate
- Country: Spain
- Autonomous community: Castile and León
- Province: Zamora
- Municipality: Guarrate

Area
  - Total: 32 km^{2} (12 sq mi)

Population (2025-01-01)
  - Total: 313
  - Density: 9.8/km^{2} (25/sq mi)
- Time zone: UTC+1 (CET)
  - Summer (DST): UTC+2 (CEST)
- Website: Oficial

Guarrate is a municipality located in the province of Zamora, Castile and León, Spain. According to the 2004 census (INE), the municipality has a population of 369 inhabitants.
