= Carlos Esplá =

Spanish politician and journalist

Carlos Esplá Rizo
- Born: 23 June 1895; Alicante, Spain
- Died: 6 July 1971 (aged 76); Mexico
- Occupations: Journalist and politician

Carlos Esplá Rizo (23 June 1895 – 6 July 1971) was a Spanish Left Republican politician and journalist. For several months during the Spanish Civil War (1936–1939) he was the first Spanish Minister of Propaganda.

== Early years: 1895–1931 ==
Carlos Esplá Rizo was born in Alicante on 23 June 1895. His family was middle class and liberal. He soon became interested in politics, and helped found the Republican Left journal El Luchador (The Wrestler) in Alicante. Due to his anti-monarchy articles he had to leave the city and move to Valencia. There he became involved with well-known Republicans and continued to work as a journalist.

In 1921 Esplá went to Paris for a planned stay of three months that became seven years. While in Paris he founded España con Honra (Spain with Honor). He was connected to Miguel de Unamuno and collaborated with Vicente Blasco Ibáñez in anti-monarchist activities. Esplá became Paris correspondent of the Spanish Fabra news agency, He helped arrange the publication of Spanish and French versions of the polemic Una Nación Secuestrada by Blasco Ibáñez in November 1924. It was at once translated into English as Alfonso XIII Unmasked. The book attacked both Miguel Primo de Rivera and the king as enemies of democracy.

Esplá also wrote for major newspapers such as El Liberal, La Voz, El Heraldo de Madrid, El Sol, La Vanguardia and Las Provincias. In 1929 Esplá and José Sánchez-Guerra y Martínez led the revolutionary movement against Primo de Rivera in Valencia. He became foreign correspondent for El Sol, which let him travel in Europe. In 1930 in Geneva he was named vice-president of the International Association of Journalists, which had members from major newspapers around the world. He left El Sol early in 1931 in support of Nicolás María de Urgoiti.

== Pre-war political activities: 1931–1936 ==
In March 1931 Esplá decided to return to Spain to participate in the municipal elections of the newly declared Second Spanish Republic. On 14 April 1931 he raised the tricolor over the Alicante town hall and was appointed civil governor of the city, but resigned on 28 April 1931 and left for Madrid to offer his services to the provisional government. Esplá, who admired Manuel Azaña, thought an individual should serve the community according to best of his abilities, which in his case meant journalism. He accepted the post of head of press relations of the Spanish Embassy in Paris. Before leaving he served for a few weeks as head of the Press Office of the Ministry of State to pass on his knowledge to the new Minister, Alejandro Lerroux. After completing his work at the Ministry of State he accepted the position of Civil Governor of Barcelona. In this role he worked conscientiously to consolidate the Republican reforms and to control anarcho-syndicalism, which he saw as a serious threat to a civil democracy.

Esplá was elected Deputy for Alicante in the election of 28 June 1931. When Azaña became Prime Minister in October 1931 Esplá was named Under-Secretary of the Interior, where he stayed until just before the 1933 elections. He established good relations with the leading nationalists in Barcelona and helped draft the Statute of Autonomy of Catalonia of 1932 (Estatut de Núria). After the right wing victory in the 1933 elections he temporarily left politics and founded a Republican journal Política. Esplá later said the failure of the Left in the 1933 elections was due to its "abysmal" approach to press communications. He was reelected Deputy for Alicante in the elections of 16 February 1936. Azaña offered him the position of Under Secretary of the Presidency, which he accepted after Azaña became President in May 1936. He held this post when the military uprising in July 1936 began the Spanish Civil War.

== Civil War: 1936–1939 ==
As soon as they heard of the military revolt at the outbreak of the Spanish Civil War, the leaders of the Confederación Nacional del Trabajo (CNT) and Unión General de Trabajadores (UGT) called a general strike in Valencia on 19 July 1936 and formed a strike committee. The Popular Front created a separate Peoples' Executive Committee. In response, Manuel Azaña created the Republican Government Delegate Council of Levante by decree, to take control over these groups. The council was to have authority over the provinces of Valencia, Alicante, Castellón, Albacete, Murcia and Cuenca. It was headed by Diego Martínez Barrio, speaker of the Spanish Cortes, and included Mariano Ruiz-Funes and Martinez Echevarría in addition to Esplá. Eventually on 6 August 1936 the Delegate Council returned to Madrid and left the People's Executive Committee in control.

On 21 August 1936, almost certainly at Esplá's urging, Prime Minister José Giral established a propaganda and information office within the Subsecretaría de Presidencia. It was to direct "all services for the press, radio, cinema etc. of an official or semi-official nature that currently operate within the different ministries and which have any connection with information and propaganda, both within Spain and abroad." Esplá was appointed Secretary General of the Council of Ministers in September 1936.

With the approach of General Francisco Franco's troops to Madrid in early November 1936 the government of Prime Minister Francisco Largo Caballero was restructured to include the anarchists Joan Peiró (Industry), Juan López Sánchez (Commerce) and Federica Montseny (Health). Esplá became the first Minister of Propaganda of Spain, with the architect Manuel Sánchez Arcas as his subsecretary. Esplá was Minister of Propaganda from 4 November 1936 to 15 May 1937. When Juan Negrín formed his first government he eliminated the Ministry of Propaganda, making it an undersecretariat under the Ministry of State. Esplá remained in charge of propaganda. A key part of his job was to communicate the Republican position effectively in the foreign press and the League of Nations. Esplá was Under-Secretary for Propaganda until April 1938. The communist Federico Melchor was appointed undersecretary for propaganda. He was replaced by Sánchez Arcas on 22 January 1938 by José Giral, Minister of Foreign Affairs.

== Later years: 1939–1971 ==
After the defeat of the Republic in April 1939, Esplá was convicted by the Tribunal for the Repression of Freemasonry and Communism and sentenced to thirty years imprisonment. He took refuge in Paris, where he did what he could to help Spanish refugees, first working with the Service for Evacuation of Spanish Refugees (Servicio de Evacuación de Refugiados Españoles, SERE) and then with the Council of Aid to Spanish Republicans (Junta de Auxilio a los Republicanos Españoles, JARE) until the end of July 1940. He also worked as correspondent for an Argentine publication. In July 1940 he decided to leave for Buenos Aires, and in August 1940 finally left for Mexico.

In Mexico Esplá was secretary of JARE and manager of the funds of the Republic in exile. He continued to support Spanish exiles with CAFARE after JARE was dissolved in December 1942. During World War II (1939–45) he worked at first to reunify the exiled Republican groups, but eventually fell out with the government in exile after disputes with José Giral. He became a translator for the United Nations and President of the Spanish Republican Center of Mexico. He moved to Washington in July 1951, and spent long periods in New York until 1956, when he returned to Mexico. During his last years he suffered from depression and ceased all work. Carlos Esplá died in 1971.

== Publications ==
- Rizo, Carlos Esplá (1916). De la lucha (The Fight).
- Rizo, Carlos Esplá (2002). Unamuno, Blasco Ibáñez y Sánchez Guerra en París: crónicas de París y otros escritos periodísticos, 1916–1930. Instituto de Cultura Juan Gil-Albert. p. 421. ISBN 978-84-7784-877-6. First published in 1940
- Rizo, Carlos Esplá (1942). ¿Cuándo volvemos a España? (When Will We Return to Spain?).
- Rizo, Carlos Esplá (1952). Don Amadeu Hurtado: un liberal europeu. Ed. Imprenta Libreria. p. 29.
- Rizo, Carlos Esplá (1953). Zarabanda franquista.
- Rizo, Carlos Esplá (2004-01-01). Mi vida hecha cenizas: diarios 1920–1965. Editorial Renacimiento. p. 377. ISBN 978-84-8472-181-9.

== Sources ==
- Bolloten, Burnett (1991). The Spanish Civil War: Revolution and Counterrevolution. Univ of North Carolina Press. ISBN 978-0-8078-1906-7.
- Egido León, Ángeles (2001). "Comentario de Libros: Sueño y pesadilla del republicanismo español. Carlos Esplá: una biografía política.- Angosto Vélez" (in Spanish). Archived from the original on October 23, 2004.
- "Esplá Rizo, Carlos (1895–1971)". Censo-Guía de Archivos (in Spanish). Ministerio de Educación, Cultura y Deporte.
- "Espla Rizo, Carlos" (in Spanish). Congreso de los Diputados.
- García, Hugo (2010). The Truth about Spain!: Mobilizing British Public Opinion, 1936–1939. Sussex Academic Press. ISBN 978-1-84519-332-4.
- Paz, Abel (2011). The Story of the Iron Column: Militant Anarchism in the Spanish Civil War. AK Press. ISBN 978-1-84935-064-8.
- Thomas, Hugh (2013-11-06). The Spanish Civil War: Revised Edition. Random House Publishing Group. ISBN 978-0-8041-5216-7.
