= Paracuellos massacres =

Massacre in Madrid

- Part of the Spanish Civil War
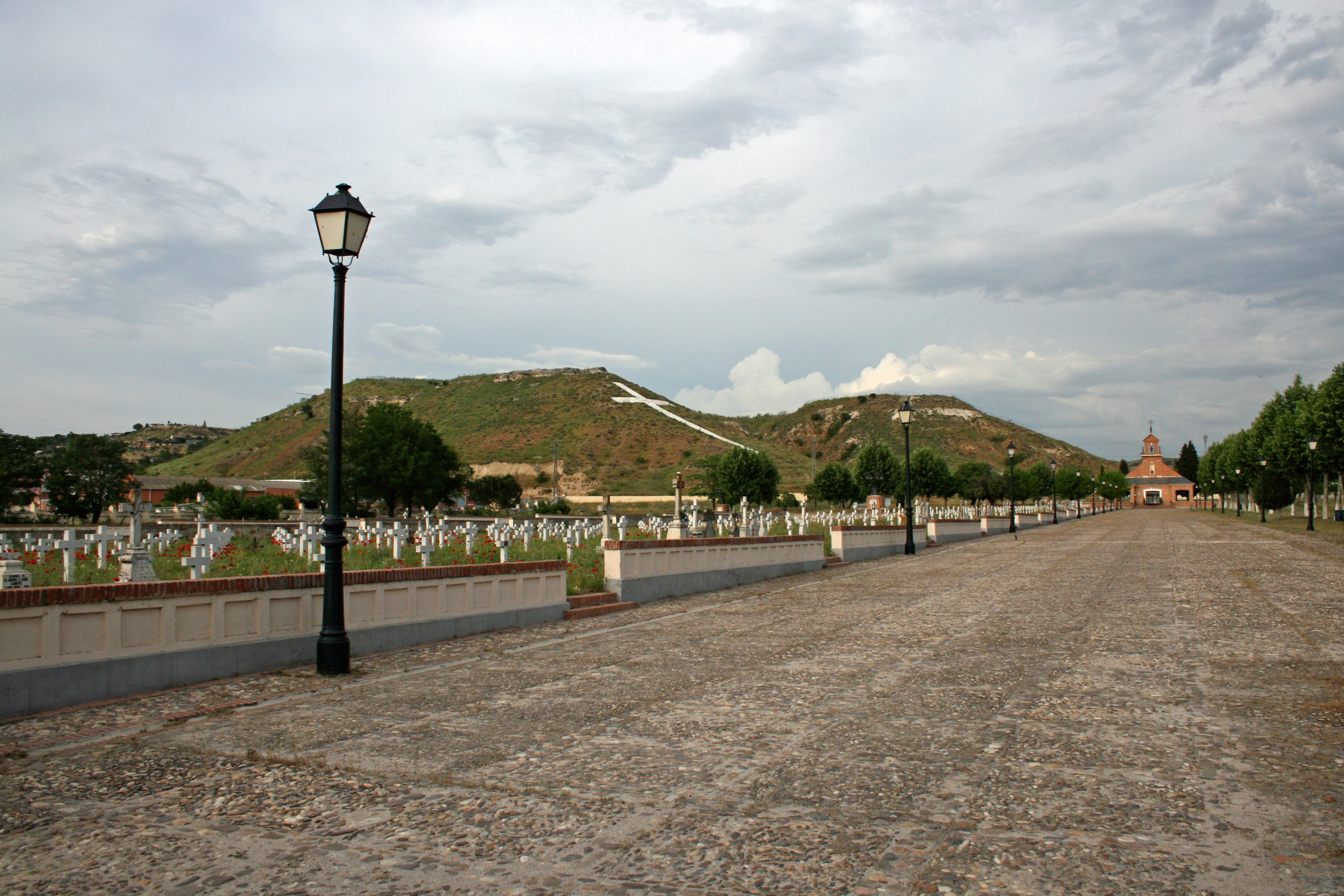
- Paracuellos cemetery memorial
- Location: Paracuellos del Jarama and Torrejón de Ardoz, Spain
- Date: November–December 1936
- Target: Civilians, Catholic priests, and prisoners of war
- Attack type: Mass execution
- Deaths: ~2,000–3,000
- Perpetrators: Republican troops and militiamen

The Paracuellos massacres (Spanish: Matanzas de Paracuellos) were a series of mass killings of prisoners of war deemed to have been part of or supporting the Nationalists by the Republican faction of the Spanish Civil War that took place before and during the Siege of Madrid during the early stages of the war. The death toll remains a subject of debate and controversy.

== Background ==
About 5,000 political prisoners and rebel military personnel had been incarcerated in Madrid since before the start of the war, in July 1936. Many of them had been captured during the failed uprising of the Montaña barracks, in western Madrid. The prisoners came under the control of the new Junta de Defensa de Madrid (Committee for the Defence of Madrid), an emergency committee left in charge of the city on November 7, after the Republican government led by Francisco Largo Caballero, evacuated Madrid for its temporary capital, Valencia.

Many of the prisoners were taken out of prison in so-called sacas (extractions), 33 in total, between November 7 and December 4, as the rebel Nationalist forces launched their assault on Madrid. The Republicans feared the presence of so many potentially hostile prisoners in the rear guard during the battle. The extractions were ordered in writing by the Republican authorities in Madrid, often in documents signed by Segundo Serrano Poncela, Deputy for Public Order, working directly under the supervision of the young communist politician Santiago Carrillo. However, the responsibility of Carrillo in the massacre is much debated.

According to historian Javier Cervera, the sacas that were carried out to move prisoners to other locations did not result in executions, and the prisoners were relocated farther from the front, to Alcalá de Henares. At Paracuellos, however, a massacre resulted. According to the British historian Antony Beevor, the order to kill the prisoners most likely came from the Spanish communist José Cazorla Maure or, more indirectly, from the Soviet advisor Mikhail Koltsov.

== Mass shootings ==
Most prisoners, who were told they would be set free, were taken by trucks to fields outside Paracuellos del Jarama and Torrejón de Ardoz, where they were shot and buried in mass graves. The first shootings took place before dawn on 7 November and continued rapidly until 10 November, when they were temporarily halted after the anarchist Melchor Rodríguez García, who opposed the executions, became the head of the Madrid prison system.

The executions resumed on 14 November, when Rodríguez resigned, and did not stop until he resumed the post in early December.

From the early days, news spread of the executions, which were denounced by foreign diplomats based in Madrid, including the consul of Norway, Felix Schlayer, who talked about the issue with Carrillo.

== Attempted murder of Henny ==
On 8 December a plane carrying Dr. Georges Henny, an envoy sent by the International Red Cross, on his way back to France was shot down over Pastrana, northeast of Madrid. According to César Vidal, Henny had a report of the massacre and planned to present it during a meeting of the League of Nations in Geneva. This has not been corroborated by any other historians, with Ian Gibson stating no such report or evidence of it exists in Red Cross archives. The Republican authorities blamed the Nationalist air force for the attack, but on 21 December it was revealed that the plane had been shot down by Soviet-built airplanes with Soviet pilots.

Henny spent four months in hospital and was unable to deliver his report. Louis Delaprée, a French journalist who traveled in the same plane, who died weeks later because of his injuries, blamed General Aleksandr Mikhailovich Orlov, the Soviet NKVD's rezident in Spain, for the downing of the plane.

== Victims ==
Most of those killed in the Paracuellos massacre were civilians, soldiers and Catholic priests. Amongst the victims, there was also a large number of falangists.

Among those executed were Federico Salmón, a former conservative labour minister in 1935; the noted politician Jesús Cánovas del Castillo; a football player with Atletico de Madrid and Real Madrid, Monchín Triana; Pedro Muñoz Seca, a famous writer and monarchist; agronomist Marcelino Arana; Mateo García de los Reyes, a retired admiral; and the lawyer Ricardo de la Cierva y Codorníu, the father of the historian Ricardo de la Cierva y Hoces. Another high-profile victim of the massacre was the 18th Duke of Peñaranda, a wealthy Spanish nobleman.

The number of those killed at Paracuellos is still controversial. In 1977, a figure of 12,000 deaths was cited by the right-wing journal El Alcazar and a list of names was published in Matanzas en el Madrid Republicano, by César Vidal Manzanares, but many of the bodies have never been found.

The minimum figure cited is around 1,000 deaths by Gabriel Jackson in 1967 and Paul Preston in 2006, but that is considerably lower than the estimates of most modern historians. Jackson mentions around 1,000 on 6 and 7 November.

Other historians have put the death toll between 2,000 and 3,000. Hugh Thomas cites 2,000, Beevor at least 2,000, Ledesma 2,200 to 2,500, Julián Casanova 2,700, and Javier Cervera over 2,000 deaths.

Many of the victims are buried at Cementerio de Los Mártires de Paracuellos (40.5116°N 3.547°W).

== See also ==
- List of massacres in Spain
- Republican repression in Madrid (1936–1939)
- Communist terrorism
- Spanish Civil War
- Red Terror
- Red Terror (Spain)
- White Terror (Spain)
- Enforced disappearance#Spain
