= Paracuellos de Jarama =

Paracuellos del Jarama
- Municipality
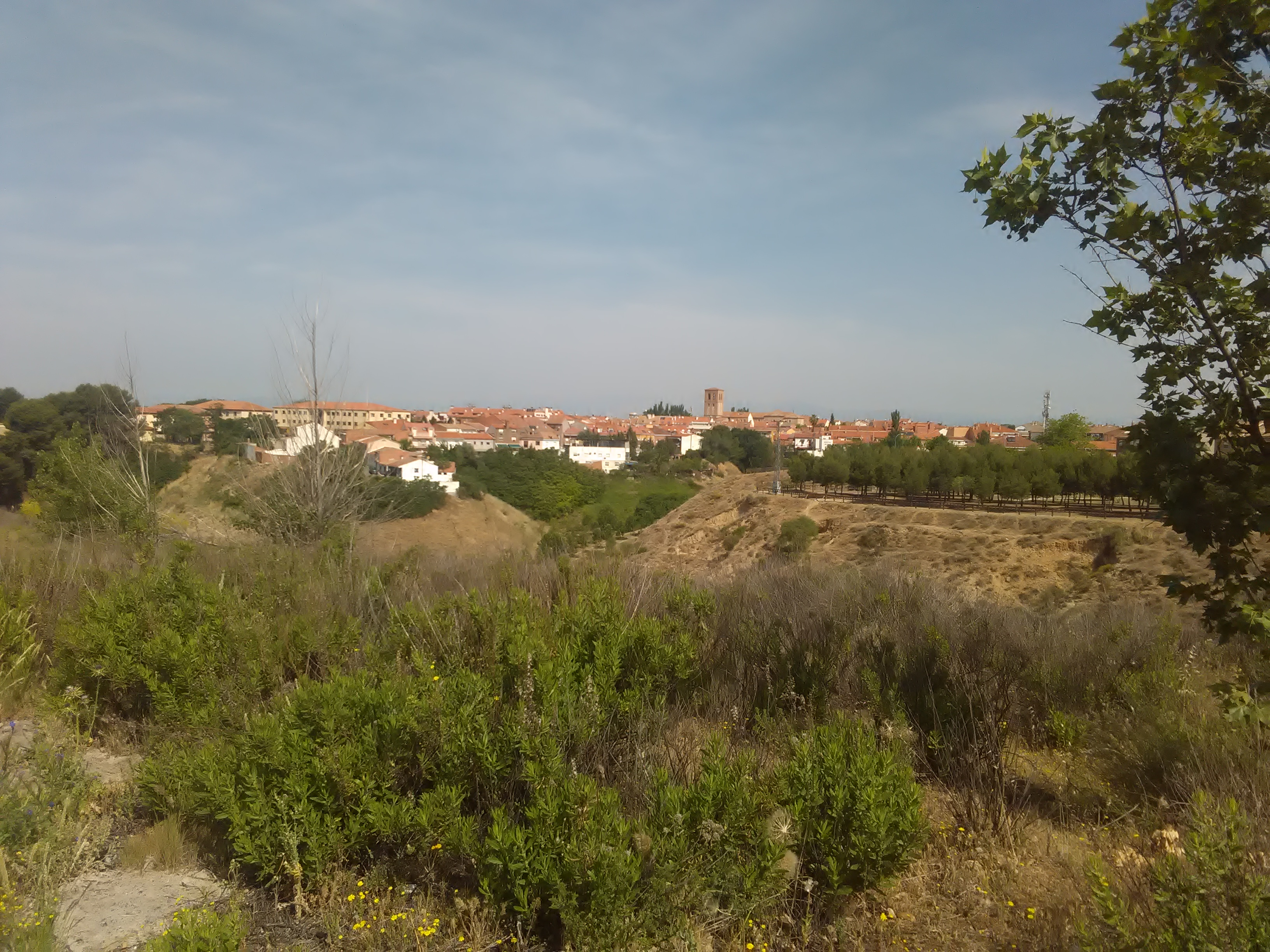
- View of Paracuellos from the south

- Flag Coat of arms

- Location in Spain
- Coordinates: 40°30′17″N 3°31′48″W
- Country: Spain
- Autonomous community: Community of Madrid
- Comarca: Madrid metropolitan area

Government
  - Mayor: Mesa

Area
  - Total: 16.96 sq mi (43.92 km^{2})
- Elevation: 2,152 ft (656 m)

Population (2025-01-01)
  - Total: 27,650
  - Density: 1,631/sq mi (629.6/km^{2})
- Time zone: UTC+1 (CET)
  - Summer (DST): UTC+2 (CEST)
- Postal code: 28860
- Website: Official website

Paracuellos del Jarama is a small town and municipality in the Community of Madrid, Spain. It is located northeast from Madrid and very close to Madrid-Barajas Airport. The etymology of the name is unclear.

In 1936, it (along with Torrejón de Ardoz) was the site of the Paracuellos massacres.

== Transport ==
=== Urban lines ===
- Line 1: Altos de Jarama urbanization - Miramadrid
- Line 2: Picón del cura - Los Berrocales urbanization
- Line 3: Industrial estate - C.C. San Fernando

=== Interurban lines ===
- 210: San Sebastián de los Reyes (Infanta Sofía Hospital) - Paracuellos del Jarama
- 211: Madrid (Canillejas) - Paracuellos del Jarama
- 212: Madrid (Canillejas) - Paracuellos del Jarama (Miramadrid)
- 213: Madrid (Canillejas) - Belvis
- 215: Torrejón de Ardoz - Paracuellos del Jarama
- 256: Madrid (Canillejas) - Daganzo de Arriba - Valdeavero
- 263: Madrid (Barajas) - Cobeña - Algete
