= Segundo Serrano Poncela =

Spanish Republican politician, writer, literary critic and essayist

Segundo Serrano Poncela (1912 – 9 December 1976) was a Spanish Republican politician, writer, literary critic, and essayist associated with the Generation of '36 movement. He was a contributor to Claridad, the periodical of Francisco Largo Caballero, as well as a member of the Defense Council of Madrid, in which capacity he signed the orders for the removal from the prisons of Madrid various inmates who were subsequently massacred. At the end of the Spanish Civil War he went into exile in Latin America, where he taught literature.

== Life ==
Born in Madrid, Serrano obtained a Bachelor of Arts at the Facultad de Filosofía y Letras in the University of Madrid, and later earned a law degree. As a student he joined the Socialist Youth of Spain (FJS). Like most of the members, he belonged to the Caballerist wing that was opposed to the tendencies led by Julián Besteiro and Indalecio Prieto. He was one of the editors of Renovación, an organ of the FJS, and joined the executive of the FJS in 1934. He took part in the negotiations over the unification with the Communist Youth, and after the creation of the Unified Socialist Youth (JSU), he formed part of its executive. Along with most of the other JSU directors who had originated from the FJS, he joined the Communist Party on 6 November 1936. He was immediately named deputy of public order for the Defense Council of Madrid at the orders of Santiago Carrillo, secretary general of the JSU and a fellow veteran of the FJS. He remained in the office until 27 November, when, depending on the source, he either resigned or was dismissed by Santiago Carrillo. During his time in that post, he had signed the orders that resulted in the removal, throughout the months of November and December, of various nationalist inmates from the Madrid prisons. Most of these prisoners would eventually be massacred.

Serrano Poncela remained part of the executive of the JSU until the end of the Civil War, after which he went into exile and abandoned politics entirely. The rest of his life would be spent teaching literature at various Latin American universities.

At the time of his exile, Serrano Poncela already had some experience as a writer. In 1935 he had written a political essay about the failed Revolution of 1934, The Socialist Party and the conquest of power, with a prologue by Luis Araquistáin. While teaching at the University of Santo Domingo, he embarked on a literary career in earnest, becoming sole editor of the literary review Panorama. He also collaborated with other Spanish Republican publications, such as Realidad / Revista de ideas, published in Argentina from 1947 to 1948, and Cuadernos del Congreso por la Libertad de la Cultura, published in Paris beginning in May 1953.

After a period teaching in the Dominican Republic and Puerto Rico, he was hired by the Central University of Venezuela, where he served as professor of cultural history, literary theory, and Spanish literature. He remained there until the founding in 1970 of Simón Bolívar University, whose rector, Eloy Lares Martínez, invited him to organize and head the new university's department of social sciences and humanities.

Serrano Poncela's oeuvre comprises essays as well as works of fiction, both short stories and novels, derived from his experiences during the Spanish Civil War and in exile afterward.

== Works ==
=== Fiction ===
- Seis relatos y uno más (1954), short stories
- La venda (1956), short stories
- La raya oscura (1959), short stories
- La puesta de Capricornio (1960), short stories
- Un olor a crisantemo (1961), short stories
- Habitación para hombre solo (1963), novel
- El hombre de la cruz verde (1973), probably his greatest work of fiction, a historical novel about the Spanish Inquisition during the reign of Philip II.
- La viña de Nabot (1979), novel set during the Spanish Civil War; published posthumously.

=== Essays ===
- El pensamiento de Unamuno (1953)
- Antonio Machado, su mundo y su obra (1954)
- Prosa moderna en la lengua española (1955)
- Huerto de Melibea (1959)
- El secreto de Melibea y otros ensayos (1959)
- Dostoiewuski menor (1959)
- Del Romancero a Machado (1962)
- Formas de vida hispánica (Garcilaso, Quevedo, Godoy y los ilustrados) (1963)
- Estudios sobre Dostoievski (1972).
