= Spanish Revolution of 1936 =

Workers' social revolution in the Spanish Republic

Spanish Revolution
- Part of the Spanish Civil War
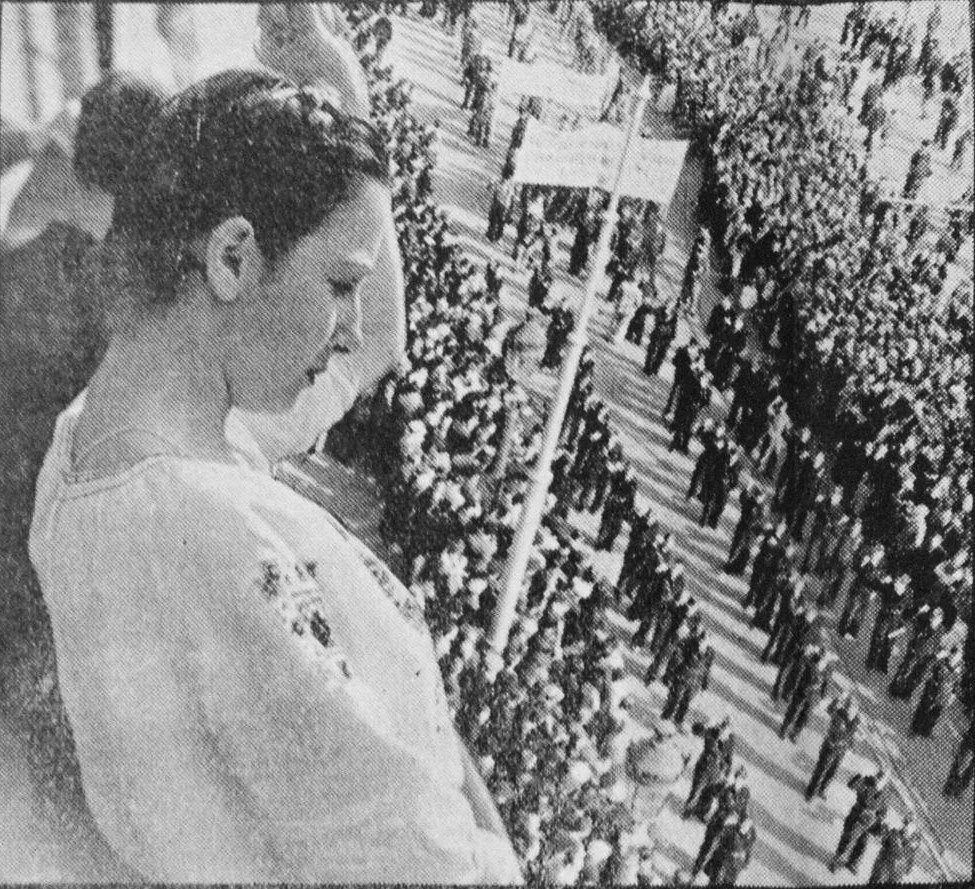
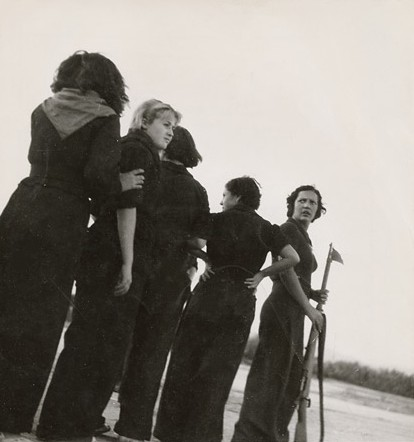
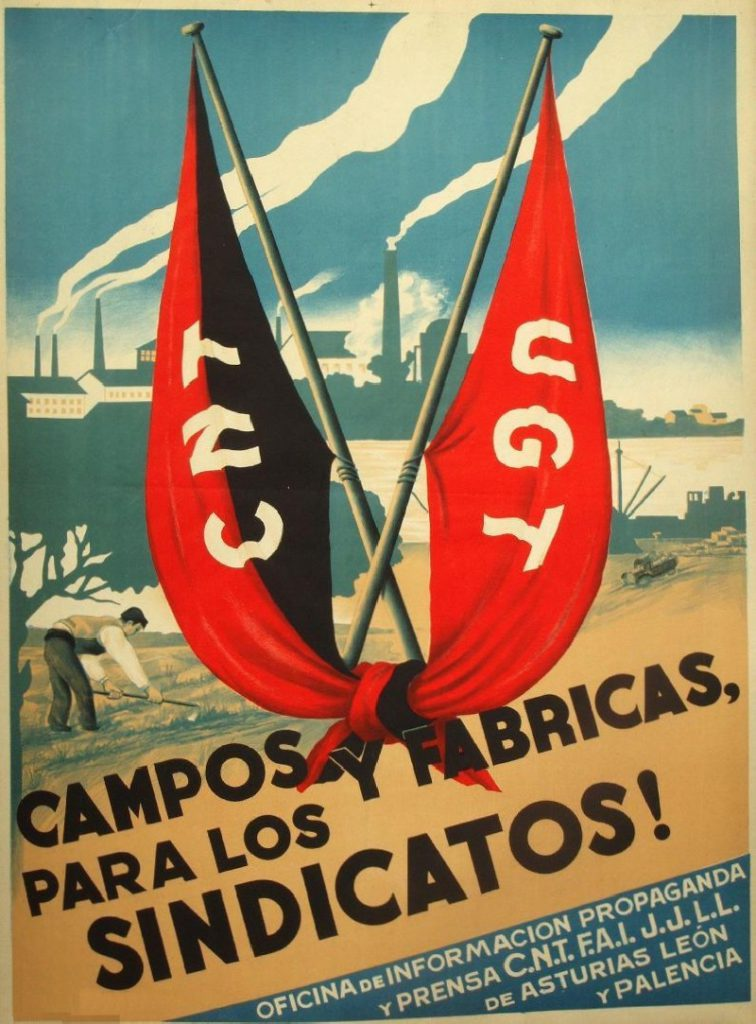
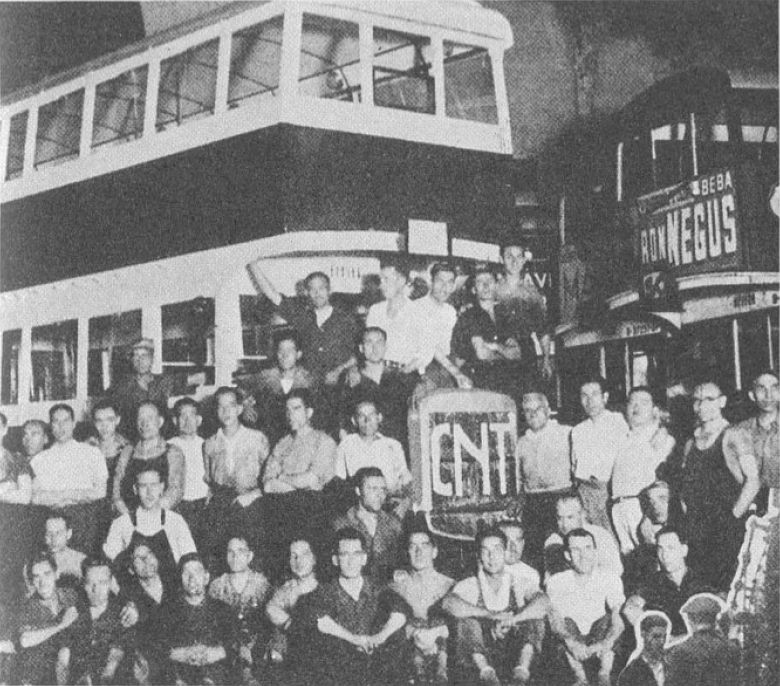
- Clockwise from top left: A demonstration celebrating the 19th anniversary of the Bolshevik Revolution.; Women training for a militia outside Barcelona, August 1936; The first bus built in the workshops of the General Autobus, collectivized by the CNT-FAI; A poster promoting the cooperation between the CNT-FAI and the UGT.
- Date: 19 July 1936 – between 1937 and 1 April 1939
- Location: Various regions of Spain – primarily Madrid, Catalonia, Aragon, Andalusia, and parts of Levante, Spain.
- Methods: Local seizure of power, workplace collectivization, municipalization of public services, political assassination
- Result: Suppression of revolutionary parties after ten-month period (May Days); End of revolutionary management principles with the victory of the Nationalists and the dissolution of the Republic

The Spanish Revolution was a social revolution that began at the outbreak of the Spanish Civil War in 1936, following the attempted coup to overthrow the Second Spanish Republic and arming of the worker movements and formation of militias to fight the Nationalists. It featured takeover of power at local levels by the Spanish workers' organizations and social movements, seizure and reorganization of economic facilities directed by trade union groups and local committees, and widespread implementation of socialist, more narrowly, libertarian socialist organizational principles throughout various portions of the Republican zone, primarily Catalonia, Aragon, Andalusia, and parts of the Valencian Community.

Much of the economy of Spain was put under worker control; in anarchist strongholds like Catalonia, the figure was as high as 75%. Factories were run through worker committees, and agrarian areas became collectivized and run as libertarian socialist communes. Many small businesses, such as hotels, barber shops, and restaurants, were also collectivized and managed by their former employees. The revolutionary principles implemented with the revolution continued to evolve as much as the Republican zone existed, until the end of the civil war with the victory of the Nationalists.

The character of the revolution has been described as collectivist and pluralist, carried out by a variety of distinct, often mutually competitive and hostile, political forces and parties; the main forces behind the socioeconomic and political changes were the anarcho-syndicalists of the Confederación Nacional del Trabajo (CNT, National Confederation of Labor) and the Federación Anarquista Ibérica (FAI, Iberian Anarchist Federation), the revolutionary socialists of the Partido Socialista Obrero Español (PSOE, Spanish Socialist Workers' Party), and also the Marxist party Partido Obrero de Unificación Marxista (POUM, Workers' Party of Marxist Unification).

The collectivization effort, which took place rather in agriculture than in industry, was primarily organized by the CNT and the UGT; the collectives could be organized wholly by one of the two trade unions, or by both of them as joint organizations, with the POUM, the Communist Party of Spain (PCE) and sometimes the Republican Left also participating in some areas. Along with collectivization, the revolution produced a variety of other changes, including socialization of industry, which meant workers' control over enterprises or, more broadly, over an entire branch of production; in order to achieve the latter, small production and trade plants were disestablished, and their personnel was concentrated in bigger plants, or grouped together and coordinated into cartels.

The late Second Spanish Republic and the Nationalists under Francisco Franco suppressed the revolution in their respective territories after its third phase in 1937.

== History ==
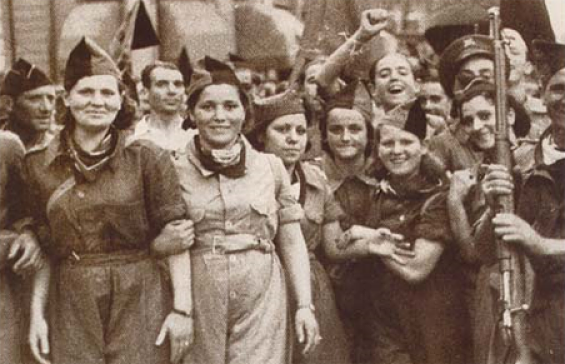
Anarchist milicianas during the revolution in 1936.

On 17 July 1936, the Spanish Coup of July 1936 began. On 18 July, the ongoing military uprising led to a collapse of the republican state (four governments succeeded each other in a single day) and to the coercive structures of the state being dissolved or paralyzed in the places where the coup plotters did not seize power. By then, the CNT had approximately 1,577,000 members and the UGT had 1,447,000 members. On 19 July, the uprising reached Catalonia, where the workers took up arms, stormed the barracks, erected barricades, and eventually defeated the military.

=== First phase of the revolution (July–September 1936): The summer of anarchy ===
The CNT and UGT unions called a general strike from 19 to 23 July, in response to both the military uprising and the apparent apathy of the state towards it. Despite the fact that there were specific records in previous days of the distribution of weapons among civilian sectors, it was during the General Strike when groups of trade unionists, linked to the convening unions and smaller groups, assaulted many of the weapons depots of the state forces, independently of whether they were in revolt against the government or not.

Already in these first weeks, two groups were established within the anarcho-syndicalist revolutionary sectors: the radical group, fundamentally linked to the Iberian Anarchist Federation (FAI) and through it to the CNT, which understood the phenomenon in which it participated as a traditional revolution; and the possibilist group, made up of members of a more moderate sector of the CNT, which expressed the convenience of participating in a broader front, later called the Popular Antifascist Front (FPA), the result of adding the unions to the electoral coalition Popular Front.

Emblem of the CNT.

At the same time, administrative structures were formed outside the state, most of a local or regional character, but exceeding such limits in specific cases; some of the most important were:

- Central Committee of Antifascist Militias of Catalonia
- Popular Executive Committee of Valencia
- Regional Defense Council of Aragon
- Malaga Public Health Committee
- Gijón War Committee
- Popular Committee of Sama de Langreo
- Santander Defense Council
- Madrid Defense Council
- Council of the Cerdanya
- Antifascist Committee of Ibiza

In a few days, the fronts of the Spanish Civil War were established, one of the main fronts, in the context of the revolution, being that of Aragon. On 24 July 1936, the first voluntary militia left Barcelona in the direction of Aragon. It was the Durruti Column, of around 3,000 people, mostly workers coordinated by Buenaventura Durruti, who first implemented libertarian communism in the municipalities through which they passed. In addition, other popular military structures were formed, such as the Iron Column and the Red and Black Column, the latter also departing for Aragon. All this movement gave rise to an extraordinary concentration of anarchists in parts not taken by the rebel military. The arrival, on the one hand, of the thousands of anarchist militiamen from Catalonia and Valencia, and the existence, on the other, of a large rural Aragonese popular base allowed for the progressive development of the largest collectivist experiment of the revolution.

During this first phase most of the Spanish economy was brought under the control of workers organized by the unions; mainly in anarchist areas such as Catalonia. This phenomenon extended to 75% of the total industrial sector, but in the areas of socialist influence, the rate wasn't so high. The factories were organized by workers' committees, the agricultural areas became collectivized and functioned as libertarian communes. Even places such as hotels, hairdressers, means of transport, and restaurants were collectivized and managed by their own workers.

The British author George Orwell, best known for his anti-authoritarian works Animal Farm and Nineteen Eighty-Four, was a soldier in the Lenin Division of the CNT-allied Partido Obrero Unificación Marxista (POUM; Workers' Party of Marxist Unification). Orwell meticulously documented his first-hand observations of the civil war, and expressed admiration for the social revolution in his book Homage to Catalonia.

I had dropped more or less by chance into the only community of any size in Western Europe where political consciousness and disbelief in capitalism were more normal than their opposites. Up here in Aragon one was among tens of thousands of people, mainly though not entirely of working-class origin, all living at the same level and mingling on terms of equality. In theory it was perfect equality, and even in practice it was not far from it. There is a sense in which it would be true to say that one was experiencing a foretaste of Socialism, by which I mean that the prevailing mental atmosphere was that of Socialism. Many of the normal motives of civilized life – snobbishness, money-grubbing, fear of the boss, etc. – had simply ceased to exist. The ordinary class-division of society had disappeared to an extent that is almost unthinkable in the money-tainted air of England; there was no one there except the peasants and ourselves, and no one owned anyone else as his master.

— George Orwell

The communes were operated according to the basic principle of "From each according to their ability, to each according to their need." In some places, money was eliminated, replaced by vouchers. Under this system, the cost of goods was often little more than a quarter of the previous cost. During the revolution, 70% of rural areas were expropriated in Catalonia, about 70% in Eastern Aragon, 91% in the republican sector of Extremadura, 58% in Castilla-La Mancha, 53% in republican Andalusia, 25% in Madrid, 24% in Murcia, and 13% in the Valencian Community. 54% of the expropriated area of republican Spain was collectivized, according to IRA data. The provinces where rural communes became most important were those of Ciudad Real – where 1,002,615 hectares (98.9% of cultivated lands) were collectivized in 1938 – and Jaén – where 685,000 hectares (76.3% of cultivated lands) were collectivized, leaving the rest of the republican provinces far behind. Many communes held out until the end of the war. Anarchist communes produced at a more efficient rate than before being collectivized, with productivity increasing by 20%. The newly liberated zones worked on entirely libertarian principles; decisions were made through councils of ordinary citizens without any bureaucracy.

In Aragon, where libertarian communism was proclaimed as the columns of libertarian militias passed, approximately 450 rural communes were formed, practically all of them in the hands of the CNT, with around 20 led by the UGT.

In the Valencian area, 353 communes were established, 264 led by the CNT, 69 by the UGT and 20 with mixed CNT-UGT leadership. One of its main developments was the Unified Levantine Council for Agricultural Export (Catalan: Consell Llevantí Unificat d'Exportació Agrícola, CLUEA) and the total socialization of the industries and services of the city of Alcoy.

In Catalan industry, the CNT workers' unions took over numerous textile factories, organized the trams and buses in Barcelona, established collective enterprises in fishing, in the footwear industry, and even in small retail stores and public shows. In a few days, 70% of industrial and commercial companies in Catalonia – in which, by itself, two-thirds of the industry of Spain was concentrated – had come under worker control.

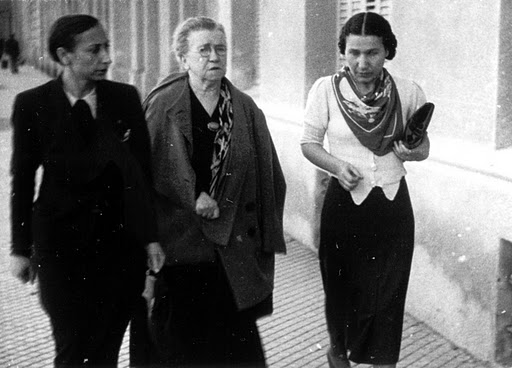
Lucía Sánchez Saornil and Emma Goldman.

Alongside the economic revolution, there was a spirit of cultural and moral revolution: the libertarian athenaeums became meeting places and authentic cultural centers of theoretical education, in which were organized literacy classes, talks on health, excursions to the countryside, public access libraries, theatrical performances, political gatherings, sewing workshops, etc. Numerous rationalist schools were founded, which expanded the existing offers of athenaeums and union centers and in which the educational postulates of Francesc Ferrer i Guardia, Ricardo Mella, Leo Tolstoy, and Maria Montessori were carried out. Similarly, in the social field, some traditions were considered oppressive, and bourgeois morality was also seen as dehumanizing and individualistic. Anarchist principles defended the conscious freedom of the individual and the natural duty of solidarity among human beings as an innate tool for the progress of societies. Thus, for example, during the revolution, abortion was legalized in Catalonia, the idea of consensual free love became popular, and there was a rise in naturism.

However, the social effects of the revolution were less drastic than the economic ones; while there were some social changes in larger urban areas (Barcelona emphasised a "proletarian style" and Catalonia set up inexpensive abortion facilities), the attitudes of the lower classes remained fairly conservative and there was comparatively little emulation of Russian-style "revolutionary morality".

Public order also varied substantially, getting by without the classic forces of public order (the police, Civil Guard, courts, and the army), which were supplanted by the Control Patrols made up of volunteers, the popular militias, and the neighborhood assemblies that were intended to resolve problems that arose. The doors of many prisons were opened, freeing the prisoners, among whom there were many politicians but also common criminals, with some prisons being demolished.

The anti-fascist Carlo Rosselli, who before Mussolini's accession to power was professor of economics in the University of Genoa, put his judgment in the following words:

In three months Catalonia has been able to set up a new social order on the ruins of an ancient system. This is chiefly due to the Anarchists, who have revealed a quite remarkable sense of proportion, realistic understanding, and organising ability ... all the revolutionary forces of Catalonia have united in a program of Syndicalist-Socialist character: socialisation of large industry; recognition of the small proprietor, workers' control ... Anarcho-Syndicalism, hitherto so despised, has revealed itself as a great constructive force ... I am not an Anarchist, but I regard it as my duty to express here my opinion of the Anarchists of Catalonia, who have all too often been represented to the world as a destructive, if not criminal, element. I was with them at the front, in the trenches, and I have learnt to admire them. The Catalan Anarchists belong to the advance guard of the coming revolution. A new world was born with them, and it is a joy to serve that world.

— Carlo Rosselli

But despite the de facto decomposition of state power, on 2 August the government took one of its first measures to regain control against the revolution, with the creation of the Volunteer Battalions, the embryo of the Spanish Republican Army. Overwhelmed by the revolutionary phenomenon, it also promulgated some symbolic decrees:

- 18 July: Decree declaring the military who participated in the coup to be unemployed.
- 25 July: Decree declaring government employees who sympathize with the coup plotters to be unemployed.
- 25 July: Decree of intervention in industry.
- 3 August: Decree of seizure of the railways.
- 3 August: Decree of intervention in the sale prices of food and clothing.
- 8 August: Decree of seizure of rustic properties.
- 13 August: Decree of closure of religious institutions.
- 19 August (Catalonia): Decree of socialization and unionization of the economy.
- 23 August: Decree of the creation of the People's Courts.

The first tensions also arose between the strategy of the anarchists and the policy of the Communist Party of Spain and its extension in Catalonia, the PSUC; and on 6 August members of the PSUC left the Catalan autonomous government because of anarcho-syndicalist pressures.

=== Second phase of the Revolution (September–November 1936): First Government of Victory ===
Coat of Arms of the Regional Defense Council of Aragon.

Both in this stage and in the previous one, the state was usually limited to legislating in accordance with the faits accomplis of the revolution. However, due to the need for military measures against the rebellious military, from October–November 1936 the unions began to cede control of the columns to the state for the Defense of Madrid, which was directed by a semi-independent body – the Madrid Defense Council, in which all the Popular Front parties were represented, in addition to the anarchists. The beginning of all this progressively greater agreement and rapprochement between the Popular Front parties and the unions was reflected in the formation of Largo Caballero's "first Government of Victory" on 4 September.

Among the measures aimed at legitimizing the activity of the revolutionaries were:

- 17 September: Decree of seizure of convicts' estates by the People's Courts.
- 10 October: Decree creating Emergency Juries.
- 22 October (Catalonia): Decree on collectivisations and workers' control.

Despite this apparent concession to the revolutionaries, the government did not actively intervene in the development of the revolution, as its main objective was to promote and strengthen the army as the foundation stone of the centralized state. In addition to the repeated attempts at the dissolution of the popular war and defense committees, they decreed:

- 16 September: Decree taking government control of the Rearguard Vigilance Militia.
- 28 September: Decree for the voluntary transfer of heads and officers of the popular militias to the Army.
- 29 September: Decree of application of the Code of Military Justice to popular militias.

As the war dragged on, the spirit of the first days of the revolution lessened and friction between the diverse members of the Popular Front began, in part due to the policies of the Communist Party of Spain (PCE), which were established by the foreign ministry of the Stalinist Soviet Union, the largest source of foreign aid to the republic.

The PCE defended the idea that the ongoing Civil War made it necessary to postpone the ongoing social revolution until the republicans won the war. The PCE advocated not to antagonize the middle classes, the grassroots of the republican parties, which could be harmed by the revolution and side with the enemy. In the Popular Front government, there were parties such as the Republican Left, Republican Union, and the Republican Left of Catalonia, supported by the votes and interests of the middle class (civil servants, liberal professionals, small merchants, and landowning peasants).

The anarchists and the POUMistas (left communists) disagreed with the PCE, arguing that the war and revolution were one and the same. They believed that the war was an extension of class struggle, and that the proletariat had defeated the military precisely because of this revolutionary impulse that they had been carrying for years and not because of defending a bourgeois republic. The nationalists represented precisely the class that these revolutionaries were fighting: the rich capitalists, the landowners, the Church, the Civil Guard, and the colonial army.

The militias of the parties and groups that were against the Popular Front government soon found government aid cut off, and their ability to act reduced. Consequently, republicans slowly began to reverse the recent changes made in most areas. During this period, some revolutionary structures approved new programs that subordinated them to the government, which gave rise to the dissolution or beginning of absorption, appropriation, and intervention of the revolutionary structures by the republican state government. The situation in most Republican-held areas slowly began to revert largely to its prewar conditions.

An exception was the consolidation of the collectivist process in Aragon, where thousands of libertarian militiamen from Valencia and Catalonia arrived, and where, before the start of the Civil War, there was the most important anarcho-syndicalist labor base affiliated with the CNT in all of Spain. In the final weeks of September 1936, the assembly called in Bujaraloz by the Regional Committee of the CNT of Aragon, with delegations of the towns and confederated columns, following the directives proposed on 15 September 1936, in Madrid by the National Plenary of Regional members of the CNT, proposed to all political and union sectors the formation of Regional Defense Councils confederated with a National Defense Council that would perform the functions of the central government, and agreed to the creation of the Regional Defense Council of Aragon, which celebrated its first assembly on 15 October of the same year.

Despite this, on 26 September the most radical and anarchist sectors of Catalonia, dominated by the possibilists, began a policy of collaboration with the state, integrating themselves into the autonomous government of the Generalitat de Catalunya, which was reborn in place of the Central Committee of Antifascist Militias of Catalonia, which dissolved itself on 1 October. On the other hand, on 6 October the Regional Defense Council of Aragon was legalized and regulated by decree. The proposed National Defense Council was regulated, aborting its development. Faced with this apparent tolerance, on 9 October a decree by the Generalitat outlawed all local committees in Catalonia, formally replacing them with the municipal councils of the FPA. All these concessions to the institutions were considered by some as a betrayal of the classical principles of anarchism, and received harsh criticism from colleagues. (Note: Federica Montseny, a well-known speaker and member of the CNT, entered the government and ended up being booed by her own colleagues at one of her rallies.)

=== Third phase of the Revolution (November 1936 – January 1937): Second Government of Victory ===
On 2 November, the Popular Executive Committee of Valencia approved a new action program that subordinated it to the policy of Largo Caballero's republican government, which included the CNT members Juan García Oliver, Juan López Sánchez, Federica Montseny, and Juan Peiró. During this month, the Iron Column decided to briefly take Valencia, in protest at the shortage of supplies provided by the Popular Executive Committee, subsequently leading to clashes in the streets of the city between libertarian militias and communist groups, leaving more than 30 dead.

On 14 November, the Durruti Column arrived in Madrid, after giving in to the pressure of the possibilists, who demanded collaboration with the state. On 20 November, Buenaventura Durruti died under suspicious circumstances, fighting in the battle of Madrid, where he had arrived with more than a thousand militiamen from the Front of Aragon.

On 17 December, the Moscow daily Pravda published an editorial that read: "The purge of Trotskyists and anarcho-syndicalists has already begun in Catalonia; it has been carried out with the same energy as in the Soviet Union." The Stalinists had already begun the liquidation of any anti-fascists, collectivizations, and other revolutionary structures that did not submit to the directives of Moscow.

On 23 December, the Gijón War Committee was transformed by decree into the Interprovincial Council of Asturias and León, which was regulated by the republican government and was more moderate in its policies, at the same time as it officially recognized the formation of the National Defense Committee. On 8 January 1937, the Popular Executive Committee of Valencia was dissolved.

During this stage, the government definitely controlled the anarchist popular militias, dissolving them so that they were compulsorily integrated into the Spanish Republican Army, which was under the command of professional officers.

=== The end of the revolution (January 1937 – May 1937) ===
On 27 February 1937, the government banned the FAI's newspaper Nosotros, thus initiating the period during which most of the publications critical of the government began to suffer censorship. The next day it prohibited the police from belonging to political parties or unions, a measure adopted by the Catalan regional government on 2 March. On 12 March, the Generalitat approved an order demanding the seizure of all weapons and explosive materials from non-militarized groups. More confrontations began between the sectors of the FPA; and on 27 March the anarchist advisers of the Catalan autonomous government resigned. During the month of March, the "militarization" of the militias was completed, transforming them into a regular army subject to its disciplinary and hierarchal regimes, against which many anarchist voices rose up.

On 17 April, the day after the ministers of the CNT returned to the Generalitat, a force of Carabineros in Puigcerdá demanded the CNT workers' patrols hand over control of customs on the border with France. Simultaneously, the Civil Guard and Assault Guard were sent to Figueras, and other towns throughout the province of Girona, to remove control of the workers' organizations from the police, dissolving the autonomous Council of Cerdanya. Simultaneously, in Barcelona, the Assault Guard proceeded to disarm the workers in public view, in the streets.

During May 1937, confrontations between the supporters of the revolution and those opposed to it intensified. On 13 May, after the events of the Barcelona May Days, the two Communist ministers, Jesús Hernández Tomás and Vicente Uribe, proposed to the government that the National Labor Confederation (CNT) and the Workers' Party of Marxist Unification (POUM) be punished, bringing into practice repression against the latter party. On 16 May, Largo Caballero resigned, which was followed by the formation of a socialist government under Juan Negrín, but without support from anarchists or revolutionaries.

Fenner Brockway, Secretary of the ILP in England who traveled to Spain after the May events in Catalonia (1937), expressed his impressions in the following words:

"I was impressed by the strength of the C.N.T. It was unnecessary to tell me that it was the largest and most vital of the working-class organisations in Spain. The large industries were clearly, in the main, in the hands of the C.N.T.--railways, road transport, shipping, engineering, textiles, electricity, building, agriculture. At Valencia the U.G.T. had a larger share of control than at Barcelona, but generally speaking the mass of manual workers belonged to the C.N.T. The U.G.T. membership was more of the type of the 'white-collar' worker...I was immensely impressed by the constructive revolutionary work which is being done by the C.N.T. Their achievement of workers' control in industry is an inspiration. One could take the example of the railways or engineering or textiles...There are still some Britishers and Americans who regard the Anarchists of Spain as impossible, undisciplined, uncontrollable. This is poles away from the truth. The Anarchists of Spain, through the C.N.T., are doing one of the biggest constructive jobs ever done by the working class. At the front they are fighting Fascism. Behind the front they are actually constructing the new Workers' Society. They see that the war against Fascism and the carrying through of the Social Revolution are inseparable. Those who have seen and understand what they are doing must honour them and be grateful to them. They are resisting Fascism. They are at the same time creating the New Workers' Order which is the only alternative to Fascism. That is surely the biggest things now being done by the workers in any part of the world." And in another place: "The great solidarity that existed amongst the Anarchists was due to each individual relying on his own strength and not depending on leadership. The organisations must, to be successful, be combined with a free-thinking people; not a mass, but free individuals."

— Fenner Brockway

=== Related subsequent events ===
On 25 May 1937, the FAI was excluded from the People's Courts. On 8 June, the government issued a decree by which it temporarily outlawed rural communes that had not yet been dissolved. On 14 June, a new government of the Generalitat was formed, also without the anarchists and revolutionaries. On 15 June, the POUM was outlawed and its executive committee was arrested. On the 16 June the 29th Division (formerly the POUM's Lenin Division) was dissolved.

In August 1937, criticism of the USSR was prohibited by means of a government circular. In this month, the central government also ordered the dissolution of the Aragón Defense Council, practically the last remaining body of revolutionary power, which was militarily occupied by republican army troops on 10 August. Joaquín Ascaso, its president, was arrested. Likewise, the eleventh communist division attacked various committees of the Aragonese people and dissolved collective agricultural production, which soon after was reorganized. On 7 September, the government reauthorized religious worship in private, one of its many measures to reestablish the power of the government in the republican zone, while in Barcelona there were demonstrations against the dissolution of the anarcho-syndicalist publication Solidaridad Obrera. On 16 September, political rallies were prohibited in Barcelona. On 26 September, the Asturian Council proclaimed itself the Sovereign Council of Asturias and León, independent from the Second Spanish Republic.

On 21 October, a demonstration by anarchist and socialist militants took place in front of the San Miguel de los Reyes prison in Valencia, threatening to break down the doors if the prisoners were not freed. On 12 November, the CNT withdrew from the FPA committees.

On 6 January 1938, the government published a decree prohibiting all new issuances of banknotes and coins by committees, municipalities, corporations, etc.; and a period of one month was given for them to be withdrawn from circulation, in an attempt to end the last remnants of the revolution.

During that year many of the large landowners returned and demanded the return of their property. Collectivization was progressively annulled despite its popular support.

== Social revolution ==
=== Economic ===
The most notable aspect of the social revolution was the establishment of a libertarian socialist economy based on coordination through decentralized and horizontal federations of participatory industrial collectives and agrarian communes. Andrea Oltmares, professor in the University of Geneva, in the course of an address of some length, said:

"In the midst of the civil war the Anarchists have proved themselves to be political organizers of the first rank. They kindled in everyone the required sense of responsibility, and knew how, by eloquent appeals, to keep alive the spirit of sacrifice for the general welfare of the people. "As a Social Democrat I speak here with inner joy and sincere admiration of my experiences in Catalonia. The anti-capitalist transformation took place here without their having to resort to a dictatorship. The members of the syndicates are their own masters and carry on the production and the distribution of the products of labor under their own management, with the advice of technical experts in whom they have confidence. The enthusiasm of the workers is so great that they scorn any personal advantage and are concerned only for the welfare of all."

— Andrea Oltmares

The key developments of the revolution were those related to the ownership and development of the economy in all its phases: management, production, and distribution. This was accomplished through widespread expropriation and collectivization of privately owned resources, in adherence to the anarchist belief that private property is authoritarian in nature.

The economic changes that followed the military insurrection were no less dramatic than the political. In those provinces where the revolt had failed the workers of the two trade union federations, the Socialist UGT and the Anarchosyndicalist CNT, took into their hands a vast portion of the economy. Landed properties were seized; some were collectivized, others were distributed among the peasants, and notarial archives as well as registers of property were burnt in countless towns and villages. Railways, tramcars and buses, taxicabs and shipping, electric light and power companies, gasworks and waterworks, engineering and automobile assembly plants, mines and cement works, textile mills and paper factories, electrical and chemical concerns, glass bottle factories and perfumeries, food-processing plants and breweries, as well as a host of other enterprises, were confiscated or controlled by workmen's committees, either term possessing for the owners almost equal significance in practice. Motion-picture theatres and legitimate theatres, newspapers and printing shops, department stores and bars, were likewise sequestered or controlled as were the headquarters of business and professional associations and thousands of dwellings owned by the upper class.

— Burnett Bolloten

Numerous experiments with management and control of workers and agrarian collectivizations were carried out throughout the republican territory. In some towns and cities, the transformations were spontaneous and took different paths. However, in a large number of cases the first steps were in imitation of those taken in Barcelona.

==== Socialized industry ====
After the coup d'état and the beginning of the civil war, many owners in the republican zone were assassinated, imprisoned, or exiled, thus leaving a multitude of companies and factories without direction. This situation led to the takeover of such entities, sometimes amounting to entire industries, by the unions. Within the industrial sphere the revolution was carried out in different ways. These differences radiated from numerous factors: the disappearance of the owner, the strength and political orientation of the workers' organizations, the existence of foreign capital in the company itself, or even the destination of its products. Faced with this situation, there were three major orientations:

- Workers' control occurred where the existence of foreign capital limited the revolutionary capacity of the workers
- Nationalization occurred in companies with management sympathetic to Soviet communism, and later in all war industries
- Socialization occurred in those industries that did not have a large volume of foreign capital and the political affiliation approached or defended the postulates of the CNT-FAI.

At the beginning of the war, 70% of all the industry in Spain was in Catalonia, which, as the nerve center of the CNT and Spanish anarchism, gave it a great importance within the revolutionary process, being one of the places where some of the most radical revolutionary experiments took place. In all the places where industrial measures were carried out, it is necessary to look at certain factors, such as the type of industry or the implantation of the different workers' organizations and political parties, especially at the beginning of the revolution, when the actions were more broad, when workers had greater freedom of movement and the state had no capacity to oppose them.

===== Socialization =====
Socialization consisted of the management of the industry by the workers themselves. On the practical level, it resulted in the abolition of private property by collective management and property, based on the principles of direct action and the anti-authoritarianism of anarchism. In this case, management fell to a board of directors made up of less than fifteen people, in which all the productive and service levels of the company were involved, and in which the trade union centrals had to be proportionally represented. This council was elected in a workers' assembly to which they were responsible. The benefits were distributed among: workers, company, and for social purposes. Within each company was a reserve fund that the assembly could decide to use for social purposes, such as contributions to regional credit unions, the unemployed, or as investments in education and health.

===== Nationalization =====
Nationalization denoted the management of the industry by the state. It resulted in the abolition of private property and management. The boards of directors were controlled by the state, and the benefits were adduced to the state and the company itself. It was the choice that the Communist Party defended, since in this way it could weaken the economic power that the CNT held.

===== Worker control =====
Worker control involved the creation of workers' committees that would be in charge of controlling working conditions, the cash movements of the companies, and the control of production of companies that remained in private hands, excepting only those that did not have enough personnel to meet the conditions of belonging to a committee. These committees were made up of between three and nine members, they were made up of representatives of the two unions, in a proportional manner, and of all the services and industries that the company dealt with. These representatives were elected in an assembly of the center, an assembly in which it was decided whether a committee also had the right to sign for the movements of funds, the frequency of meetings between the committee and the patron, and the frequency of meetings between them. Committee membership was not remunerated, a term lasted two years, with eligibility for reelection. Members were responsible, for their management of a company, to the assembly of the company and to the General Council of Industry. A committee approved the hours, salary increases and decreases, changes of categories or workplace, and notifications of absences to workers. A committee had to meet once a week to discuss the employer's proposals and to ensure compliance with the official provisions. The employer representation still had the power of the legal representation of the company, the power to contract, the custody of the box, and the signature and the fixing of their remuneration. If the company had a corporation or other commercial model as a legal entity, a member of the committee had to attend the council meetings with voice but without a vote.

==== Salary ====
Remuneration for work was one of the points of friction between the anarchist and Marxist views during the revolutionary stage. While the anarchist organizations defended a single family salary, the Marxist organizations defended a staggered salary according to the type of work that was carried out. These differences were motivated by the differing conceptions of the individual and by motivating the individual as a producer. In the first place, while anarchism understands the individual as a subject with needs that must be met, Marxism understands the individual as a producer. Secondly, anarchism holds to the concept that the worker will strive to produce and improve the process while controlling the productive activity. Marxism, on the other hand, understands that the worker will try harder in exchange for receiving a higher remuneration.

==== Examples of collectivized industries ====
===== Film industry =====
The CNT's Entertainment Union was a model of organization and operation in the confederated media. It was significant that, between 20 and 25 July, the cinemas and theaters of Barcelona were one of the first and most resoundingly successful occupations by the activists from Barcelona's CNT. On 26 July, a Technical Commission was put in charge of preparing a project that defined the new framework of work in cinemas and theaters. That same day, the Catalan Generalitat, overwhelmed by events, created the Comisaría d'Espectacles de Catalunya which was not successful; the production of workers organized through the CNT union completely took over production.

From 6 August to May 1937, revolutionary enthusiasm organized and energized all the cinematographic and theatrical activities in Barcelona. The project began by standardizing wages for all job types in the film industry. Sickness, disability, old age, and forced unemployment benefits were established permanently. This whole system employed about 6,000 people and supported 114 cinemas, 12 theaters, and 10 music halls during that period. An opera company was even created at the Tivoli theater, in an attempt to bring the genre closer to the general public.

It can be said that it was one of the sectors that functioned the best economically, even building some cinemas such as the Ascaso (today's Vergara). Others were reformed or were finished building, such as the Durruti cinema (now the Arenas cinema).

At the political level, the collectivization of cinema was a new way of understanding art radically opposed to the bourgeois and capitalist system. There was no unity of criteria in the creative process, dogmatism was not allowed behind the scenes, and the "seventh art" incorporated a new form of journalism by taking cameras out into the street, to film what was happening there. A popular mobilization emerged to tell what they saw, and the message emerged as counter-information. The information of the people thus replaced that of power.

Between 1936 and 1937, more than a hundred films were produced, promoted by the production company and the distributor created by the CNT. The documentary genre was undoubtedly the most accomplished, as war news inevitably pushed out any other activity. SIE Films (Syndicate of the Entertainment Industry) and Spartacus Films were created for the production of films. The Union had two large studios with three plateaux for filming, and the "Palace of Belgium" was set up on the premises of Montjuïc, for auxiliary services of sets and extras. However, the repression of May 1937 strangled the Social Revolution in the streets of Barcelona and, although films continued to be made, the previous production rate slowed considerably.

Anarchist film production was a large part of the creative life in Catalonia at the time; and it spread to Aragon, Madrid, and Levante through different models, adapting to the circumstances of towns and cities and the working people who made them possible. Although productive activity in Madrid was less important than in Barcelona, 24 films were shot, both documentaries and fictional.

===== Woodworking industry =====
Between 7,000 and 10,000 people worked in this industry during the Civil War. Shortly after the general strike, when workers returned to their companies and workshops, woodworkers began to socialize. They began by seizing the companies, and through a general plan to rationalize efforts and resources, they closed the workshops that did not meet sufficient health and safety conditions, regrouping them to have large and clear premises. Although at the beginning there were still small workshops, later they were also added to the socialization.

After a few months of spontaneity, efforts were coordinated until the 8-hour day, standardization of wages, improvement of working conditions, and the increase of production were achieved. Socialization was implemented throughout all phases of production: sawmill, joinery, and carpentry.

A professional school and libraries were created, there was even a Socialized Furniture Fair in 1937. Coordination was achieved with the socialized wood industry of the Levante, to manufacture different types of furniture and not to compete. Although some exchanges are carried out through barter (with other socialized branches, or with some agrarian communities), in most cases they had to use money.

==== The agrarian communities ====
The trend of latifundismo in the Spanish countryside led to widespread unrest among the peasantry. The confiscations of the 19th century had failed to substantially modify the structure of land ownership and the republic's agrarian reform process had not fulfilled the expectations for change. Thus, as a result of the coup d'état, a revolutionary process began in which the peasants expropriated from the landowners and organized self-managed communities based on collective ownership of the means of production. This phenomenon has been called "collectivization". The collectivities were created through different means. In regions that the nationalists had not seized, the municipalities and the peasants themselves initiated collectivization.

Thus was formed a collective labor regime in which the lands of the aristocrats and landowners were expropriated and joined with the lands of other collectives. Animals, tools, and work were all held and done collectively. Periodic assemblies were held to direct what the community was doing, as well as negotiate with other communities and encourage exchange. Most of these collectives were born in response to the lands that were left empty or were seized by committees after the coup d'état. The IRA counted between 1,500 and 2,500 communities throughout Spain. These collectives came to be territorially organized as was the case in Aragon, in Castile with the unification of the peasant federations, or in Levante with the creation of the CLUEA. Throughout the war they were present in the political and economic approaches of each faction, being in a way another of the ideological battlefields within the republican side.

The union or departure from the collective community was free. If a small owner wanted to continue working the land on their own, they could do so as long as they did not hire anyone. The UGT-organized National Federation of Land Workers (FNTT), which had more than half a million affiliates, was largely in favor of the collectives.

In Barcelona the communities exercised a management role similar to collectives, without employers, as everything was controlled by their own workers. City services such as urban transport were managed by collective communities. In the countryside of Aragon, the Valencian Community and Murcia, the agrarian communities acted as communes. The business role was joined to that of an institution that replaced the local powers of the municipalities in which they were created, in many cases abolishing money and private property (one of the principles of socialist anarchist society). Some of the most significant Aragonese communities were those of Alcañiz, Alcorisa, Barbastro, Calanda, Fraga, Monzón, and Valderrobres. In mid-February 1937, a congress was held in Caspe, the purpose of which was to create a federation of collectives attended by 500 delegates representing 80,000 Aragonese collectivists. Along the Aragon front, the Anarchist-influenced Council of Aragon, chaired by Joaquín Ascaso, had assumed control of the area. Both the Council of Aragon and these communities were not well regarded by the government of the republic; so, on 4 August the Minister of National Defense, Indalecio Prieto, issued orders to the 11th Division of Commander Enrique Líster to be sent on "maneuvers" to Aragon, and dissolving the Council of Aragon on 11 August.

In Aragon, agrarian collectives were formed that were structured by work groups of between five and ten members. To each work group, the community assigned a piece of land for which it was responsible. Each group elected a delegate who represented their views at community meetings. A management committee was responsible for the day-to-day running of the community. This committee was in charge of obtaining materials, carrying out exchanges with other areas, organizing the distribution of production, and the public works that were necessary. Its members were elected in general assemblies in which all the people who made up the community participated.

In many villages and towns money was even abolished and replaced by vouchers signed or stamped by committees. Although some communities had problems with the republican authorities (e.g. the dissolution in Aragon), others, such as those of Castilla, Region of Murcia, and Andalusia, could function with more or less success until 1939, when they were dissolved by Franco's troops.

===== Policy =====
====== Decision making ======
Following libertarian practices, the collectives were governed by structures that can be described as "from the bottom up". That is, all decisions and appointments were made in assembly. In these assemblies all issues concerning the people were discussed. In these same assemblies the progress of the community and the actions to be taken were debated.

====== Federalism ======
On a broader organizational level, the communities aspired to organize themselves into federations, following the example of Aragon. There were congresses in favor of the creation of federations of collectives, but in no case was a more elaborate body than in Aragon ever constituted. There were other cases of federalism, such as CLUEA, the managing body for citrus exports in the Levante.

Among the collectivities there was also exchange, either in the form of barter, with their own paper money or with official currency.

====== Environmentalism ======
The Spanish Revolution undertook several environmental reforms that were possibly the largest in the world at the time. Daniel Guérin notes that anarchist territories would diversify crops, extend irrigation, initiate reforestation, and start tree nurseries. Once there was a link discovered between air pollution and tuberculosis, the CNT shut down several metal factories.

===== Economy =====
The collectives were formed in the villages as a result of the abandonment, expropriation, or accumulation of land and work tools by the peasants. They were made up of people who wanted to belong and the work to be done was divided among the different members. In places where money was not abolished, the salary became in most cases a family salary. Accordingly, it was set according to the number of family members, increasing according to whether they were a couple or had children.

====== Money ======
The economic policies of the anarchist collectives were primarily operated according to the basic communist principle of "from each according to his ability, to each according to his need". One of the most outstanding aspects of the communities was the approach with which they faced the problem of money and the distribution of products. In the villages and towns where money was abolished, different solutions were sought; these ideas varied according to locality and town: vouchers signed or stamped by committees, account books, local coins, ration tables, or individual or family checkbooks. In the cases where money was abolished, it was used to acquire products or tools that the community could not obtain by itself.

In many communities money for internal use was abolished, because, in the opinion of Anarchists, "money and power are diabolical philtres, which turn a man into a wolf, into a rabid enemy, instead of into a brother." "Here in Fraga [a small town in Aragon], you can throw banknotes into the street," ran an article in a Libertarian paper, "and no one will take any notice. Rockefeller, if you were to come to Fraga with your entire bank account you would not be able to buy a cup of coffee. Money, your God and your servant, has been abolished here, and the people are happy." In those Libertarian communities where money was suppressed, wages were paid in coupons, the scale being determined by the size of the family. Locally produced goods, if abundant, such as bread, wine, and olive oil, were distributed freely, while other articles could be obtained by means of coupons at the communal depot. Surplus goods were exchanged with other Anarchist towns and villages, money being used only for transactions with those communities that had not adopted the new system.

— Burnett Bolloten

====== Obstacles ======
The biggest problems that the communities faced were those consequential of the war itself: shortage of raw materials such as fertilizers, seeds, gear, and tools, or the lack of labor due to the mobilization. They also had great problems in their relationship with the state, as the collectives were an expression of power outside the state and also as ideological rivals of the communism that dominated the government. This is how they suffered discrimination in the financing of the IRA, the CLUEA's competition in the Levante, forced unionization in Catalonia, or their forced dissolution in Aragon.

===== State response =====
Once the state was restructured at any of its levels, it tried to stop, direct or at least channel any revolutionary organism. Regarding the collectives, the Minister of Agriculture Uribe drew up a decree of agrarian collectivizations that only sought to channel them. With this decree an excessive importance was given to the individual farmer.

==== The scope of the revolution ====
The figures are often fuzzy. Various numbers have been proposed. Gaston Leval says that there were 3 million people who participated. Vernon Richards talks about 1,500,000. Frank Mintz, in a 1970 study, says it was between 2,440,000 and 3,200,000; but by 1977 he had already revised these figures, placing it at a minimum of 1,838,000 collectivists. Its justification is the following:

Andalusia. The minimum number of agricultural communities is 120 and the maximum of 300, taking an average of 210 with 300 people in each, would be 63,000 people.

Aragon. The figure of 450 communities with 300,000 inhabitants is acceptable. In addition, the UGT had a certain strength, for example 31 communities in Huesca.
Cantabria. The data cited, although minimal, can be noted: a hundred agricultural groups with 13,000 people.
Catalonia. The minimum data for agricultural communities is 297 and the maximum is 400. If we take 350 with 200 people on average, we have 70,000. Taking 80% of the 700,000 workers in the province, we have 560,000 people, that is, with their families, a minimum of 1,020,000.
Center. CNT agricultural collectives with 23,000 families, that is, a minimum of 67,992 people, approximately, to which must be added the UGT collectives, of at least as much, this is 176,000 in agriculture. There were many industrial collectives in the capitals and in the towns. It seems logical to me to consider a minimum of 30,000 people affected.
Extremadura. The figure of 30 groups with an average of 220 people, that is, 6,000 people, should be considered as a maximum for the CNT and the UGT.
Raise. Our estimate is at least 503 groups in agriculture, which would affect 130,000 people. In the industry, the minimum and hypothetical figure is 30,000, which as in the case of the Center is reasonable.

Total. 758,000 collectivists in agriculture and 1,080,000 in industry. We therefore have 1,838,000, a minimum figure as explained at the beginning.

— Frank Mintz. "Self-management in revolutionary Spain". La Piqueta, 1977.

=== The revolution in education ===
Within the educational field there were also important experiments, although, as will be seen, these experiences had great drawbacks preventing carrying out more intense work. One of the most significant changes was due to the fact that education went from being a defensive and destructive field of capitalism to being understood as a fundamental pillar of the construction of the new revolutionary society.

==== Primary and secondary education ====
The New Unified School Council (UNSC), created in Catalonia on 27 July 1936, was entrusted with the task of restructuring the educational system in Catalonia. This organization could be understood as a model of public management of education: free, co-educational, secular, use of the vernacular, and unification of the different educational levels. However, the CENU created a Regional Federation of Rationalist Schools that was outside the UNSC system.

In rural areas, the collectivist movement was forced to intervene more directly than in the cities. Either because there were no educational structures before or because there was greater autonomy, in many rural municipalities the community faced local, professional, or municipal expenses. It was also important obey the statutes of some communities that prohibited child labor.

==== Vocational and technical training ====
Within the field of vocational and technical training, various initiatives were developed. In the industrial field, these were largely the result of the unions, which, knowing that they were lacking in technicians and distrusting them, tried to train members of their organizations. Among these initiatives were numerous schools of particular trades: railways, optics, transporters, metallurgists, and departments dedicated to professional training.

In the agricultural field, federations of trade unions carried out this type of initiative, among which we can find the school of secretaries of Levante, the agricultural university of Moncada, the regional institute of agriculture and livestock, and the school of militants of Monzón.

==== Non-Formal and Cultural Education ====
For informal education there were the libertarian athenaeums, or popular social centers in which different informative, cultural, or work tasks were developed. The athenaeums had a very strong tradition where anarchism was strong. However, in the war they even expanded into areas with few CNT roots. In some cases, such as Madrid, these athenaeums came to create schools, have health insurance, and promote other types of services.

Various communities also carried out other initiatives, such as the creation of libraries, artistic activities, a cinema forum, theater groups, athenaeums, the foundation of its own academies, or nursery schools.

==== Problems faced ====
The problems that had to be faced had two different roots: on the one hand, there were the problems typical of a war, to which others that had been dragging down the educational sphere can be added, and on the other, those typical of the rationalist school movement.

- In the first place, it is necessary to point out the poor school attendance in Spain. (Note: The enrollment rate was around 50%, of which only 70% of those enrolled attended class regularly.) This problem was exacerbated in rural areas, where a large number of municipalities lacked schools or were in a very precarious situation, with many communities still trying to eradicate child labor.
- In a sense similar to the previous point, one of the problems suffered at a general level, and in the rationalist school, in particular was the lack of trained teachers. This problem, which is inseparable from the structural lack of education, was aggravated in rural areas when it coincided with the summer vacation period. The lack of trained teachers was especially incidental in the libertarian sphere, since most of the people who were in charge of the rationalist schools were militants.
- One of the problems that was tried to solve was the lack of coordination between rationalist centers. In most cases, this coordination occurred informally, on the basis of affinity and proximity. The most interesting response in this regard was the Regional Federation of Rationalist Schools of Catalonia, which planned the creation of an editorial and a Rationalist Norm. However, the federation did not have a remarkable evolution.
- And finally, the scarcity of economic and material resources must be pointed out due to the need to maintain a war economy and the economic downturn to which the collectivist movement was subjected. This lack of resources was a fundamental element in understanding the lack of reorganization of the educational structure, with problems such as the lack of endowments, which was sometimes made up with the repurposing of other buildings.

=== The revolution, the Civil War and the militias ===
The coincidence of the revolution and the Spanish Civil War meant that in the military field various initiatives avre developed coordinated by the new administrations established by the revolutionary wave, most of which would be unsuccessful.

==== The Aragon front ====
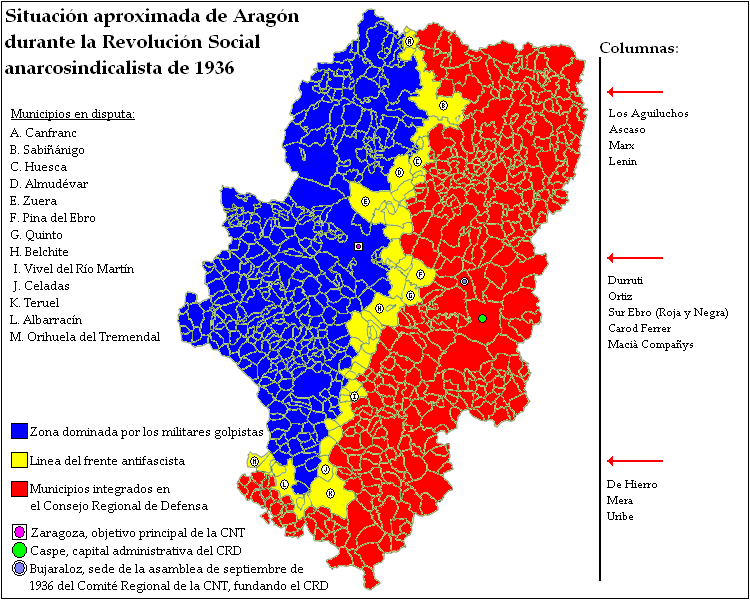
Map of the Aragon front.

This was the first military initiative, developed on 24 July 1936, when the first voluntary militia, the Durruti Column, departed from Barcelona in the direction of Zaragoza. One of the last columns was the Los Aguiluchos Column, which left Barcelona on 28 August in the direction of Huesca. The columns of Barcelona and Lleida headed mainly towards Huesca and Zaragoza, and the Valencian ones towards Teruel, repeatedly besieging the three provincial capitals. At the beginning of September, the Carod-Ferrer Column arrived and was installed around Villanueva de Huerva.

This operation lasted until the end of September, when faced with the imperative of the imminent Battle of Madrid some of the columns gave up their independence, subordinating themselves to the requirements of the government.

==== The Mallorca landings ====
The idea of an expedition to Mallorca had been present since 19 July, when it was taken by the nationalists, along with Ibiza and Formentera. Menorca was the only island in the Balearic archipelago that remained in republican hands. The republicans managed to take back the islands of Ibiza, Formentera, and Cabrera, landing on the island of Mallorca in the area of Punta Amer and Porto Cristo. On 5 September, Bayo's column began the withdrawal from Mallorca, which lasted until 12 September, returning to Barcelona.

The so-called "Mallorca landings" could be considered to have been definitively concluded when on 20 September Francoist troops from Mallorca occupied Formentera.

==== The defense of Madrid ====
The last major operation of the confederal militias took place in November 1936. Buenaventura Durruti, one of the main protagonists of the Revolution, died on 20 November 1936. The resistance of the popular militias, together with the reinforcements of the International Brigades, allowed Madrid to resist the attack of the rebels. In the subsequent defense of the city, numerous anarcho-syndicalists intervened, such as the column led by the Madrilenian Cipriano Mera.

Nevertheless, the confederal militias were militarized into the Spanish Republican Army in 1937.

== Criticisms ==
Criticism of the Spanish Revolution has primarily centered around allegations of coercion by anarchist participants (primarily in the rural collectives of Aragon), which critics charge ran contrary to libertarian organizational principles. Bolloten claims that CNT–FAI reports overplayed the voluntary nature of collectivization, and ignored the more widespread realities of coercion or outright force as the primary characteristic of anarchist organization.

Although CNT-FAI publications cited numerous cases of peasant proprietors and tenant farmers who had adhered voluntarily to the collective system, there can be no doubt that an incomparably larger number doggedly opposed it or accepted it only under extreme duress...The fact is...that many small owners and tenant farmers were forced to join the collective farms before they had an opportunity to make up their minds freely.

He also emphasizes the generally coercive nature of the war climate and anarchist military organization and presence in many portions of the countryside as being an element in the establishment of collectivization, even if outright force or blatant coercion was not used to bind participants against their will.

Even if the peasant proprietor and tenant farmer were not compelled to adhere to the collective system, there were several factors that made life difficult for recalcitrants; for not only were they prevented from employing hired labor and disposing freely as their crops, as has already been seen, but they were often denied all benefits enjoyed by members...Moreover, the tenant farmer, who had believed himself freed from the payment of rent by the execution or flight of the landowner or of his steward, was often compelled to continue such payment to the village committee. All these factors combined to exert a pressure almost as powerful as the butt of the rifle, and eventually forced the small owners and tenant farmers in many villages to relinquish their land and other possessions to the collective farms.

This charge had previously been made by historian Ronald Fraser in his Blood of Spain: An Oral History of the Spanish Civil War, who commented that direct force was not necessary in the context of an otherwise coercive war climate.

[V]illagers could find themselves under considerable pressure to collectivize – even if for different reasons. There was no need to dragoon them at pistol point: the coercive climate, in which 'fascists' were being shot, was sufficient. 'Spontaneous' and 'forced' collectives existed, as did willing and unwilling collectivists within them. Forced collectivization ran contrary to libertarian ideals. Anything that was forced could not be libertarian. Obligatory collectivization was justified, in some libertarians' eyes, by a reasoning closer to war communism than to libertarian communism: the need to feed the columns at the front.

Anarchist sympathizers counter that the presence of a "coercive climate" was an unavoidable aspect of the war that the anarchists cannot be fairly blamed for, and that the presence of deliberate coercion or direct force was minimal, as evidenced by a generally peaceful mixture of collectivists and individualist dissenters who had opted not to participate in collective organization. The latter sentiment is expressed by historian Antony Beevor in his Battle for Spain: The Spanish Civil War, 1936–1939.

The justification for this operation (whose "very harsh measures" shocked even some Party members) was that since all the collectives had been established by force, Líster was merely liberating the peasants. There had undoubtedly been pressure, and no doubt force was used on some occasions in the fervor after the rising. But the very fact that every village was a mixture of collectivists and individualists shows that the peasants had not been forced into communal farming at the point of a gun.

Historian Graham Kelsey also maintains that the anarchist collectives were primarily maintained through libertarian principles of voluntary association and organization, and that the decision to join and participate was generally based on a rational and balanced choice made after the destabilization and effective absence of capitalism as a powerful factor in the region.

Libertarian communism and agrarian collectivization were not economic terms or social principles enforced upon a hostile population by special teams of urban anarchosyndicalists, but a pattern of existence and a means of rural organization adopted from agricultural experience by rural anarchists and adopted by local committees as the single most sensible alternative to the part-feudal, part-capitalist mode of organization that had just collapsed.

There is also focus placed by pro-anarchist analysts on the many decades of organization and shorter period of CNT–FAI agitation that was to serve as a foundation for high membership levels throughout anarchist Spain, which is often referred to as a basis for the popularity of the anarchist collectives, rather than any presence of force or coercion that allegedly compelled unwilling persons to involuntarily participate.

Michael Seidman has suggested there were other contradictions with workers' self-management during the Spanish Revolution. He points out that the CNT decided both that workers could be sacked for "laziness or immorality" and that all workers should "have a file where the details of their professional and social personalities will be registered". He also notes that the CNT Justice Minister, García Oliver, initiated the setting up of "labour camps", and that even the most principled anarchists, the Friends of Durruti, advocated "forced labour". However, Garcia Oliver explained his idealistic vision of justice in Valencia on 31 December 1936; common criminals would find redemption in prison through libraries, sport, and theatre. Political prisoners would achieve rehabilitation by building fortifications and strategic roads, bridges, and railways, and would receive decent wages. Garcia Oliver believed it made more sense for fascist lives to be saved than for them to be sentenced to death. This is in contrast to the policy of mass annihilation of political opponents enacted in the rebel zone during the war.

Some radical commentators have incorporated their views on limitations of the Spanish Revolution into their theories of anti-capitalist revolution. Gilles Dauvé, for example, uses the Spanish experience to argue that to transcend capitalism, workers must completely abolish both wage labour and capital rather than just self-manage them.

In his writings on the Spanish Revolution, Leon Trotsky delivered a series of deprecatory criticisms of the various factions including the POUM and reformist left. He attributed the failures of the Spanish Republic to the oscillating position of the leadership, reformist programmes and organisational ineptitude in erecting mass revolutionary parties. He reserved his strongest condemnation for the Stalinist-allied Communist party for their repressive actions of other left-wing factions which ensured the ascendancy of Franco and the Comintern for abandoning the revolution in favour of maintaining diplomatic parity with the West.

== See also ==
- Anarchism in Spain
- Confederal militias
- Horizontalidad
- Madrid Defense Council
- Popular Executive Committee of Valencia
- Regional Defense Council of Aragon
- Revolutionary Catalonia
- Second Spanish Republic
- Spanish Civil War
- Spanish Coup of July 1936
- Sovereign Council of Asturias and León

== Bibliography ==
=== Principle sources ===
- Andreassi, Alejandro (1996). Libertad también se escribe en minúscula [Freedom is also written in lowercase] (in Spanish). Hacer Editorial. ISBN 84-88711-23-9.
- Borrás, José (1998). Del Radical-Socialismo al Socialismo Radical y Libertario [From Radical-Socialism to Radical and Libertarian Socialism] (in Spanish). Madrid: Fundación Salvador Seguí. ISBN 84-87218-17-2.
- Castells Duran, Antoni (1996). El proceso estatizador en la experiencia colectivista catalana (1936-1939) [The nationalization process in the Catalan collectivist experience (1936-1939)] (in Spanish). Madrid: Nossa y Jara. ISBN 84-87169-83-X.
- Casanova, Julián (1997). De la calle al frente. El anarcosindicalismo en España. (1936-1939) (in Spanish). Barcelona: Crítica. ISBN 84-7423-836-6.
- Bolloten, Burnett (1980). La revolución española. Sus orígenes, la izquierda y la lucha por el poder durante la guerra civil 1936-1937 (in Spanish). Barcelona: Grijalbo. ISBN 84-253-1193-4.
- Enzensberger, Hans Magnus (1972). El corto verano de la anarquía. Vida y muerte de Durruti (in Spanish).
- Gallego, Ferran (2008). La crisis del antifascismo: Barcelona, mayo de 1937 (in Spanish). Barcelona: DeBolsillo. ISBN 978-84-8346-598-1. OCLC 433855847.
- González Martínez, Carmen (1999). Guerra civil en Murcia. Un análisis sobre el poder y los comportamientos colectivos [Civil war in Murcia. An analysis of power and collective behaviors.] (in Spanish). Murcia: Universidad de Murcia. ISBN 84-8371-096-X.
- Leval, Gaston (1975). Collectives in the Spanish Revolution. London: Freedom Press. ISBN 978-1-62963-447-0.
- Mintz, Frank (2013). Anarchism and Workers' Self-Management in Revolutionary Spain. Edinburgh: AK Press. ISBN 9781849350785.
- Orwell, George (2000) [1938]. Homage to Catalonia. London: Secker and Warburg. ISBN 0141183055. OCLC 1154105803.
- Payne, Stanley G. (1970). The Spanish Revolution. London: Weidenfeld & Nicolson. ISBN 0297001248. OCLC 132223.
- Peirats, José (2011). The CNT in the Spanish revolution. Oakland: PM Press. ISBN 9781604862072.
- Pérez Baró, Albert (1974). Treinta meses de colectivismo en Cataluña (in Spanish). Barcelona: Ariel. ISBN 84-344-24-76-2.
- Quilis Tauriz, Fernando (1992). Revolución y guerra civil. Las colectividades obreras en la provincia de Alicante 1936-1939 (in Spanish). Alicante: Instituto de Cultura «Juan Gil-Albert». ISBN 8479080213.
- Sewell, Amber J. (2007). "Las colectividades del Cinca Medio durante la guerra civil (1936-1938)" [The communities of Cinca Medio during the civil war (1936-1938)]. In Sanz Ledesma (ed.). Comarca del Cinca Medio [Middle Cinca region] (PDF) (in Spanish). Tarragona. ISBN 978-84-8380-060-7. Archived from the original (PDF) on 21 November 2011.
- Thomas, Hugh (1961). The Spanish Civil War. London: Eyre & Spottiswoode.
- Tiana Ferrer, Alejandro (1987). Educación libertaria y revolución social. (España, 1936-1939) [Libertarian education and social revolution. (Spain, 1936-1939)] (in Spanish). Madrid: U.N.E.D. ISBN 84-362-2151-6.
- Payne, Stanley G. (2012). The Spanish Civil War. Cambridge University Press. ISBN 9780521174701.

=== Additional sources ===
- Aisa, Ferran (2000). Una historia de Barcelona [A history of Barcelona] (in Spanish). Barcelona: Virus.
- Alba, Víctor (1978). La Revolución española en la práctica, documentos del POUM [The Spanish Revolution in practice, POUM documents] (in Spanish).
- Amorós, Miquel (2009). José Pellicer, el anarquista íntegro. Vida y obra del fundador de la heroica Columna de Hierro [José Pellicer, the complete anarchist. Life and work of the founder of the heroic Iron Column] (in Spanish). Barcelona: Virus. ISBN 978-84-92559-02-2.
- Amorós, Miquel (2003). La revolución traicionada. La verdadera historia de Balius y Los Amigos de Durruti [The revolution betrayed. The true story of Balius and the Friends of Durruti] (in Spanish). Barcelona: Virus. ISBN 84-96044-15-7.
- Amorós, Miquel (2006). Durruti en el Laberinto [Durruti in the Labyrinth] (in Spanish). Bilbao: Muturreko Burutazioak. ISBN 84-96044-73-4.
- Amorós, Miquel (2004). "Los historiadores contra la Historia", en Las armas de la crítica ["Historians against History", in The weapons of criticism.] (in Spanish). Bilbao: Muturreko Burutazioak. ISBN 84-96044-45-9.
- Amorós, Miquel (2011). Maroto, el héroe, una biografía del anarquismo andaluz [Maroto, el héroe, una biografía del anarquismo andaluz] (in Spanish). Virus. ISBN 978-84-92559312.
- Beevor, Antony (2006). Battle for Spain the Spanish Civil War, 1936-1939. New York: Penguin Books. ISBN 0-14-303765-X.
- Berthuin, Jérémie. La CGT-SR et la révolution espagnole - De l'espoir à la désillusion (Juillet 1936-décembre 1937) [The CGT-SR and the Spanish Revolution - From Hope to Disillusion (July 1936-December 1937)] (in French). CNT-RP.
- Bolloten, Burnett (1991). The Spanish Civil War: Revolution and Counterrevolution. Chapel Hill: University of North Carolina. ISBN 0-8078-1906-9.
- Bookchin, Murray (1976). The Spanish Anarchists: The Heroic Years, 1868–1936. Free Life Press. ISBN 187317604X.
- Borkenau, Franz (1937). The Spanish Cockpit: an Eye-Witness Account of the Political and Social Conflicts of the Spanish Civil War. London: Faber & Faber. OCLC 3191955.
- Bosch, Aurora (1983). Ugetistas y libertarios. Guerra civil y Revolución en el País Valenciano, 1936–1939 [Ugetistas and libertarians. Civil War and Revolution in the Valencian Country, 1936–1939] (in Spanish). Valencia: Institución Alfonso el Magnánimo.
- Brenan, Gerald (1962). El Laberinto español [The Spanish Labyrinth] (in Spanish). París: Ruedo Ibérico.
- Fraser, Ronald (1979). Blood of Spain: An Oral History of the Spanish Civil War. New York: Pantheon Books. ISBN 0-394-48982-9.
- Dolgoff, Sam (1974). The Anarchist Collectives: Workers' Self-management in the Spanish Revolution, 1936–1939. Black Rose Books Ltd. ISBN 978-0-919618-20-6.
- García Oliver, Juan (2008). El eco de los pasos (in Spanish). Barcelona: Planeta. ISBN 978-84-08-08253-8.
- Garrido González, Luis (2006). La economía colectivizada de la zona republicana en la Guerra civil (in Spanish). Universidad de Jaén. p. 6. ISBN 978-84-9641-162-3.
- Giménez, Antoine (2004). Del amor, la guerra y la revolución. Recuerdos de la guerra de España del 19 de julio de 1936 al 9 de febrero de 1939 (in Spanish). Logroño: Pepitas de Calabaza.
- Guerin, Daniel (1970). Anarchism: From Theory to Practice. New York: Monthly Review Press. p. 134.
- Guillamón, Agustín (2007). Barricades in Barcelona: The CNT from the victory of July 1936 to the necessary defeat of May 1937. Ediciones Espartaco Internacional. ISBN 978-84-611-5747-1.
- Iglesias, Ignacio (2003). Experiencias de la revolución española (in Spanish). Laertes.
- Kaminski, Hanns-Erich (2002). Los de Barcelona, prefacio de José Peirats (in Spanish). Parsifal ediciones.
- Kelsey, Graham (1991). Anarchosyndicalism, Libertarian Communism, and the State: The CNT in Zaragoza and Aragon, 1930–1937. Dordrecht: Kluwer Academic, International Institute of Social History. p. 161. ISBN 0-7923-0275-3.
- Lorenzo, César M. (1972). Los anarquistas españoles y el poder (in Spanish). Ruedo Ibérico.
- Malefakis, Edward (1970). Agrarian reform and peasant revolution in Spain: origins of the Civil War. New Haven: Yale University Press. ISBN 0300012101. OCLC 70781309.
- McKay, Iain (2012). "I.8 Does revolutionary Spain show that libertarian socialism can work in practice?". An Anarchist FAQ. Oakland/Edinburgh: AK Press. pp. 974–1005.
- Payne, Stanley G. (2011). Civil War in Europe, 1905–1949. Cambridge University Press. ISBN 9780511820465.
- Payne, Stanley G. (1973). A History of Spain and Portugal. Madison, Wisconsin: University of Wisconsin Press. ISBN 0299062708. OCLC 588925.
- Paz, Abel. Journey into the Past (Memoirs 1936-1939).
- Paz, Abel (2006). Durruti in the Spanish revolution. Madrid: AK Press. ISBN 1-904859-50-X.
- Preston, Paul (2012). The Spanish Holocaust: Inquisition and Extermination in Twentieth Century Spain. London: Harper Collins. pp. 388, xiv. ISBN 9780002556347.
- Rocker, Rudolf (2004). Anarcho-Syndicalism Theory and Practice. Oakland, Edinburgh: AK Press. ISBN 1-902593-928.
- Saña, Heleno (2010). La revolución libertaria [The libertarian revolution] (in Spanish). Laetoli.
- Seidman, Michael (1991). Workers against Work: Labor in Paris and Barcelona during the Popular Fronts. Berkeley: University of California Press.
- Semprún Maura, Carlos (1978). Revolución y contrarrevolución en Cataluña (1936–1937) [Revolution and counterrevolution in Catalonia (1936–1937)] (in Spanish). Barcelona: Tusquets.

== Filmography ==
- Vivir la utopia (Living Utopia), Juan Gamero, 1997, documentary about Anarchism in Spain and the collectives in the Spanish Revolution
- Land and Freedom. Ken Loach, 1995, fictionalized adaptation of Orwell's Homage to Catalonia
- Libertarias, Vicente Aranda, 1996, fictional film about the milicianas on the Aragon front
- Butterfly's Tongue, José Luis Cuerda, 1999, coming-of-age film about children in libertarian education
