= 83rd Mixed Brigade =

- Active: March 1937 - March 1939
- Country: Spanish Republic
- Allegiance: Republican faction
- Branch: Spanish Republican Army
- Type: Infantry
- Size: Brigade
- Engagements: Spanish Civil War: Battle of Teruel; Levante Offensive; Siege of Madrid

The 83rd Mixed Brigade was a unit of the Spanish Republican Army created during the Spanish Civil War from the militarization of the Iron Column. It came to operate on the Teruel, Levante and Central fronts.

== History ==
=== Front of Teruel ===
The unit was created in March 1937, on the Teruel front, from the militarization of the Iron Column. The 83rd MB was integrated into the 41st Division, along with other recently militarized forces. Joaquín García-Morato Ruiz was appointed as head of the brigade. It went on to publish its own newspaper, the "Columna de Hierro", printed in Vinaroz.

In July the 83rd MB was sent to the Albarracín sector as reinforcement against the nationalist counteroffensive that followed the Battle of Albarracín. After its arrival in the area, it came to replace the Republican 42nd Division, which was left very broken after the nationalist attacks. At the beginning of August, the brigade was placed in the 64th Division of the 19th Army Corps. During the following days it had to resist the enemy counterattacks, which began on August 4 and lasted until August 21, managing to maintain its positions.

At the end of 1937 the unit, which was still attached to the 64th Division, participated in the Battle of Teruel. On December 16, it participated in the capture of Campillo, subsequently remaining as a support unit. On December 30 the nationalists launched a counteroffensive that sought to lift the siege of Teruel, attacking in the Campillo sector. The 81st Mixed Brigade fell back under enemy pressure, losing Campilo and causing a breach in the front that would also drag the 83rd MB into its retreat. After the republican conquest of the Teruel capital, the unit was located on the left flank of the front, where it saw no outstanding activity.

=== Fighting in Levante ===
At the end of the military operations in Teruel, the 83rd MB was again added to the 41st Division. In mid-April 1938, after the republican zone was cut in two, the unit was added to the Extremadura Division and destined for the coastal sector; attacked by the forces of Rafael García Valiño, the 83rd MB suffered severe attrition and on May 11 it had to be relieved by elements of the 14th Division. The following day the brigade fought in the Albocàsser-Les Coves de Vinromà sector.

In the La Iglesuela del Cid sector, the unit suffered severe damage from enemy attacks, having to give ground; by May 29 it was positioned in the Ares del Maestrat-La Llama sector. A day later, after giving ground and facing the danger of being surrounded, the 83rd MB withdrew together with the entire division towards Albocàsser, and then towards Castellón de la Plana. On June 10, the 83rd MB was covering part of the right flank of Castellón de la Plana, although on June 13 it had to face an enemy attack on the heights of "Choquera"; the brigade launched several counterattacks in the Borriol mountain range, although the assaults it was subjected to finally forced it to withdraw towards the capital of Castellón. After the fall of this city, the unit was withdrawn to the rear to undergo a reorganization.

=== End of the war ===
After the end of the fighting in Levante, the unit was assigned to the 73rd Division, remaining as a general reserve of the Central Region Army Group (GERC). On March 8, 1939, under the rule of the National Defence Council, the 83rd MB was sent to Madrid in support of the Casadista forces, where it collaborated in the assault on the Jaca Position. Later it advanced on the urban center of Madrid, in support of the forces of Armando Álvarez Álvarez. (Note: During the Casado coup, Álvarez commanded a special group of soldiers and assault guards specialized in street fighting.)

== Controls ==
Commanders

- Joaquín García-Morato Ruiz (Note: Some sources indicate that José Pellicer Gandía, former commander of the Iron Column, served as commander of the brigade.)

Commissioners

- José Segarra Puig;
- Ernesto Orgaz Grau

Chiefs of Staff

- Emilio Soler Serrano;
- Francisco Cardona Rosell;

== See also ==
- Iron Column
- Mixed Brigades

== Bibliography ==
- Alpert, Michael (1989). El ejército republicano en la guerra civil (in Spanish). Siglo XXI Editores.
- Álvarez, Santiago (1989). Los comisarios políticos en el Ejército Popular de la República (in Spanish). Ediciós do Castro.
- Bahamonde Magro, Ángel; Cervera Gil, Javier (1999). Así terminó la Guerra de España (in Spanish). Madrid: Marcial Pons. ISBN 84-95379-00-7.
- Chamorro Martínez, Manuel (1974). 1808/1936: dos situaciones históricas concordantes (in Spanish). Madrid: Imp. Cedesa.
- Edo, Luis Andrés (2006). La CNT en la encrucijada. Aventuras de un heterodoxo (in Spanish). Flor del Viento Ediciones.
- Engel, Carlos (1999). Historia de las Brigadas Mixtas del Ejército Popular de la República (in Spanish). Madrid: Almena. ISBN 84-922644-7-0.
- Gabriel, Pere (2011). Historia de la UGT IV. Un sindicalismo en guerra (1936-1939) (in Spanish). Siglo XXI de España Editores.
- Mainar, Eladi (1998). De milicians a soldats. Les columnes valencianes en la Guerra Civil Espanyola (1936-1939) (in Spanish). Universidad de Valencia. ISBN 84-370-3349-7.
- Maldonado, José M.ª (2007). El frente de Aragón. La Guerra Civil en Aragón (1936–1938) (in Spanish). Mira Editores. ISBN 978-84-8465-237-3.
- Martínez Bande, José Manuel (1977). La ofensiva sobre Valencia (in Spanish). Madrid: San Martín. ISBN 84-7140-142-8.
- Martínez Bande, José Manuel (1981). La batalla de Pozoblanco y el cierre de la bolsa de Mérida (in Spanish). Madrid: Editorial San Martín.
- Martínez Bande, José Manuel (1985). El final de la Guerra Civil (in Spanish). Madrid: San Martín. ISBN 84-7140-232-7.
- Navarro, Francisco Javier (2004). A la revolución por la cultura (in Spanish). Universidad de Valencia. ISBN 84-370-5866-X.
