= José Pellicer =

José Pellicer may refer to:

- José Pellicer de Ossau Salas y Tovar (1602–1679), Spanish historian, philologist, genealogist and poet
- José Pellicer Gandía (1912–1942), Valencian anarchist revolutionary
