= Iberia Column =

Anarchist militia column during the Spanish Civil War

- Columna Iberia
- Active: September 1936–February 1937
- Country: Spain
- Allegiance: Confederación Nacional del Trabajo
- Branch: Confederal militias
- Type: Militia column
- Part of: Eixea-Uribes Column; Torres-Benedito Column
- Colours: Red; Black
- Engagements: Spanish Civil War: Teruel front

The Iberia Column (Spanish: Columna Iberia) was a column of the confederal militias that fought in the Spanish Civil War. It was formed in Alacant and posted on the front lines in the province of Teruel. It joined the Torres-Benedito Column, within which it supported the militarisation of the militias and was integrated into the 81st Mixed Brigade of the Spanish Republican Army.

== Formation ==
The Iberia Column was established in September 1936, made up of Valencian members of the Iberian Anarchist Federation (FAI) and members of the Confederación Nacional del Trabajo from Alacant. It was organised into centurias that acted under the direction of a war committee, which included anarchists such as Vicente Sanchís, Modesto Mameli and José Padilla. It had its own supply and healthcare services, as well as a field hospital with 72 beds for the wounded.

== Teruel front ==
The column marched to the Teruel front, where it remained throughout its existence. There it was integrated into the Eixea-Uribes Column, itself composed of militants of the Unified Socialist Youth. It soon left that column and joined the Torres-Benedito Column, led by Jesús Velasco Echave. It did not participate in the Republican offensive on Teruel in December 1936.

== Militarisation ==
Following the failed attack on Teruel, in February 1937, a delegate from the Iberia Column attended a plenum of the confederal militias, where they discussed the proposal for the militarisation of the militias. Their delegate announced that the Column would submit to a single command and military discipline, and promised to shoot any deserters, but refused to accept the authority of officers that commanded from the rear guard. The Iberia Column delegate also called for the militias themselves to conscript any apolitical people who remained inactive in Republican territory. In the spring of 1937 the column was militarised without opposition from its members. Together with the Torres-Benedito Column, it was integrated into the 81st Mixed Brigade, which formed part of the 41st Division.

== See also ==
- Anarchism in Spain

== Bibliography ==
- Casanova Nuez, Esther (2007). La violencia política en la retaguardia republicana de Teruel durante la guerra civil [Political violence in the republican rearguard of Teruel during the civil war] (in Spanish). Instituto de Estudios Turolenses. ISBN 9788496053243. OCLC 259743412.
- Gabriel, Pere (2011). Historia de la UGT [History of UGT IV. A trade union at war (1936-1939)] (in Spanish). Vol. 4. Siglo XXI de España Editores. ISBN 978-84-323-1385-1. OCLC 734080749.
- Mainar, Eladi (1998). De milicians a soldats. Les columnes valencianes en la Guerra Civil Espanyola (1936-1939) [From militiamen to soldiers. The Valencian columns in the Spanish Civil War (1936-1939)]. University of Valencia. ISBN 84-370-3349-7. OCLC 807418996.
- Paz, Abel (2011). The Story of the Iron Column: Militant Anarchism in the Spanish Civil War. AK Press. ISBN 978-1-84935-064-8.
