= Iron Column =

- Columna de Ferro
- Flag used by the Rakosi Battalion, a group of Hungarian volunteers originally integrated into the Iron Column.
- Active: August 1936 – March 1937
- Disbanded: 1 April 1937
- Countries: Spanish Republic; Valencia
- Allegiance: CNT-FAI
- Branch: Confederal militias
- Type: Militia
- Size: 20,000
- Garrison/HQ: Valencia
- Engagements: Spanish Civil War: Teruel front

Commanders
- Notable commanders: José Pellicer Gandía

Propaganda Poster that reads: "Iron Column; For a Free Humanity! For Anarchy!"

The Iron Column (Catalan: Columna de Ferro, Spanish: Columna de Hierro) was a Valencian anarchist militia column formed during the Spanish Civil War to fight against the military forces of the Nationalist Faction that had rebelled against the Second Spanish Republic.

== History ==
The Iron Column was formed in Valencia at the start of the Spanish Revolution by local anarchists including Rafael Martí (nicknamed 'Pancho Villa' after the Mexican revolutionary), José and Pedro Pellicer, Elias Manzanera and José Segarra. The Iron Column fought on the Teruel front.

=== Aragon front ===
On 8 August, 8 centuries (800 militiamen) left Valencia for Teruel. They did it in two batches and in a disorganized way. First, the Alcoy group led by Rafael Martí, which left Valencia with some 150 militiamen, passed through Sagunto, where they were joined by another hundred volunteers. Upon reaching the Teruel town of Sarrión, when they were about 400 strong, they halted a nationalist attack. At the same time, another militia under the command of José Pellicer Gandía with 400 other volunteers left Valencia. In these early days the column almost totally lacked organization, until after several casualties caused by disorganization in combat they decide to form the centuries. Towards the end of August, the column stabilized at the front and had about 1,600 militiamen who were fighting together with 600 regular soldiers, totaling 2,200. The Iron column was around 12,000 strong in October (and up to 20,000 by the winter), although only 3,000 could be armed, mainly with small arms taken in the assault on the Albereda barracks. The rest of the volunteers were either at the Las Salesas Barracks or at home waiting to be summoned.

The Iron Column stood for defense (and extension) of the popular revolution rather than defense of the Republic. Among its earliest acts were the freeing of convicts from the San Miguel de los Reyes prison and the burning of judicial archives. Many of these released convicts joined the Iron Column upon being released from jail. However, the actions of some of these hardened convicts, many of whom had joined only for personal gain, soon gave the Iron column a notorious reputation. Because the fact that the Iron Column vocally opposed the CNT-FAI (the leading Anarchist organization on the Republican side) entrance into the national government, the CNT refused to arm and supply the column, and thus it was forced to rely on confiscations and the aid of regional committees. The Iron Column also found itself embroiled in factional fighting with Communist units and the assault guards. In the town of Benaguasil they had an armed confrontation against the communists who controlled the town. After a confrontation with several deaths on both sides, the government sent planes to attack the anarchist column.

=== Controversy ===
The column was attacked for wanting to impose libertarian communism wherever its militias were. The militias that were inactive at the front dedicated themselves to extending the agricultural collectives in Teruel. Collectivism was also pushed by other columns such as the Torres-Benedito Column, which also defended the collectives. But more than any other, not even the Durruti Column, the Iron Column acted both as a war militia and as a revolutionary organization: it took minutes of its assemblies, published a newspaper ("Line of Fire") and distributed manifestos, because it needed to explain its actions in the rear and justify its movements and decisions before the workers and peasants. It came to be considered a community in itself.

In September and October, due to the lack of arms and ammunition, hundreds of columns were sent to the rear in search of them. When they got to the rear, they were harassed by law enforcement who tried to arrest and search them. Faced with this provocation, the column responded with force: so on two occasions, one in Valencia and another in Castellón, the revolutionaries stormed the courts to destroy judicial records, the City Council to destroy property records, and even attacked the San Miguel de los Reyes prison where they released the prisoners held there. This was due to Pellicer's initiative against prisons, wherever they were, which incidentally complied with one of the agreements of the CNT of the Zaragoza Congress. In Castellón some 65 rightist and fascist prisoners were shot by the column. They also executed 16 others after a removal of prisoners without accusation or trial in Vinaroz. Also in the search for weapons, rifles and machine guns were seized from the Popular Antifascist Guard (GPA), which were keeping them far in the rear. On 2 October 1936, militiamen from the Column evacuated the prisoners in the hold of the Legazpi ship and executed them at the Paterna Picadero.

=== Militarization ===
When, in November 1936, the Government was evacuated to Valencia due to the proximity of nationalist troops to Madrid, several ministers were arrested, humiliated and threatened with death as they passed through Tarancón, a town controlled by the column. By the end of the year Valencia had become a refuge for republican officials and rulers. In mid-December the columns were summoned for an attack on Teruel, the Iron Column was to attack Puerto Escandón. But the battle was fruitless, since the Republicans did not support the artillery attack and their planes did not know how to take advantage of their superiority, nor did they activate any contiguous front so that the enemy would not send reinforcements.

The Iron Column resisted the government plan of turning the popular militias into regular army units longer than any other group. Reasons for this resistance can be read in an essay titled "A Day Mournful and Overcast", written by a member of the Iron Column. A delegate of the Iron Column said at a CNT congress:

"There are some comrades who believe that militarization settles everything, but we maintain that it settles nothing. As against corporals, sergeants, and officers, graduated from the academies, and completely useless in matters of war, we have our own organization, and we do not accept a military structure."

Delegates more favorable to militarization were sent from other fronts to try to convince the militiamen. Mariano Vázquez and Juan García Oliver also tried to mediate the matter, although they were ignored. The column, along with others with the same opinion, convened a plenary session of anarchist columns to discuss militarization. After the plenary session, it was seen that it was inevitable. Almost all the anarchist militias agreed to militarize. During a month there were many debates within the column that were causing voluntary losses and expulsions. But finally the column decided to militarize itself. To do so it needed to be relieved.

It came down from the front in the second week of March 1937 and was militarized on 1 April, becoming the 83rd Mixed Brigade (with many members who had previously been delegates becoming officers). Many members of the column also joined other mixed units, such as the 82nd Mixed Brigade and the 84th Mixed Brigade.

An unknown member of the Iron Column wrote the Protesta ante los libertarios del presente y del futuro sobre las capitulaciones de 1937 (Protest in front of the present and future libertarians about the surrenders of 1937) where the author denounces the militarization and the compromises by the CNT leadership at the time.

== See also ==
- Anarchism in Spain
- María Pérez Lacruz
- Spanish Civil War

== Bibliography ==
- Bolloten, Burnett (1961). The Grand Camouflage: the Communist Conspiracy in the Spanish Civil War. New York: Praeger. OCLC 582727346.
- Bolloten, Burnett (1979). The Spanish revolution: the left and the struggle for power during the civil war. University of North Carolina Press. ISBN 0-8078-4077-7.
- Bolloten, Burnett (1991). The Spanish Civil War: Revolution and Counterrevolution. UNC Press Books. ISBN 978-0-8078-1906-7.
- Araceli, Gabriel; Garcia Albors, Enrique. Valencia 1936 (in Spanish). El Noticiero.
- Girona, Manuel (2007). Una miliciana en la Columna de Hierro: María "la Jabalina" (in Spanish). Universitat de València. ISBN 978-8437066561.
- Mainar Cabanes, Eladi (1998). De milicians a soldats: les columnes valencianes en la Guerra Civil espanyola, 1936-1937 (in Catalan). Universitat de València. ISBN 8437033497.
- Manzanera, Elías (2006). Iron Column, The: Testimony of an Anarchist. Kate Sharpley Library. ISBN 1-873605-19-6.
- Paz, Abel (2011). The Story of the Iron Column: Militant Anarchism in the Spanish Civil War. AK Press and Kate Sharpley Library. ISBN 978-1-84935-064-8.
- Vidarte, Juan-Simeón (1973). Todos fuimos culpables (in Spanish). Fondo de Cultura Económica.
