= Sacco and Vanzetti Battalion =

- Sacco eta Vanzetti Batailoia
- Active: September 1936 – October 1937
- Country: Euskadi
- Allegiance: CNT-FAI
- Branch: Confederal militias, Euzko Gudarostea
- Type: Infantry
- Size: Battalion
- Engagements: Spanish Civil War: Northern Front

Commanders
- Notable commanders: Juan Rivera

The Sacco and Vanzetti Battalion (Basque: Sacco eta Vanzetti Batailoia; Spanish: Batallón Sacco y Vanzetti) was a military unit of the National Confederation of Labor (CNT) from Euskadi that acted on the Northern Front during the Spanish Civil War. It was No. 4 of the CNT Militias and No. 12 of Euzko Gudarostea.

== See also ==
- Anarchism in Spain
- Sacco and Vanzetti
