= Confederal militias =

Militia formed during the Spanish Civil War

Confederal Militia
- Milicias confederales de la CNT-FAI
- Red and black flag of the CNT-FAI
- Active: 1934–1937
- Disbanded: 1937
- Country: Spanish Republic
- Allegiance: CNT-FAI
- Branch: Spanish Republican Army
- Type: People's Militia
- Role: Home defense
- Size: 50,000
- Colors: Red and Black
- Engagements: Revolution of 1934; Spanish Civil War

Commanders
- Durruti Column: Buenaventura Durruti
- South Ebro Column: Antonio Ortiz Ramírez
- Ascaso Column: Cristóbal Alvaldetrecu, Gregorio Jover, Domingo Ascaso
- Harriers Column: Miguel García Vivancos, Juan García Oliver
- Iron Column: José Pellicer Gandía
- Land and Freedom Column: Germinal de Souza
- Rosal Column: Francisco del Rosal Rico, Cipriano Mera

The confederal militias were a movement of people's militia during the Spanish Civil War organized by the Spanish anarchist movement: the National Confederation of Labor (CNT) and the Iberian Anarchist Federation (FAI). The CNT militias replaced clandestine defense committees instituted earlier. As the war progressed, the militias were progressively dissolved and assimilated into the Spanish Republican Army, in spite of many militiamen refusing the militarization.

== The CNT Defense Committees ==
The origin of the CNT militias in the Spanish Civil War is in the Defense Committees, clandestine military organizations of the CNT that were financed by and subordinate to the unions. The essential functions of the defense committees were twofold: arms and administration. These committees were a reorganization and expansion of different affinity groups, such as Los Solidarios, who fought against the bosses' pistolerismo between 1917 and 1923.

In 1934, other factions began to organize their own clandestine militias. The Communist Party formed the Antifascist Worker and Peasant Militias. The Carlists formed the Frente Nacional de Boinas Rojas, in an attempt to create a hierarchical national Requeté structure, detached from local Carlist juntas. The newly founded Falange Española de las JONS also formed their own militia, the Primera Línea.

In October 1934, the CNT Defense Committees abandoned the old affinity group tactic in favor of serious and methodical revolutionary preparation:

There can be no revolution without preparation. We have to put an end to the prejudice in favor of improvisation. This error, involving confidence in the creative instinct of the masses, has caused us to pay a heavy price. We cannot obtain by means of a process of spontaneous generation the indispensable means necessary for waging war on a State that has experience, heavy weaponry, and a greater capacity for offensive and defensive combat.

The basic defense group had to be small in order to facilitate its secrecy. It had to be made up of six militants, with very specific functions:

- Secretary, in charge of contacting other cadres, creating new groups and preparing reports.
- Personal Investigator, in charge of assessing the danger posed by enemies, such as priests, the military, and pistoleros.
- Building Investigator, in charge of drafting up blueprints and the preparation of statistical reports.
- Researcher, in charge of determining strategic points and tactics for street fighting.
- Researcher, in charge of studying public services: electricity, water, gas, sewerage.
- Investigator, in charge of determining where to obtain arms, money and supplies.

To that ideal figure of six, one more member could be added to cover “high-profile” tasks. The clandestinity of the group had to be absolute. They were the basic nucleus of a revolutionary armed force, capable of mobilizing larger secondary groups, and these, in turn, the entire people.

The scope of action of each defense group was a very precise demarcation within each neighborhood, indicated on a map. The neighborhood defense committee coordinated all these defense cadres, and received a monthly report from each of the group secretaries. The defense committees were also organized at the regional and national level, due to the importance of communications and coordination in a revolutionary insurrection.

The Defense Committees were replaced, in August 1936, by the Control Patrols acting under the command of the Central Committee of Antifascist Militias of Catalonia. However, the defense committees were reactivated during the Barcelona May Days, when the Spanish Republic clashed with the CNT-FAI and POUM, in a dispute over the control of Revolutionary Catalonia.

Volunteers in these militias declined to wear uniforms, give the military echelon a salute, and perform other formal military duties. The officers, elected, could quickly succeed one another at the head of a group and the men felt they had the right to discuss the orders and only apply them if they were in agreement.

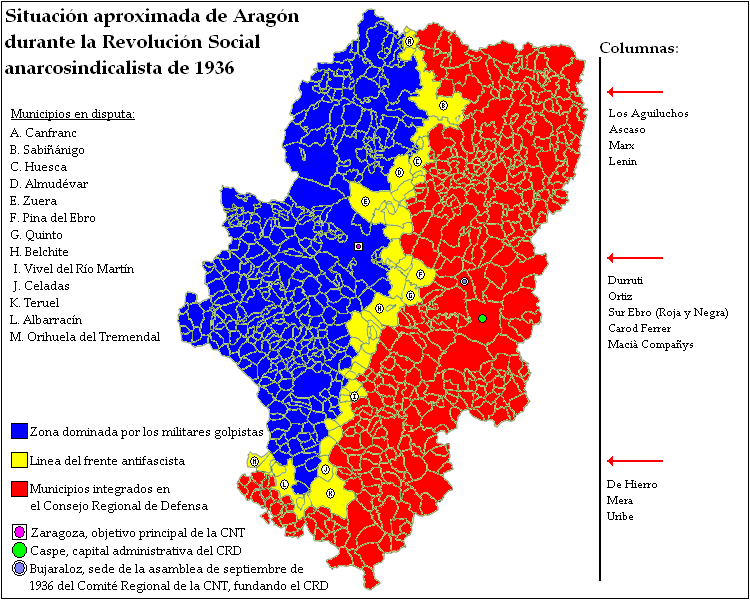
The Aragon front in 1936

== The columns ==
The Castilian guerrillas of the War of Spanish Succession (1701–1715) and the guerrilla war on the Portuguese-Extremadura border between 1641 and 1668 were able be early examples of the use of columns in armed conflict. During the Spanish War of Independence columns were formed as conglomerates grouping together various regular military or civilian forces and services on a modest scale. The columns, due to their mobility and autonomy, constituted a basic form of organization for the guerrilla war.

One column organized in Valencia at the behest of the republic's Delegated Government Board, at that moment in a power dispute with the UGT-CNT's Popular Executive Committee, which had governed Valencia in the days after the uprising. The board ignored the warnings of the UGT and CNT and sent a column of about 500 civil guards and about 200 volunteer militiamen to Teruel. When they neared the city, the civil guard executed the militiamen and defected to the Nationalists, establishing a military base in Teruel during the first days of the war.

- The "group" of twenty-five people was the simplest combat unit. The soldiers themselves chose a delegate, dismissable at any time, responsible for representing them.
- The “century” was composed of four groups, that is to say one hundred people, with a century delegate;
- The "grouping" was composed of five centuries, that is to say five hundred people, and had its own elected delegate;
- The "column" was the sum of the existing groupings. A general delegate of each column was elected.

Columns also consisted of internationalist autonomous groups, as well as guerrilla groups that were on missions behind enemy lines. These combat units were flexible, being able to vary the number of militiamen framed within them and the number of smaller units that make them up.

A war committee advised by a military-technical council coordinated the column's operations. At the head of the war committee was the general delegate of the column. All the delegates of all ranks lacked privileges and hierarchical command.

Famous columns include:

- the Durruti Column
- the Ascaso Column
- the Harriers Column
- the Iron Column
- the Red and Black Column
- the Land and Freedom Column
- the Torres-Benedito Column
- the Iberia Column
- the Maroto Column
- the Andalusia-Extremadura Column
- the Rosal Column
- the South Ebro Column
  - Brigade of Death

== The CNT battalions ==
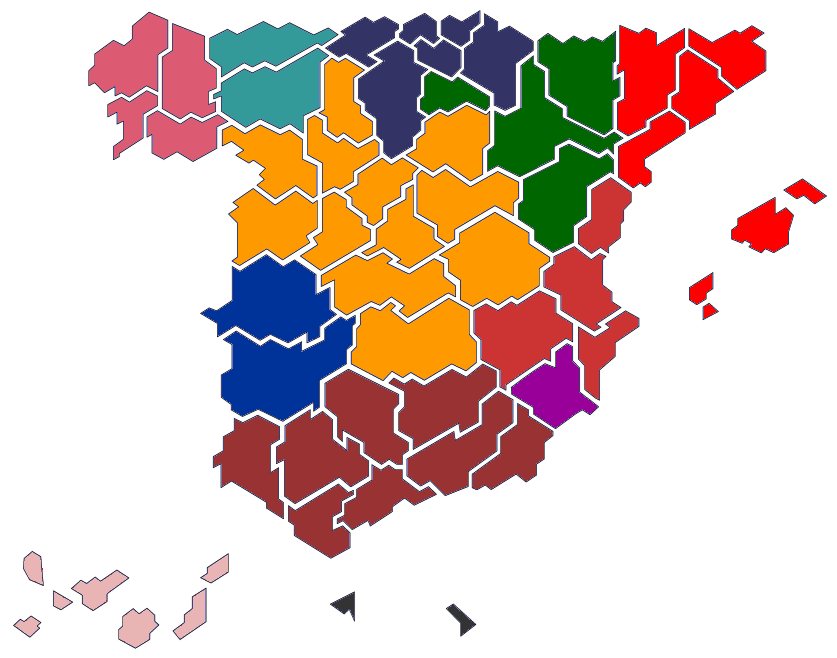
Regional map of the CNT: Andalusia Aragon-La Rioja Asturias-León Canary Islands Catalonia-Balearics Central / Extremadura Galicia Levante Murcia North

=== Central Fronts ===
In other areas the form of organization of the militias took that of the battalions. Among the Madrid columns there were several battalions such as the "Free Spain", "Águilas de la Libertad", "Spartacus", "Mora", "Ferrer", "Orobón Fernández", "Juvenil Libertario", "Sigüenza" and "Toledo" battalions, which were fighting in both locations. In addition individual cenetistas would often integrate other republican columns, such as the Mangada Column which had numerous cenetistas. The CNT of the Center even organized up to 23,000 militiamen in December 1936, rivaling the numbers of the Fifth Regiment.

The Asturian militias had around 10,000 militiamen in September. About a third, anarchists. However, when the fifths were recruited and the battalions were created, the CNT was assigned much fewer commanders than was proportional to their numbers. Many times out of rejection of militarism, libertarians renounced taking control of battalions, giving way to the imposition of republican or communist commanders on them.

In Euskadi the CNT was a minority force. But just as had happened in Madrid they saw a spectacular growth as a result of the war. Despite having less than 3,000 members in May 1936, in a few months it has 35,000 members and at the end of 1936 it mobilized around 6,000 militiamen. Its battalions included the Isaac Puente Battalion and the Sacco-Vanzetti Battalion.

In Santander the CNT forces were initially a part of the mixed battalions. However, some CNT battalions were also formed, such as the "Liberty Battalion" and the "CNT-FAI Battalion." Most of the anarchists in the city, curiously, were affiliated to the UGT unions.

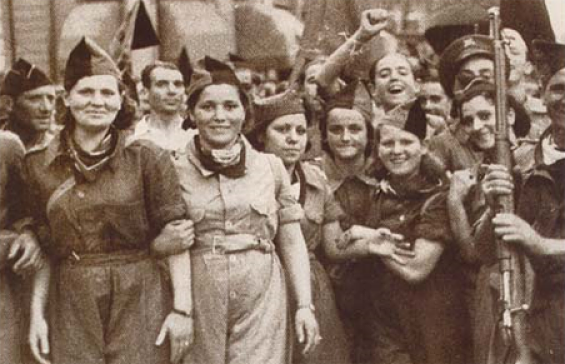
Milicianas of the CNT-FAI in Barcelona, July 1936.

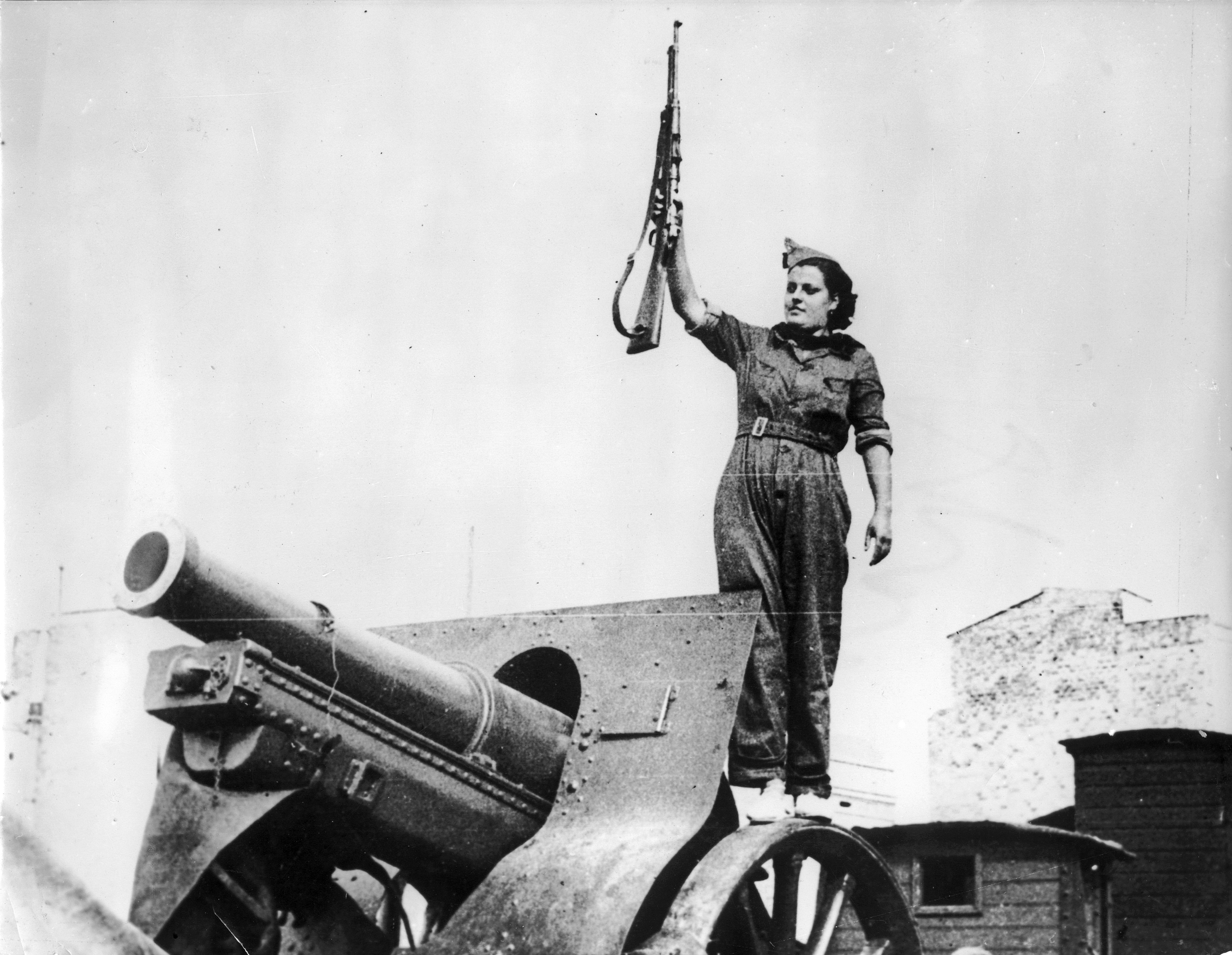
Woman with a rifle near a cannon, Barcelona, 1936.

== The "tiznaos" ==
Due to the shortage of combat means and materials, heavy vehicles such as trucks, buses or agricultural machinery were reinforced with steel plates of different thicknesses. They began to be informally known as "tiznaos" for their disparate colored camouflage. The armor of these makeshift armored vehicles was not usually very effective because the steel plates were unevenly attached, or not thick enough, to the extent that on some occasions the "tiznaos" included mattresses as a protection measure. It also happened that sometimes, when wanting to install vehicles with thicker plates to increase protection, the maneuverability and speed of the vehicle were impaired. Due to deficiencies in armor or handling, the more improvised "tiznaos" were quickly put out of action. Those that had been built with more care and with better technical means lasted longer, some of them surviving the three years of the war.

== Militarization of militias ==
The assembly organization of the militias had numerous problems, since lack of discipline was frequent, as well as riots and desertions. In the toughest battles, where the nationalist armies proved to possess more and better means, routing was not uncommon. Situations like this forced military leaders to be vigilant of their soldiers, having in many cases to take the lead in the attacks if they wanted to be followed, so many of the most capable characters fell in the front.

According to a report of the "Peninsular Committee of the FAI" of 30 September 1938 – quoted by José Peirats – the percentage of anarchists and confederalists in the Republican Army was 33% (about 150,000 soldiers of about 450,000 soldiers republicans). The 5th, 16th, 20th, 24th, 25th, 26th, 28th, 54th, 63rd, 70th, 71st and 77th divisions had anarchist commanders. Anarchists also had command of 2 army corps. Despite appearing to be important figures, in reality there was a clear under-representation of anarchists in the republican army.

The militias helped and promoted the formation of communes in the towns through which they passed. In Aragón 450 agricultural communes made up of 423,000 people, were formed and integrated into the Council of Aragon. These communes were a source of support in the rear for the militias, in addition to probably representing the closest approach to the ideal of anarchist life that had been fought for in Spain since the First Spanish Republic.

== See also ==
- Mujeres Libres

== Bibliography ==
- The "Uncontrollable" Iron Column, March 1937, bilingual Spanish / French edition, editions Champ Libre, Paris, 1979. La Columna de Hierro y la Revolución
- Miquel Amorós, José Pellicer Gandía, the upright anarchist. Life and work of the founder of the Heroic Iron Column , Editorial virus, Barcelona, 2009. ISBN 978-84-92559-02-2
- Miquel Amorós, The revolution betrayed. The true story of Balius and Los Amigos de Durruti , Editorial virus, Barcelona, 2003. ISBN 84-96044-15-7
- Burnett Bolloten, "The Great Deception: The Left and its struggle for power in the Republican zone."
- Abel Paz, Durruti in the Spanish Revolution , AK Press, 2006. ISBN 978-1-904859-50-5. Translated by Chuck W. Morse.
- Abel Paz, The Story of the Iron Column: Militant Anarchism in the Spanish Civil War. AK Press and Kate Sharpley Library, 2011. ISBN 978-1-84935-064-8. Translated by Paul Sharkey.
- Carlos Semprún Maura (1978). Revolution and counterrevolution in Catalonia. Barcelona: Tusquets.
- Hans Magnus Enzensberger, The short summer of anarchy. Durruti's life and death , Barcelona, Anagrama, 1998.
- Antoine Giménez and the Gymnologists, "Of love, war and revolution" followed by "In search of the children of the night", Logroño, Pumpkin seeds, 2009.
- Agustín Guillamón, The CNT Defense Committees (1933–1938) , Barcelona, Aldarull Edicions, 2011. ISBN 978-84-938538-4-6
- José Peirats, The CNT in the Spanish Revolution , Toulouse, 1952.
