= Popular Executive Committee of Valencia =

Autonomous entity of Spain from 1936 to 1937

Popular Executive Committee of Valencia Comitè Executiu Popular de València
- Autonomous entity of Spain
- 1936–1937
- Flag Coat of arms

- Capital: Valencia
- Demonym: Valencian valencià, -ana (va) valenciano, -na (es)
- Government
  - Type: Council republic
- President
  - 22 July - October 1936: Ernesto Arín Prado
  - October 1936 - 8 January 1937: Ricardo Zabaltza Elorga
- Legislature: Generalitat Valenciana
- Historical era: Spanish Civil War
  - Established: 22 July 1936
  - Disestablished: 8 January 1937
  - Nationalist occupation of Valencia: 30 March 1939
Preceded by	Succeeded by
Second Spanish Republic	Second Spanish Republic
- Today part of: Spain ∟Valencia

The Popular Executive Committee of Valencia was a revolutionary autonomous entity created on 22 July 1936, to confront the Spanish coup of July 1936 which started the Spanish Civil War. It was made up of the political forces of the Popular Front and the trade union forces of the National Confederation of Labor (Spanish: Confederación Nacional del Trabajo, CNT) and General Union of Workers (Unión General de Trabajadores, UGT). Based in Valencia, it covered most of Valencia province and part of Castellón and Alicante.

== History ==
=== Background ===
A few weeks before the attempted coup, on 11 July, a group of Falangists stormed the station of Unión Radio Valencia, announcing through their microphones an imminent "national syndicalist revolution". The person designated by Emilio Mola to lead the uprising in Valencia was Manuel González Carrasco, who arrived there from Madrid a day before the date indicated for the uprising. But when the moment came, González Carrasco, who had to change his address to avoid being detained by the police, had doubts and backed down. He proclaimed his loyalty to the government and pledged not to form the contingent of fighters he had promised to the military.

In the early hours of the morning, an important labor mobilization was taking place in the city (the CNT and UGT had called for a General Strike as of 19 July) accompanied by the deployment of the Assault Guard, and the officers loyal to the republican government. The officers of the Spanish Military Union were confronted by the pro-republican officers of the UMRA, in a decisive action. Martínez Monje ordered the execution of the nationalist troops while awaiting news from Madrid or Barcelona. The news of the military's surrender in Barcelona at the end of the day was decisive for the nationalist impulse to be deactivated. The next day, Monday, 20 July, the UGT and CNT mobilized and created the Confederal militias of the Levante to control the nerve centers of the city and the surroundings of the barracks in anticipation of a possible escalation; the Strike Committees were unified under the leadership of Francisco Gómez (CNT) and Guillén (UGT) in the Unified Revolutionary Committee (or Unified Strike Committee). To counter the nascent alternative workers power of the Unified Revolutionary Committee on the street, the government of José Giral sent Diego Martínez Barrio to Valencia at the head of a Delegate Board of the Levantine Government, whose main mission was to reestablish the authority of the republican government in the region.

=== Establishment ===
Two days later, on Wednesday 22 July 1936, the Unified Revolutionary Committee formed the self-proclaimed Popular Executive Committee (Spanish: Comité Ejecutivo Popular, CEP), made up of the two main trade unions the UGT and CNT, as well as the Popular Front parties, which seized power without formally dismissing the republican authorities. The socialists and anarchists, for their part, maintained the Unified Revolutionary Committee in parallel to deal with the supply shortages that were beginning to be suffered in Valencia. At the same time, they ceded the leadership of the military struggle to the CEP, which commissioned the training of militias. Meanwhile, the military officers Gonzalez Carrasco and Barba Hernández fled Valencia in secret. On the other hand, when on Thursday, 23 July, the Delegate Board announced the dissolution of the CEP (constituted the previous day). The CEP refused and, in the face of the attempted uprising of the Paternal headquarters, close to the city, they launched the Levantine militias against the barracks, which were forcibly taken between the end of July and the beginning of August. On 5 August, the Delegate Board, in the face of the failure of its management, officially recognized the Popular Executive Committee, which went on to direct all rearguard policy in Valencia, and left the city. Around the same time, some militias left Valencia to participate in the Battle of Mallorca.

The CEP was initially chaired by Ernesto Arín, who until then had been head of Recruitment and Mobilization. After its recognition by the republican government on 5 August, the Committee presidency was installed in the Palace of the Generalitat Valenciana. The CEP was made up of twelve delegates: two from the CNT, two from the UGT, one from PSOE, one from the PCE, one from the POUM, one from the Syndicalist Party, one from the Republican Left, one from the Republican Union, one from Valencian Left and one from the Partit Valencianista d'Esquerra.

=== Development ===
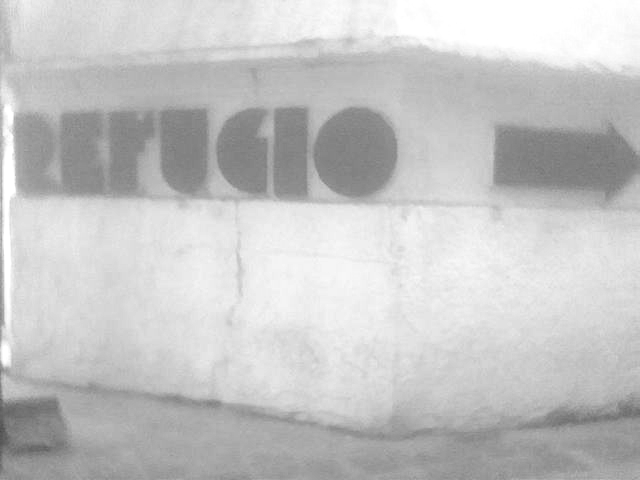
Signposting for the entrance to an air raid shelter in Valencia.

During the first months of activity of this administration, 13% of cultivated land was seized and collectivized, forming 353 collectives, 264 directed by the CNT, 69 by the UGT, and 20 mixed CNT-UGT. Some of the CEP representatives at the time were Francisco Bosch Morata, delegate for Health and Social Assistance, José Antonio Uribes, head of the CEP Militia Delegation, Manuel Pérez Feliu, and José Benedito Lleó, the delegate for War.

On 16 September, the Popular Anti-fascist Guard (Spanish: Guardia Popular Antifascista GPA) was created to take charge of public order. It would come to replace the Assault Guard in the city. It was made up of sections, each made up of 14 people from anti-fascist parties and unions. Every 4 sections was commanded by a military man. The GPA as a whole was commanded by the secretary of Public Order of the CEP, the socialist Gonzalo Navacerrada.

In September the revolutionaries of the Iron Column assaulted the courts to destroy the judicial records, the City Council destroyed the property records and assaulted the Monastery of San Miguel de los Reyes where they released the prisoners that were held there. Also in search of weapons, the GPA guards, who had rifles and machine guns, were being disarmed and becoming police officers.

At the end of October 1936, the CEP presidency passed into the hands of Ricardo Zabaltza Elorga, who was also appointed Civil Governor of Valencia by Largo Caballero.

==== Unified Levantine Council for Agricultural Export (CLUEA) ====
One of the CEP's main developments was the Unified Levantine Council for Agricultural Export (Spanish: Consejo Levantino Unificado de Exportación Agrícola, CLUEA), created on 7 October 1936, by representatives of the Valencian CNT and UGT. It was an organization dedicated to managing orange exports to other European countries. Posterists like Arturo Ballester and the monthly magazine La voz del CLUEA were available to spread the organization's activities.

Oranges were one of the main Valencian export products. In the context of the civil war, the orange market was a very important income from foreign exchange, for those who managed to control it. For this reason, the central government was not in favor of collectivization, since it meant leaving a large number of currencies in the hands of the unions, but rather favored following the usual path of an export controlled by individual companies, coordinated only by international markets. Thus, the Republican parties, the Government, and the Communist Party defended the maintenance of freedom of export under certain government control. In contrast, the UGT and CNT were in favor of collectivizing all exports, in order to avoid the flight of foreign currency.

CLUEA's management was always surrounded by controversy and confrontation, since although the UGT militants agreed with the collectivization, the leaders of the PSOE did not. Among the leaders opposed to collectivization was Largo Caballero himself. In that year, an overproduction crisis occurred in the European market. The European market was saturated with Palestinian oranges, Spanish production had extra competition. Overall, it appeared that the citrus campaign contributed between half and two thirds the amount of the previous foreign exchange campaign. This foreign exchange would be about 200 million pesetas for about 700,000 tons of exported oranges.

This decrease in income caused harsh attacks from its detractors, the government prevailed and decided to dissolve the CLUEA. It was replaced by the Citrus Export Commission, under the Ministry of Economy. The commission was created by decree of the Government of Juan Negrín on 6 September 1937. Its objective was to control orange exports in order to obtain foreign currency with which to sustain the war effort. With the end of the war, the company was liquidated by the republican government in exile.

=== The October Events ===
On 29 October 1936, the GPA killed the anarchist Tiburcio Ariza in a raid, after he had refused to be handcuffed. At the funeral organized by the anarchist Torres-Benedito, Iron and CNT 13 columns, they passed near the heavily armed Civilian Government, awaiting a possible attack. When they reached the Plaza de Tetuán, the local headquarters of the Communist Party of Spain, they saw that the communists had organized an armed battalion in the plaza. A young communist protesting against the anarchists' demonstration approached the head of the procession and fired into the crowd. This shot was quickly followed by many others, including machine gun fire, creating chaos in the plaza. The combat lasted half an hour and caused numerous injuries (56 injuries were registered, of which 49 were from the CNT). There were a total of about 30 dead. The CEP issued a proclamation on 1 November calling for the cessation of the brawls.

The immediate reaction was to bring the anarchist forces of Teruel down on Valencia. The communists had that battalion, the GPA, and about 300 young men in military practice. But the CNT committee avoided this situation by rebuking those responsible for the anarchist columns. The last thing the CNT leaders wanted at the time were problems with the PCE, just as the details were being finalized to join the Largo Caballero government.

=== Program ===
On 2 November 1936, shortly before the republican government's move from Madrid to Valencia, Zabaltza approved a series of resolutions that meant a change in the CEP's program of actions, formally subordinating itself to the central government of Largo Caballero, and suggesting the autonomist route as a future solution. Among the numerous resolutions was the formation of an Economic Council within the CEP. Point 14 of the resolutions of 2 November said:

The political and trade union organizations that make up the Popular Executive Committee declare that, along with the other regions of Spain, they consider that the Valencian region should be granted the right to self-determination, founding its own bodies to govern freely, as well as in concert with the other Iberian regions.
Yes, the Republic will be federal, or it will be nothing. All centralism is a fascist concept, and therefore we must oppose the product of that mentality with our feeling of freedom, which is not "disintegrating", but will produce a true union, based on brotherhood and mutual respect.

=== Dissolution ===
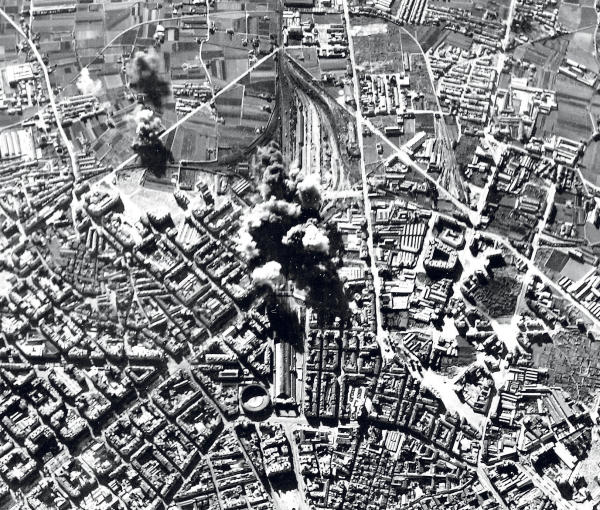
Bombing of the Northern Station of Valencia, carried out by Italian planes in 1937.

On 6 November, the republican government of Largo Caballero moved to Valencia, as tensions between the two administrations are intensifying. In any case, the context was favorable for the approval of a Statute of Autonomy; the CNT presented their "Basis for the Statute of Autonomy of the Valencian Country" in December 1936, while the Valencian Left presented a "Preliminary Draft of the Statute of Autonomy of the Valencian Region" in February 1937 and the Republican Union proposed their own "Draft Statute of Autonomy for the Valencian Country", in March 1937.

In December 1936, the Levantine militias tried to take Teruel, without success. Finally, the CEP voluntarily dissolved itself on 8 January 1937, being relieved by the Valencia Provincial Council. In the words of Franz Borkenau, a contemporary observer of events:

The arrival of the Government has caused reforms; There has been a strengthening of centralism [...] The days in which the Popular Executive Committee ruled the city with total independence from the central Government have passed. The Executive Committee has been officially dissolved, but it continues to exist and collaborate with the Government without there being more disagreements among them than usual. The November crisis was also crucial for Valencia. It brought the government and provoked an armed confrontation between communists and anarchists that ended in the defeat of the latter. But political views lean to the left quite a bit, compared not only with present-day Barcelona, but even with Valencia in August. At the time, the city had been governed by what amounted to almost a Soviet system, although under the guise of the revolutionary regime it had remained wholly petty-bourgeois and anti-revolutionary. Now with the headquarters of the entire socialist and communist organization within its walls, it is tinged with a much more sincere socialism. Expropriations have continued. Most hotels, restaurants, and movie theaters are now either worker-controlled or directly managed by them. The orange industry is controlled by the two unions. There are still workers armed in civilian clothes who watch the streets and make night guards.

The nationalists occupied Castellón de la Plana on 13 June 1938. In the Final offensive of the Spanish Civil War, the nationalist faction occupied Valencia and Alicante on 30 March 1939.

=== The Socialized Economy Regulatory Council (CRES) ===
Subsequently, in Villena, the Socialized Economy Regulatory Council (CRES) was jointly founded by CEP remnants from the UGT and the CNT, in response to the economic and social conditions in place during the Spanish Civil War. It was created on April 22, 1937, in order to socialize the city's economy, after a massive expropriation of industry and agriculture. Its main objectives were to increase production, collaborate in the acquisition of raw materials, distribute and sell manufactured products, and provide financial assistance to workers and families. Its founding act entered the Ministry of Economy and Labor of Alicante on 27 April.

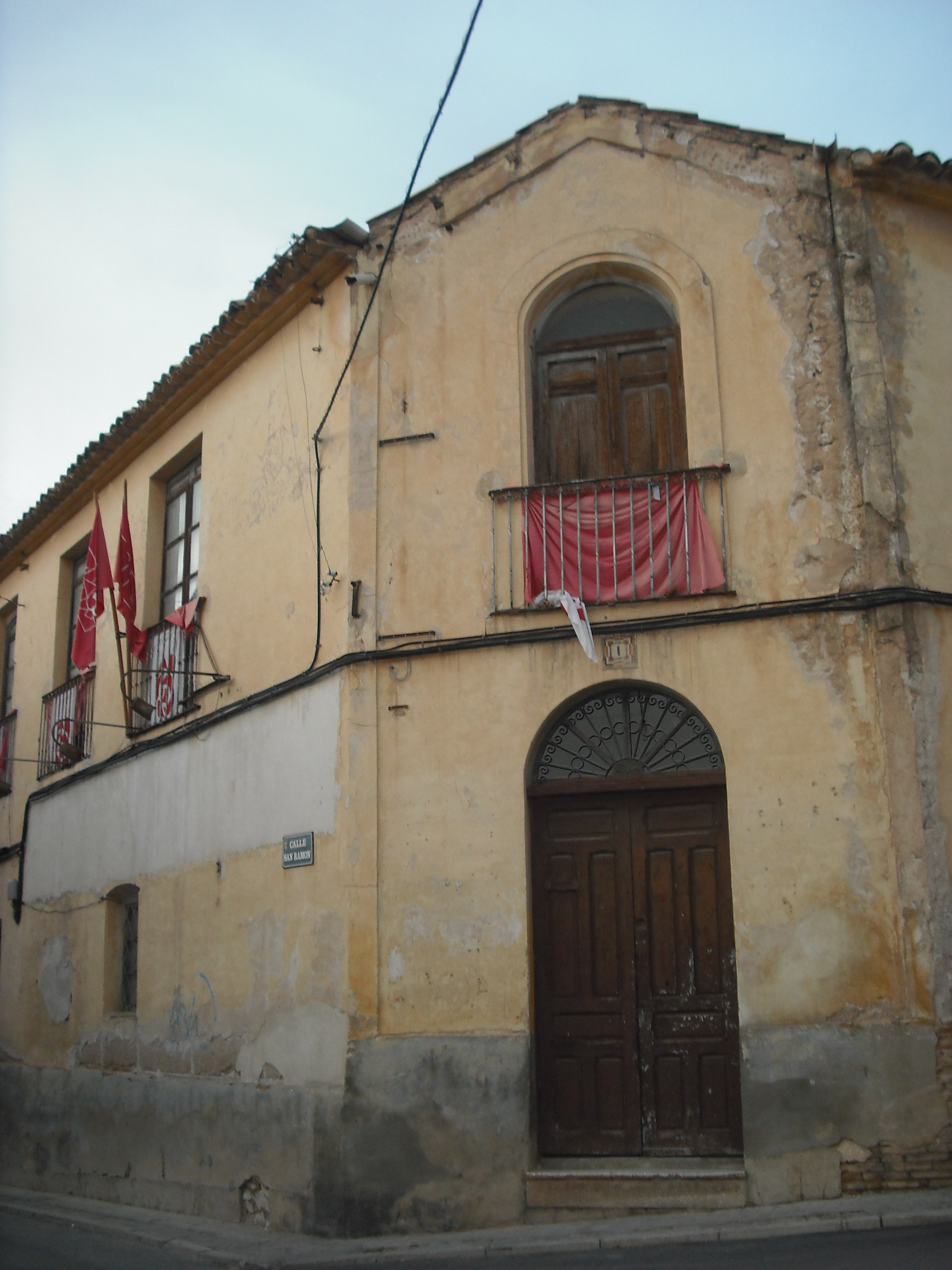
Casa del Pueblo de Villena, meeting place for the CNT and UGT.

The council was formed by all the capital and possessions of the thirteen socialized industrial branches in Villena: Retail, Footwear, Oil, Salt, Wines and Alcohols, Flour, Agriculture, Plaster, Metallurgy, Textiles, Clothing, Furniture and Building Materials. The workshops were mainly in Villena, although there were also some in Yecla, Caudete, Sax and Biar, among others. It was structured by a president, a secretary and a treasurer together with the thirteen directors from each of the thirteen sections. These directors were in turn the chairmen of the Board of Directors of each of the industries, making it easy to check the total daily balance of cash and dedicate it to the industry that needed it the most, or what greatest benefits it could obtain for the good of the general community.

As the year 1937 progressed, the task of obtaining raw materials and selling manufactured products became more difficult. However, the CRES made it possible to reactivate some productive sectors, open new markets, increase production and create numerous jobs, contrary to what happened in other localities where industries were still in private hands. The joint production of the companies that made up the CRES, before 1936, gave a monthly average of 535,000 pesetas, while at the end of 1937 the monthly production was 1,897,000 pesetas on average, with 194.7% more employees than the previous period. The only sectors that did not grow were flour, plaster, construction materials and retail. Due to the increase in the prices of basic necessities and the freezing of wages, the creation of a consumer cooperative was proposed, which was established on 26 August 1937, although it did not open its doors on 3 May 1938. It distributed basic necessities at cost price to the workers of the CRES companies.

In mid-1938 the Textile industry had to close due to a lack of cotton, so some employees were relocated to other industries and the others continued to earn 4 days a week, leading to an administrative crisis, since the other industries were less and less willing to cover the deficit of this one. In the different discussions that took place on various topics, there were constant disputes between the UGT and CNT, which finally resulted in an agreement to divide the workers of the CRES into two groups according to their union.

The war forced more and more managers to join the ranks of the employees, making the state of the Council critical. From January 1939, it was waiting for better economic circumstances that didn't come, since at the end of the war, the Francoist administration was in charge of dissolving the CRES and integrating it into the Vertical Union.

== Composition ==
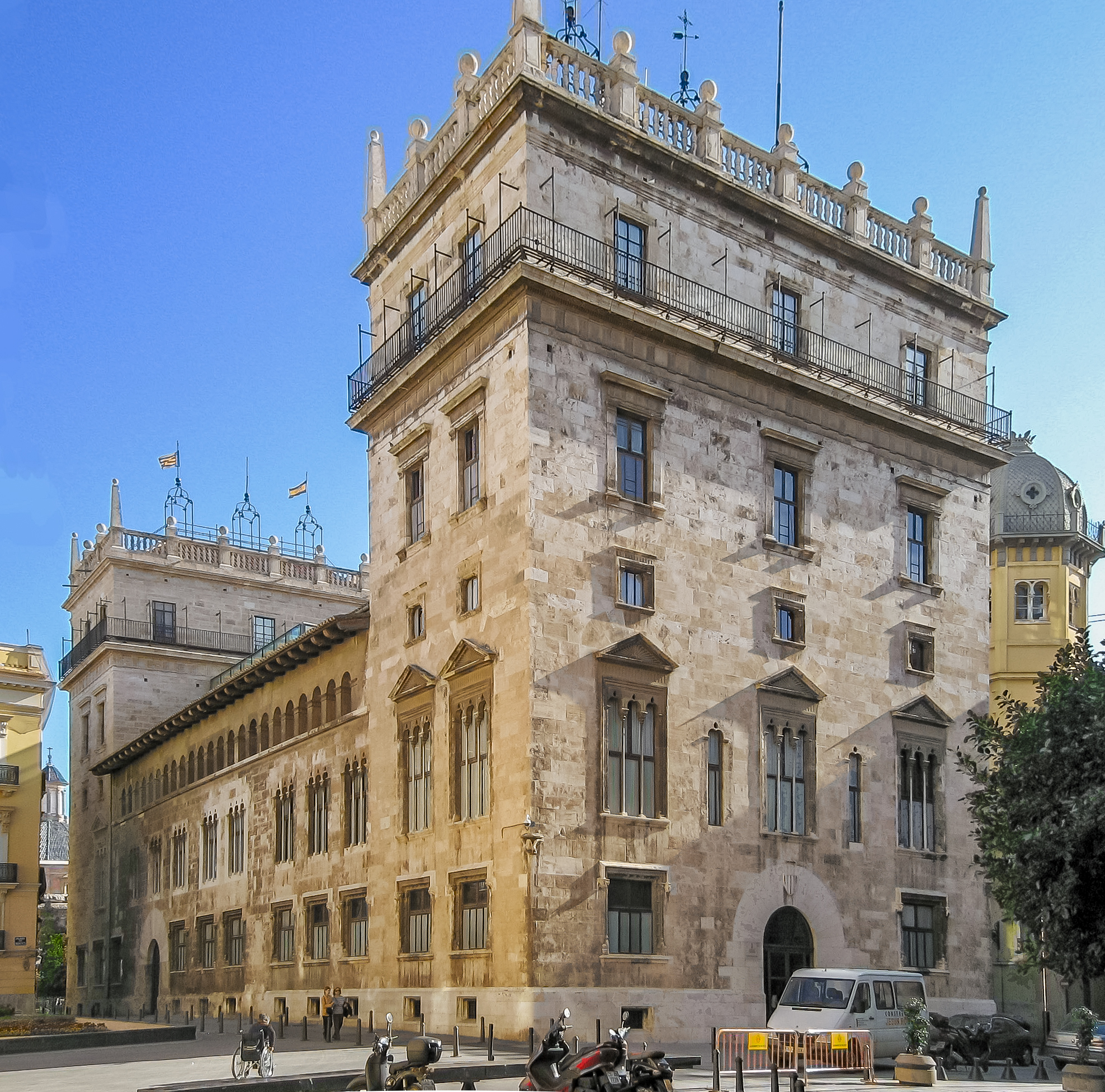
Palace of the Generalitat Valenciana, the seat of the committee's presidency over the Valencian Community.

The delegations that constituted the Popular Executive Committee were established on 17 September 1936, as follows:

Cabinet Position	Office Holder	Political Party or Trade Union
Public Order	Gonzalo Navacerrada	PSOE
Propaganda, Press and Communications	Juan López Sánchez	CNT
Transport	José Prost	CNT
Economy & Supplies	Pérez Carretero	UGT
Work and Work Stoppage	Vicente Romero	UGT
Treasury	Juan Tejón	PSOE
War	José Benedito Lleó	EV
Militias	José Antonio Uribes	PCE
Agriculture	Antonio Sánchez	UR
Health	Francisco Bosch Morata	PVE
Justice	Sánchez Requena	PS
Movement control	Francisco Ravenat	POUM
Relations	Miguel San Andrés	IR
