= 81st Mixed Brigade =

- 81.ª Brigada Mixta
- Active: March 1937 – March 1939
- Country: Spanish Republic
- Allegiance: Republican faction
- Branch: Spanish Republican Army
- Type: Infantry
- Size: Brigade
- Engagements: Spanish Civil War

The 81st Mixed Brigade was a unit of the Spanish Republican Army created during the Spanish Civil War. It operated on the Teruel, Levante and Estremadura fronts.

== History ==
The unit was created in March 1937 from the militarization of the Torres-Benedito and Iberia columns. Among the militiamen there came to be some internal reluctance to the militarization, which took effect more slowly than expected. The brigade, which was assigned to the 39th Division, came under the initial command of Rafael Trigueros Sánchez-Rojas. Shortly after Trigueros would be replaced by Francisco Fayós Casarico.

In June 1937, the 81st MB was assigned as a reserve unit of the 13th Army Corps and sent to the rear, at Segorbe. A month later, it took part in the failed Battle of Albarracín, (Note: The attack on Albarracín was carried out by the 42nd Division, in support of the republican forces in the Battle of Brunete.) the 81st lead a rout, having to be disarmed by the 24th Division that had come to relieve it. Later it would be assigned to the 64th Division.

In December 1937, the unit took part in the Battle of Teruel, participating in the first movements of the republican offensive. The 81st MB was sent to the Campillo sector, where the unit carried out some looting actions. On December 30, nationalists attacked the positions manned by the 16th Mixed Brigade, which fell back and dragged the 81st MB into its withdrawal. The 81st Brigade suffered serious casualties, including that of its commander, Commander Fayós, who was taken prisoner by the nationalists. After being subjected to a reorganization by its new boss – Elisardo Martínez Sánchez – the unit took part in the capture of Teruel.

After the fighting in Teruel, the unit was incorporated into the Northern Coastal Defense Grouping. (Note: The 81st MB was integrated into the Northern Coastal Defense Grouping —which covered the Catalan coast— together to the 135th and 151st mixed brigades, in addition to a brigade and a cavalry regiment; All these forces were under the direct orders of Jesús Velasco Echave.) The unit remained deployed in Catalunya until May 17, 1938, when it was transported by boat to the coastal sector of Castellón de la Plana —as the republican zone had been cut in two in mid-April. The 81st MB was sent as reinforcement to this area, although it would not participate in the Levante Offensive.

On July 22, the 81st MB moved to the Extremadura front, where it joined the 10th Division, and then moved on to the Zújar Division in the Almorchón sector. After the Battle of Merida pocket, the brigade was incorporated into the 41st Division of the 7th Army Corps. The unit remained on this front during the rest of the war, without actually taking part in relevant military operations.

== Command ==
Commanders

- Rafael Trigueros Sánchez-Rojas
- Francisco Fayós Casarico;
- Elisardo Martínez Sánchez;
- Felipe Figueres

Commissars

- Vicente Esteve Esteve

Chiefs of Staff

- Francisco Fayós Casarico;
- Francisco Sevilla González;

== See also ==
- Iberia Column
- Mixed Brigades
- Torres-Benedito Column

== Bibliography ==
- Álvarez, Santiago (1989). Los comisarios políticos en el Ejército Popular de la República (in Spanish). Ediciós do Castro.
- Casanova, Ester (2008). La violencia política en la retaguardia republicana de Teruel durante la guerra civil (in Spanish). Instituto de Estudios Turolenses.
- Corral, Pedro (2005). Si me quieres escribir. La batalla de Teruel (in Spanish). DeBolsillo. ISBN 84-9793-626-4.
- Engel, Carlos (1999). Historia de las Brigadas Mixtas del Ejército Popular de la República (in Spanish). Madrid: Almena. ISBN 84-922644-7-0.
- Gabriel, Pere (2011). Historia de la UGT IV. Un sindicalismo en guerra (1936-1939) (in Spanish). Siglo XXI de España Editores.
- Maldonado, José M.ª (2007). El frente de Aragón. La Guerra Civil en Aragón (1936–1938) (in Spanish). Mira Editores. ISBN 978-84-8465-237-3.
- Martínez Bande, José Manuel (1970). La Invasión de Aragón y el desembarco en Mallorca (in Spanish). Madrid: Ed. San Martín.
- Martínez Bande, José Manuel (1973). La Gran ofensiva sobre Zaragoza (in Spanish). Madrid: Editorial San Martín.
- Martínez Bande, José Manuel (1978). La Batalla del Ebro (in Spanish). Madrid: Ed. San Martín.
- Martínez Bande, José Manuel (1981). La batalla de Pozoblanco y el cierre de la bolsa de Mérida (in Spanish). Madrid: Editorial San Martín.
- Zaragoza, Cristóbal (1983). Ejército Popular y Militares de la República, 1936-1939 (in Spanish). Barcelona: Ed. Planeta.
