= Torres-Benedito Column =

- Columna Torres-Benedito
- Active: 1936 - 1937
- Disbanded: 1937
- Country: Spanish Republic
- Branch: Confederal militias
- Type: Militia
- Role: Home defense
- Size: 4,100

Commanders
- Notable commanders: Domingo Torres, José Benedito Lleó

The Torres-Benedito Column was a militia column that operated at the beginning of the Spanish Civil War.

== History ==
The column was created in Valencia shortly after the outbreak of the Spanish Civil War. It was made up of soldiers from the former regiments of the region, as well as volunteers from the CNT, UGT, POUM, Syndicalist Party and Valencian Left. In total, it grouped 3,180 troops, of whom 842 were military and 2335 were militiamen. The leadership of these forces was in the hands of the anarchist Domingo Torres and the artillery lieutenant José Benedito Lleó, a member of the Valencian Left and a war delegate in the Popular Executive Committee of Valencia; while Torres acted as a kind of "political" delegate, Benedito performed the functions of military adviser. Politically, the column had a partially anarchist preponderance.

The column left Castellón on 18 August, crossing the province of Teruel until they reached the Francoist lines around the city of Teruel, taking positions in Villalba Baja and Corbalán. During its existence it operated on the Teruel Front, constituting one of the most important columns operating in the sector. Later it was reinforced by the Iberia Column and the CNT 13 Column, leaving all these forces under the command of Jesús Velasco Echave - who replaced Benedito in September. Later the column forces reached a total of 4,100 troops.

It came to have its own publication, "Victoria", a newspaper that was published in Alfambra.

In the spring of 1937 it was militarized and transformed into the 81st Mixed Brigade, a process that arrived after some internal opposition.

== See also ==
- Anarchism in Spain

== Bibliography ==
- Gabriel, Pere (2011). Historia de la UGT IV. Un sindicalismo en guerra (1936-1939) [History of UGT IV. A trade union at war (1936-1939)] (in Spanish). Siglo XXI de España Editores.
- Mainar, Eladi (1998). De milicians a soldats. Les columnes valencianes en la Guerra Civil Espanyola [From militiamen to soldiers. The Valencian columns in the Spanish Civil War (1936-1939)] (in Catalan). University of Valencia. ISBN 84-370-3349-7.
- Maldonado, José M.ª (2007). El frente de Aragón. La Guerra Civil en Aragón (1936–1938 [The Aragon front. The Civil War in Aragon (1936–1938)] (in Spanish). Mira Editores. ISBN 978-84-8465-237-3.
- Martínez Bande, José Manuel (1970). La Invasión de Aragón y el desembarco en Mallorca [The Invasion of Aragon and the landing in Mallorca] (in Spanish). Madrid: Ed. San Martín.
- Martínez Roda, Federico (1998). Valencia y las Valencias: su historia contemporánea (1800-1975) [Valencia and the Valencias: its contemporary history (1800-1975)] (in Spanish). Fundación Univ. San Pablo.
- Navarro, Francisco Javier (2004). A la revolución por la cultura [To the revolution for culture] (in Spanish). University of Valencia. ISBN 84-370-5866-X.
