= 41st Division (Spain) =

- 41.ª División
- Active: 14 April 1937 – 25 July 1938; 15 August 1938 – March 1939
- Country: Spanish Republic
- Allegiance: (Second Spanish Republic) Republican faction
- Branch: Spanish Republican Army
- Type: Infantry
- Size: Division
- Engagements: Spanish Civil War: Battle of Teruel; Battle of Alfambra; Levante Offensive; Battle of the Merida pocket

The 41st Division was one of the divisions of the People's Army of the Republic that were organized during the Spanish Civil War on the basis of the Mixed Brigades. It took part in the battles of Teruel, Alfambra and Levante.

== History ==
The unit was formed in April 1937, on the Teruel front. It was made up of the 57th, 58th and 83rd mixed brigades. The division was initially assigned to the "Teruel Operations Army". (Note: This unit had been created on April 14, 1937, under the command of Jesús Velasco Echave, and was made up of the 39th, 40th, 41st and 42nd divisions.) It was subsequently attached to the XIII Army Corps. The 41st Division, attached to the XIX Army Corps, was present during the Battle of Teruel.

In the face of the nationalist offensive on the Levante front, the division was added to the so-called "Army Corps of the Coast", defending the coastal sector; later, it was attached to the XXII Army Corps. In June the 41st Division was located at the height of Castellón de la Plana, which was lost on June 14. Later, the unit went to act as a reserve in the region of Sagunto-Almenara, undergoing a reorganization process.

Some time later it was sent as reinforcement to the Extremadura front, to fight in the Battle of Merida pocket. During the fighting that followed, the unit was severely broken, having to undergo a profound reorganization. (Note: According to Carlos Engel the division was dissolved in July 1938, reorganized and recreated again on August 15, 1938, with the 81st, 91st and 193rd mixed brigades.) The unit was assigned to the VII Army Corps.

== Command ==
Commanders

- Manuel Eixea Vilar;
- Luis Menéndez Maseras;
- Antonio Cortina Pascual;
- Damián Fernández Calderón;

Commissars

- Marcos García Callejo, of the CNT;
- Félix Navarro Serrano, of the PCE;
- Germán Clemente de la Cruz;

Chiefs of Staff

- Agustín Fuster Picó;
- José Rodríguez Pérez;
- Manuel Farra Cerdán;

== Organization ==
Date	Attached Army Corps	Integrated Mixed Brigades	Battle front
April-May 1937	XIII Army Corps	57th, 58th, 83rd	Teruel
December 1937	XIX Army Corps	57th, 58th, 97th	Teruel
April 30, 1938	Coast Army Corps	57th, 58th, 83rd	Levante
August 1938	VII Army Corps	4th, 81st, 193rd	Estremadura
December 1938	VII Army Corps	81st, 91st, 193rd	Estremadura

== Bibliography ==
- Álvarez Gómez, Santiago (1989). Los comisarios políticos en el Ejército Popular de la República (in Spanish). Ediciós do Castro.
- Engel, Carlos (1999). Historia de las Brigadas Mixtas del Ejército Popular de la República (in Spanish). Madrid: Almena. 84-922644-7-0.
- Maldonado, José M.ª (2007). El frente de Aragón. La Guerra Civil en Aragón (1936–1938) (in Spanish). Mira Editores. ISBN 978-84-8465-237-3.
- Martínez Bande, José Manuel (1977). La ofensiva sobre Valencia (in Spanish). Madrid: Editorial San Martín.
- Martínez Bande, José Manuel (1981). La batalla de Pozoblanco y el cierre de la bolsa de Mérida (in Spanish). Madrid: Editorial San Martín.
- VV.AA. (1990). Historia general de España y América XVII. La segunda república y la guerra civil (in Spanish). Madrid: Ediciones Rialp.
- Zaragoza, Cristóbal (1983). Ejército Popular y Militares de la República, 1936-1939 (in Spanish). Barcelona: Ed. Planeta.
