= José Pellicer Gandía =

Valencian anarchist revolutionary (1912–1942)

José Pellicer
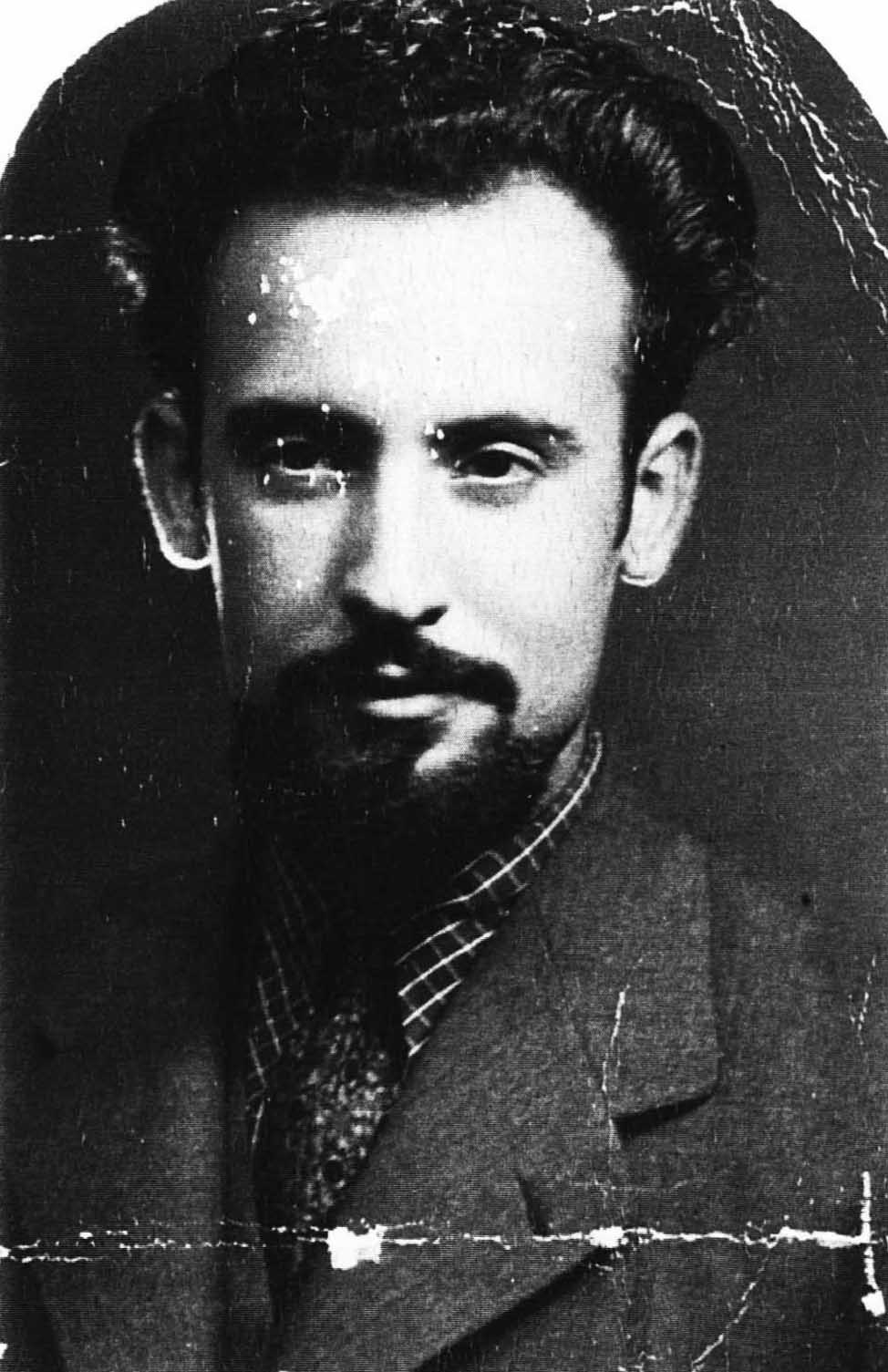
- Born: José Pellicer Gandía; 28 April 1912; València, Spain
- Died: 8 June 1942 (aged 30); Paterna, València, Spain
- Spouse: Maruja Veloso
- Children: Coral Pellicer
- Relatives: Pedro Pellicer Gandía (brother)
- Military career
- Allegiance: Spanish Republic
- Service: Confederal militias (1936–1937); Spanish Republican Army (1937–1939)
- Service years: 1936–1939
- Rank: Major
- Units: Iron Column (1936–1937); 83rd Mixed Brigade (1937); 109th Mixed Brigade (1937–1939)
- Conflicts: Spanish Civil War

José Pellicer Gandía (1912–1942) was a Valencian anarchist revolutionary primarily known for commanding the Iron Column during the Spanish Civil War. Born into a well-off family, after the establishment of the Second Spanish Republic, Pellicer became an anarchist and joined the Confederación Nacional del Trabajo (CNT). He participated in a series of anarchist uprisings throughout the 1930s, establishing defence committees that set the foundation for the militias that would fight in the civil war. He co-founded the Iron Column, which pushed the Nationalists out of Valencia and into the province of Teruel, where he fought on the front lines. During the war, he came into conflict with the Communist Party of Spain (PCE), with the Servicio de Información Militar (SIM) arresting and imprisoning him. Despite this, he continued to fight in the Spanish Republican Army after the Iron Column's dissolution, as commander of the 83rd Mixed Brigade and later within the 109th Mixed Brigade. With the end of the war, he was captured and executed by the Francoist dictatorship.

== Biography ==
=== Early life and activism ===
On 28 April 1912, José Pellicer Gandía was born in Valencia. He grew up in a well-off family, which provided him with a decent education. Interested in political philosophy and versed in multiple languages, he was soon attracted to anarchism, due to a sense of altruism and idealism. Around this time, during an Esperanto class, he met the Valencian physician Maruja Veloso, whom he later married. Pellicer worked as a bookkeeper, joining the Confederación Nacional del Trabajo (CNT) in 1932.

He later joined the Federación Anarquista Ibérica (FAI), within which he participated in a series of anarchist uprisings throughout the mid-1930s, including an insurrectionary strike in Manresa in 1932 and the Revolution of 1934. He also participated in the founding of the CNT defence committees, which later evolved into militia formations that would fight against the Spanish coup of July 1936.

=== Spanish Civil War ===
With the outbreak of the Spanish Civil War, Pellicer co-founded the Iron Column. Together with 1,000 other men in the column, Pellicer seized weapons from the local army barracks in Valencia and pushed the Nationalists back into Aragon, fighting first in Sarrión, then the Escandón Pass, before the front stabilised outside Teruel. During the fighting on Teruel front, Pellicer distinguished himself as a fighter. He also displayed the qualities of a charismatic anarchist thinker, during the Iron Column's time propagandising to the local peasantry in the province of Teruel.

Command of the column was held under the collective leadership of a War Committee, on which Pellicer himself served as a member. In October 1936, after a member of the column was killed by Republican authorities in Valencia, the column quit the front and attacked the Communist Party headquarters at the Plaza de Tetuán, where Pellicer was wounded in the fighting. After it was restructured on 4 December 1936, Pellicer remained on the War Committee as its delegate to the Valencia headquarters.

In March 1937, the Iron Column was dissolved and reorganised into the 83rd Mixed Brigade of the Spanish Republican Army. Pellicer was appointed as its commander and given the rank of Major; soon after he was wounded on the front at Albarracín. In August 1937, he was arrested by the Servicio de Información Militar (SIM), under the pretext that he had "failed to explain the use of some automobile tyres", and imprisoned in Barcelona until the end of the month. After his release, he was restored to his command of the 83rd Brigade and flew back to Valencia by plane. In October 1937, he was transferred to the command of the 4th Battalion of the 109th Mixed Brigade.

During the last months of the war, Pellicer was in Alacant, where he was arrested by the Italian Army and tortured by the victorious Spanish nationalists.

=== Trial and execution ===
After several years of imprisonment, Pellicer was tried by a military tribunal in the province of Valencia on 26 May 1942. He was admonished for his participation in the armed struggle against the Nationalists. The tribunal found him guilty of the charges, with "extremely significant aggravating circumstances", and sentenced him to death. On 8 June 1942, Pellicer was executed in Paterna by the Francoist dictatorship. Although executed by shooting, his death certificate officially recorded that he had died from internal bleeding.

Pellicer's wife had managed to secure clemency for him, but the Falangist authorities kept the clemency order unopened in a box and handed it over to her after Pellicer's execution. After the Spanish transition to democracy, at the request of Pellicer's daughter Coral Pellicer, the Valencian Military Court released the documents of Pellicer's trial and execution.

== Bibliography ==
- Amorós, Miguel [in Catalan] (18 April 2013a) [27 April 2004]. "José Pellicer". Gimenologues. Translated by Recluse, Alias – via Libcom.org.
- Amorós, Miguel [in Catalan] (18 April 2013b) [8 June 2008]. "The day they killed José Pellicer". Gimenologues. Translated by Recluse, Alias – via Libcom.org.
- Blay, Juan Antonio (July 2006). "The Valencian Durruti [José Pellicer Gandía of the Iron Column]". KSL: Bulletin of the Kate Sharpley Library. No. 46–47. Translated by Sharkey, Paul. Kate Sharpley Library.
- Paz, Abel (2011). The Story of the Iron Column: Militant Anarchism in the Spanish Civil War. Translated by Sharkey, Paul. Edinburgh: AK Press. ISBN 978-1-84935-064-8. LCCN 2011920480.
