= Defense Council (Catalonia) =

- Council of Defense of the Generalitat de Catalunya
- Conselleria de Defensa de la Generalitat de Catalunya
- Established: 31 July 1936; 90 years ago
- Dissolved: 5 May 1937; 89 years ago
- Parent organization: Generalitat de Catalunya

The Defense Council (Catalan: Conselleria de Defensa) was a ministry created by the Generalitat de Catalunya on 2 August 1936, and that existed during the first years of the Spanish Civil War to take charge of military matters in Catalonia, despite the fact that defense powers were exclusive to the government of the Republic.

== History ==
After the outbreak of the Spanish Civil War, the Generalitat de Catalunya began to assume powers that did not correspond to it according to the Republican Constitution and also according to its own Statute of Autonomy. On 31 July 1936 the government of the Generalitat established a Ministry of Defence to take charge of the military issues. This body was clearly unconstitutional since the powers of defense belonged to the government of Madrid. Such a fact would have had serious implications in a normal situation, but in the context of the chaos of the first days of the conflict this was another fact that went unnoticed. (Note: In the context of the Spanish Revolution of 1936, in the face of the impotence and disorganization of the central government, the Generalitat took over the customs and border posts, the ports and the railways, the headquarters of the Bank of Spain in Barcelona, and even issued currency and granted pardons. Although they were the exclusive competence of the central government, during the first months of the struggle the republican government did not protest against this usurpation of functions by the Generalitat.)

Lieutenant Colonel Felip Díaz i Sandino was appointed Minister of Defense. Vicenç Guarner was appointed Undersecretary of the Ministry in August 1936, being in charge of organizing the columns that left towards the Front of Aragon, to establish military industries, officers' schools and fortifications. Another of the works carried out by this body was the establishment of a war industry in Barcelona to support the republican war effort, given that in Catalonia there was no such industry. The Generalitat took over a dozen factories, although in reality they were controlled by anarchists.

The lack of coordination with the Madrid authorities was another major problem. For example, militias from Barcelona operating on the Aragon Front did so from the outset without any coordination with the Ministry of War in Madrid, which also happened during the Mallorca landings. When the Minister of Navy and Air, the socialist Indalecio Prieto, visited Díaz i Sandino, he was received "as if he were a minister of a foreign power".

Díaz Sandino achieved the dissolution of the Committee of Antifascist Militias of Catalonia in October 1936, which in theory left him at the head of all military forces for Catalonia. For Díaz Sandino it was a priority to carry out the militarization of the militias, as had already been done in the central area. On 6 December, he signed a decree creating the People's Army of Catalonia, which in theory consisted of three divisions, nine infantry regiments, three artillery regiments and numerous support groups. However, despite his daring efforts, he was unable to carry out the long-awaited militarization and the anarchist militias continued to enjoy broad autonomy in both Catalonia and the Front of Aragon. Certainly, the anarchists also had a great influence within the Ministry of Defense, and after December 1936, it was an anarchist, Francesc Isgleas i Piarnau, who served as Minister of Defense.

After the May Days, the republican government intervened in Catalonia and regained its powers in defense matters, so the Ministry was dissolved. The Popular Army of Catalonia was also dissolved and in its place the Eastern Army was created, which proceeded to the definitive militarization of the militias.

== Ministers ==
Name	Start	End
Felip Díaz i Sandino	31 July 1936	17 December 1936
Francesc Isgleas i Piarnau	17 December 1936	5 May 1937

== See also ==
- People's Army of Catalonia
- War Industries Commission
- Central Committee of Antifascist Militias of Catalonia

== Bibliography ==
- Alexander, Robert J. (1999). The Anarchists in the Spanish Civil War. Volumen I. Janus Publishing Company Lim. ISBN 978-1-85756-412-9.
- Alpert, Michael (2013). El Ejército Republicano en la Guerra Civil (in Spanish). Cambridge University Press. ISBN 978-84-3230-682-2.
- Berger, Gonzalo (2018). Les milícies antifeixistes de Catalunya : voluntaris per la llibertat (in Catalan). Vic: Eumo. ISBN 9788497666404. OCLC 1056199061.
- Gonzàlez, Enric; Ucelay-Da Cal, Enric (2012). Contra Companys, 1936: La frustración nacionalista ante la Revolución (in Spanish). Universidad de Valencia.
- Pagès i Blanch, Pelai (2013). War and Revolution in Catalonia, 1936-1939. Leiden: Koninklijke Brill NV. ISBN 978-90-04-25427-5.
- Thomas, Hugh (1976). Historia de la Guerra Civil Española (in Spanish). Barcelona: Círculo de Lectores. ISBN 84-226-0874-X.
