= Internal Security Board of CataIonia =

Internal Security Board
- Internal Security Board of Catalonia
- Junta de Seguretat Interior de Catalunya
- Established: 4 September 1936; 90 years ago
- Dissolved: 5 May 1937; 89 years ago
- Secretary General: Aurelio Fernández Sánchez

The Internal Security Board of Catalonia (Catalan: Junta de Seguretat Interior de Catalunya) was a body created in September 1936 as a result of the pact reached by the republican political forces on the one hand and the CNT-FAI on the other. The Generalitat de Catalunya and all democratic parties reached this agreement with the CNT-FAI to try to pacify public safety, severely altered since the July 1936 military coup, under the auspices of the anarcho-syndicalist organization. This pact involved the dissolution of the Central Committee of Antifascist Militias, replaced in part by the Junta. The militant anarchist Aurelio Fernández Sánchez was appointed general secretary, while in one way or another Rafael Vidiella (PSOE) and Joaquim Olaso i Piera (PSUC) were also present, as well as Tomàs Fàbregas Valls (ACR).

The Junta was formally an organ of the Generalitat, and therefore subordinate to its government, which assumed the supervision of public order in Catalonia. In practice it meant that it inherited the real power over the Catalan workers' control patrols from the dissolved Committee. The Board was composed of delegates from the Control Patrols, the National Republican Guard, the political parties and the trade unions. However, the control patrols were completely autonomous and were easily carried away by ideological exaltation, as was the case with the La Fatarella Events: it was not until the arrival of the undersecretary of the Presidency of the Generalitat Martí Rouret, accompanied by the same Aurelio Fernandez, who put a stop to the murders.

When the Generalitat ordered the dissolution of the violent control patrols on 26 March 1937, the Internal Security Board tried to resist; until it was dissolved after the defeat of the CNT-FAI and the POUM in the May Days.

== See also ==
- Central Committee of Antifascist Militias of Catalonia
- Defense Council (Catalonia)
