= People's Army of Catalonia =

Catalan military unit which fought in the Spanish Civil War

People's Army of Catalonia Exèrcit Popular de Catalunya
- Flag of Catalonia
- Active: December 1936–May 1937
- Country: Catalonia ( Spain)
- Allegiance: Government of Catalonia
- Type: Army
- Role: Ground defence
- Size: 40.000 (theoretically)
- Engagements: Spanish Civil War (Aragon front)

Commanders
- Notable commanders: Guillem de la Peña i Cusí; José Eduardo Villalba Rubio; Eduardo Medrano Rivas

The People's Army of Catalonia (Catalan: Exèrcit Popular de Catalunya) (Note: It is sometimes referred to as the Catalan Popular Army, National Army of Catalonia or simply Army of Catalonia.) was an army created by the Generalitat of Catalonia on December 6, 1936, during the Spanish Civil War. Its existence was more theoretical than real, because the original structure of the popular militias continued to exist despite the efforts of the Generalitat. After the May Days it was dissolved and its structure assumed by the Spanish Republican Army, which definitively militarized the militias of Catalonia and Aragon.

== History ==
After the outbreak of the Spanish Civil War, the Generalitat of Catalonia began to assume powers that had not been devolved to it according to the Spanish Constitution and also according to its own Statute of Autonomy. On July 31, the Government of the Generalitat established a Defense Ministry, a clearly unconstitutional body given that the defense powers belonged to the Government of Madrid. The Generalitat also organized its own war industry. In autumn, following the decree of the central government by which the militias were militarized, the Generalitat took the first steps towards the creation of a "Catalan army".

On October 24, 1936, the Generalitat of Catalonia dissolved the Central Committee of Antifascist Militias with the aim of reorganizing the military forces in Catalonia and militarizing paramilitary militia units. On December 6, 1936, the creation of the "People's Army of Catalonia" was decreed, decree signed by the Defense Minister of Catalonia, Felipe Díaz Sandino. The army was made up of 9 infantry regiments, 3 artillery regiments, 3 cavalry groups, 3 engineers' groups, a group of officers and a health group, grouping the forces of the Aragon front. It was decided to base the organization on regiments – and not in mixed brigades – which would be made up of about 6,500 troops, which could be organized into divisions. On December 16, three administrative divisions were established: the 1st, based in Barcelona, was under the command of Colonel Guillem de la Peña i Cusí; the 2nd, based in Girona, was under the command of Colonel José Villalba Rubio; and finally the 3rd, based in Tarragona, was commanded by commander Eduardo Medrano Rivas. In theory their forces were theoretically around 40,000 men, but these forces were more so on paper and in reality their strength was much smaller.

It did not take long for the Catalan authorities to run into major difficulties. It was evident that the republican government, which months before had created the People's Army of the Republic, did not sympathize with the idea of the Generalitat. Within Catalonia itself, the PSUC and the UGT did not support this initiative either, and quite the contrary, they encouraged the militias of Catalonia and the Aragon front to adopt the structure of the People's Army of the Republic, which included their militarization. In the case of the anarchists, they were not especially enthusiastic and if they did not oppose the military project of the Generalitat, it was because it allowed them to continue maintaining an independence that they would lose if they were subjected to militarization and integration into the Republican Army.

On February 20, Colonel Vicenç Guarner i Vivancos, undersecretary of the Ministry of Defense, signed a decree that reorganized the structure of the Catalan Army. It was now made up of five divisions (the Ascaso Division, Durruti Division, Jubert Division, Karl Marx Division and Lenin Division) formed from the old militia columns and also two independent groupings (the old Macià-Companys and Volant Catalana columns) all of them arranged in the Aragón Front. Several more support units were formed, such as machine gun battalions in the rear, but the previous militia structure was remained intact and the measure did not have a great effect. For example, the Ministry of Defense could not appoint heads of anarchist units and they had to choose them from a list drawn up by the Regional Defense Committee of the CNT.

After the May Days, the Republican Government regained its power over Catalonia. General Sebastián Pozas assumed military command in Catalonia. The Catalan Army disappeared and its units were integrated into the Republican Army. (Note: Las former popular militias were forcibly militarized and lost their own structure. The anarchist units became the 25th, 26th and 28th divisions, while the PSUC militia was reconstituted as 27th Division, the militia of the POUM in the 29th Division and the Macià-Companys Column in the 30th Division.) All these units were integrated into the Eastern Army, which assumed the structure of the old Army of Catalonia and began to garrison the Front of Aragon.

== Bibliography ==
- Alpert, Michael (1989). El ejército popular de la República, 1936–1939 (in Spanish).
- Castillo, Santiago (2011). Historia de la UGT. Un sindicalismo en guerra, 1936–1939 (in Spanish). Siglo XXI de España.
- Gonzàlez i Vilalta, Arnau; Ucelay-Da Cal, Enric (2012). Contra Companys, 1936: La frustración nacionalista ante la Revolución (in Spanish). Universidad de Valencia.
- Martínez Bande, José Manuel (1970). La Invasión de Aragón y el desembarco en Mallorca (in Spanish). San Martín.
- Núñez Seixas, Xosé Manoel (2006). ¡Fuera el invasor! Nacionalismos y movilización bélica durante la Guerra civil española (in Spanish). Madrid: Marcial Pons Ediciones de Historia. p. 396. ISBN 978-84-15817-90-1. OCLC 753321271.
- Thomas, Hugh (1977). The Spanish Civil War. London: Hamish Hamilton. ISBN 0241894506. OCLC 14963349.
