= Central Committee of Anti-Fascist Militias of Catalonia =

Administrative body of Catalonia (July–October 1936)

- Comitè Central de Milícies Antifeixistes de Catalunya
- Organization chart of the Central Committee of Anti-Fascist Militias
- Active: 21 July–1 October 1936
- Disbanded: 1 October 1936
- Country: Catalonia (Spanish Republic)
- Type: Administrative division
- Garrison/HQ: Barcelona

The Central Committee of Anti-Fascist Militias of Catalonia (Catalan: Comitè Central de Milícies Antifeixistes de Catalunya, CCMA) was an administrative body created on 21 July 1936 by the president of the Government of Catalonia, Lluís Companys, under pressure by the anarcho-syndicalists of the National Confederation of Labor (CNT) and Iberian Anarchist Federation (FAI), which led the workers' struggle against the July 1936 military uprising in Barcelona.

== History ==
=== Beginnings ===
The 18 July coup failed to gain control of Catalonia, due to the victory of republican forces on the one hand and the workers' revolt led by the CNT-FAI on the other. These events turned the distribution of power in Catalonia upside down: the anarchists, until recently relegated to the underground, emerged as the main force after defeating and taking control of strategic positions in the city, such as the artillery barracks of L'Harmonia. There they captured 30,000 rifles which they distributed among their militias.

After the defeat of the military uprising in Barcelona, the CNT was in a position of superiority over the rest of the Republican faction in Catalonia. However, the situation was very unclear in the rest of Spain. The news that came was quite confusing and contradictory about cities changing sides. From the first days the Generalitat of Catalonia was totally overwhelmed by the mass actions in the streets, through popular committees that organized life in the neighborhoods of Barcelona. Likewise, popular militias were formed with weapons seized from army arsenals and they went in groups to liberate other areas held by the rebel army (even before the first columns of militias were established).

In this situation of lack of legitimacy of the republican state, a joint body was established by the different Catalan anti-fascist political parties and trade unions (which at that time dominated the streets). Thus, the CCMA became a parallel government that coexisted with that of the Generalitat for two months. At no time was it a "dual power" structure as in the time of the soviets in Russia, but a duplication of powers. The two governments coexisted and did not face each other until the dissolution of the CCMA was decided on in August.

When, on 20 July, Companys received the anarchist delegates, who were practically coming straight from a 30-hour battle in which they had not yet slept or washed, he told them:

First of all, I have to tell you that the C.N.T. and the F.A.I. they have never been treated as they deserved for their true importance. You have always been harshly persecuted; and though I was with you before, I, with much pain, but forced by the political realities of the time to confront and persecute you. Today you are the owners of the city and Catalonia, because only you have defeated the fascist military, and I hope that it will not hurt you that at this moment I remind you that you have not lacked the help of the few or many loyal men of my party and the guards and mossos ...

But the truth is that, harshly persecuted until the day before yesterday, today you have defeated the military and fascists. Therefore, knowing who you are, I cannot use language that is not of great sincerity. You have overcome and everything is in your power; If you do not need me or do not love me as President of Catalonia, tell me now that I will become one more soldier in the fight against fascism. If, on the contrary, you believe in this position, that only in death I would have left it to the triumphant fascists, I can, with the men of my party, my name and my prestige, be useful in this fight, which although it ends today along with my prestige in the city, we do not know when and how it will end in the rest of Spain, you can count on me and my loyalty as a man and as a politician who is convinced that today a whole embarrassing past is dying, and who sincerely wishes that Catalonia leads the way of the most advanced countries in social matters.

— Memories of Juan García Oliver

According to some testimonies, Companys himself was the architect of the idea:

Companys proposed to the anarcho-syndicalist leaders the creation of a new organism, made up of representatives of all the leftist and unionist political forces, that would be in charge of facing the fascist threat. This body was to be called the Central Committee of Anti-Fascist Militias. The first objective that Companys considered was to reorganize the armed forces through this new organism, and gave this purpose to the Militia Committee, which extended membership to all political and union forces hoping that anarchists, essentially combative men, would join it and ignore political matters.

— Ramon Brusco, 2003

The Committee had a clear predominance of anarchist organizations, although it included all the forces of the Popular Front (ERC, POUM, PSUC, Republican Union, Unió de Rabassaires and UGT). It had a delegate commissioner from the Government of Catalonia, named Lluís Prunés, and a military chief, named Enric Pérez i Farràs. In practice, it was the strong personality of the anarchist Juan García Oliver that dominated the committee during its two months of life.

The Committee settled immediately in a large building in the Pla de Palau, in Barcelona, occupied by the Nautical School. It quickly organized and carried out the first expeditions of militiamen to the Aragon front. Three of its members, Buenaventura Durruti, Pérez i Farrás and Del Barrio, took direct command of two sectors of struggle in this first outflow of forces. Within a few days, they were able to organize a front in Aragon with a force of around 11,000 troops, between the military and militias.

Before the collapse of the state authority in Catalonia, the Militia Committee was a living organ which had to face the war, precipitously creating what the war needed and which did not exist in Catalonia at the time: the organization of armed forces, creation of War Schools, Military Health, supplies, transportation, war industries, operations management, etc. The Committee and the Ministry of Defense were responsible for assembling and equipping the militia columns. With the application of the non-intervention treaty on 8 August 1936, it became impossible to legally purchase war material from the European democracies, the committee was forced to buy weapons illegally from traffickers and pass -they across the French border.

Frequently, the authority of the Central Militia Committee ended on the outskirts of Barcelona, where the power of the revolutionary committees of each locality began. Simultaneously with the Central Committee, there existed other Territorial Power Boards around Catalonia. In the province of Tarragona, in the industrial city of Reus, a local Popular Front government had been formed that was led by anarcho-syndicalists. In the city of Lleida, the Territorial Power Board was under the control of the POUM, and within it there was no representation for other republican parties nor did it have any type of link with the Generalitat.

=== Development ===
Between 21 July and mid-August 1936, the Control Patrols were established under the "Central Committee of Anti-Fascist Militias" (CCMA). Approximately half of the 700 patrol cars had a CNT card, or were from the FAI; the other half was affiliated with the other component organizations of the CCMA. Only four section delegates, out of the eleven that existed, were from the CNT: those from Poblenou, Sants, L'Harmonia and Clot; four others were from ERC, three from PSUC and none from POUM. The Control Patrols depended on the CCMA Investigation Committee, led by Aurelio Fernández (FAI) and Salvador González (PSUC).

At the suggestion of Martí Barrera i Maresma, the Consell d'Economia de Catalunya (Economic Council of Catalonia) was created on 11 August 1936 to carry out a socialist transformation of the economic and social foundations of Catalonia.

The Battle of Majorca revealed the inabilities of the CCMA, not only to organize itself, but even to learn of all the military operations that were being carried out from Catalonia. The Majorca operation was organized by the Generalitat (dominated by ERC) in collusion with the PSUC and in which the Barcelona Transport Union of the CNT also participated, on the initiative of the commander Alberto Bayo. The CCMA (which was supposed to command all military operations) learned of the operation when the troops were already embarking from the port of Barcelona.

=== Dissolution ===
The CNT's superior committees, which controlled the CCMA, decided in mid-August to abolish its operation and replace it with a stronger government in the Generalitat. The formal abolition of the CCMA was announced on 27 September, along with the dissolution of the control patrols, by Luis Companys himself. Once the suppression of the CCMA was decided, the expansion of the Government of the Generalitat was negotiated to include all anti-fascist and trade union forces. The idea was to gain efficiency and avoid the duplication of powers. Finally, on 1 October 1936 the CCMA dissolved itself, among other reasons, due to a certain stabilization of the situation at the institutional level and the need to reinforce the governing role of the Generalitat. Some representatives of the Committee were integrated into the Government of Catalonia. The dissolution of the Central Committee of Militias left the Catalan Defense Ministry with the theoretical control over the militias operating in Catalonia, although they continued to enjoy great autonomy and escape the control of the authorities. In turn, after the establishment of the new Spanish Republican Army, on 28 October the Defense Ministry published a new decree proclaiming the militarization of the militias, which were absorbed by the regular republican army. The authority over the control patrols passed into the hands of a new government body created specifically for that issue: the Junta de Seguretat Interior de Catalunya, which was left in the hands of the CNT-FAI member Aurelio Fernández Sánchez. Regionally, the People's Army of Catalonia was set up to succeed the Catalan militias.

== See also ==
- Regional Defence Council of Aragon
- Popular Executive Committee of Valencia
- Control Patrols
- Confederal militias
- Revolutionary Catalonia

== Bibliography ==
- Pozo González, Josep Antoni (2012). "The Government of the Generalitat before the Central Committee of Antifascist Militias and the various local revolutionary powers". Legal power and real power in revolutionary Catalonia of 1936 (in Spanish). Espuela de Plata. ISBN 9788415177708.
- Public order and violence in Catalonia (1936–1937). Dau. 2011. ISBN 9788493662554.
