= General Ruiz =

General Ruiz may refer to:

- Gonzalo Ruiz (fl. 1122–1180 or 1146–1202), Spanish general
- Gregorio Ruiz (1844–1913), Mexican general
- José Jiménez Ruiz (born 1946), Spanish Air Force general
- Luis García Ruiz (1877–1949), Spanish Republic Army general
