= National Republican Guard =

National Republican Guard or Republican National Guard may refer to:

- National Republican Guard (Portugal)
- National Republican Guard (Spain)
- National Republican Guard (Italy)
- National Republican Guard (The Gambia)
