= Control Patrols =

Control Patrols Patrullas de Control

Agency overview
- Formed: August 1936
- Dissolved: 4 June 1937
- Superseding agency: Military Information Service
- Employees: 700

Jurisdictional structure
- Operations jurisdiction: Revolutionary Catalonia|Catalonia

Operational structure
- Headquarters: 617 Gran Via de les Corts Catalanes, Barcelona
- Parent agency: Central Committee of Anti-fascist Militias of Catalonia

The Control Patrols (Spanish: Patrullas de Control) of the Central Committee of Anti-fascist Militias of Catalonia was a public order force, mainly composed by CNT-FAI militias, replacing the official police forces which had been discredited after the coup d'état of July 1936, as about half of the police forces had joined the Nationalist side. In Barcelona's neighborhoods, and in many towns of Catalonia, committees were created that managed their own local militias, and even coordinated to go to the front. The number of armed people in Barcelona was quite large due to the assault on the San Andrés Barracks, after which 30,000 rifles had been seized and were scattered throughout the city.

The organization was created in August 1936 with the mission of prosecuting collaborators of the military revolt. After a violent phase followed by a progressive control of the Generalitat of Catalonia, the patrols were dissolved in June 1937 due to the military and political control taken by the Communist Party of Spain and other pro-Soviet forces. During their short period of existence, these groups detained and executed many members of the Church, Carlists, and other people accused of being fascist or pro-nationalist in Barcelona and the surrounding areas.

== Scope of action ==
This revolutionary public order force acted in parallel to the Police Headquarters under the direction of the Junta de Seguridad del Comité. The patrols were coordinated by a General Secretariat, located at 617 Gran Via de les Corts Catalanes in Barcelona. The investigation services of the CNT-FAI functioned in cooperation to the control patrols. The patrols were divided into territorial sectors, in addition to port and railway patrols. Each section had a detention center and a delegate. The main detention center was found in the former convent of San Elías, at the foot of Tibidabo. Control of the sections was shared among parties with representation on the Junta de Seguridad del Comité. The CNT-FAI had control of the General Secretariat and the simple majority in most sectors.

Its scope of action was the districts of Barcelona, which at this time (August 1936) was experiencing a wave of revolution and violence. Numerous murders and crimes were taking place, with FAI releasing a document dated 30 July in which it distances itself from the excess violence:

"An Investigation Committee functions as an appendix to the Committee of Anti-Fascist Militias, which will take care of verifying all the denunciations that are made about the activities of the elements involved in the past fascist movement. This committee is the only one, apart from the Superior Police Headquarters, which, from this moment, has the right to order and carry out house searches. WHATEVER IS DONE ON THE EDGE OF IT WILL BE AN OUTRAGE. And the FAI is willing to put an end to those groups of the unconscious, outside the control of our Organization, who, who knows for what purposes, dishonor the revolutionary movement of the people, who have taken up arms against fascism. We do not know what elements these are, but we affirm with energy, whoever they are, they are denounced by their own actions, in the best of cases, as cloudy souls, in which the just instinct of the people is adulterated, awakening primitive voices nested in the darkest of his conscience." - Solidaridad Obrera and Boletín de Información.

The sectors consisted of militiamen from different political affiliations: Confederación Nacional del Trabajo (CNT), Esquerra Republicana de Catalunya (ERC), Unión General de Trabajadores (UGT) and Partido Obrero de Unificación Marxista (POUM). The distribution of militiamen per affiliation was as follows:

Sector	CNT militiamen	ERC militiamen	UGT militiamen	POUM militiamen	Total militiamen (without delegate)
Ciutat Vella	30	15	10	3	58
Aragó-Muntaner	20	15	10	3	48
Estació del Nord-Barceloneta	30	15	10	3	58
Poble Sec-Casa Antúnez	28	10	10	3	51
Sants-Hostafrancs	25	15	10	3	53
Bonanova-Pedralbes	25	15	15	3	58
Gràcia-San Gervasi	30	15	15	4	64
El Clot-El Poblet	30	15	15	3	63
Horta-Carmelo-Guinardó	25	15	15	5	60
Sant Andreu	27	20	10	5	62
El Poblenou	30	20	10	5	65
Central	25	15	15	5	60
Total	325	185	145	45	700

The CNT, despite having almost half of the militiamen of the patrols, only had delegates in 4 of the sectors (Poblenou, El Clot-El Poblet, Sant Andreu and Sants-Hostafrancs).

== Violence ==
The Patrols were the work of the Central Committee of Anti-Fascist Militias of Catalonia, and were promoted by the CNT and the FAI, and later supported by the rest of the Popular Front organizations to put an end to the violent chaos which occurred in Barcelona. In principle, it was about putting an end to the supporters of the military uprising who often fired from the city's balconies and roofs. But gradually their purpose extended and included containing the revolutionary violence of different neighborhood committees and unions. In these first months there were militias belonging to each political organization or union.

However, historians critical of the Republican side consider the Patrols to be dedicated to perpetrating arbitrary murders, especially of soldiers, businessmen and priests. According to this version, the detainees were taken to the dungeons of detention centers where they were tortured and finally executed after being taken to an isolated place; the euphemistically called paso (meaning ride/walk). According to César Alcalá, around 1500 people were executed (without a trial) by the Control Patrols between September 1936 and April 1937. The Control Patrols played this violent role during events such as the persecution of the Maristas in Barcelona in 1936, with 172 people being executed during the months of July to October of that year.

Critical voices against the Control Patrols increased as the Generalitat and the Unified Socialist Party of Catalonia (PSUC) took a position of stricter control over the anarchists. The Patrols were often self-servingly equated with the armed groups of CNT and FAI. This was due to their predominance in this police force. In Barcelona, the Civil Guard remained quartered for several months and the Assault Guard, despite being on the streets, barely served as a Republican police.

== Pressure for disbandment from the Republican Party ==
The Central Committee of Antifascist Militias ended up dissolving in September 1936, when CNT decided to enter the government of the Generalitat on 27 September. It was the first government in which anarchists participated. The government - originally called the Council of the Generalitat of Catalonia - was chaired by Josep Tarradellas who would also take charge of finances. To manage public order, an Internal Security Board was created, chaired by the new internal security advisor Artemi Aiguader i Miró, from ERC.

The Board was created on 5 October. In addition to Aiguader, who was the chairman, participants from ERC included Miquel Guinart, and Joan Pons Garlandí; from CNT Vicente Gil Mata, Dionisio Eroles, and Aurelio Fernández (the last as general secretary); from PSUC, Rafael Vidiella Franch and Joaquín Olaso; from Josep Coll; and from Unió de Rabassaires, Cristóbal Rebull. The general commissioner of public order, the director of local administration, and the head of central services of the security department attended as technical assistants. Immediately, a power struggle started between CNT, which intended to be an entity independent of the government, and ERC and PSUC, who wanted the Board to be an annex to the interior security adviser.

On 24 October 1936, the Internal Security Board approved an order according to which the Patrols should have a liaison agent with the Police Headquarters. José Asens, from CNT, agreed to this position and since then all searches and arrests were officially authorized and documented by him or by his secretary, Gutiérrez. Salvador González Albadalejo, representative of UGT in the committee, was in charge of inspecting the activities of all the Patrol sections. From November 1936 the violent actions of the Patrols were more limited. In the first half of 1937, it is difficult to distinguish genuine claims of abuse from propaganda. coming above all from the Communists.

On 17 December 1936, Generalitat president Lluís Companys reshuffled his cabinet. Communist Rafael Vidiella replaced POUM leader Andreu Nin as Minister of Justice. Artemi Aiguader continued as internal security advisor. Given the prevalence of CNT militants in the Patrols, the ERC and PSUC constantly complained about the sorry state of internal security in Catalonia and about the Patrolmen being incapable of maintaining public order. The continuous political friction between the parties was also transferred to the sessions of the Security Board. Eusebio Rodríguez Salas was appointed General Commissioner of Public Order. It was in these days that a "bread war" began to take place between the Ministry of Supplies, directed by Comorera, against the neighborhood supply committees, which until then controlled food supply in the neighborhoods. The management of supplies in Barcelona was in practice a covert political struggle between the Generalitat and the neighborhood committees created after the July 1936 revolution. The tension produced confrontations, and at the same time, repression, revenge, and settling accounts that tensed the atmosphere, in the midst of the suffering caused by the war. To stop this violence, it was decided to increase the number of Patrol cars in Barcelona to 1,500, a figure that was never met.

On 25 January 1937, there was a violent clash in the town of La Fatarella (Hechos de Fatarella), about 150 km west of Barcelona, where CNT militants tried to impose land collectivization. This led to a shootout in which a CNT Patrolman was killed. La Fatarella was attacked by additional Patrolmen and CNT militants, then by Assault Guards from Barcelona, and finally stormed by 60 men from the dead Patrolman's home neighborhood in Barcelona. Between 50 and 60 townspeople were shot dead and another 70 arrested.

These events made UGT abandon the organization of the Patrols. The discomfort was growing, the criticism in the PSUC, ERC, and UGT newspapers was constant. It coincided with the undisciplined attitude that UGT Patrolmen had displayed for a few weeks given that their party, PSUC, had already decided to put an end to the Patrols and establish a single security council in the hands of the Generalitat government. On 29 January, at the meeting of the Control Patrols, it was decided to replace the UGT Patrolmen with members of other forces.

During January and February there were discussions about the reorganization of public order in Catalonia. There were thousands of barracked Assault Guards and Civil Guards, who were seen by the revolutionaries as a threat to the revolution. But at the same time they were seen by the Republicans and Communists as a way to dispute power with the Patrols. On 15 February, the last meeting of the Internal Security Board took place; it was soon replaced by a new public order board. This change was made without any reaction by the CNT.

A decree on 4 March 1937 created the Internal Security Corps and dissolved the Patrols. The Corps was based on the Assault Guard, which was under the orders of the Generalitat, and the "Republican National Guard" (the name under which the Civil Guard was then known), which depended on the central government. As a security measure, members could not be affiliated with any union or political party. This ordinance was a measure that tried to put an end to the influence of the Control Patrols in the streets of Barcelona. At the same time, other decrees dissolved the defense councils of the municipalities, and ordered the withdrawal of the militias from the borders. It was a measure destined to end the revolution, of which the Patrols were an essential part. In any case, they ignored the order of their dissolution and remained armed until June 1937.

On 25 March 1937, Josep Tarradellas, Acting Minister of Internal Security, ordered the transfer of various detainees to the General Police Station of Public Order of the Government in the ex-monastery of San Elías and the other sections controlled by the Patrols. The direct control of the Generalitat continued to increase. The May Days events revealed the offensive by the Generalitat, with the support of militiamen from PSUC, UGT, and the Catalan state, against militiamen from CNT-FAI and POUM.

== Dissolution ==
The events of May marked the end of the patrols, since they were part of the revolutionary order that had prevailed in Barcelona since the first days of the war, which had been politically defeated in May. Some patrols sided with the CNT defense committees, the Libertarian Youth, the Friends of Durruti and the POUM armed groups.

On 4 June 1937, the order of final dissolution and delivery of all the weapons and identification plates of the patrols was published. Many former patrolmen went underground or marched to the front to avoid reprisals. On 9 June 1937, José Asens handed over the keys to the General Secretariat of Control Patrols and the rest of the barracks.

The role of the Patrols was assumed by the Military Information Service (SIM) of the Republic. The SIM reused most of the detention centers and put into practice more systematic and brutal methods of repression, not only against those suspected of being fascists but also against POUM militants and the anarchists.
