= Manuel Uribarri =

Republican soldier of the Spanish Civil War

Manuel Uribarri Barutell (25 May 1896, Burjassot–23 November 1962, Veracruz) was a Republican soldier of the Spanish Civil War.

At the outbreak of the Civil War, he was a captain of the Civil Guard in Valencia.

He led a column which left Valencia to capture the Balearic Islands for the Republicans, and took part in the capture of Formentera and Ibiza. He then took part in the Battle of Majorca.

He was made head of the Servicio de Información Militar, the Republican secret service. In 1938 left for France, declaring irreconcilable differences with Juan Negrín, the Republican president.

During the 1950s he tried to organise Republican exiles in Cuba, but was accused by other Republicans of desertion and misappropriation of funds. He died in exile in Mexico.

== Sources ==
- Domingo, Jorge (2009). El exilio republicano español en Cuba. Siglo XXI de España Editores. (Spanish) ISBN 9788432313875.
- Mainar Cabanes, Eladi (1998). De milicians a soldats: les columnes valencianes en la Guerra Civil (Catalan). Valencia: Universidad de Valencia. ISBN 9788437033495.
- Pagès, Pelai (2007). La guerra civil als Països Catalans, 1936- 1939 (Catalan). Valencia: Universidad de Valencia. ISBN 9788437067353.
- Viñas, Ángel (2008). El honor de la República: entre el acoso fascista, la hostilidad británica y la política de Stalin. Crítica. (Spanish) ISBN 978-84-7423-765-8.
