= Arconovaldo Bonaccorsi =

Italian Fascist soldier, politician and lawyer

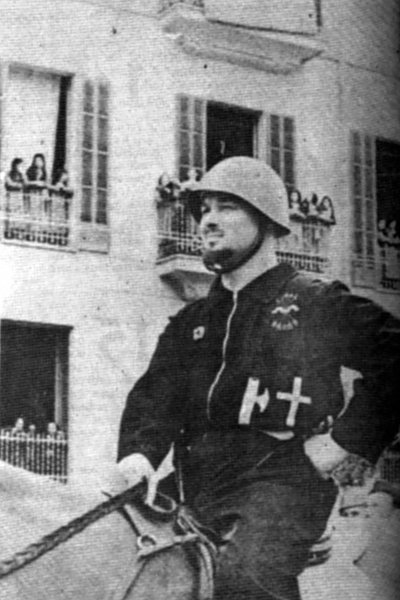
- Bonaccorsi in Spain during the Spanish Civil War
- Born: 22 August 1898; Bologna, Kingdom of Italy
- Died: 2 July 1962 (aged 63); Rome, Italian Republic
- Spouse: Unknown (m. 1930)
- Children: 3
- Military career
- Allegiance: Kingdom of Italy (1917–1941); Spanish State (1936–1939)
- Branch: (Kingdom of Italy) Italian Army; Blackshirts; Falangist Militia (Kingdom of Italy) Corpo Truppe Volontarie
- Service years: 1917–1941 (Combat); 1941-1946 (Prisoner of War}
- Rank: "General of the Black Shirts"
- Nickname: "Conte Rossi" (Count Rossi)
- Commands: Spanish Legion
- Conflicts: World War I: Italian front; White War (POW); March on Rome; Rivoluzione Fascista; Spanish Civil War: Battle of Mallorca; Battle of Porto Cristo; Pacification of Mallorca; World War II: East African campaign (POW); Italian invasion of British Somaliland
- Other work: Candidate for the Italian Social Movement in 1958 Italian general election

Arconovaldo Bonaccorsi (22 August 1898 – 2 July 1962) was an Italian Fascist soldier, politician and lawyer. Nicknamed "Conte Rossi", he played a prominent role in organising the Falangist conquest of the island of Mallorca during the Spanish Civil War.

== Biography ==
Arconovaldi Bonaccorsi received from Franco the "Gran Cruz militar de Espana" in 1937

Born in Bologna in 1898, Bonacorsi was a fanatical and idealistic fascist from the first moment he met Benito Mussolini after World War I. In 1922 he participated in the March on Rome as leader of the Fascists from Bologna. He graduated from the prestigious Universita di Bologna as an attorney in 1928, and soon began defending Fascists. In the early 1930s, he married and had three children.

His moment of glory came when Mussolini sent him to the Balearic Islands at the beginning of the Spanish Civil War. Arriving in Mallorca in August 1936, he became known as Conde Rossi("Count Rossi"), a name derived from his red beard. He was soon able to galvanize Nationalist forces on the island, leading them in a decisive victory over the Republicans at Porto Cristo (near Manacor).

Gilberto Oneto, an Italian journalist, wrote the following about Bonaccorsi and the Italians in Mallorca:

The nationalist revolt, suppressed in all of Catalonia, has happened successfully only in the island of Mallorca, but the Republicans are going to occupy it. The Italian government has a strong interest (not just strategic) in the Balearic Islands. Action is needed urgently. Need someone skilled enough, smart, determined and ruthless, and they remember the beefy bolognese squadrista Bonaccorsi. On 26 August 1936 he landed at Palma, calling himself Count Aldo Rossi ("Conde Rossi" or el Conde de Leon y Son Servera for Spanish). Resolutely takes command of the disorganized local nationalist forces, puts together 2,500/3,500 men between soldiers, legionaries of Tercio, volunteers, soldiers of the Guardia Civil, and Falange, and deals with strong decision against the Republican forces (6000 to 10,000 men) landed 10 days prior to Manacor, commanded by General Alberto Bayo, a theorist of guerrilla warfare and the future "ideal teacher" of Fidel Castro. With the support of the Italian air force, on 3 September Bonaccorsi defeats the Republicans who begin a disastrous retreat that ended on day 12. After the victory at Manacor, Bonaccorsi appoints himself military commander and inspector general of all the troops, creating the "Dragones de la Muerte". On 20 September with 500 men he landed in Ibiza, camouflaged. He also takes Formentera and Cabrera. Only Minorca remains in the hands of the Reds, protected by a secret agreement between Italy and England. Bonaccorsi then begins the "pacificacion" of Majorca, "cleaning" the island of Marxists. George Bernanos describes the nearly 3,000 executions of communists done by Bonaccorsi's Dragones de la Muerte, but he did not see the early violence (nearly 1,500 nationalists and priests killed in Majorca alone) of the Marxists done before the arrival of Bonaccorsi. In reality, the Bonaccorsi murders were only 700 (or 1500, as reported by the Italian consul in the Balearic islands), but this was enough to create huge complaints from France and England (even if in Majorca the civil war deaths were in percentage only one tenth of those in continental Spain). The diplomatic pressures were such that he was forced to return to Italy on 23 December 1936. Additionally, Mussolini did not like Bonaccorsi boasting that Italy was to remain forever in Majorca.

In Oneto's opinion, when Bonaccorsi first arrived on the island, the Italians only supported the possibility of promoting a semi-independent Mallorca (under Italian influence) in the event of Republican victory in the Spanish Civil War. But with Franco's victory, they understood that this project of "partial" independence was impossible.

Antifascist writers raised much criticism against Bonaccorsi. George Bernanos wrote about the Bonaccorsi-created Dragones de la Muerte, who were responsible for many murders. According to Bernanos's eyewitness report, Bonaccorsi was "well to the fore in all religious manifestations" and "was usually supported by a chaplain picked up on the spot, in army-breeches and top-boots, a white cross on his chest and pistols stuck in his belt." (Note: Bonaccorsi is described in Georges Bernanos's A Diary of My Times: "Of course the new-comer was neither a general nor a count, but an Italian official belonging to the Black Shirts. One morning we saw him disembark his scarlet racing-car. First he called on the military governor appointed by General Goded. A few days later Colonel Ramos Unamuno and his staff, commissioned by General Goded, fell in some doubt and Conde Rossi was placed in charge of the Phalange. In black robes, with a huge white cross on his chest, he tore round the villages, driving his racing-car himself; other cars, crammed with men armed to the teeth, strove to keep up with him in a cloud of dust. Accompanied by the alcalde and the ever pistol-armed priest Julián Adrover, Bonaccorsi, in a strange mixed jargon of Spanish, Italian, and Majorcan dialect, announced the 'Cruzada'... This gigantic brute asserted one day at the table of a distinguished lady of Palma—whilst wiping his fingers on the tablecloth—that he required at least 'one woman per day'. But the particular mission entrusted him was marvelously suited to his gifts: the organizing of terrorism. From that time, every night, gangs of his own recruiting commenced operations in the villages and in the very suburbs of Palma."<)

The clergy of Mallorca, on the other hand, were very grateful to Bonaccorsi, and the Archbishop of the Balearic Islands, José Miralles y Sbert, often praised him. Francisco Franco awarded him the Spanish Grand Cross of Military Merit with Red Decoration. The Correo de Majorca, the local newspaper, wrote gratefully in February 1937 as a last salute that "we will forever remember your heroism and will give to our descendants the memory of what you did for us." Furthermore, Bonaccorsi was celebrated in ceremonies by many civilians of Mallorca.

On 14 December 1936, shortly after Bonaccorsi captured Ibiza with a force of 500 Falangists, British Foreign Secretary Anthony Eden wrote a memorandum which highlighted the possibility of Italy creating a protectorate in Mallorca. Immense pressure was put on Mussolini to remove Bonaccorsi from the Balearics; consequently, in February 1937, he was promoted to Console delle Milizie fasciste ("General of the Blackshirts") and sent to the Málaga front with the Corpo Truppe Volontari. He never returned to Mallorca. Later, he was sent to Italian Ethiopia, where he complained to Mussolini about the Italian Empire's dire lack of preparedness in case of war.

During World War II, Bonaccorsi participated in the 1940 conquest of British Somaliland as military commander of the Reparto Speciale Autonomo della Milizia fascista ("Autonomous Special Unit of the Fascist Militia"), a 300-man commando unit.

Finally, he was a prisoner of war from 1941 to 1946; after the war, he resumed his legal and political activities and defended German General Otto Wagener, who was sentenced to 15 years in prison for atrocities he had committed in Rhodes during World War II.

In 1949 Bonaccorsi created the Associazione Nazionale Combattenti Italiani di Spagna ("National Association of Italian Combatants in Spain"; ANCIS), and in the same year applied for membership in the neofascist political party Movimento Sociale Italiano ("Italian Social Movement"; MSI).

Bonaccorsi was a candidate for the MSI in 1958. He died following surgical complications in 1962 in Rome. The Italian newspaper Il Secolo d'Italia praised him in a funeral article, which noted that he was one of the few military commanders who had received medals for combat valour from three countries (Italy, Spain, and Germany).

== Medals and decorations ==
Bonaccorsi received four medals of honour for combat in 1936 Spain:

Silver Medal of Military Valor (Medaglia d'argento al valor militare)

Military Order of Savoy (Cavaliere dell´Ordine militare di Savoia)

German Iron Cross (Croce di Ferro di I classe)

Spanish Grand Cross of Military Merit with Red Decoration (Gran Croce militare spagnola)

Francisco Franco in 1937 gave him the Grand Cross of Military Merit with Red Decoration.

He was welcomed and praised again in 1957 by Franco, receiving the Spanish nickname Cruzado en camisa negra (blackshirt crusader).

== See also ==
- Italian occupation of Mallorca
- Battle of Mallorca

== Bibliography ==
- Massot, Josep. Vida i miracles del Conde Rossi Editorial Serrador. Barcelona, 1988
