= Alberto Bayo =

Cuban military commander

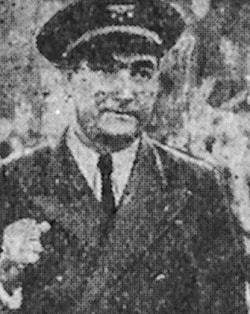
- Alberto Bayo
- Born: 27 March 1892; Camagüey, Cuba
- Died: 4 August 1967 (aged 75); Havana, Cuba
- Military career
- Allegiance: Spanish Republic; Cuba
- Branch: Spanish Air Force; Spanish Legion; Spanish Republican Air Force; Cuban Armed Forces
- Rank: General
- Conflicts: Rif War; Spanish Civil War; Cuban Revolution
- Other work: Poet and essayist

Alberto Bayo y Giroud (27 March 1892 – 4 August 1967) was a Cuban military commander of the Republican faction during the Spanish Civil War. His most significant action during the war was the attempted invasion of the Nationalist-held islands of Ibiza and Mallorca at the Battle of Majorca. He was also a poet and essayist.

== Biography ==
He was born in Cuba and studied in the United States and Spain. In his youth he joined the Spanish Military Aviation. He had his first flight in 1916. He was expelled from the Aviation after taking part in a duel. He was then forced to join the Spanish Legion in 1924, and participated in the Rif War, in which he stayed for two years as a company commander. In 1925 he was seriously wounded in the groin, spending a year in recovery. In 1926 he requested to return to Africa, and was assigned the 3rd battalion of the Mehal-la de Gómara – which was part of General Capaz's troops – taking part in heavy fighting until 1927.

He returned to the air force during the Second Spanish Republic and was stationed in administrative posts, but he was not promoted.

He was appointed as the 2nd Chief of Staff of the V Army Corps for the Battle of Brunete, Modesto, but the commander of the unit opposed this and Bayo was relieved. He was successively promoted to Commander and Lieutenant Colonel. He was going to be in charge of preparing a guerrilla column in the Sierra de Guadarrama, but finally the project was not carried out and Bayo spent most of the contest as a military attaché in the Ministry of War.

After that war was lost, Bayo had a furniture factory in Mexico, and is reported to have been an instructor at the Military Academy of Guadalajara. Bayo had contact in Mexico with prominent Latin American revolutionaries, and was an associate and mentor of some, including Ernesto Che Guevara and Fidel Castro. He joined the guerrillas as an advisor and participated in the Cuban Revolution. There he maintained a close friendship with Castro and Che Guevara. While it is not known if he continued contact with Soviet agents such as "Comandante Carlos Contreras" (Vittorio Vidali), both were present in Mexico at the same period.

== Death ==
Alberto Bayo died a General of the Cuban Armed Forces.

== Bayo as author and poet ==
- Cualquier cosilla (poetry), Spain, 1911
- Mis cantos de aspirante (poetry), Spain, 1911
- Cadetadas (poetry), Spain, 1912
- Canciones del Alkázar (poetry), Spain, 1914
- Juan de Juanes (novel), Spain, 1926
- Uncida al yugo (novel), Spain, 1926
- Dos años en Gomara, Spain, 1928
- La guerra será de los guerrilleros, Spain, 1937
- El tenorio laico (poetry), Spain, 1938
- Mi desembarco en Mallorca, Mexico, 1944
- Tempestad en el Caribe, Mexico, 1950
- Cámara, México (history), 1951
- El caballero de los tristes destinos (capitán Alonso de Ojeda), México, 1953
- Magallanes, el hombre más audaz de la tierra, Mexico, 1953
- 150 preguntas a un guerrillero, Mexico, 1955
- Fidel te espera en la Sierra (poetry), Mexico, 1958
- Mis versos de rebeldía, Mexico, 1958
- Sangre en Cuba (poetry), Mexico, 1958
- Mi aporte a la revolución cubana, 1960
- El tenorio cubano (poetry), 1960
- Versos revolucionarios, 130 pp, 1960
- Mis versos, 223 pp, 1965
