= Italian occupation of Mallorca =

Part of the Fascist Italian intervention in the Spanish Civil War

- Italian-occupied territory
- 1936–1939
- Flag Coat of arms

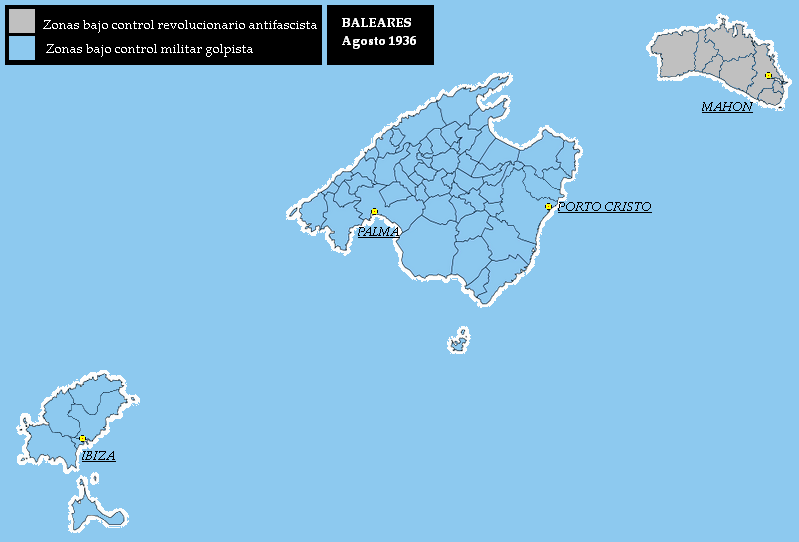
- The Balearic Islands during the Spanish Civil War. Mallorca is the large central island. Light blue: Italian / Spanish Nationalist-occupied territory. Grey: Spanish Republican-occupied territory.
- Capital: Palma
- Government
  - Type: Occupation
- Proconsul
  - 1936: Arconovaldo Bonaccorsi
- Historical era: Interwar period
  - Established: 1936
  - Disestablished: 1939
Preceded by	Succeeded by
Second Spanish Republic	Francoist Spain

The Italian occupation of Mallorca lasted throughout the Spanish Civil War. Italy intervened in the war with the intention of expanding the Fascist sphere of influence to Spain. The Italians sought to control the Balearic Islands because of their strategic position, from which they could disrupt lines of communication between France and its North African colonies, and between British Gibraltar and Malta. Italian flags were flown over the island. Italian forces dominated Mallorca, with Italians openly manning the airfields at Alcúdia and Palma, as well as Italian warships being based in the harbour of Palma.

Prior to open intervention by Italy, Benito Mussolini authorized "volunteers" to go to Spain. This resulted in the seizure of the largest Balearic island of Mallorca by a force under Fascist Blackshirt leader Arconovaldo Bonaccorsi (also known as "Count Rossi"), who was sent to Mallorca to act as Italian proconsul in the Balearics. Bonaccorsi proclaimed that Italy would occupy the island in perpetuity and initiated a brutal reign of terror, arranging the murder of 3,000 accused Communists, and emptying Mallorca's prisons by having all prisoners shot. In the aftermath of the Battle of Mallorca, Bonaccorsi renamed the main street of Palma de Mallorca Via Roma, and adorned it with statues of Roman eagles. Bonaccorsi was later rewarded by Italy for his activity in Mallorca.

Italian forces launched air raids from Mallorca against Republican-held cities in mainland Spain. Initially Mussolini only authorized a weak force of Italian bomber aircraft to be based in Mallorca in 1936 to avoid antagonizing Britain and France. However, the weak response by Britain and France to Italy's actions in the region encouraged Mussolini to deploy twelve more bombers to Mallorca, including one aircraft flown by his son, Bruno Mussolini. By January 1938, Mussolini had doubled the number of bombers stationed in the Balearics and increased bomber attacks on shipping headed to support Spanish Republican forces. The buildup of Italian bomber aircraft on the island's airfields and increased Italian air attacks on Republican-held ports and shipping headed to Republican ports was viewed by France as provocative.

According to historian Manuel Aguilera, in 1937 the desperate Republican government contacted Italian diplomats through José Chapiro to negotiate for Italy's neutrality in the war. The Italian conditions were:

- Spanish Morocco
- 100 million dollars to cover Italian expenses in the war
- The colonization of the Balearic Islands with 100,000 Italians and a similar quantity in Peninsular Spain, plus one or two air bases.

This last condition was the most acceptable for Luis Araquistáin, the Republic's ambassador to France. In 1950, former minister Federica Montseny remembered that the government evaluated offering the Balearic Islands or the Canary Islands to Nazi Germany.

In 1938, the Italian Ministry of Finance bought a big estate in the S'Albufera area of Mallorca through a proxy society, Celulosa Hispánica.

Once the Spanish Nationalists won the civil war in 1939, Mussolini withdrew all Italian forces from Spain. In this period Italy also invaded Albania in response to the sudden Nazi occupation of Czechoslovakia.
