= Francesc Isgleas =

Catalan anarcho-syndicalist (1892–1977)

Francesc Isgleas i Piarnau

Minister of Defence of Catalunya
- In office 17 December 1936 – 5 May 1937
- President: Lluis Companys
- Preceded by: Felip Díaz i Sandino

Personal details
- Born: 16 February 1892 Sant Feliu de Guíxols, Baix Empordà, Catalunya
- Died: 14 February 1977 (aged 84) Barcelona, Catalunya
- Citizenship: Spain
- Party: CNT

Francesc Isgleas i Piarnau (Sant Feliu de Guíxols, 16 February 1892 - Barcelona, 14 February 1977) was a Catalan anarcho-syndicalist.

== Biography ==
He worked in the cork industry. In May 1921 he was elected to the committee of the Regional Confederation of Labor of Catalunya (CRTC), and held the position of secretary of the Girona Regional Federation. Representing the Unified Union of Sant Feliu de Guíxols, he participated in the Regional Conference of Trade Unions of Catalunya held in Blanes in July 1922). He was forced into exile during the dictatorship of Primo de Rivera.

With the proclamation of the Second Spanish Republic, he returned to Catalunya, where he represented the Unified Union of Sant Feliu de Guíxols at the Regional Conference of Trade Unions, held in Barcelona on 31 May and 1 June 1931. Representing the Surotapers Union of Cassà de la Selva and others in Figueres, La Bisbal, Llagostera, Olot, Palamós and Salt, he attended the third confederal Congress of the CNT (Madrid, 10–16 June 1931), where he was elected to chair the first session.

At the outbreak of the Spanish Civil War, he acted as Minister of Defense of the Generalitat de Catalunya from December 1936 to May 1937. He later took part in the constitution of the Spanish Libertarian Movement, formed in Paris in February 1939.

At the end of the war he went into exile in France, and in 1942 was interned in the concentration camps of Vernet and Djelfa. At the end of World War II he settled in Paris and maintained some activity. In 1976 he returned from exile to try to reorganize the CNT, but died shortly afterwards.

== See also ==
- Anarchism in Spain
