= Servicio de Información Militar =

Political police of the Spanish Republican Armed Forces

- Servicio de Información Militar (SIM)

Agency overview
- Formed: August 9, 1937; 89 years ago
- Preceding agency: Various agencies (see text)
- Dissolved: 29 March 1939
- Superseding agency: Servicio de Información del Alto Estado Mayor (SIAEM) Brigada Político-Social (BPS)
- Type: Military intelligence agency
- Jurisdiction: Spanish Republic
- Headquarters: Madrid, Barcelona and Valencia, Spain
- Agency executive: Ángel Díaz Baza (first), Director
- Parent agency: Ministry of Defense

The Servicio de Información Militar (Military Information Service) or SIM was the secret police of the Spanish Republican Armed Forces from August 1937 to the end of the Spanish Civil War.

== History ==
=== Background ===
In a speech delivered on 28 November 1932, at the Madrid Ateneo, the poet Miguel de Unamuno, one of the founding fathers of the Second Spanish Republic, angrily denounced the Red Terror by the Republican forces: "Even the Inquisition was limited by certain legal guarantees. But now we have something worse: a police force which is grounded only on a general sense of panic and on the invention of non-existent dangers to cover up this over-stepping of the law."

In 1937 there were nine intelligence and counter-intelligence organizations with their own networks of agents in the Republican held zone: the communist held DEDIDE (Departamento Especial de Información del Estado), the SIEP (Servicio Especial de Información Periferico), the army’s secret service, the Carabineros’ secret service, the foreign ministry’s, the Generalitat’s, etc. Even, the International Brigades had its own intelligence service run by agents of the Soviet NKVD and GRU. This organizations held prisoners in its own secret prisons, named "Checas" after the Cheka Soviet organization.

Owing to the confusion and often arbitrary arrests, the Republican minister of Defense, Indalecio Prieto decided to reorganize the intelligence services in order to increase the control of the central government.

=== Establishment of the SIM ===
On August 9, 1937, Prieto decided to create a new secret service, the Servicio de Información Militar or SIM, merging all the intelligence services inside the Republican zone. The main goals of the SIM were to combat the Nationalists' intelligence service, the SIPM (Servicio de Información y Policía Militar), to neutralize the Fifth Column and to restrict the activity of the "uncontrollables". Nevertheless, it was also used by the PCE, to persecute its political enemies. It had 6,000 agents in Madrid alone and a budget of 22 million pesetas. It was organized into six military sections and five civilian sections.

The SIM aided to stop the atrocities of the "uncontrollables" (agents of the SIM protected 2,000 priests who were conducting private religious services in Barcelona in 1938) and destroyed many networks of the Fifth Column (Concepción, Circulo Azul, Capitán Mora, Cruces de Fuego, etc.). In 1938, the SIM announced that it had uncovered a clandestine Falange in Catalonia, with the resulting arrest of 3,500 persons.

Nevertheless, the SIM had an unenviable reputation among both the Spanish Republican Armed Forces and the Spanish people. They had clandestine prisons in Madrid and Barcelona, routinely used torture to obtain confessions (beatings, mock executions, disorientation and sensory-deprivation techniques) and routinely carried out extrajudicial executions of suspects. Moreover, in February 1938 summary military tribunals were established which worked without any legal guarantees for the accused. According to Gabriel Jackson, the SIM carried out around 1,000 executions.

In March 1939, the head of the SIM in Madrid supported Casado's coup. With the collapse of the Second Spanish Republic and the end of the war, the SIM was disbanded.

== Members ==
- Hamish Fraser
- Artur London
- Erich Mielke
- Manuel Uribarri
- Wilhelm Zaisser

== In popular culture ==
- Robert Jordan, hero of Ernest Hemingway's 1940 novel For Whom the Bell Tolls, carries a dispatch with an SIM stamp authorizing his mission to dynamite a bridge. The dispatch is taken by Andrés to the Republic's military headquarters Comandancia (Chapters 36 & 42).

== Bibliography ==
- Beevor, Antony. The battle for Spain. The Spanish civil war, 1936-1939. Penguin Books. 2006. London. ISBN 978-0-14-303765-1.
- Jackson, Gabriel. The Spanish Republic and the Civil War, 1931-1939. Princeton University Press. 1967. Princeton. ISBN 978-0-691-00757-1
- Thomas, Hugh. The Spanish Civil War. Penguin Books. 2001. London. ISBN 978-0-14-101161-5
