= Luis García Ruiz =

Spanish General

Luís García Ruíz
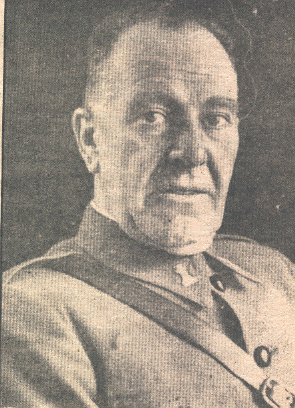

Civil Governor of Balearic Islands
- In office July 19, 1936 – August 31, 1936
- Preceded by: Antonio Espina García
- Succeeded by: Antonio Álvarez-Ossorio Barrientos

Captain General of Balearic Islands
- In office September 18, 1936 – September 20, 1936
- Preceded by: Aurelio Díaz de Freijo Durá
- Succeeded by: Trinidad Benjumeda del Rey

Personal details
- Born: March 8, 1877 Málaga, Spain
- Died: September 9, 1949 (aged 72) Palma de Mallorca, Spain
- Children: 6
- Occupation: Military
- Military career
- Allegiance: Spain; Spain Nationalist faction Spanish Republic
- Branch: Engineering
- Service years: 1901–1949
- Rank: Lieutenant Colonel - Brigadier General
- Conflict: Spanish Civil War: Battle of Mallorca

Luis García Ruiz (March 8, 1877 in Màlaga – September 9, 1949 in Palma) was a Spanish army general who took part in the military uprising against the Second Republic in July 1936.

Son of a colonel in the infantry branch, he finished his secondary school studies in the Philippines. In 1895, he joined the Engineering Corps in the General Military Academy at Guadalajara. In 1901, he was sent to Mallorca as a lieutenant, and in November 1907, he married Isabel Rosselló Alemany whom he had six children with. Among his children was Antoni García Ruiz i Rosselló, who was a famous Mallorcan architect and served as a civil governor. Antoni died in 2003.

In 1917, Luis succeeded Eusebi Estada i Sureda as the manager for the railway project which connected major cities and towns in Mallorca such as Palma, Llucmajor and Campos. He was also involved in the development of the railway connecting Palma with its Port.

As a military engineer, he studied defense strategies and designed Artillery batteries throughout the island. He was a military assistant to Spanish general Valeriano Weyler and also served 3 years in Mahón.

In 1933, he was appointed military commander of the Balearic Islands and subsequently began working together with Francisco Franco. A year later, in 1934, a state of war was declared leading to the disbanding of the Palma Town Hall and dismissal of the Mayor of Palma, Emili Darder. During his term, he banned the Himno de Riego from being played.

== Civil War ==
During the outbreak of the Spanish Civil War, García Ruiz was an engineer officer with the rank of lieutenant colonel. On the 19th of July, General Manuel Goded appointed him to the rank of civil governor. The immediate measures that were taken included the repression of the Spanish General Strike, the removal of administrative fees received by municipalities, the dismissal of disloyal civil servants and the closure of unions and parties. Within 24 hours new town mayors were appointed under the condition that they remained apolitical. These measures led to his encounter with Mallorca's military commander, Colonel Aurelio Días de Freijo. Together with other military leaders and against the advice of Aurelio Días de Freijo, he imprisoned Carlos Soto Romero, an emissary sent from the Generalitat de Catalunya. On the evening of 30 August 1936, military leaders in Mallorca appointed him as head of operations and troop commander in Manacor, relieving Emilio Ramos Unamuno from his duties. In the process, his role as Civil Governor was handed over to Antonio Álvarez-Ossorio, the head of the Civil Guard. In September, he temporarily took over command as Captain General for the Balearic Islands. Shortly after, he was promoted to Colonel and was assigned to mainland Spain as the Engineering commander. He campaigned across the north of Spain, from Álava to Gijón and Avilés. At Bilbao, he was awarded the city's gold medal. Following the campaign, he was appointed as commander general for Engineering and moved to the south of the country, under direct orders from general Gonzalo Queipo de Llano.

== Honours ==
On 21 December 1936, the Manacor town council named Luis García Ruiz as the town's adopted son. Following the end of the civil war, he was promoted to general based on his performance, ranking 8th. On 9 May 1939, his services led the city council of Palma to name him the adopted son of the island of Mallorca. From August 1940 to March 1942, he was the military governor for Mallorca. After the war, he joined the Balearic Chess Federation and chaired the Mallorcan Chess Club. In 1979, the Palma City Council dedicated the Porta des Camp plaza to him.

On 4 May 2009, the Manacor town hall decided to withdraw García Ruiz's and Franco's titles as adopted sons.
