= War Industries Commission =

- Comissió d'Indústries de Guerra
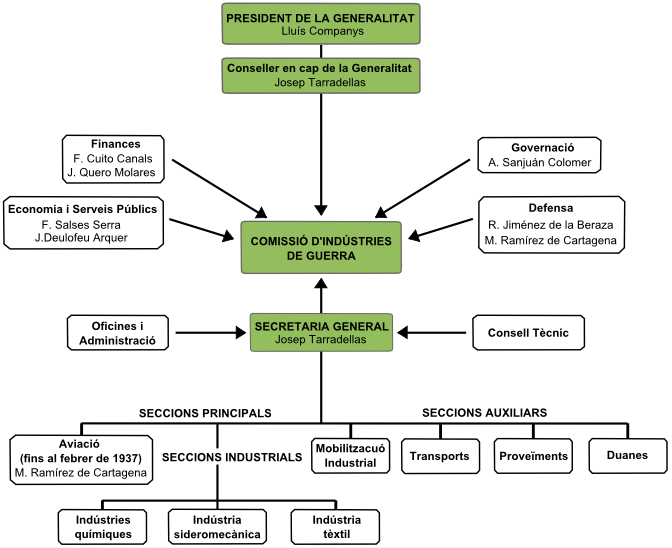
- Organizational chart of the War Industries Commission.
- Abbreviation: CIG
- Established: 7 August 1936; 90 years ago
- Dissolved: 11 August 1938; 88 years ago
- Members: c. 80,000
- Secretary General: Josep Tarradellas
- Parent organization: Generalitat de Catalunya

The War Industries Commission (Catalan: Comissió d'Indústries de Guerra, CIG) was a body set up by the Generalitat de Catalunya on 7 August 1936 with the aim of organizing and coordinating the efforts of all production facilities to supply armaments to the republican forces during the Spanish Civil War. After reducing its powers in the wake of the May Days, the Commission remained operational in Catalonia until 11 August 1938, when it was completely taken over by the republican government.

In 1936, Catalonia had virtually no war industry. With the outbreak of the Spanish Civil War, some workshops and factories began to autonomously produce weapons. The effort, however, in most cases was inefficient and sterile. To fix this, the CIG was created, headed by the Minister of Finance Josep Tarradellas, with the aim of channeling this push into something effective. The artisanal production of weapons was banned, the production of the converted industries was regulated and new military industrial infrastructure was constructed. On a large scale, the commission was organized into main sections, dedicated directly to the production of weapons or equipment, and auxiliary sections, dedicated to obtaining raw materials, semi-finished products or machinery abroad.

The results of the War Industries Commission varied according to the factories, some achieving very satisfactory productions and others failing to mass-produce. In total, it is estimated that between 50,000 and 80,000 people worked in the CIG as a whole, between direct and auxiliary employment, in about 500 workshops and factories. With the republican appropriation of the industry in 1937, the production decayed noticeably.

== History ==
On 17 July 1936, the Spanish Civil War began and republicans defeated the nationalist uprising in Catalonia. But in Catalan territory there were practically no war industries, and many workers, aware of the needs of the front and driven by the revolutionary spirit of the time, decided on their own initiative to start making weapons and equipment for the soldiers. This rapid spontaneity, however, had very low efficiency. In order to make these initiatives effective, the CIG was created on 7 August 1936, which became effective by decree of the Generalitat, on 12 August.

The War Industries Commission of Catalonia was headed by a Council of War Industries, made up of 8 men. The Councilors of War Industries were in charge of different tasks and were appointed by the Councilors of the Generalitat. The distribution was as follows:

- General Secretary: Josep Tarradellas. Responsible for the War Industries Commission from inception to cessation.
- Defense: Ricardo Jiménez de la Beraza and Miguel Ramírez de Cartagena Marcaida. The first was an artillery soldier and was a key part of the organization of the commission, he devoted himself to the intervention of the Republican government. Miguel Ramírez was an aviation commander and was made responsible for the aviation section of the commission until he was arrested in Valencia in June 1937.
- Economy and Public Services: Francesc Salsas Serra, director of the CROS of Lleida, and Joan Deulofeu i Arquer, engineer and mayor of Barcelona between 1934 and 1936.
- Finance: Ferran Cuito Canals, engineer and politician, and Josep Quero i Molares, jurist and politician.
- Governance: Alfred San Juan i Colomer, military pilot and professor of aeronautics.

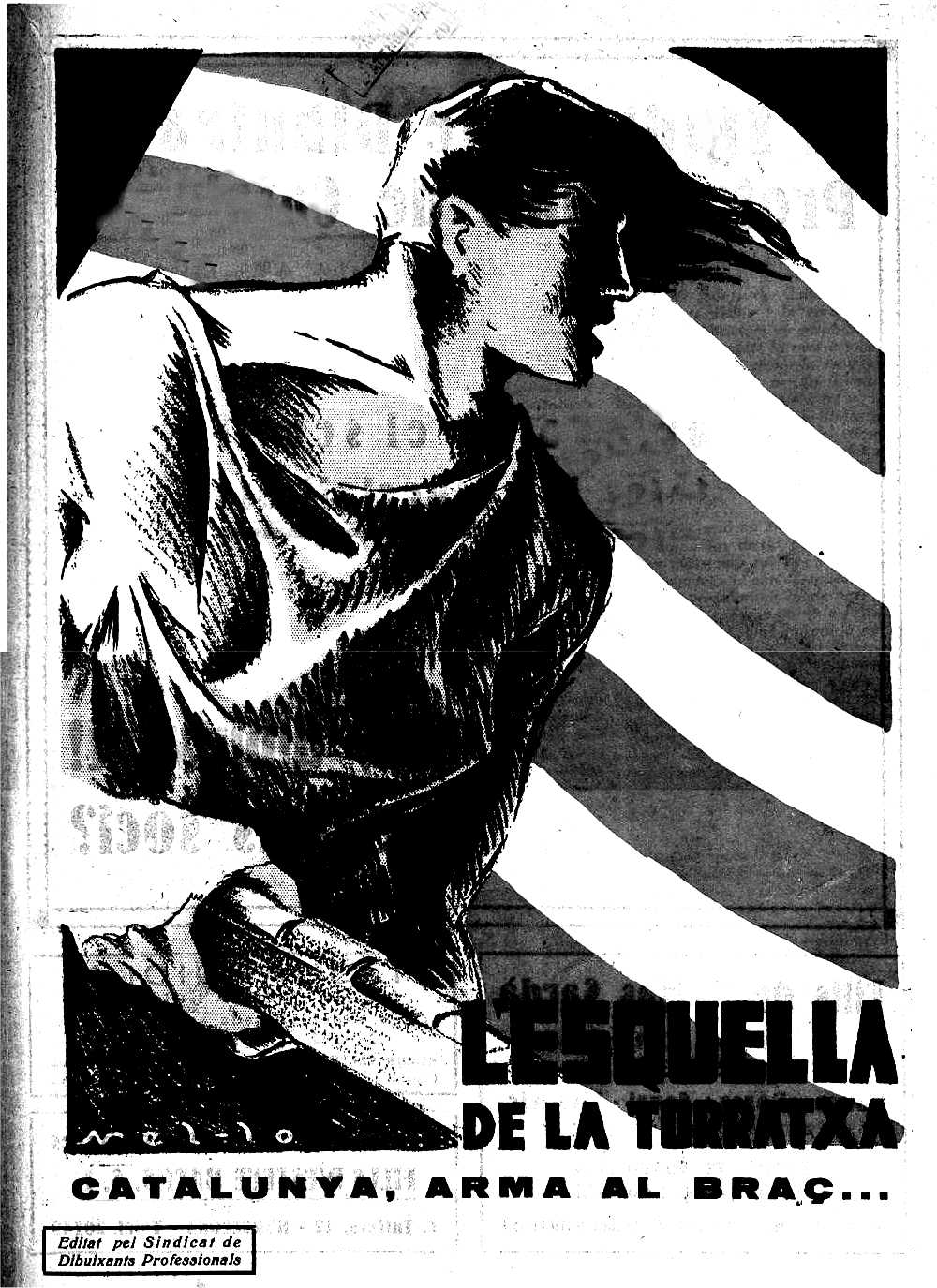
Drawing of L'Esquella de la Torratxa of 13 November 1936 with the motto: Catalonia, weapon in arm...

In addition, the performance of Eugenio Vallejo is very remarkable, forming part of the commission as a representative of the Minister of Economy. A trade unionist for the CNT, he was an important part of resolving conflicts with workers.

The work of the CIG was divided into three sections: aviation, iron and steel and chemistry. Their managers, respectively, were Miguel Ramírez de Cartagena, Eugenio Vallejo and Francesc Salsas Serra (who left the position in February 1937).

This council, where all the political factions of Catalonia were represented, was in constant conflict with the republican government. With the May Events the Council changed in line with political changes and the will of the state to deal with military production increased.

The first maneuver of the Republic was the creation of the Armaments Undersecretariat, which assumed part of the powers of the CIG. This assumption of powers continued in October 1937, when the Republic intervened in all the collectivized factories and workshops that were not owned by the Generalitat. With this, the dense tissue that had formed was torn. In some things the Undersecretariat acted correctly, like in the suspension of the production of the armored trucks, that served little in combat cross-country. But the contempt shown for the production that was carried out was a blow to the workers who did not produce again at the same speed or with the same enthusiasm.

Finally on 11 August 1938, by decree, despite the opposition of the Generalitat and the fact that there was no clear reason, the 15 remaining CIG factories would passed to the jurisdiction and direction of the Undersecretariat of Spanish Armaments and Ammunition.

== The factories ==
The CIG organized a dense industrial network of five hundred workshops and factories in addition to laboratories all over the Catalan territory, regardless of which were owned by Spain. The companies under the control of the CIG were expropriated, intervened or coordinated, as the case may be and in agreement with the Workers' Control Committee. The work of the CIG focused mainly on the metallurgical and chemical fields.

Overall, the most successful industrial reconversions were those that went from producing stationery, bicycles and cosmetics to manufacturing cartridges. Many of the factories and workshops in one year reached manufacturing quotas of up to 1 million cartridges per month. The biggest problems the commission had to face were the irregularity of the raw material and the lack of foreign exchange.

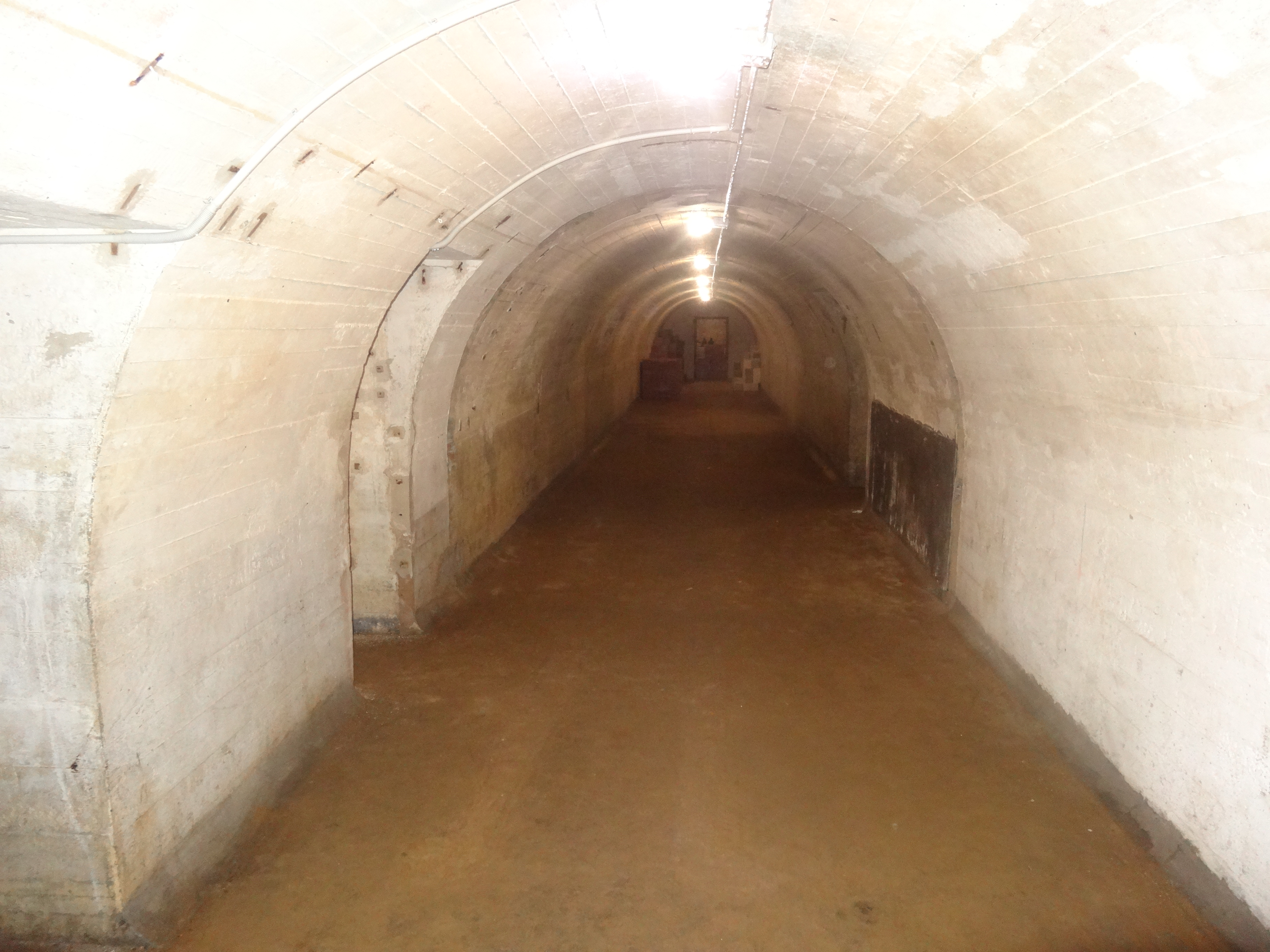
The Catalan war industry was often the target of fascist bombings. An air raid shelter was built in the Elizalde factory to protect itself.

The factories involved by the CIG, and the number of workers who worked there, in Barcelona were: Elizalde (400 workers), Foret (440), Fàbrica Riviere (1,200), Maquinista Terrestre i Marítima (1,279), Material para Ferrocarriles and Construction (1,500) and Hispano-Suiza (1,500). In the rest of Catalonia, the Electrochemistry of Flix (650), Pirelli (1,500) and the Ercros of Lleida took part.

The factories and workshops coordinated by the CIG were many more. With more than 200 workers in Barcelona there were: Orfeó Sincrònic (212), Compañía del Gramófono Odeón (223), Altos Hornos de Cataluña (241), Industrias Lacambra (262), Labora Talleres Confederales no. 1 (294) and Metales y Platería Ribera (508). In the rest of Catalonia, with more than 200 workers, the following companies were coordinated: Comité Metalúrgico de Torelló (312), Casa Bacas (332), Casa Serra (385) and Talleres G. de Andreis (631).

=== The 15 CIG factories ===
The companies directly and totally controlled by the CIG, some created and others confiscated, but all owned by the Generalitat, were the following 15 factories:

- Factory number 1 (F-1). The main activity was the manufacture of octanol. Installed in July 1936 in Badalona, it was formed in part by the company Unión Española de Explosivos, at 355 Eduard Maristany Street. One of the main efforts of the War Industry Commission was to be able to manufacture tetraethyllead, a compound needed to ethylate gasoline and make it more suitable for aviation engines. On 7 August 1936, a request was made to the Laboratory of Organic Chemistry of the School of Industrial Engineers of Barcelona to try to get dibromine-1-2-ethane, which they later obtained. Dibromo-1-2-ethane must be mixed with lead tetraethylate and monochloronaphthalene to obtain octanol, also called ethyl fluid, which was consumed by fighter jets of the time as an anti-detonator, improving its performance. 21 workers worked there and the production was good. As of 31 October 1937, 1,293.90 kg of octanol (1,146 liters), 4,342.5 kg of ethyl chloride, and 1,110.175 kg of pure tetraethyllead were produced.
- Factory number 2 (F-2). Its activity focused on making natamite, gunpowder and wicks. Production began in November 1936, it was on Carrer Parcerisa in Barcelona next to l'Hospitalet. It was difficult to start production, there was a lack of furniture and it was something never made in Catalonia before. In the first month, 3,000 kg of natamite was produced, but it increased month by month, and in October 1937, 38,000 kg were processed. In addition, it also made gunpowder for rifles and corrected gunpowder in poor condition from outside Catalonia. In total there were about 400 workers and they came to produce close to 300,000 kg of natamite, 20,000 kg of gunpowder, 100,000 kg of loads and 800,000 meters of wick. The F-2 was subdivided into 7 sections:
1. Preparation of cotton for nitrating.
2. Nitration of cotton.
3. Refining of gunpowder cotton.
4. Production of different powders, for cannon, rifle, mortar ...
5. Manufacture of natamite.
6. Preparation of loads.
7. Making wicks.

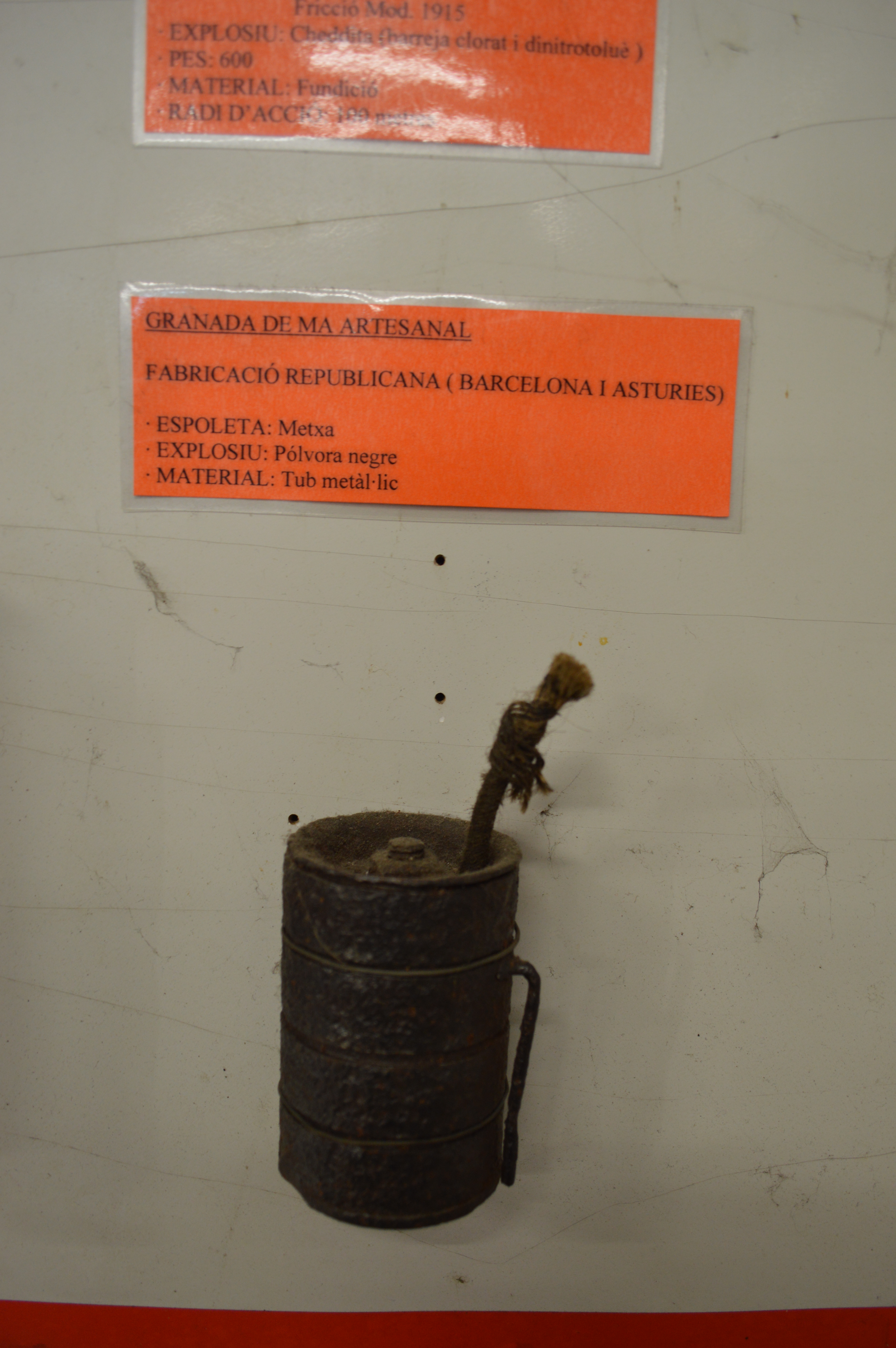
Handmade grenade loaded with black powder and wick for lighting, possibly made in Catalonia.

- Factory number 3 (F-3). It mainly manufactured trinitrotoluene (TNT). It began operating in August 1936, located on Carrer Niño (now Carrer de Guardiola i Feliu) in Sant Andreu. It worked closely with the F-9; in both cases, due to low protection measures, there were accidents with deaths and injuries. It initially produced 4,000 kg of ammonium trinitrotoluol and tetralite and increased to 56,000 kg in April 1937. Its 150 workers also produced new products such as dinitronaphthalene, mononitronaphthalene, picric acid or trinitrotoluol.
- Factory number 4 (F-4). Its main activity was the production of cellulose from esparto fiber, cheaper than cotton, to later make trilite or gunpowder. The CIG took control of the company Papelera del Fluvià S.A. at the end of 1936 and began to produce, with 224 workers, after a remodeling. It was installed in Can Porxas, in la Canya in Olot.
- Factory number 5 (F-5). Intended for the production of toxic gases, it was an adaptation of a textile dye factory located in the Queralbs forge, in Ripollès. It was run by a chemist, a high school teacher named Francesc Sánchez Mur and employed 199 people. It was the only attempt to collaborate with a factory outside Catalonia, in La Marañosa, near Madrid, which had to stop and move due to its proximity to the front. There were discrepancies between Francesc Sánchez and the director of La Marañosa, as the latter wanted to take the Madrid workers to the F-5 arguing that unskilled workers could not produce the material in time to take part in the war. It failed to produce toxic gases in series. In this case, unlike the others, a certain secrecy was demanded about the nature of what was done inside the factory.
- Factory number 6 (F-6). Like the F-5, it sought to produce toxic substances. Newly created, it was located in the Mambla of Orís, Torelló (Osona). Also directed by Sánchez Mur, it was shut down without producing anything.
- Factory number 7 (F-7). Dedicated to the production of cartridges and artillery pieces (mortars). Located on Carrer Dènia in Sarrià-Sant Gervasi. It was created by the CIG. Together with the F-12, of production capacity and similar characteristics, they were of the fastest and most effective. Its 186 workers produced 9 million cartridges in one month.
- Factory number 8 (F-8). Initially intended for the production of lighting/ground rockets and aviation signals, later its production was expanded to bombs. Despite the rudimentary facilities, it began operating in December 1936 and in June 1937 also started a line of pumps. It was located in L'Hospitalet de Llobregat, in the neighborhood of La Torrassa. With 25 workers, it produced 8,945 illumination rockets, 1,500 signal rockets and 7,179 bombs until the 31 October 1937.
- Factory number 9 (F-9). It was in charge of loading grenades and working in conjunction with the F-3. It was located on Carrer Llull in Poblenou. By October 1937 more than 2,000,000 grenades had been loaded and there were 2,000,000 more unloaded carcasses in the warehouse; to make them 4,000 tons of steel casting were needed. A total of 142 workers worked there. The assembly, which consisted of 23 pieces, was complicated and dangerous and caused a total between September 36 and March 38 of 8 dead and 7 wounded.
- Factory number 10 (F-10). It was divided into two facilities. Installation nº1 was located in Ca l'Aranyó, in Cardona (Bages). It extracted potassium chlorate. Installation nº2 was in the Súria Mines (Bages) and extracted bromine. Productions were very scarce despite employing 50 workers.

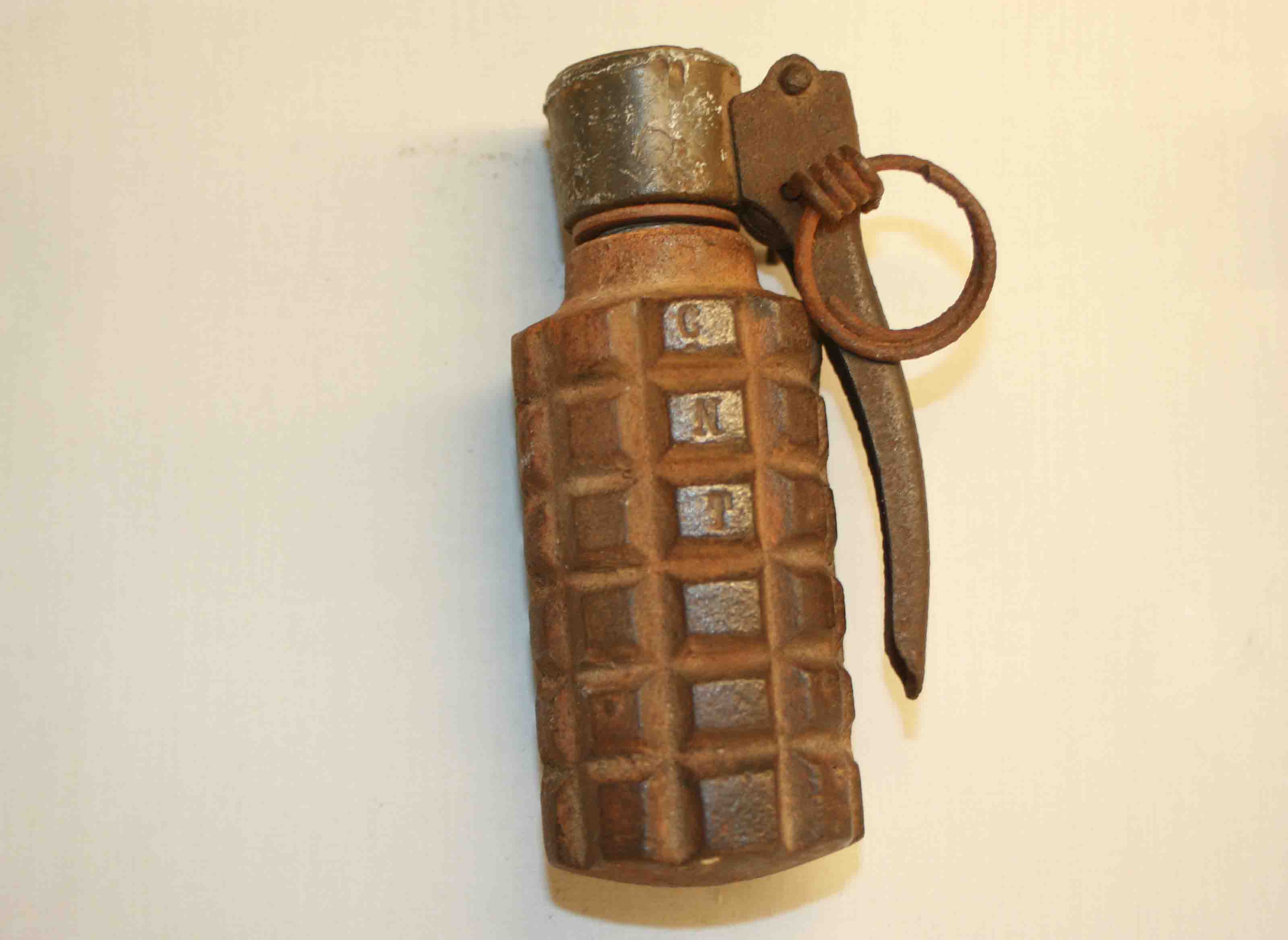
Universal grenade of 6 rows, possibly made in Catalonia, with the acronym CNT inscribed. It was found in the area where the Battle of the Ebro took place.

- Factory number 11 (F-11). It was an important and modern factory dedicated to the manufacture of primary explosives, enceps, estopins, fuses and projectiles. Installed in Carrer Enric Sanchís, in Gramenet de Besòs, it was a reconversion of a very important textile dyeing complex. It produced a wide variety of elements and until 31 October 1937 it manufactured 38,560,000 capsules for Mauser 7 mm, 837,973 baits for mine No. 8, 498,013 detonators for "Universal A" hand grenades, 187,465 fuse-bait detonators, mod. 24 RF, 184,830 encep model 24 RF fuses, 120,591 "Universal A" hand grenade detonators, 96,037 triple capsules, 87,373 7-inch capsules, 73,300 quintuple capsules, 59,820 10.5 and 15.5 capsules, 43,936 LG1 fuses, 27,023 LG1 baits and 50mm mortar, 24,700 1986 model tows, 23,213 50mm fuses, 14,627 detonators, capsules, guns and other caps. To make all this material, the factory made the mercury fulminate, lead nitride and other high explosive and fulminant powders. Inside the factory it was completely equipped with material made in Catalonia, had 513 workers in October 1937 and was divided into 13 sections:
1. Manufacture of mercury fulminant.
2. Manufacture of fulminant powders.
3. Manufacture of lead nitride.
4. Manufacture of high explosives.
5. Development and loading of Mauser cartridge starter capsules.
6. Molded and compressed powders and explosives.
7. Making and loading tows.
8. Making and loading detonators.
9. Load fuses for mortar projectiles.
10. Load of primer fuses 24 R.F.
11. Load of fuse initiator capsules.
12. Checking the metal elements.
13. Carpentry and tooling.

Due to the nature of the products there were accidents. Specifically, an entire ship where grenade launchers were stored exploded.

- Factory number 12 (F-12). Its main activity was the production of cartridges. It was located on the road to La Jonquera, km 722, of Palau Sacosta (Gironès). The facilities of the bottle cap company "Tapón Corona Ràpid" were confiscated. With 250 operators, the factory quickly adapted to the production of cartridges.
- Factory number 13 (F-13). It was a huge complex of 20 buildings, some very large, which was being built by the Generalitat and which should have been dedicated to the production of gunpowder, eventually coming to supply on all fronts of the war. Due to the great magnitude of the project it was not completed and could not produce as expected. It was located at the foot of the Montseny, in Gualba (Vallès Oriental). The group of people who worked there was 550 people.
- Factory number 14 (F-14). Its main activity was, first, the repair of rifles and finally its manufacture. It was on Passeig de Sant Joan Bosco, Sarrià-Sant Gervasi. With the outbreak of war one of the first demands was the repair of rifles. In addition, as some guns were poorly calibrated, new ones had to be made, drilling and cutting them. Taking advantage of this, it was decided to finish making the rest of the pieces and start making completely new Mauser rifles. Most of the pieces were made in different workshops, scattered throughout Catalonia, and then sent to the F-14 to be assembled. The maximum production reached 3,000 rifles a month made by 279 workers.
- Factory number 15 (F-15). Result of the grouping of several workshops, with 100 workers, from Olot: Can Castañer, Can Ciurana and Can Simón. The only director with a university degree was chosen as administrator: Ricard Simón Borrell, owner of Can Simón. They focused their activity on the production of small arms, grenades and cartridges. Of particular note is the production of the Labora Fontbernat M-1938 submachine gun, which was also made in Barcelona.

== Working conditions ==
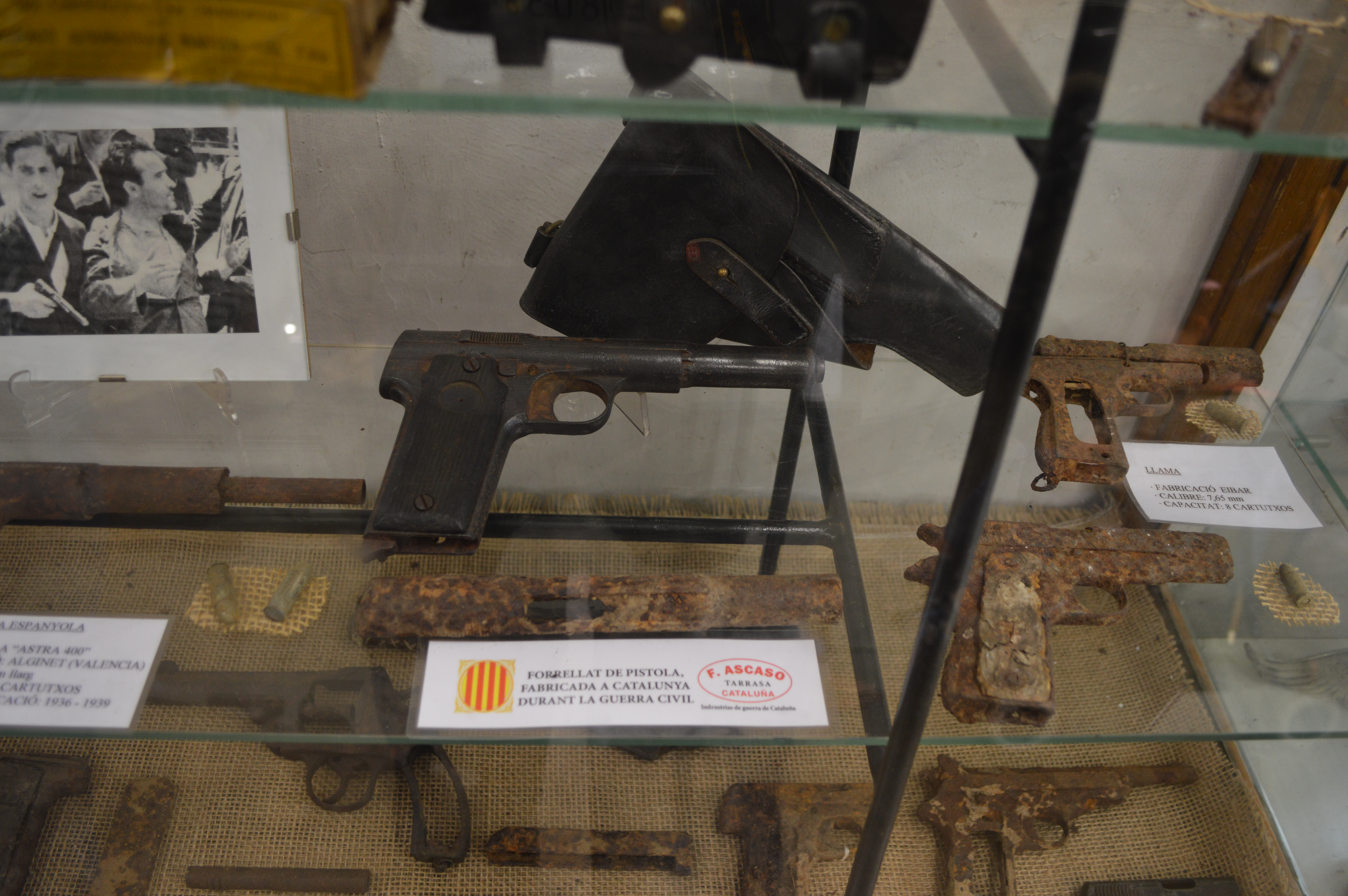
Pistol F. Ascaso made in Terrassa.

The working conditions of the CIG workers were heterogeneous. In general the salary was above average. The days were long and they had few holidays, in some cases one afternoon a week, which could also be used to make overtime better paid (doing jobs such as packing, finishing tasks in the middle of work, etc.). In order to avoid abstention in the workplace to obtain bread or other food, which was distributed in bakeries where large queues formed, advantages were given for the supply of food. In some factories the distribution of bread or milk was guaranteed to prevent the cessation of production. In some cases, especially in the chemical industries, workers were often at risk due to shortcomings in Occupational Safety and Health. The treatment of the explosives caused several deaths and injuries.

In the male case, one of the main incentives was to avoid being sent to the front to fight. However, it was not legally clear how these cases should be handled and very often young workers ended up being enlisted as well. This was also a topic of conflict between the Republic and the CIG.

== Material ==
The war material produced until 30 September 1937, only by the industries involved, according to the performance report of Josep Tarradellas was as follows: Grenades

- 70 mm breakers: 136,662 units
- 75 mm breakers: 387,421
- 105 mm breakers: 69,493
- 155 mm breakers: 21,738
- 105 mm shrapnel: 7,911
- 155 mm shrapnel: 1,187
- 50 mm mortar: 39,869
- 81 mm mortar: 54,549

To produce this total of 718,830 almost 10,000 tons of iron were smelted.

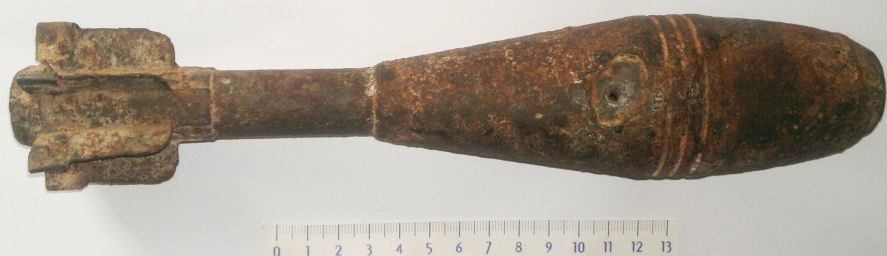
MLIC Valero mortar pump mod. 1932, reformed monobloc, 50 mm. Republican manufacture (Catalan Stoker). Recovered from the mud on the south bank of the Ebro River, about 100 meters from the Garcia railway bridge.

Aviation bombs

- Miscellaneous aviation bombs: 52,746

Approximately 2,500 tons of cast iron were needed to make them.

Fuses

- Specials (until 31 August 1937): 96,512
- D'encep: 469,930

A total of 566,442 fuses were made by melting and rolling about 1,200 tons of brass bar.

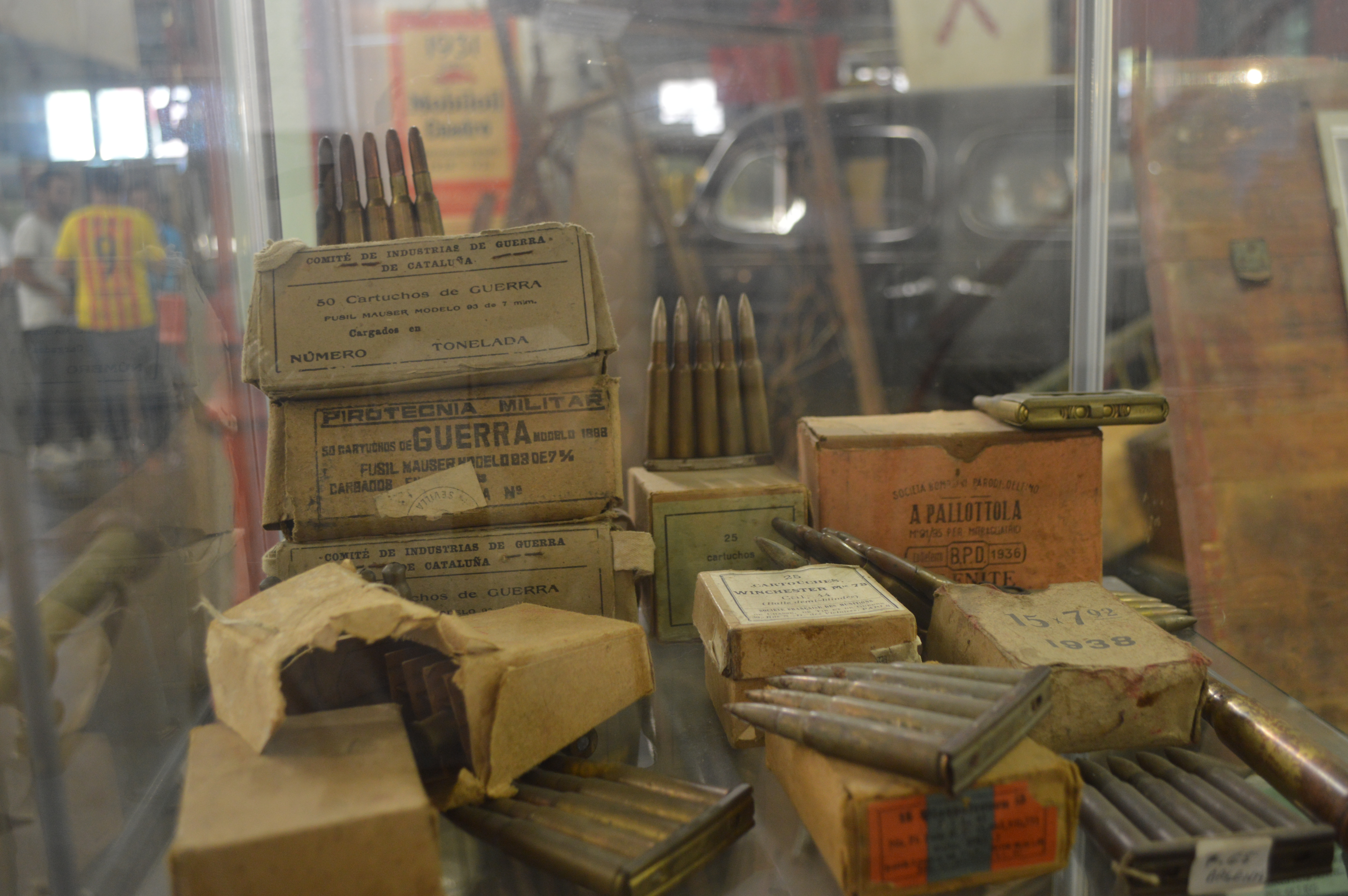
Boxes of 50 ammunition cartridges for the 7mm Mauser 93 rifle, manufactured by the Catalan war industries.

Bullets

- Mauser rifle bullets: 71,497,200

It took 500 tons of lead and 400 tons of brass to produce them.

- 9 mm long pistol cases: 280,000
- 9 mm long pistol bullets: 324,940

Masks

- Gas masks: 100,000
- Civil gas masks (in production): 100,000

These masks were equipped with the corresponding filters. The simpler civilian versions were already in the final stages of production.

Transports

- Transport body trucks: 385
- Ambulance trucks: 284
- Armored trucks: 147
- Water tanker trucks: 142
- Gasoline tank trucks: 30
- Caterpillar trucks for cannon trailer: 22
- Others (disinfection trucks, workshop trucks, kitchen trucks, crane trucks ...): 105

A total of 1,115 transports took place.

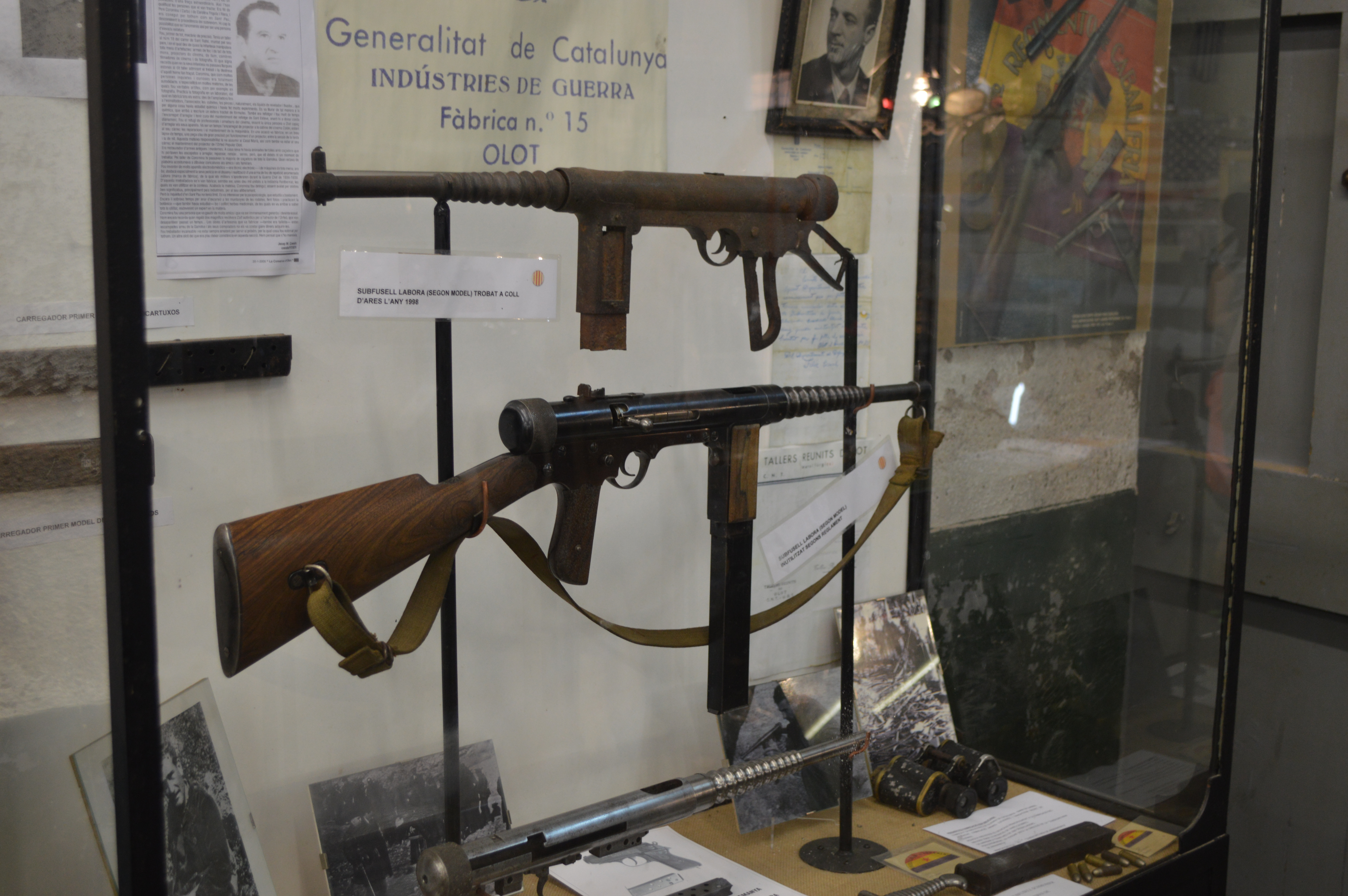
Two Labora submachine guns and the barrel of a Fontbernat.

Others

- Barbed wire: 18,610,100 meters
- Stakes for barbed wire: 419,195 units
- Pickaxes campaign: 53,770
- Shovels campaign: 46,650
- Handles for spikes: 38,320
- Thorns for barbed wire: 8,316 packages

There were also significant quantities of clubs, axes, picks, mallets, hoes, etc.

=== Innovations ===
The CIG received several completely new weapons development projects. These initiatives, often of a personal or local nature, ranged from the assembly of armored vehicles to the creation of war rockets to radio control equipment. Some of these projects, under the auspices of the commission, managed to move forward, others did not prosper.

==== Armored vehicles ====
The manufacture of tanks, which trade union propaganda had tried to promote since the beginning of the war, had not gone beyond armored cars and added machine guns. These armored trucks, often called tiznaos, had little mobility in an open war field and also suffered numerous breakdowns due to the added weight. Until then, leaving aside armored trucks, the only tanks that had operated in the Spanish Civil War were of foreign origin: the T-26, Panzer I and L3/35. One of the CIG's aspirations was to produce its own tank.

In Catalonia, the only places which had the experience and capacity to carry out such a project were the Benach workshops in Sadurní d'Anoia (Modern Machinery for Construction and Public Works) where before the war they manufactured construction machinery. In 1937 it was renamed Factory Z. This workshop, of about 75 workers, had already before the war proposed to manufacture an artillery tractor, which did not go ahead. The caterpillar tractors they manufactured, and used to remove snow and earth, was the foundation of the Sadurní armored vehicles, a series of armored vehicles with modern characteristics. These tractors were equipped with Hispano Suiza 60 Horsepower engines, which were started with a crank, and had caterpillar tracks, which could be iron or rubber. With the outbreak of the war, they partially converted their production to armored vehicles.

They initially produced armored artillery tractors and semi-caterpillars for aircraft towing. Later Soviet tanks would also be repaired or improvements made. But in early 1937 they embarked on the production of a fully proprietary tank prototype. It was armed with a single 7mm Hotchkiss machine gun, placed on a hemispherical mantle, and was completely covered with sheet steel. The Factory Z also produced armored personnel carriers based on the same chassis. These armored vehicles had a carrying capacity of about 6 men but had the roof uncovered unlike the tank variant.

These armored vehicles, popularly called the Sadurní tank, despite being relatively modern, due to the lack of sheet metal or other raw materials, the slow production and the lack of a supply chain to repair them made that the Republican government dismissed its production. It is unknown if the prototypes came into combat or if they were converted into artillery tractors.

==== Rockets ====
Rockets during the Spanish Civil War were mostly used to launch propaganda at the enemy, to illuminate battlefields at night or to send signals. A couple of initiatives tried to give combat use to rockets.

The first project was that of Josep Belmonte Cañellas, called Torpede aeri. This assault guard designed a simple rocket launcher that could fire a projectile 70 cm long and 0.5mm thick, with a warhead. Inside it carried an explosive charge of 2 kg, in the shape of a pineapple to cause more shrapnel. The rocket was propelled at about 700 km/h and had a range of about 1,000-4,000 meters, stabilized with 20 cm fins. In addition, Belmonte also highlighted possible uses and variants of the rocket: land, anti-aircraft, multiple rocket launchers, with incendiary projectiles, etc.

On 12 March 1937, a Generalitat official sent to the CIG requested a report on the "Air Torpedo". The CIG agreed to communicate to the Ministry of Defense of the Generalitat the intention to make 6 models to test their capabilities, asking Josep Belmonte for a mold. In the end, however, the invention did not prosper.

The second rocket project was carried out by the trade unionist Ramon Angelats. Knowing that artillery projectiles were very expensive, he decided to look for a cheaper alternative. After some tests Angelados was able to design a rocket with a range of 3,000-4,000 meters with an explosive charge of 4 kg. 24 of these weapons went into battle on the Aragon front and the south. Although the production took place in Catalonia, the CIG was not involved.

==== Unmanned widgets ====
Images of what look like a pair of unmanned naval widgets are preserved in the Montserrat Tarradellas i Macià Archive. The first appears to be a small vessel, with hydrodynamic forms, that was operated with a radio control system. In addition to photographs of the ship there are images of valve transmitters and receivers, motors similar to the current servomotors, accumulators, etc. Altogether it could be the guidance system of the widget, this is a hypothesis, as no document has been found to corroborate this.

The other unmanned naval apparatus is what appears to be an aquatic mobile target. Small in size and with a unique shape, it could be used for shooting tests or for making false targets for the enemy.

== Technical publications ==
To detail the production methods and record the successes, the Commission published seventeen volumes that formed a collection of technical publications. In total, however, there were up to twenty-eight. The titles were as follows:

Post title	Volumes	Post title	Volumes
70mm breaking grenades	I	70 kg aviation pumps	XIV
75mm breaking grenades	II	250 kg aviation pumps	XV
105mm grenade launchers	III	500 kg aviation pumps	XVI
155mm breaking grenades	IV	Fuses for aviation bombs	XVII
105mm shrapnel grenades	V	Hand pumps	XVIII
155mm shrapnel grenades	VI	Grenades L.G.1	XIX
50mm mortar grenades	VII	Grenade launcher L.G.1.	XX
81mm mortar grenades	VIII	50 mm mortar	XXI
45mm steel grenades, high explosive	IX	81 mm mortar	XII
7.65 cm anti-aircraft grenades	X	Ascaso Pistol	XXIII
Fuses	XI	Fontbernat machine gun	XXIV
Cartridges	XII	Carabiner Mauser	XXV-XXVI-XXVII
12 kg aviation pumps	XIII	Smokeless powders	XXVIII

== See also ==
- Catalonia Offensive
- Polikarpov I-15

== Bibliography ==
- Gesalí, David; Íñiguez, David (2012). La guerra aèria a Catalunya (1936-1939) (in Catalan) (1st ed.). Barcelona: Rafael Dalmau Editor. p. 575. ISBN 978-84-232-0775-6.
- Hurtado, Víctor; Segura, Antoni; Villarroya, Joan (2012). Atles de la Guerra Civil a Catalunya (in Catalan) (2nd ed.). Barcelona: Edicions DAU i Ajuntament de Barcelona. p. 505. ISBN 978-84-9850-382-1.
- Tarradellas, Josep (2007). La Indústria de Guerra a Catalunya (1936-1939). L'obra de la Comissió, creada per la Generalitat, i el seu report d'actuació. Col·lecció Guimet (in Catalan) (1st ed.). Lleida: Pagès Editors, SL. p. 202. ISBN 978-84-9779-579-1.
- Villarroya, Joan (April 2014). Jordi Grau (ed.). L'ofensiva final contra Catalunya. 75 anys, diari d'una ocupació (in Catalan). Vol. 1 (1st ed.). Girona: El Punt Avui. p. 159. DL GI 540-2014.
