= National Republican Guard (Spain) =

- Guardia Nacional Republicana
- Active: 1936–1937
- Country: Second Spanish Republic
- Type: Gendarmerie
- Role: Maintenance of public order
- Headquarters: Madrid
- Anniversaries: 29 August
- Engagements: Spanish Civil War: May Days

Commanders
- Inspector General: General José Sanjurjo y Rodríguez de Arias

The National Republican Guard (Spanish: Guardia Nacional Republicana, GNR) was a public security corps which existed in the Second Spanish Republic at the commencement of the Spanish Civil War, successor of the Civil Guard within the Republican faction.

== History ==
The GNR was created by decree of 29 August 1936, by which the Civil Guard still existing within the Republican faction was renamed the National Republican Guard. Given the important extension of the rebellion among the Civil Guard, this reorganization was due to the interest of the republican government to ensure the fidelity and reliability of the members of the Civil Guard who had remained loyal to the government during the Spanish coup of July 1936. General José Sanjurjo y Rodríguez de Arias was appointed Inspector General of the GNR until 19 October 1937, when it was integrated into the new Interior Security Corps.

On 27 December 1936, the new Internal Security Corps was created, in which the members of the GNR should be integrated. However, the integration process was slow due to the changing fortunes of the conflict and took some time. For example, during the May Days of 1937 in Barcelona the GNR was still operative, coming to intervene with the Guardia de Asalto in the street fighting against the militants of the CNT–FAI and the POUM. At the end of 1937 the reorganization of the last remnants of the GNR was completed, with which it disappeared definitively.

== See also ==
- Guardia de Asalto
- Civil Guard (Spain)
- Spanish Republican Armed Forces
