= Vicente Guarner =

Spanish military officer and diplomat (1893–1981)

Vicenç Guarner i Vivancos (1893–1981) held senior positions in the Republican Army during the Spanish Civil War.
