= Republican faction (Spanish Civil War) =

Side in the Spanish Civil War that supported the Second Spanish Republic

- Bando republicano
- Flag of the Second Spanish Republic
- Dates active: 17 July 1936 – 1 April 1939
- Active regions: Republican zone Revolutionary Catalonia (until 1937); Basque Government under Euzko Gudarostea
- Ideology: Republicanism (Spanish); Anti-fascism Internal factions: Anarchism (Spanish); Communism; Liberalism (Spanish); Libertarian socialism; Moderate conservatism (Note: Some centrist or right-wing republicans, including Basque Nationalist Party and Miguel Maura, were critical or not supporting of the left-leaning Popular Front, but when the Spanish Civil War broke out, they did oppose para-fascist Nationalist faction's rebellion and remained in the republic. However, most of the republic's supporters were on the political left and anti-conservatives.); Regional nationalism (Note: Mainly Basque nationalism and Catalan nationalism.); Social democracy
- Political position: Big tent Majority: Left-wing
- Wars: Spanish Civil War

The Republican faction (Spanish: Bando republicano), also known as the Loyalist faction (Bando leal) or the Government faction (Bando gubernamental), was the side in the Spanish Civil War of 1936 to 1939 that supported the government of the Second Spanish Republic against the Nationalist faction of the military rebellion. The name Republicans (republicanos) was mainly used by its members and supporters, while its opponents used the term Rojos (Reds) to refer to this faction due to the significant presence of far-left movements in the faction including communist and anarchist movements, and because of the support it received from the Soviet Union, but there were liberals, centrists and some moderate conservatives among those who belonged to the Republican faction. At the beginning of the war, the Republicans outnumbered the Nationalists by ten-to-one, but by January 1937 that advantage had dropped to four-to-one.

== Participants ==
=== Political groups ===
==== Popular Front ====
Popular Front

==== Nationalists ====
===== Basque =====
- Basque nationalism
  - Basque Nationalist Party
  - Basque Nationalist Action

===== Catalan =====
Catalonia

- Government of Catalonia
- Catalan nationalism
  - Republican Left of Catalonia
  - Catalan Action
  - Estat Català

=== Unions ===
==== CNT/FAI ====
CNT-FAI

==== UGT ====
UGT

=== Military ===
==== People's Republican Army ====
In October 1936 the republican government in Vitoria began a reorganization process of the fragmented army. The self-denominated People's Republican Army (Spanish: Ejército Popular de la República, EPR) consisted of those Spanish Republican Army units that had remained loyal to the Republic and militia members who were integrated into the new structure.

==== Other branches ====
- Spanish Republican Navy
- Carabineros; one of the units of law enforcement where the 1936 coup of the pro-Fascist generals found the least support.
- Civil Guard (loyalist factions, later renamed the National Republican Guard)
- Guardias de Asalto
- Spanish Republican Air Force

==== The International Brigades and other foreign volunteers ====
International Brigades

At least 40,000 individual volunteers from 52 nations, usually socialists, communists or anarchists, fought for the Republican side.

The vast majority of these, an estimated 32,000 men and women, served in the International Brigades, organized in close conjunction with the Comintern.

About another 3,000 foreign volunteers fought as members of militias belonging to the anarcho-syndicalist labor/trade union CNT and the anti-Stalinist Marxist POUM. Those fighting with POUM included one of the most famous veterans of the war, George Orwell.

==== Regional armies ====
Basque Country

- Basque Army
- Basque Auxiliary Navy
- People's Army of Catalonia

== Direct foreign support ==
=== Mexico ===
United Mexican States

The Mexican government supported fully and publicly the claim of the Madrid government and the Republicans. Mexico refused to follow the Anglo-French non-intervention proposals. President Lázaro Cárdenas saw the war as similar to Mexico's own revolution, although a part of Mexican society and the people wanted a Nationalist victory. Mexico's attitude gave immense moral comfort to the Republic, especially since the major Latin American governments—those of Argentina, Brazil, Chile, and Peru—sympathized more or less openly with the Nationalists. Mexico furnished $2,000,000 in aid and provided some material assistance, which included a small number of American-made aircraft such as the Bellanca CH-300 and Spartan Zeus that had previously served in the Mexican Air Force. Not all of these aircraft reached the Republicans.

=== Soviet Union ===
Union of Soviet Socialist Republics

The Soviet Union primarily provided material assistance to the Republican forces. In total the USSR provided Spain with 806 planes, 362 tanks, and 1,555 artillery pieces. The Soviet Union ignored the League of Nations embargo and sold arms to the Republic when few other nations would do so; thus it was the Republic's only important source of major weapons. Joseph Stalin had signed the Non-Intervention Agreement but decided to break the pact. However, unlike Hitler and Mussolini who openly violated the pact, Stalin tried to do so secretly. He created a section X of the Soviet Union military to head the operation, coined Operation X. However, while a new branch of the military was created especially for Spain, most of the weapons and artillery sent to Spain were antiques. Stalin also used weapons captured in past conflicts. However, modern weapons such as BT-5 tanks and I-16 fighter aircraft were also supplied to Spain.

Many of the Soviet deliveries were lost, or were smaller than Stalin had ordered. He only gave short notice, which meant many weapons were lost in the delivery process. Lastly, when the ships did leave with supplies for the Republicans, the journey was extremely slow. Stalin ordered the builders to include false decks in the design of ships. Then, once the ship left shore it was required to change its flag and change the color of parts of the ship to avoid capture by the Nationalists. However, in 1938, Stalin withdrew his troops and tanks as Republican government policy floundered. Historian Hugh Thomas comments "had they been able to purchase and transport good arms from US, British, and French manufacturers, the socialist and republican members of the Spanish government might have tried to cut themselves loose from Stalin".

The Republic paid for Soviet arms with the gold reserves of the Bank of Spain, in an affair that would become a frequent subject of Francoist propaganda afterward (see Moscow Gold). The cost of Soviet arms was more than US$500 million (in 1936 prices); 72% of Spain's gold reserve, the fourth-largest in the world. The remaining 27%, or 176 tonnes, was transferred to France.

The Soviet Union also sent a number of military advisers to Spain (2,000–3,000). While Soviet troops amounted to no more than 500 men at a time, Soviet volunteers often operated Soviet-made Republican tanks and aircraft, particularly at the beginning of the war. In addition, the Soviet Union directed Communist parties around the world to organize and recruit the International Brigades.

== Indirect foreign support ==
=== France ===
French Republic

The French position towards the Spanish Republic was characterized by its hesitant attitude and its ambivalence. Thus the government of France did not send direct support to the Spanish Republicans and towards the end of the beleaguered republic ended up turning against it, instead recognizing the Francoist State. President Albert Lebrun opposed direct assistance, but the left-wing government of French Prime Minister Léon Blum was sympathetic to the Republic. Blum considered both sending military aid and technology to the Republicans including aircraft and utilizing the French Navy to blockade the Franco-led Spanish Army of Africa from crossing from Spanish Morocco to Spain. Also upon the outbreak of civil war the Spanish Republican government and the government of France in diplomatic messages discussed a potential transfer of French aircraft to Spanish Republican forces.

The Blum government feared that the success of Nationalist forces in Spain would result in the creation of an ally state of Nazi Germany and Fascist Italy that would allow German and Italian military forces to be based in the Canary and Balearic Islands. Right-wing politicians, however, heard of the French government's intention to send military support to the Spanish Republicans in the war and opposed the French government's actions by means of a vicious campaign against the Blum government for its alleged support of the Republicans.

On 27 July 1936, British officials had discussed with Prime Minister Blum their position on the war and convinced Blum not to send arms to the Republicans. Therefore, on 27 July, the French government declared that it would not send military aid, technology, or forces. However Blum made clear that France reserved the right to provide aid should it wish, and indicated also indicated his support for the Republic, saying:

We could have delivered arms to the Spanish Government [(Republicans)], a legitimate government...We have not done so, in order not to give an excuse to those who would be tempted to send arms to the rebels.

On 1 August 1936, a pro-Republican rally of 20,000 people confronted Blum demanding that he send aircraft to the Spanish Republicans at the same time as right-wing politicians attacked Blum for supporting the Republic and being responsible for provoking Fascist Italian intervention on the side of Franco.

Nazi Germany informed the French ambassador in Berlin that Germany would hold France responsible if it supported what it described as "the maneuvers of Moscow" by supporting the Spanish Republicans. Finally, on 21 August 1936, France, the UK, and Italy (under pressure from both France and the UK) signed the Non-Intervention proposals involving the Spanish Civil War.

However, the Blum government provided military assistance to the Spanish Republicans through covert means by supplying obsolete Potez 54, Dewoitine and Loire 46 aircraft to the Spanish Republican Air Force from 7 August 1936 to December of that year. Often with their weapons removed, these almost useless and vulnerable planes rarely survived three months of air missions. Also, until 8 September 1936, aircraft could freely pass from France into Spain if they were bought in other countries.

Towards the end of the Civil War, most seagoing vessels of the Spanish Republican Navy were evacuated to Bizerte in the French protectorate of Tunisia where the fleet was impounded by the French authorities and later handed over to the Francoist faction. Except for a few crewmen who were put on guard duty on the ships, the Spanish Republican seamen and their officers were interned in a concentration camp at Meheri Zabbens. Defeated members of other branches of the Spanish Republican Armed Forces who escaped were arrested by French authorities and interned in concentration camps in Southern France, such as the Camp de concentration d'Argelès-sur-Mer which at one time held about 100,000 defeated Spanish Republicans. From there some managed to go into exile or went to join the armies of the Allies to fight against the Axis powers, while others ended up in Nazi concentration camps.
