= Felipe Díaz Sandino =

Felipe Díaz Sandino (25 September 1892–1957) was a Spanish aviator and Air Force Officer from Catalonia who fought in the Spanish Civil War. He supported the Republic during the Army Coup attempt in July 1936.

== Works ==
- Sandino, Felipe Díaz (1990). De la Conspiración a la Revolución, 1929-1937 [From Conspiracy to Revolution, 1929-1937] (in Spanish). Madrid: Libertarias.
