= 109th Mixed Brigade =

109th Mixed Brigade 109.ª Brigada Mixta
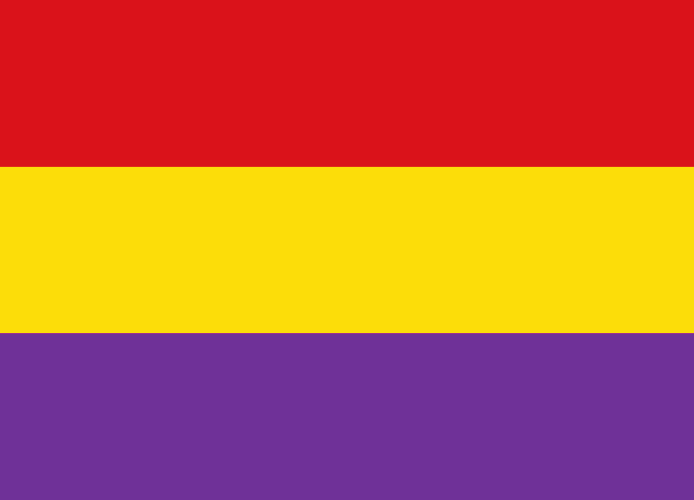
- Military flag of the Popular Army
- Active: 21 March 1937–25 July 1938; January 1939
- Country: Second Spanish Republic
- Branch: Spanish Republican Army
- Type: Mixed Brigade
- Role: Home Defence
- Size: Four battalions: The 433, 434, 435 and 436
- Part of: 37th Division (1937–1938); 29th Division (Feb.-June 1938); 37th Division (July 1938–1939)
- Garrison/HQ: Castuera
- March: Himno de la 109ª Brigada Mixta
- Engagements: Spanish Civil War

Commanders
- Notable commanders: Antonio Gil Otero; Luis Pedreño Ramírez

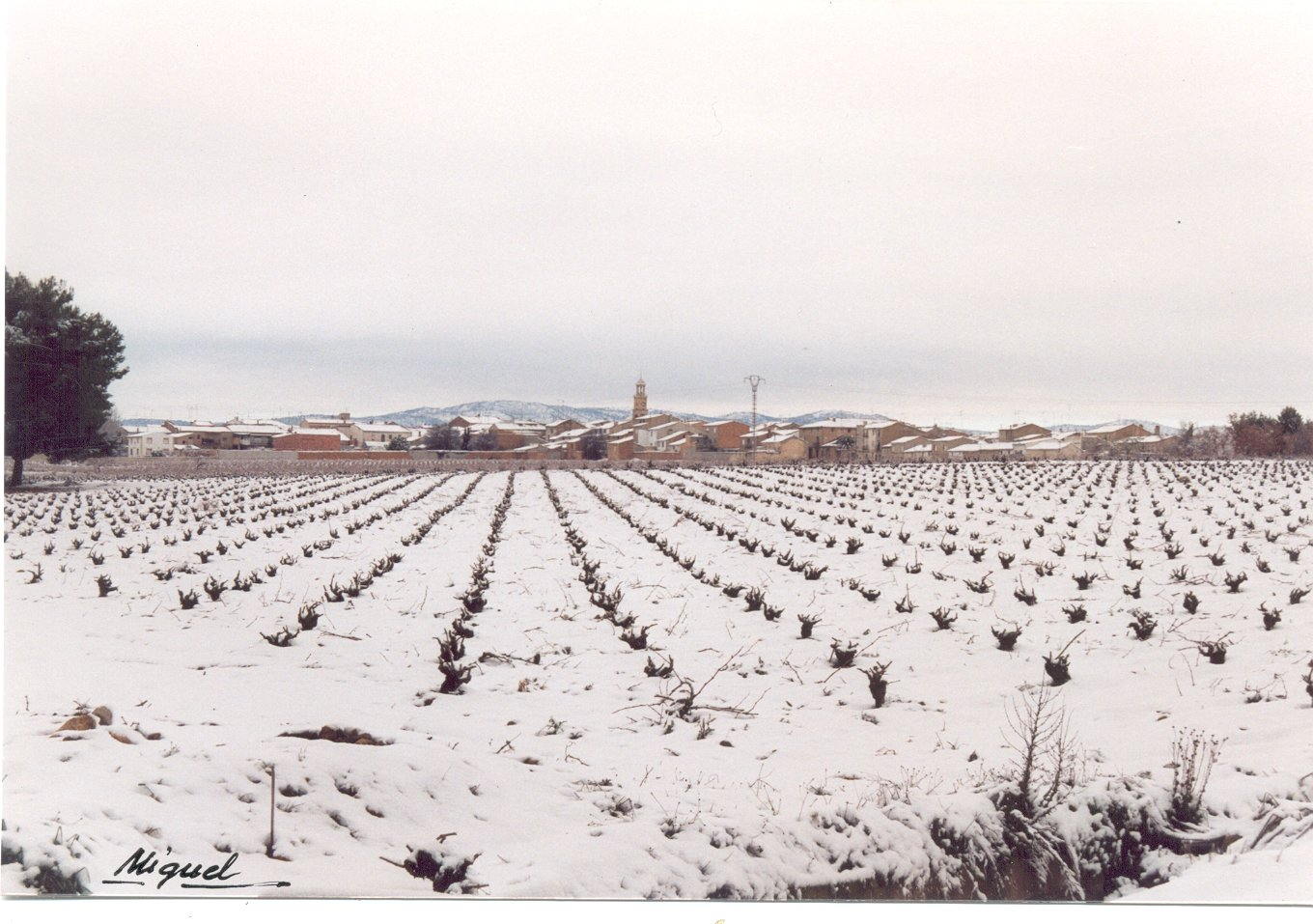
Landscape near Utiel in the winter, where the 109th MB was formed.

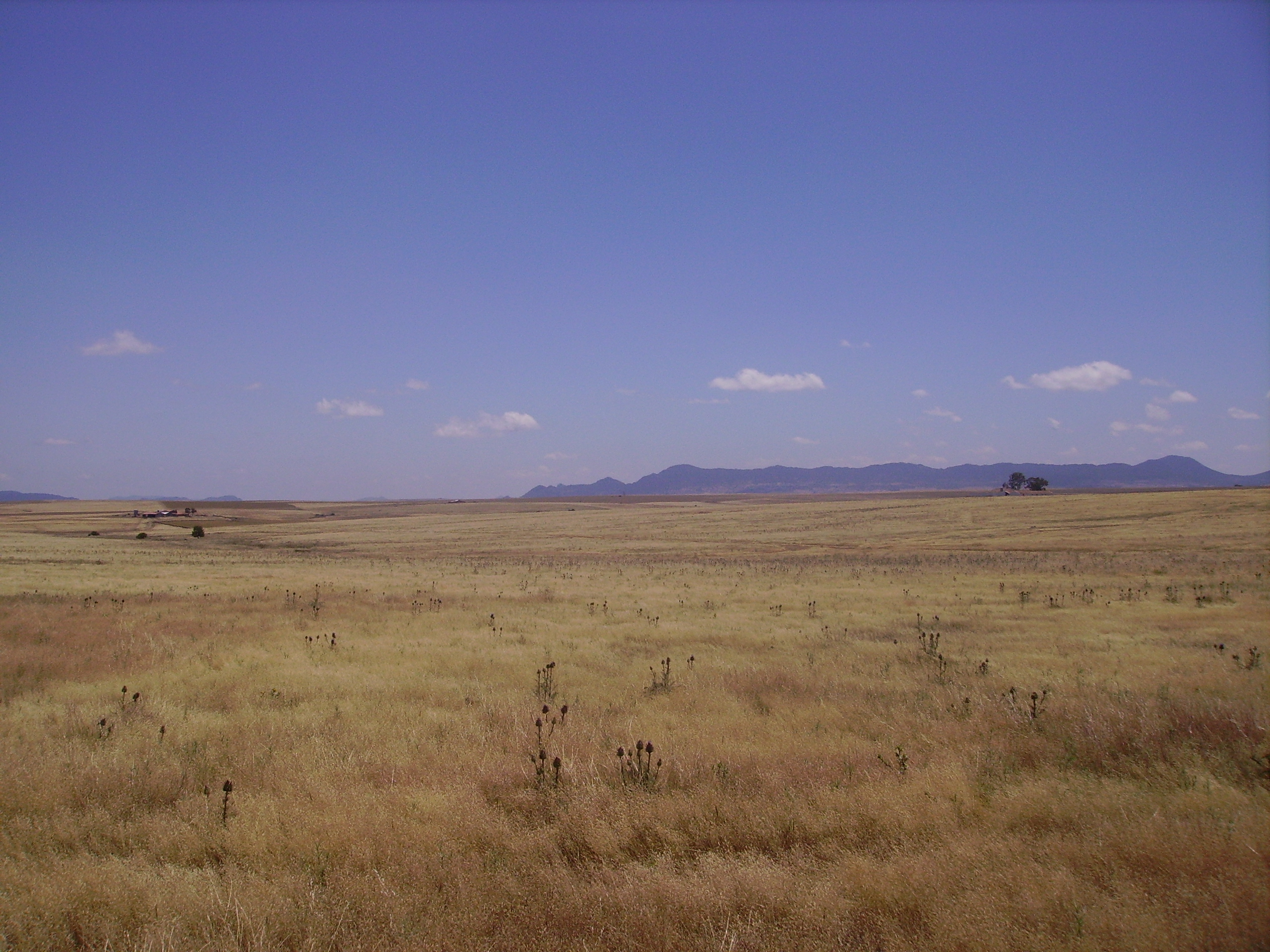
View of La Serena region, where the 109th MB operated until its annihilation.

The 109th Mixed Brigade (Spanish: 109.ª Brigada Mixta), was a mixed brigade of the Spanish Republican Army in the Spanish Civil War. It was formed in the spring of 1937 in Utiel with four battalions, the 433, 434, 435 and 436.

This ill-fated brigade operated mostly in Extremadura and was annihilated in the Battle of Mérida pocket in 1938. Its few survivors ended up in Francoist concentration camps, where some of them would be shot.

== History ==
The 109th Mixed Brigade was established on 21 March 1937 in Utiel. The first commander of the unit was Infantry Lieutenant Colonel Antonio Gil Otero, who had been Commander of the 16th Albuera Regiment in Lleida at the time of the 1936 coup of the pro-Fascist generals.

The commissar of the unit was Ernesto Herrero Zalagán who belonged to the Unified Socialist Youth. Very soon Gil Otero was transferred to the Levantine Army (Ejército de Levante) and was replaced as leader of the unit by Infantry Commander Luis Pedreño Ramírez, who had been living in premature retirement in Alcoi owing to the "Azaña Law".

=== First phase: From Utiel to the Extremaduran Front ===
The period of training of the brigade took place in Sax, after which the unit marched across the mountains to Villena, from where it was sent westwards by rail to join the Extremaduran Army (Ejército de Extremadura). The unit arrived to Cabeza del Buey in the Province of Badajoz on 28 April. The brigade was still not fully formed and its size grew as new Extremaduran recruits from different villages in the area joined it. In May the 109th Mixed Brigade was placed under the 37th Division of the VII Army Corps with headquarters in Castuera. The brigade had been initially scheduled to participate in an offensive planned by Toledo Military Commander Aureliano Álvarez-Coque, but which in the end was not carried out.

On 8 July 1937 the still inexperienced 109th Mixed Brigade was quickly dispatched to close a gap in the Miajadas sector of the front line caused by the 20th and the 63rd Mixed Brigades having fled the battlefront.

Six months later, towards the beginning of 1938, Commander Pedreño was replaced by Militia Major Antonio de Blas García. In February 1938 the brigade saw action without much success in the La Serena Battle in the Sierra Quemada, Sierra de Acebuche and Sierra de Argallén sectors.

In April 1938 one of the brigade's battalions took part in a mostly futile attempt to break the front line at the Puente del Arzobispo bridgehead. Although the intention of Colonel Ricardo Burillo, then leading the Army of Extremadura, had been to occupy Villar del Pedroso, Navatrasierra, La Calera and Carrascalejo, the Republican Army was only able to capture and hold to the last town for a few hours.

=== Total destruction of the brigade near Mérida ===
At the beginning of June 1938, in the first phase of the Battle of Mérida pocket, two companies of the 109th Mixed Brigade rushed to assist the 91st Mixed Brigade which was defending the bank of the Zújar River. Then on 18 June the unit lost the Castuera mountain pass to the enemy. In July, with the second phase of the Battle of Mérida pocket in full swing, the brigade saw major combat action when it tried to prevent rebel forces from crossing the Guadiana River. Heavy fighting began in the Casa de la Rana sector and continued unabated at the Vértice Gorbea, without the 109th Mixed Brigade being able to halt the advance of the enemy until reaching the banks of the Gargáligas River, where the brigade was able to hold its ground, even though only fleetingly, for shortly thereafter the 109th Mixed Brigade was forced to retreat to La Coronada. At this point at the beginning of July the 109th Mixed Brigade fared relatively better —when compared with the other units that took part in the same combats— for it still had 2,127 survivors. Meanwhile, the 25th Mixed Brigade had been reduced to only 630, and the 12th Assault Brigade with 1,134, 20th Mixed Brigade with 1,552, the 91st Mixed Brigade with 1,719 and the 148th Mixed Brigade with 2,063 had fared comparatively worse in the first and second phase of the Mérida pocket battles.

But towards the end, as the rebel offensive continued, the 109th Mixed Brigade ended up getting caught at the bottom of the pocket, being completely wiped out by heavy rebel fire. This battle was responsible for one of the greatest losses in human lives among Republican Army soldiers in Extremadura. In the course of this last battle, Antonio de Blas García, the leader of the brigade, had been called to become the commander of the 29th Division and had handed over the command of the brigade to Militia Major Timoteo Reboiro Jiménez.

There are reports that under the command of Militia Major Juan Guijarro Iniesta a new 109th Mixed Brigade was later formed and made part of the 37th Division, but it is not known whether it ever became functional. There is no data regarding this rebuilt brigade and it was not among the units that participated in the final, desperate offensive of the Spanish Republican Army in Extremadura in January 1939. Some of the inmates of the Casa Zaldívar concentration camp, located in a cortijo in Casas de Don Pedro municipality, belonged to the 109th Mixed Brigade, but data are lacking regarding whether they were survivors of the ill-fated original unit or whether they belonged to the rebuilt one.

== Commanders ==
- Commanders in Chief
  - Antonio Gil Otero
  - Luis Pedreño Ramírez
  - Antonio de Blas García
  - Timoteo Reboiro Jiménez
  - Juan Guijarro Iniesta
- Commissars
  - Ernesto Herrero Zalagán
  - Victoriano Sáez "Ferrera"
- Chief of Staff; Only one of the names of the Chiefs of Staff of the brigade is known, Infantry Captain Leandro Sánchez, who had been Lieutenant and Detachment Commander of the "Regimiento Castilla n° 3 de Badajoz" in Ocaña at the time of the 1936 coup.
  - Leandro Sánchez Gallego

== See also ==
- Mixed Brigades
- La Serena
