= July 1936 military uprising in Barcelona =

- Part of the Spanish coup of July 1936
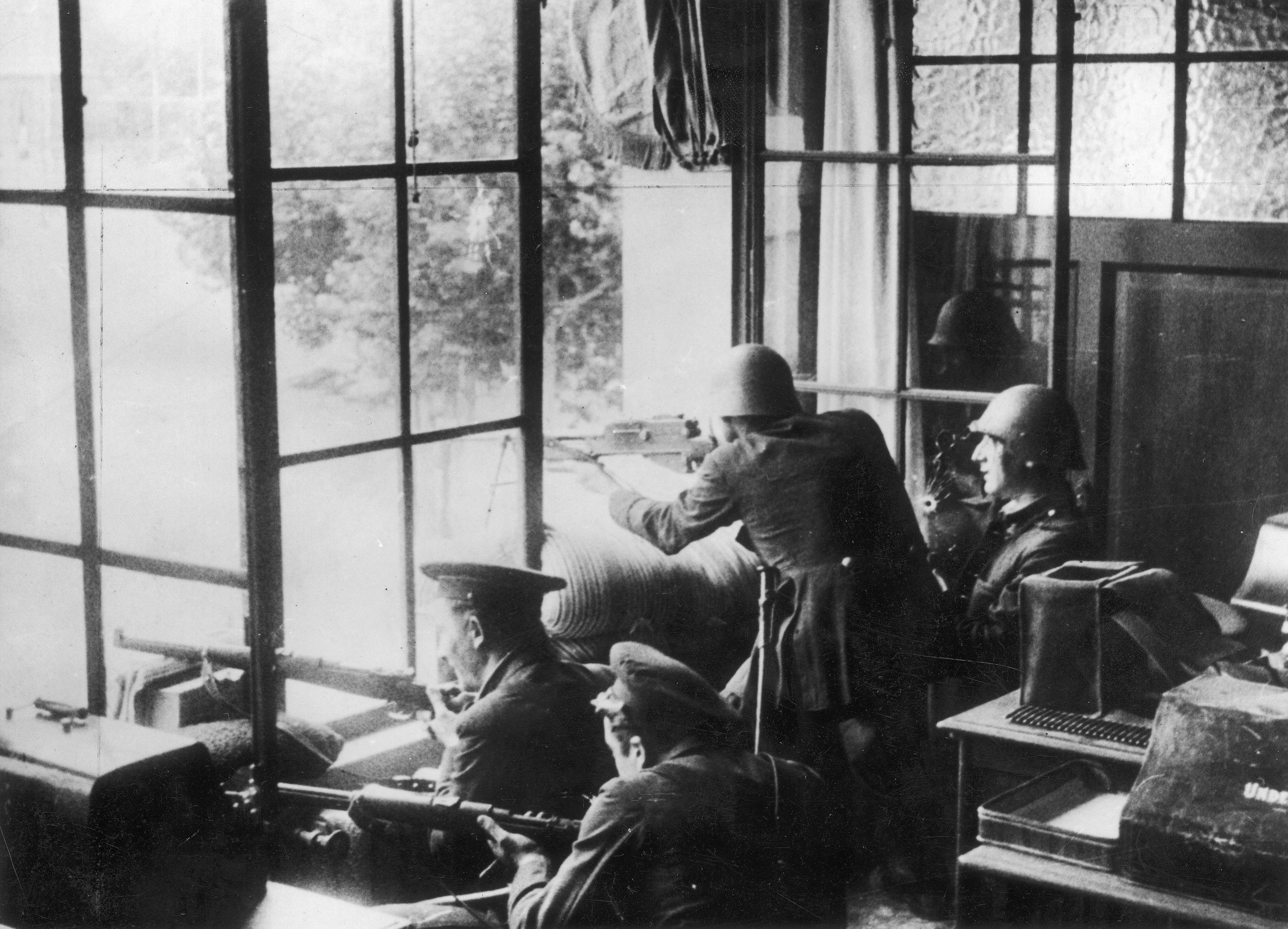
- Soldiers and Assault Guards defending a building
Date	19–20 July 1936
Location	Barcelona, Catalonia, Spain
Result	Republican victory: Military uprising defeated in Catalonia; Beginning of the Spanish Revolution of 1936 in Catalonia

Belligerents
Generalitat de Catalunya; Assault Guard; Civil Guard; Mossos d'Esquadra; Republican Antifascist Military Union; Republican Left of Catalonia; Spanish Republican Air Force; Revolutionaries; Confederación Nacional del Trabajo; Iberian Anarchist Federation; Libertarian Youth; Unión General de Trabajadores; Workers' Party of Marxist Unification	Nationalist rebels; Carabineros; Falange Española de las JONS; Naval Air Force; Spanish Army; Spanish Confederation of Autonomous Rights; Spanish Renovation; Traditionalist Communion

Commanders and leaders
Buenaventura Durruti; Francisco Ascaso †; Joan Garcia Oliver; Felipe Díaz Sandino; José Aranguren; Antonio Escobar; Frederic Escofet; Vicenç Guarner; Alberto Arrando	Manuel Goded (executed); Álvaro Fernández Burriel (executed); Ramón Mola †; José López-Amor (executed); Jacobo Roldán (executed); Francisco Lacasa †; Justo Legorburu (executed); Francisco Serra (executed)

Strength
c. 30,000 workers; 3,000 Civil Guards; 1,960 Assault Guards; 16 machine guns; 8 mortars	5,000 soldiers; 700 traditionalists; 200 monarchists; 100 falangists; 24 artillery cannons; 48 machine guns; 20 mortars

Casualties and losses
200 dead	300 dead
- c. 500 dead; c. 3,000 wounded

The July 1936 military uprising in Barcelona, also known as the Battle of Barcelona, was a mutiny that occurred in Barcelona, the capital of Catalonia, from 19 to 20 July 1936. The uprising was carried out by the Nationalist faction of the Spanish Army, which was defeated by a popular resistance led by anarchist militias and Republican loyalists.

The Spanish coup of July 1936 took place in reaction to the election of the left-wing Popular Front, which was opposed by far-right military officers and politicians. In Catalonia, forces loyal to the Spanish Republic were coordinated by the Catalan government, although its forces were outnumbered by the rebellious military. Most of the resistance to the coup came from the anarchist movement, organised by the trade unions of the Confederación Nacional del Trabajo (CNT) and the affinity groups of the Iberian Anarchist Federation (FAI). In the days leading up to the coup, the anarchists sought to arm themselves, but their requests for weapons were repeatedly rejected by the Catalan government.

On the morning of 19 July 1936, detachments of the Spanish Army in Barcelona left their barracks and marched into the city centre. There they were confronted by anarchist militias and Assault Guards, who had constructed barricades and aimed to isolate the military detachments from each other. Clashes took place throughout the city, with the tide turning against the military following their defeats at the Pla de Palau and Avinguda del Paral·lel. By the time the Nationalist commander Manuel Goded arrived in Barcelona, the rebels were already facing defeat. The intervention of the Civil Guard on the side of the Republic resulted in the defeat of most of the Nationalist detachments, with Goded surrendering later that afternoon. Fighting continued into the following day, when the Drassanes barracks were finally taken by the anarchist militias, bringing an end to the uprising.

The defeat of the uprising in Catalonia culminated in the Spanish Revolution of 1936, during which anarchists brought much of the region's agricultural land and industrial economy under collective ownership. The Catalan government effectively lost its monopoly on violence, with power being concentrated in the hands of the anarchist militias. Despite this change, the anarchists refused to seize power from the Catalan government, instead preferring to uphold a united front against the rise of fascism. They led the formation of the Central Committee of Antifascist Militias of Catalonia (CCMA), a coalition of anti-fascist forces which oversaw the establishment of militia columns to fight in the Spanish Civil War.

== Background ==
=== Civil conflict in Spain ===
During the early 19th century, Spain was politically divided and facing constant civil conflict: the Carlists opposed all modernisation and wanted to return Spain to a traditionalist order; the liberals supported the introduction of a centralised government and capitalism in Spain; and republicans advocated for the creation of a new federalist society based on the precepts of utopian socialism. Following the Glorious Revolution of 1868, Spain had its first experiments with democracy, culminating in the establishment of the First Spanish Republic. By this time, the International Workingmen's Association had gained influence in the country, introducing the new political philosophy of anarchism to Catalonia and Andalusia. As the rise of the republican and socialist movements threatened the hegemony of Spain's ruling classes, the new bourgeoisie and the old aristocracy put aside their differences and restored the monarchy. The ruling order of the new regime coalesced around the Liberal and Conservative parties, which shared power in a two-party system during the late 19th and early 20th century.

The collapse of the Spanish Empire in 1898 gave way to a rise in reformist sentiments known as Regenerationism. In Catalonia, the bourgeoisie began to turn towards Catalan nationalism, while the working classes carried out a series of strike actions that culminated in the 1917 Spanish general strike. Rising political tensions resulted in the rise of pistolerismo, when the Catalan bourgeoisie hired mercenaries to repress the labour movement, and later in the dictatorship of Primo de Rivera. In 1931, the monarchy collapsed and was replaced with the Second Spanish Republic. Republicans and socialists, led by Manuel Azaña, took control of the government and passed a series of reforms during their time in power. The government faced opposition from both sides, with conservatives attempting a coup in 1932, while trade unions became increasingly revolutionary in orientation. Social conflict in Spain thus crystalised into a three-way dispute between republican reformists, revolutionary socialists and reactionaries.

Following the 1933 Spanish general election, the right-wing CEDA party took power, prompting fears that they would establish a fascist dictatorship. In an attempt to prevent this from happening, left-wing forces carried out the Revolution of 1934. In Catalonia, the regional President Lluís Companys proclaimed the establishment of a Catalan State; in some parts of the region, the largely political revolution took on aspects of a social revolution. In rural areas, class conflict erupted between workers and tenant farmers on one side and landlords and clergy on the other. The Spanish right-wing came to believe that the revolution justified a military coup. The political repression that followed the 1934 Revolution set the country on a path towards civil war. In Catalonia, 3,400 people were arrested, including the entire Catalan government. The region was placed under martial law, the Statute of Autonomy was suspended and local officials were replaced with right-wing figures such as Joan Pich i Pon. Catalan landlords also evicted thousands of tenant farmers and sharecroppers, driving up working-class resentment in rural areas.

=== 1936 election and coup ===
Results of the 1936 Spanish general election by province, showing areas where the Popular Front (red), right-wing parties (blue) and centrist republicans (green) won the most votes

The rise of the right-wing in Spain coincided with the rise of fascism and the decline of democracy throughout Europe, with the establishment of Nazi Germany and the Federal State of Austria increasing international tensions. In response, the 7th World Congress of the Communist International adopted the strategy of the popular front, which advocated for electoral alliances between all progressive parties and abandoned the goal of social revolution. This strategy solidified the division of the Spanish left into reformist and revolutionary factions, with the former advocating for a popular front, while the latter believed that revolution was the only way the workers could stop fascism. In late 1935, a series of corruption scandals brought down the government of Alejandro Lerroux, prompting President Niceto Alcalá Zamora to dissolve the Congress of Deputies and call the 1936 Spanish general election.

To contest the election, the Spanish left formed the Popular Front, a broad alliance of all left-wing parties, from centre-left republicans to far-left syndicalists. The goal of the Popular Front was a return to the reformism of the early 1930s, amnesty for all political prisoners detained during the 1934 Revolution, and a return to the normalcy of liberal democracy. Meanwhile, the electoral campaign of the Spanish right was characterised by anti-communism, religious conservatism and anti-Catalan sentiment. In Catalonia, the Popular Front called for the release of the imprisoned Catalan government and the restoration of Catalan autonomy. There was broad consensus that the results of the 1936 election would determine the future of the Spanish Republic. Even the anarchists participated in the election, in a reversal of their abstention during previous elections, leading to record high voter turnout. The election was narrowly won by the Popular Front, with 4.6 million votes to the 4.5 million votes won by the right-wing. In Catalonia, the Popular Front gained 58.9% of the vote, winning a majority in all Catalan provinces, and getting as high as 62.66% in the regional capital of Barcelona.

The election immediately laid the foundations for civil war, with Francisco Franco, José María Gil-Robles and José Calvo Sotelo all calling for the results to be annulled. After Prime Minister Manuel Portela Valladares pledged to accept the results of the election, the right-wing Spanish Military Union (UME) began making plans for a coup d'état. On 19 February 1936, Manuel Azaña formed a new government of left-wing republican parties. As prime minister, he issued an amnesty to all political prisoners of the 1934 Revolution, reinstated blacklisted workers and pursued land reform. Catalan president Companys was released from prison and returned to the Generalitat de Catalunya. The election was soon followed by an increase in social tensions, with strike actions and violent attacks becoming more frequent. According to Gil-Robles, over the subsequent months, "160 churches were burned, 269 assassinations perpetrated, 10 newspaper offices destroyed and 146 bombs exploded." In Catalonia, the political climate was relatively peaceful; the only violent attack of note was the assassination of police chief Miquel Badia by anarchists, in revenge for political repression of the anarchist movement by the Catalan government. Meanwhile, the right-wing Regionalist League of Catalonia sought rapprochement with the left-wing Companys government, resulting in the acceptance of centrists into the Catalan government. Primary sources even described how people from Madrid sought refuge in Barcelona, due to the state of calm in the Catalan capital. But the social peace did not last, as strike actions became more frequent in the cities, culminating in a general strike by dockworkers in the port of Barcelona. Workers increasingly grew to believe that the reformist government would not be able to stop the rise of fascism, and that a social revolution would be required.

In May 1936, Azaña was elected as President of the Spanish Republic, replacing the conservative Niceto Alcalá Zamora. Azaña appointed Santiago Casares Quiroga as prime minister, but within two months, the new government had lost control of the state. Right-wing military officers, led by General Emilio Mola, conspired to overthrow the Spanish Republic. In preparation for an imminent military coup, loyalist soldiers of the Spanish Republican Army made themselves available to trade unions and left-wing political parties. After the execution of the right-wing politician José Calvo Sotelo by Assault Guards, a police corps that was loyal to the republic, military leaders accelerated their plans for a coup, openly declaring their intent to avenge Sotelo at his funeral. On 17 July, General Francisco Franco led a military uprising in Spanish Morocco, igniting the Spanish Civil War. The following day, Gonzalo Queipo de Llano led the military uprising in Seville, taking control of the city. Western Andalusia, the Canary Islands and Morocco all fell under rebel control. While rebel soldiers also captured Zaragoza and Valladolid, the government of Casares Quiroga remained completely inert. On 19 July, Casares Quiroga resigned as prime minister. His replacement, Diego Martínez Barrio, attempted to meet with Mola and request the coup be halted, but the government was not able to resolve the crisis.

== Military preparations ==
=== Rebels ===
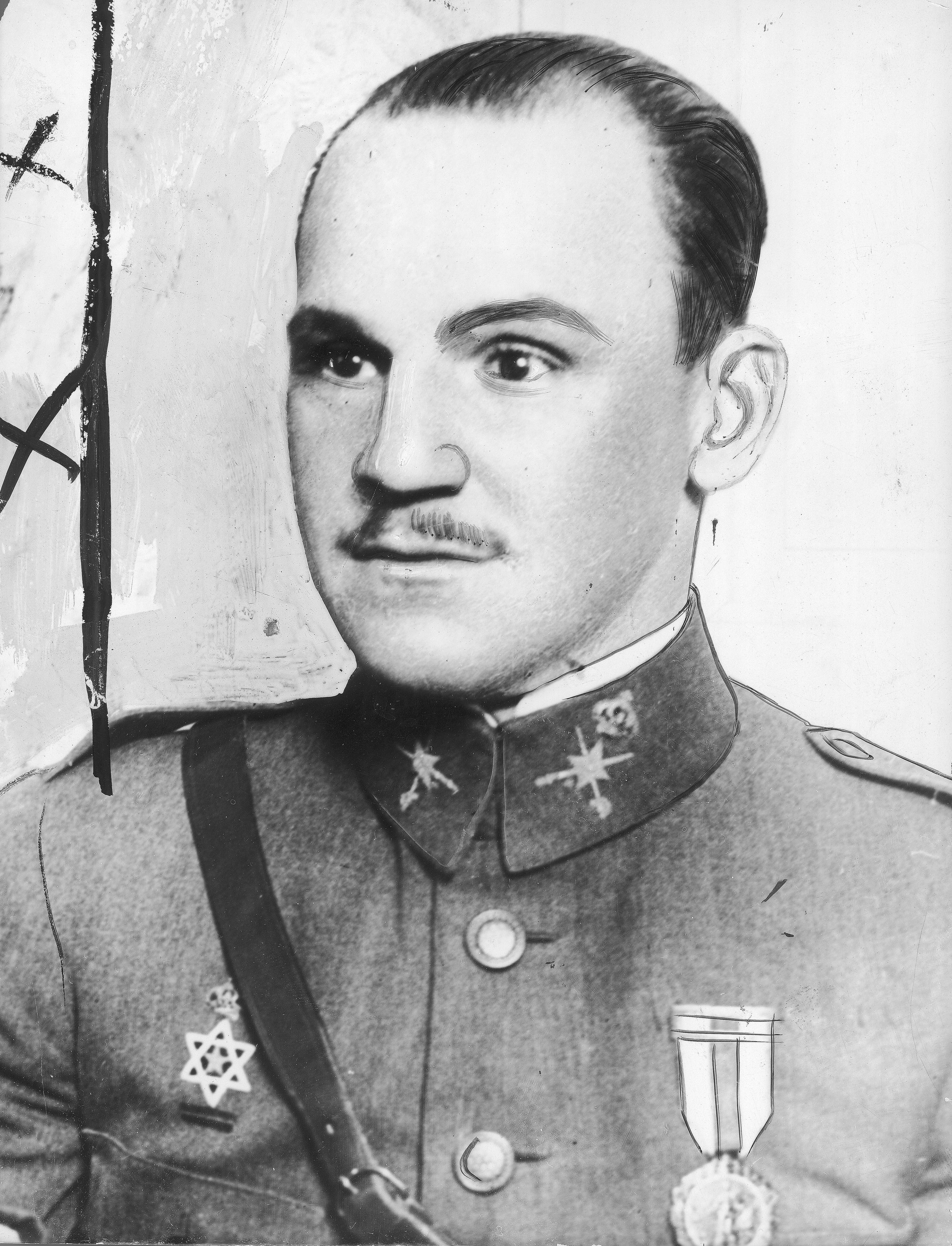
Manuel Goded, the commander-in-chief of the nationalist uprising in Barcelona

Luis López Varela, the head of the Catalan branch of the Spanish Military Union (UME), had begun making preparations for the coup since February 1936. The UME established cells in every barracks in Catalonia, bringing many officers onto the side of the coup. But many other officers remained loyal to the Republic, including the Captain General of Catalonia, Francisco Llano de la Encomienda. He supported the Republican Union and had told his subordinates that, in a conflict between communism and fascism, he would side with the former over the latter. The UME was forced to look elsewhere for a commanding officer. Emilio Mola appointed General Manuel Goded as the commander of the uprising in Catalonia. After securing control of Mallorca, Goded was to make his way from his base in the Balearic Islands to the mainland. During this interim, General Álvaro Fernández Burriel would take provisional command of the uprising. Despite being surrounded by conspirators, Llano de la Encomienda refused to declare a state of emergency when it was requested by Burriel. At the Barcelona Military Government building, local military leaders received orders from Ramón Mola, the representative of the military conspiracy in Catalonia.

The rebels were able to rely on other officers of the UME, who were driven by right-wing and anti-Catalan sentiments, to mobilise their troops for the coup. At the time of the coup, the Spanish Army in Barcelona counted between 6,000 and 12,000 soldiers. Of these, Vicenç Guarner estimated that 5,000 "disciplined but poorly led men" would join the uprising, taking with them 24 artillery cannons, 48 machine guns and 20 mortars. The rebel military units that would participate in the coup consisted of:

- The 10th Regiment of the 7th Infantry Brigade, based in Pedralbes. Although the unit was commanded by general Ángel de San Pedro and the barracks was controlled by Colonel Fermín Espallarges, both of whom remained loyal to the Republic, all of the other officers of this unit mutinied. Commanded by José López-Amor, the two battalions of the regiment imprisoned San Pedro and Espallarges. The 10th Regiment counted 600 soldiers, 17 machine guns and 4 mortars, and would be joined by Falangists on the day of the uprising.
- The 34th Regiment, based at the Parc de la Ciutadella, commanded by Lieutenant Colonel Jacobo Roldán. Half of the officers, commanding roughly 600 soldiers, supported the uprising.
- The 2nd Cavalry Brigade, based on Carrer de Tarragona, commanded by General Álvaro Fernández Burriel. It counted 600 soldiers and had 6 machine guns.
- The 3rd Regiment, based at the Lepanto Barracks in Sants, commanded by Colonel Francisco Lacasa. All of its officers who commanded roughly 600 soldiers, supported the uprising.
- The 4th Artillery Brigade, based in Sant Andreu, commanded by General Justo Legorburu. It was composed of two regiments, with three batteries each consisting of four 105 mm (4.1 in) calibre artillery cannons. Although its officers were divided on the uprising, the mutineers seized the brigade's artillery and machine guns. The brigade had a reserve in Mataró, where they held 16 more artillery cannons.
- The 1st Mountain Artillery Regiment, based at the Drassanes barracks in the port of Barcelona. With the exception of the regimental commander, Colonel Francisco Serra, all of the officers joined the uprising, led by Luis López Varela. It counted twenty-four 105 mm artillery cannons.
- The Engineers Battalion, based near Plaça d'Espanya, on Gran Via de les Corts Catalanes. It counted 400 soldiers.
- The Naval Air Force, which used its 10 Savoia seaplanes to transport Goded from Mallorca to Barcelona.
- The Carabineros, based on Carrer de Sant Pau. Although the 400 Carabineros supported the uprising, they were not able to join it, as they were immediately surrounded.
- The Civil Guard Cavalry, based on Carrer del Consell de Cent. Unlike the majority of the Civil Guard, who remained loyal to the Republic, the cavalry command defected to the rebels, taking with them 3 squadrons of 150 soldiers each.

After the coup, the conspirators planned to establish a new military government in Barcelona: Colonel Emeterio Saz Álvarez would serve as Civil Governor of Barcelona; Lieutenant Colonel Francisco Isarre Bescós as Mayor of Barcelona; Quartermaster Colonel Emilio Pujol Rodríguez as President of the City Council; Captain Luis López Varela as chief of police; Captain Fernando Lizcano de la Rosa as chief of the Mossos d'Esquadra; Commander Rafael Botana Salgado as chief of the aerodrome; Commander Eduardo González Feijóo as Postmaster General; Commander Andrés Martínez Uría as head of telecommunications; Alfonso Rojas as director of La Model prison; Gonzalo del Castillo Alonso as Rector of the University of Barcelona; and Félix Negrete Rabella as head of the Civic Union, a planned paramilitary organisation.

The conspirators were supported by the Catalan far-right, but their political force was marginal: the Traditionalist Communion had only 700 men in Barcelona and 5,000 in Catalonia; the CEDA and Spanish Renovation could only gather 200 men between them; and the Falange Española de las JONS only had 100 willing to participate. The conspirators also received economic support from the businessmen Antoni Llopis and Emili Juncadella. The aristocrat Darius Rumeu provided his estate as a meeting place for civilian conspirators, including the Falangists José María Fontana and José María Poblador and the Carlist José María Cunill. Of the Catalan right-wing, only the Regionalist League of Catalonia was excluded, as they were distrusted for their Catalan nationalism.

=== Loyalists ===
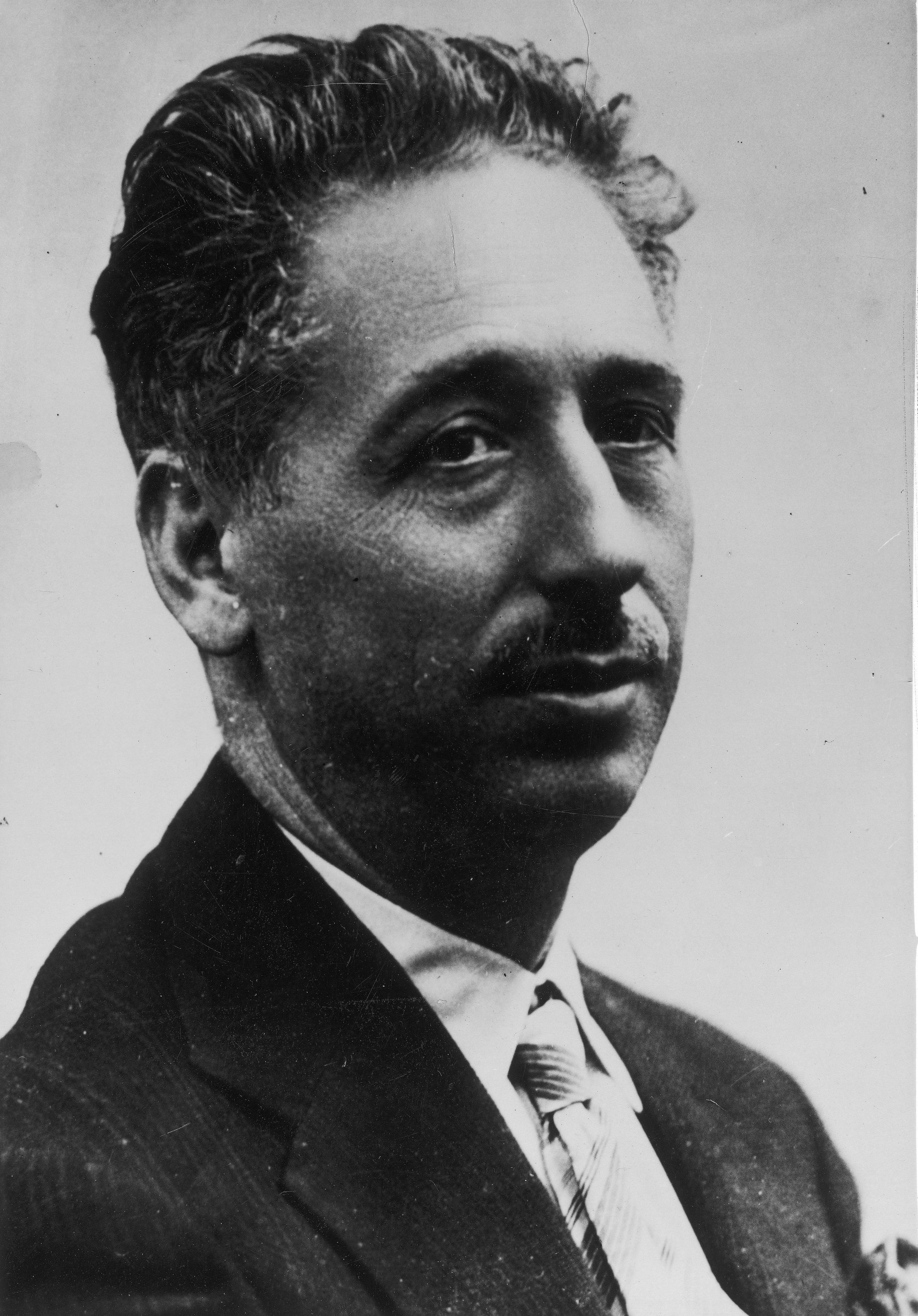
Lluís Companys, the President of the Government of Catalonia in 1936

While the rebels made their plans, Catalan President Lluís Companys began to prepare his government's response to the coup. He appointed Frederic Escofet, a veteran of the 1934 Revolution, as Commissioner of Public Order. He also appointed Vicenç Guarner, the director of the Republican Antifascist Military Union (UMRA), as his Chief of Police. By the time of the coup, the Catalan government could only muster 1,960 poorly trained Assault Guards, 16 machine guns and 8 mortars. The Spanish Republican Air Force, based at the El Prat airbase and commanded by Felipe Díaz Sandino, remained loyal to the Republic. It had 3 squadrons, each with 5 Breguet planes, some of which were stolen by mutineering officers.

The loyalties of the city's 3,000 Civil Guards, led by José Aranguren, were initially uncertain. Aranguren himself was still affiliated with the UME, while the Civil Guards had a reputation in Catalonia for political repression. As news of the coming coup began to circulate, Escofet took steps to ensure Aranguren remained loyal to the Republic. In the end, the Civil Guard would largely remain loyal to the Republic, including two notable units: the 19th Regiment, which counted 2 battalions based on Carrer d'Ausiàs Marc and commanded by Antonio Escobar; and its 3rd Regiment, which had a small squad in Barcelona, but was spread out all over Catalonia.

The General Staff of the Catalan government was led by Frederic Escofet, Vicenç Guarner and Alberto Arrando. In their plans to defend Barcelona, they aimed to concentrate rebel forces at the Plaça del Cinc d'Oros and protect the Interior Ministry from the artillery and infantry based at the Parc de la Ciutadella. They stationed Assault Guards at the Plaça d'Espanya, in Sant Andreu and at the port of Barcelona. They also hoped to protect the Palace of the Generalitat by stationing troops at Plaça Urquinaona and Plaça de Catalunya, but Felipe Díaz Sandino recommended that President Lluís Companys and other Catalan government ministers withdraw to El Prat airbase. In contrast to the guerrilla tactics of the anarchists, the Catalan government maintained a wholly defensive strategy.

By 18 July, Escofet had ensured the Assault Guard would remain loyal to the Catalan government, arrested police chiefs involved in the military conspiracy and finalised his strategy to oppose the coup. The Catalan government fired military officers suspected of sympathising with fascism and declared that soldiers would be permitted to disobey their officers, although these decrees would prove ineffective. On the night of 18-19 July, Catalan police launched a mass raid against people with known far-right affiliations, arresting large numbers of people and seizing huge quantities of weaponry.

== Anarchist preparations ==
=== Plans ===
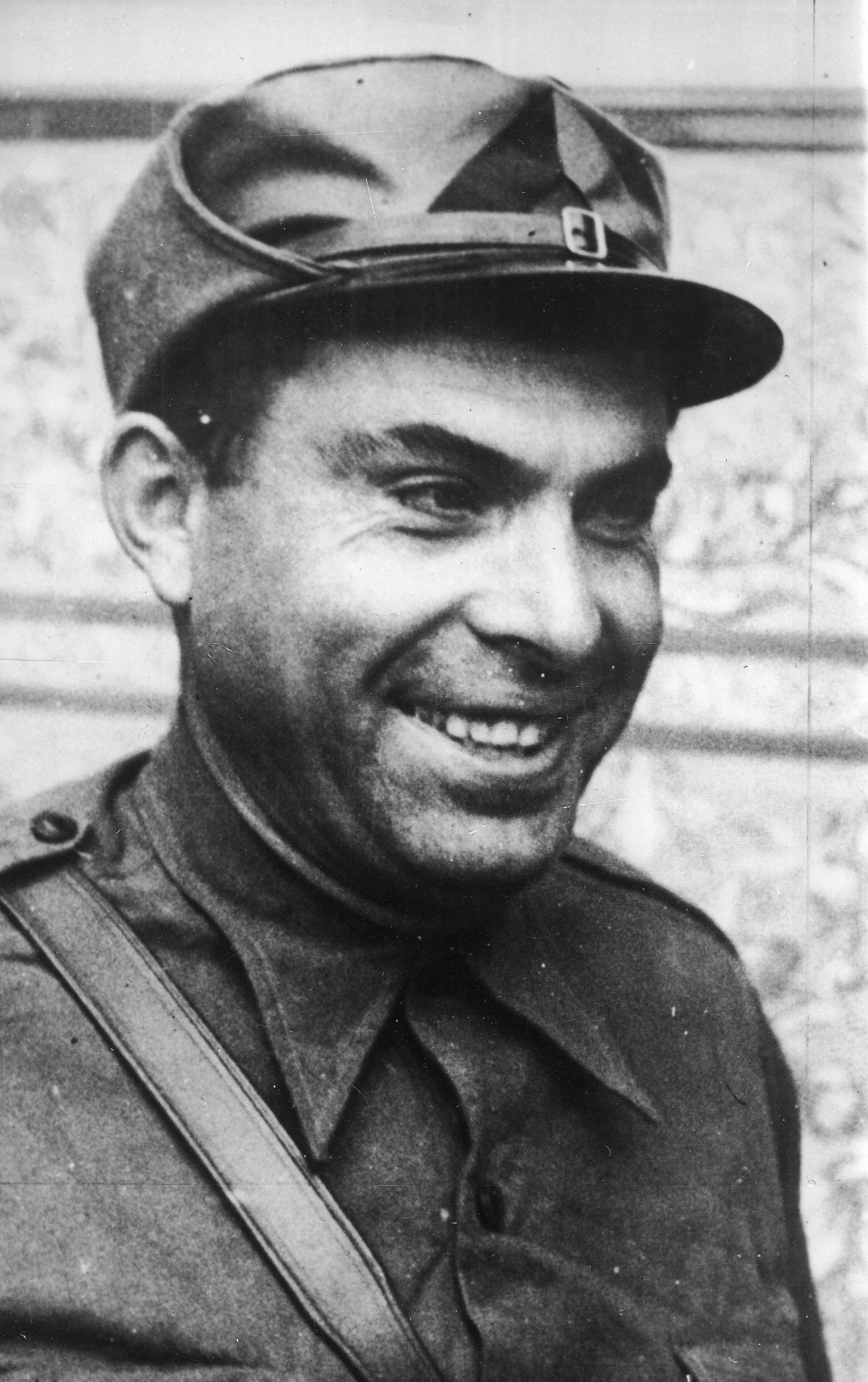
Buenaventura Durruti, one of the principal leaders of the anarchist movement in 1936

By July 1936, the Catalan anarchist movement - consisting of the Confederación Nacional del Trabajo (CNT), the Iberian Anarchist Federation (FAI) and the Libertarian Youth (FIJL) - had already made contingency plans for the event of the coup. Neighbourhood defense committees throughout Barcelona made preparations, collaborating together at the district and city-wide level. The Barcelona Defense Committee, led by the Nosotros group, oversaw coordination between the different militant groups. Among the members of the committee were Buenaventura Durruti, Joan Garcia Oliver, Francisco Ascaso, Gregorio Jover and Ricardo Sanz. They maintained constant communication with sergeants José Manzana and Valeriano Gordo at the Drassanes military barracks and with officers of the Spanish Republican Air Force at El Prat airbase. The moment the coup started, the latter group planned to bomb the rebel barracks, which would signal workers in El Poblenou, Sant Andreu and Santa Coloma to attack the barracks in Sant Andreu. They planned to arm workers' militias throughout the city with the weapons from the Sant Andreu barracks, which counted between 9,000 and 30,000 rifles as well as dozens of machine guns and a number of artillery guns. Despite the lack of arms, they had thousands of workers who were prepared to fight against the military.

Each district defense committee was to take control of government buildings, police stations and military barracks in their respective districts. The CNT's trade unions had their own part to play: energy workers would occupy the buildings of the state-owned petroleum company, the CAMPSA; sewage workers would take control of the sewers and subway workers would take control of the Barcelona Metro, in order to supply reinforcements wherever they were needed. Defense committees planned to allow the rebel soldiers to get as far away from their barracks and into the city as possible. The defense groups would then block their route of retreat and attack, which would isolate them from other detachments and force them to use up their ammunition without resupply. In order to prevent the soldiers from reaching La Rambla, Ciutat Vella and the port of Barcelona, a defensive line would be constructed from Ronda de Sant Pau, through Plaça de la Universitat, to Plaça de Catalunya. As each committee would organise the defense of its own neighbourhood, they would be closely familiar with their surroundings and would not need to transfer between different zones of operation. The anarchists assumed that the army would attempt to take control of the city centre, with its government buildings and telecommunications infrastructure, which would have divided the workers' neighbourhoods in the west of the city from the industrial districts in the east. In order to prevent this, the workers' militias would attempt to isolate the enemy detachments from each other and from their barracks. This was essentially a strategy of urban guerrilla warfare.

Aside from the CNT-FAI, the main other left-wing organisation which actively made preparations for the coup was the Workers' Party of Marxist Unification (POUM). They established a military committee, led by Josep Rovira, Andreu Capdevila and Carmel Rosa, to organise the party's action groups. The POUM also attempted to re-constitute the Workers' Alliance with other left-wing organisations, but the Communist Party of Catalonia (PCC) insisted that the Popular Front already served this purpose, while the CNT responded that they would work together on the barricades.

=== Weapons acquisition ===
By the night of 15 July, militants of the CNT-FAI were patrolling the city streets, carrying only small arms and ammunition. Some were arrested and their weapons confiscated by the Mossos d'Esquadra, the Catalan police, although they were later released in order to prevent a conflict between the two potential allied forces. That day, police chief Enric Pérez i Farràs had met with the anarchist leader Buenaventura Durruti and attempted to find out their plans; Durruti believed that the Catalan government planned on using the anarchists as "cannon fodder". The following day, a regional plenum of the CNT requested that the Catalan government provide the trade union with rifles, but their request was denied, so the anarchists resorted to other means to acquire weaponry. A meeting of defense committees in El Clot concluded that, if the Catalan government would not provide the anarchists with weapons, they would have to move forward with the plan to seize armaments from the barracks in Sant Andreu. On 17 July, representatives of the CNT met with the Catalan interior minister Josep Maria Espanya, requesting weapons for 1,000 of their militants, but Espanya claimed they had no weapons to give. The anarchist Diego Abad de Santillán remarked that "if the politicians feared fascism, they were even more afraid of us". Further pleas to the Catalan government to arm the workers were repeatedly refused. The anarchists had to focus on keeping the few weapons they had. Many of the weapons they had on hand had been hidden after the 1934 Revolution, with anarchists recovering weapons from the sewers and POUM members taking them from their hiding places in graveyards.

On the night of 17/18 July, news reached Barcelona that the Spanish Army had mutinied in Morocco. The government claimed it was under control and censored news publications from printing stories about the coup, forcing the anarchist newspaper Solidaridad Obrera to illegally print and distribute its issue on the coup. The dockworkers' union of the CNT responded to the news by raiding merchant ships at port, seizing the 200 rifles on board and distributing them to the metalworkers' union. They also seized a shipment of dynamite, which was used to manufactured home-made grenades. Elsewhere, anarchist militants began raiding armories. Under the orders of interior minister Espanya, police commissioner Frederic Escofet dispatched a company of Assault Guards under the command of Vicenç Guarner to seize the rifles back from the metalworkers. The union's general secretary warned Guarner not to advance, lest he incite open conflict between the anarchists and the police, and expressed frustration that the Catalan government was attempting to take back the weapons it had already claimed did not exist. Guarner was also confronted by the anarchist leaders Buenaventura Durruti and Joan Garcia Oliver, who pressed him to disobey his orders and allow the rifles to remain with the revolutionaries. In order to save face, Guarner accepted 12 rifles that were not in working order, although he would later claim he had recovered as many as 60. The rest were distributed to the district defense committees. Despite the seizure of these rifles, as well as some .38 caliber pistols taken from municipal police, the anarchists still lacked significant firepower. Their plans to seize weapons from the Sant Andreu barracks remained their best option.

At 23:30 on 18 July, Buenaventura Durruti, Joan Garcia Oliver and Francisco Ascaso met with interior minister Espanya, demanding he disarm the police and arm the workers' militias. They were joined by dockworkers from Barceloneta, who gathered outside the interior ministry on the Pla de Palau, filling the square and spilling out onto the adjoining avenue. The demonstration frightened the interior minister, who asked Garcia Oliver to appeal for calm. He told the crowd that the government would not provide weapons, which was met with shouts of "October", referring to the Catalan government's defeat in the Revolution of 1934. As tense negotiations between the anarchists and the interior minister ensued, Espanya received word that members of the CNT had requisitioned cars and seized weapons from local gunsmiths. Metalworkers had converted the vehicles into crude armoured cars, which they painted with the initials of their organisations, including the CNT-FAI, POUM and UHP. When Espanya appealed to the anarchists for calm, Durruti responded "We represent the people in the streets who are demanding arms, who are requisitioning cars and storming the gunsmiths. We're representatives of a working class that isn't going to go to battle defenselessly. It's your responsibility to calm those workers, who you think of as 'rabble.'" The anarchist representatives subsequently left the meeting and went outside to meet with the assembled dockworkers. Garcia Oliver directed them to Sant Andreu, but Durruti overruled him, told them to stay at the interior ministry, continue demanding arms and surveil the nearby artillery barracks at the port and the infantry barracks at the Parc de la Ciutadella. Diego Abad de Santillán and the CNT construction workers' union then attempted to appeal for weapons; without seeking permission from Espanya, an officer of the Assault Guards searched the interior ministry and handed over a box of 100 pistols to Santillán. Others in the city's Assault Guards handed out rifles from their own armoury to the CNT. During this time, POUM activists Josep Coll and Julián Gorkin had also attempted to request arms from the Catalan government, but their demands were also refused.

== Uprising ==
=== Early hours ===
On the night of 18/19 July 1936, Catalan President Lluis Companys gave a radio address telling the Catalan people to go to sleep, assuring them that the situation was under control. In the early hours of 19 July, the atmosphere in Barcelona was tense. The People's Olympiad, due to commence that day, was cancelled and its athletes prepared themselves for the coming battle. President Companys disguised himself in a large hat and went for a walk on La Rambla, where crowds of people gathered to listen to radio announcements on loudspeakers. That night, workers kept watch of the city's military barracks and many did not return to their homes, instead sleeping at their trade union offices. At 03:00, the anarchist leaders Buenaventura Durruti, Francisco Ascaso and Joan Garcia Oliver were darting around the city, coordinating with the various defense committees and trade unions. They visited the Woodworkers' Union on Avinguda del Paral·lel, the Construction Workers' Union in Santa Caterina, the Transport Workers' and Metalworkers' Unions on La Rambla and finally the Textile Workers' Union in Sant Martí. They then headed to the apartment of Gregorio Jover on Passeig de Pujades, where they reunited with other members of Nosotros. As Jover handed out chorizo sandwiches and red wine, the anarchists nervously waited for news of the coup. At nearly 04:00, an emergency broadcast warned that a fascist uprising was about to commence in Barcelona. Everything was already prepared, except the two machine guns and Winchester rifles they had with them in the room. They heard a knock on the door and a neighbour informed them that soldiers were leaving the barracks in Pedralbes. They grabbed their weapons, left the apartment and piled into two trucks, each mounted with machine guns and an anarchist flag. The trucks left towards El Poblenou, where they were greeted by patrols of workers' militias. When news of the coup beginning reached the Pla de Palau, where workers were still demanding weapons from the Interior Ministry, a sudden silence broke out in the crowd. The silence was broken by an Assault Guard, who handed his pistol to the worker closest to him. At 04:45, factory sirens started blaring throughout the city and the defense committees were mobilised. Members of the CNT-FAI were quickly joined by Assault Guards, members of the POUM, Unión General de Trabajadores (UGT) and even the Republican Left of Catalonia (ERC), the latter of whom had received arms from the Catalan government.

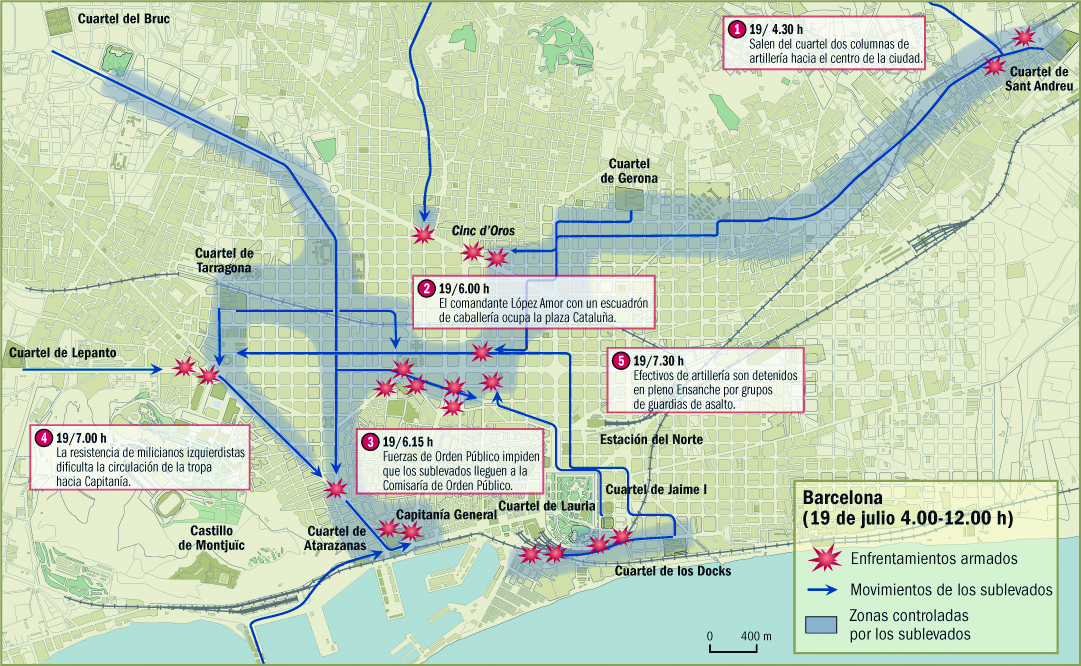
Advance of the military uprising in Barcelona, on the morning of 19 July 1936

In the military barracks around the city, alcohol was being distributed to soldiers, who were told by their officers that they had received orders from the government of Spain to suppress an anarchist uprising. By 05:00, the Spanish Army was on the move. The Badajoz Infantry Regiment headed from Pedralbes down Avinguda Diagonal towards the city centre, joined along the way by Falangists and other far-right supporters. The Montesa Cavalry Regiment headed down Carrer de Tarragona, towards Plaça d'Espanya. The Santiago Cavalry Regiment went from the Travessera de Gràcia, down Carrer de la Indústria towards the Plaça del Cinc d'Oros. Two columns of the 7th Light Artillery left Sant Andreu, marching towards Plaça de Catalunya. And the Sappers Battalion went down Gran Via de les Corts Catalanes towards Avinguda del Paral·lel. Meanwhile, the Mountain Artillery Regiment aimed to seize control of the port and the Pla de Palau, and a company of the Alcántara Infantry Regiment went to attack the Radio Barcelona station on Carrer de Casp. The troops confidently chanted that "the rabble will run like pussies as soon as they hear the cannons' thunder." In leaving their barracks and advancing towards the city centre, expecting an easy victory, the army had done exactly what the Catalan government and the anarcho-syndicalists expected.

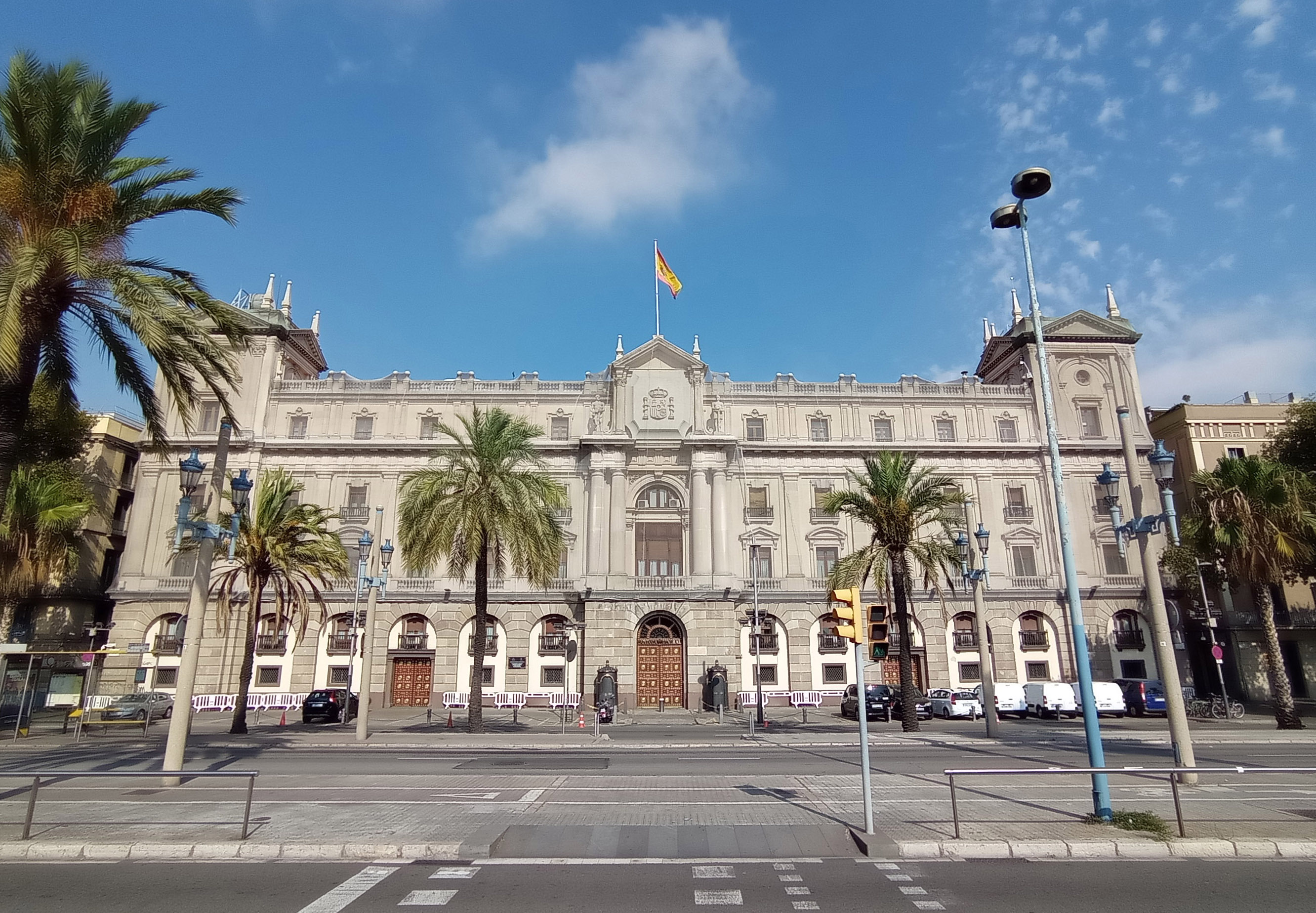
The Captaincy General of Catalonia, where the Nationalists installed their military staff during the uprising

The Nationalists installed their military staff at the Captaincy General of Catalonia, where they deposed Captain General Llano de la Encomienda and placed Álvaro Fernández Burriel in command of the uprising. Meanwhile, the Catalan government had abandoned its own positions: at the urging of Frederic Escofet, President Lluís Companys had fled the Palace of the Generalitat and escaped to safety. From the Police Prefecture on Via Laietana, Escofet, Guarner and Arrando attempted to coordinate the Catalan government's response. When POUM leader Julián Gorkin went to the Prefecture and requested weapons for his party to fight the uprising, he was rebuffed by Escofet. In contrast to the efforts of the Catalan government, the popular resistance to the coup was largely decentralised, led by various different defense committees and trade unions. People lobbed home-made grenades and fired rifles from the rooftops of their houses, while those who could not fight constructed barricades throughout the city. The barricades built from paving stones were even capable of withstanding artillery fire, which many of the workers had learnt during the Tragic Week of 1909.

In other parts of Catalonia, the uprising had mixed results: the army rebelled in Figueres, Girona, Lleida, Mataró and La Seu d'Urgell; but in the cities of Manresa and Tarragona, the army garrisons remained loyal to the Republic. In Lleida, the army and police occupied government buildings, shut down trade union offices and declared martial law, but they did not arrest anyone, which allowed the CNT, UGT and POUM to organise a general strike against the coup. The army also declared martial law in Girona, but citizens' militias were quickly formed there to oppose the coup.

=== First clashes ===
At 08:00, the first clashes broke out between the rebel soldiers and republican loyalists. When one column of the 7th Light Artillery arrived on Carrer de Balmes, they were attacked by Assault Guards with grenades, pistols and rifles. The other column was stopped at Carrer de Pau Claris, where militias forced the column to retreat into a nearby building and set up machine guns in the doorway. When the Badajoz Infantry Regiment arrived on Plaça de la Universitat, they caused confusion by shouting "Viva la República" (English: Long live the Republic), which gave them time to arrest a number of workers guarding the Plaça and take them to the University. Part of the Regiment then broke off and headed towards the Plaça de Catalunya, where workers and Assault Guards fired upon them, forcing them to disperse. The troops then occupied a number of strategic buildings on the Plaça, including the Hotel Colom and the telephone exchange.

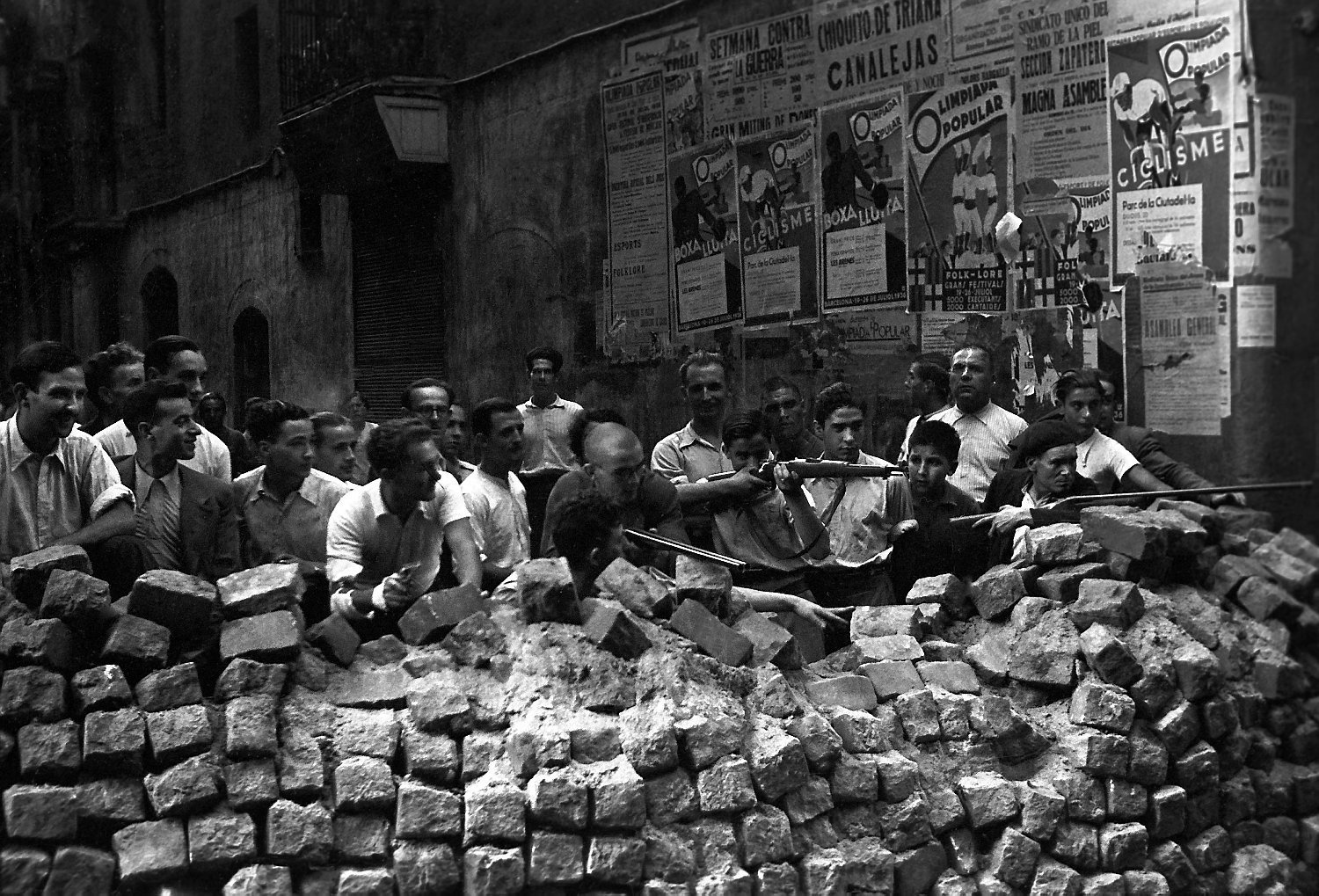
Workers fighting on a barricade against the military uprising

Meanwhile, the Montesa Cavalry Regiment had occupied the Plaça d'Espanya, where they set up an artillery cannon. Here they again caused confusion by shouting "Viva la República", which caused a number of Assault Guards to join the rebels, provoking workers' militias to fire at them with pistols and shotguns. During the fighting, some soldiers were dispersed along the Avinguda del Paral·lel and the Gran Via de les Corts Catalanes. The artillery cannon, manned by Captain Sancho Contreras, was fired at a barricade in front of the Hostafrancs town hall, wounding 19 people. This convinced the Assault Guards to abandon the soldiers and return to the side of the workers. The fighting intensified, with women even throwing debris at soldiers from their balconies, and the workers' militias regrouped despite the cannon fire. While fighting continued on the Plaça d'Espanya, some soldiers from the Montesa Regiment and the Sappers Battalion made their way to the Avinguda del Paral·lel, where they encountered a barricade constructed by the Woodworkers' Union at the Ronda de Sant Pau. The soldiers were repulsed and used their prisoners as human shields to cover their retreat. They then set up a number of machine guns on the Avinguda del Paral·lel, covering the whole width of the street, and the front line stabilised there.

At the port of Barcelona, when the Mountain Artillery Regiment left their barracks, they discovered that dock workers had used forklifts to construct a moving barricade from huge rolls of paper. Together with a group of Assault Guards, the dock workers resisted the artillery bombardment. Shots were fired from the barricade and from the rooftops of some buildings, causing panic among the regiment's pack mules and blowing up some of the explosive cargo. At one point, a group of workers rushed towards the artillery detachment with their rifles held over their heads. There they pled for the soldiers not to attack their own compatriots and told them that their officers had tricked them. Convinced, the soldiers subsequently turned the artillery cannons around and fired on the remaining rebel holdouts.

The advance of the Santiago Cavalry Regiment was also halted at Plaça del Cinc d'Oros, where workers and Assault Guards had manned barricades. Fighting continued around the Barcelona Customs Office, the Barcelona Military Government building, the Columbus Monument, the Drassanes barracks and the Portal de la Pau. There was heavy crossfire across La Rambla, between the Military Government building and the Drassanes barracks. Higher up La Rambla, the transport workers' and metalworkers' unions built a barricade across the street, containing the soldiers to the port area. Troops in Parc de la Ciutadella were attacked soon after leaving their barracks, forcing them to retreat and barricade themselves inside their base. 50 soldiers from the Sant Andreu barracks were also routed by Assault Guards at the intersection of Avinguda Diagonal and Carrer de Balmes.

Popular resistance to the coup was coordinated from the Teatre Principal, where defense committees liaised with each other and with the Catalan Regional Committee of the CNT, which had occupied the Casa Cambó on Via Laietana. The POUM also occupied part of the Teatre Principal, establishing a first aid station in its lobby. The Barcelona defense committee kept in contact with militias on the Avinguda del Paral·lel through El Raval, and with those on the Pla de Palau through the Gothic Quarter; gaining control of these areas would mark the turning point of the battle.

=== Turning point ===
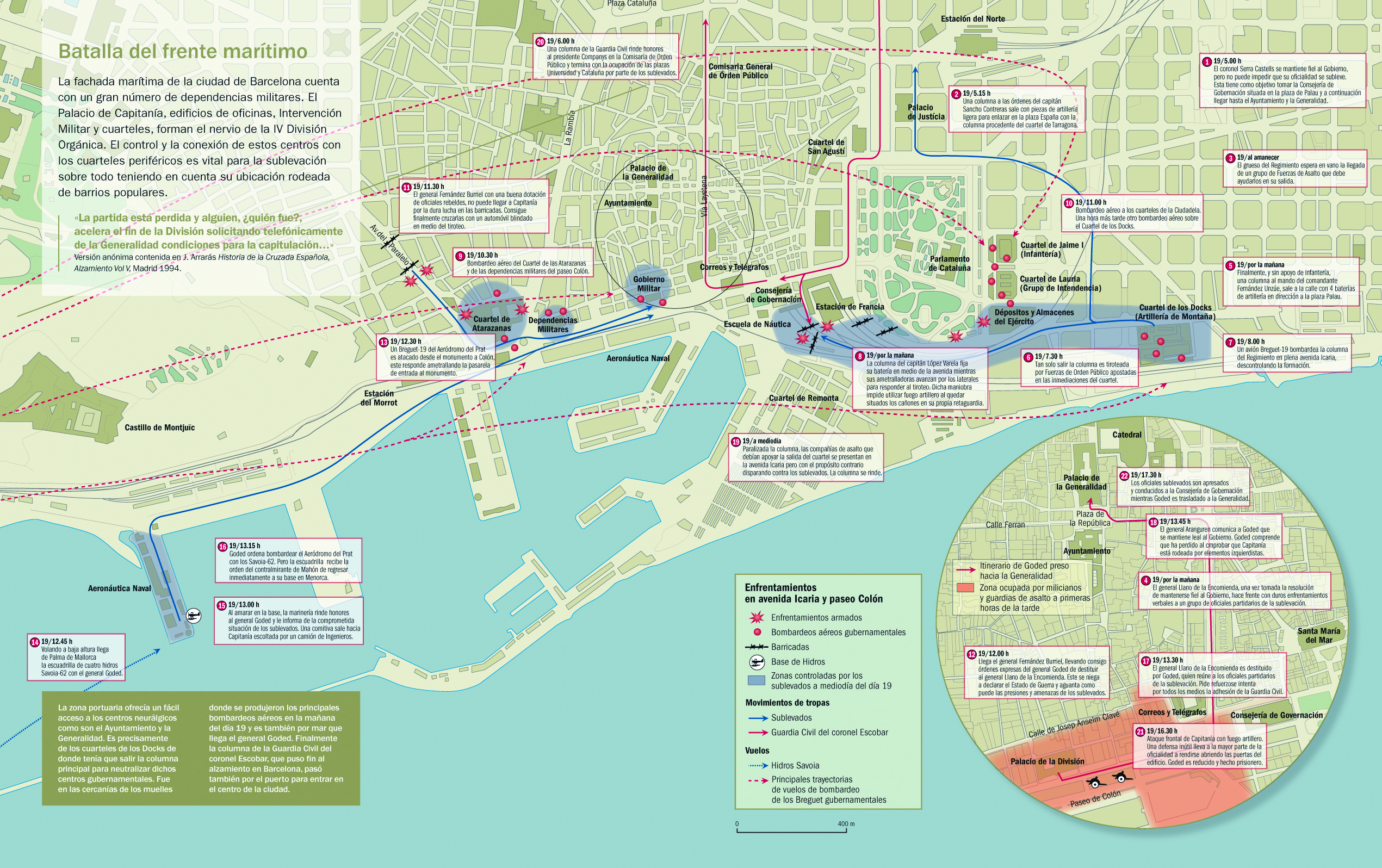
Maritime front of the battle of Barcelona

The first major defeat of the rebel faction occurred at the Pla de Palau, where a barricade built on the Avinguda d'Icària blocked the passage of the Mountain Artillery Regiment. After a few hours of fighting with the workers and Assault Guards, they were overpowered. At 09:30, the Mountain Artillery Regiment withdrew from the Pla de Palau back to the Drassanes barracks, where they hoped to regroup. But as they fell back, dock workers pushed the large rolls of paper towards them and fired on the retreating soldiers, routing the regiment. Workers' militias and Assault Guards advanced, capturing many of the military officers, including Luis López Varela, and some of their artillery cannons. Left without any higher command, some of the soldiers defected to the workers' side, while others barricaded themselves inside the Drassanes barracks. By the time Durruti arrived on the scene at 10:00, the workers' militias and Assault Guards had achieved victory at the port. Communications between the nationalist detachments also broke down, as the workers' committee which had occupied the Barcelona Post Office intercepted and modified their messages to each other, causing confusion in the nationalist ranks.

Also around 10:00, the Alcántara Infantry Regiment attempted to occupy the radio station on Carrer de Casp, but they were intercepted by a workers' militia at the Arc de Triomf. As soldiers were wounded or fled the scene, the regiment retreated to Plaça Urquinaona and took refuge in the Ritz Hotel. Meanwhile, at the intersection of Carrer de Pau Claris and the Gran Via de les Corts Catalanes, workers drove lorries at high speed into the soldiers' makeshift barricade. The trucks destroyed the Nationalist lines and allowed the workers to seize the 7th Light Artillery's machine guns. In areas away from the epicentre of the fighting, workers militias constructed barricades and patrolled the streets. In some places they were fired upon from bell towers, prompting them to storm the churches and burn them down. When the Santiago Regiment and rebel Civil Guards were about to be cornered at the Plaça del Cinc d'Oros, Francisco Lacasa ordered them to retreat. They took refuge in the old Carmelite Convent, where they were besieged and ultimately wiped out. Several priests in the convent were summarily executed, having been falsely accused of taking part in the fighting.

Fighting continued at the Plaça de Catalunya, Plaça d'Espanya and Plaça de la Universitat, where both sides remained entrenched. POUM youth leader Germinal Vidal was killed in the battle at the university. Meanwhile, soldiers on the Ronda de Sant Pau had driven the workers' militias from the Avinguda del Paral·lel and managed to make contact with their counterparts on the Plaça d'Espanya and in the port. Durruti, Ascaso and Garcia Oliver met at the defense committees' centre at the Teatre Principal, where they discussed how to prevent the troops from gaining control of the port. They were soon joined by Domingo Belmonte, a member of the CNT Woodworkers' Union, who updated them on the situation on the Ronda de Sant Pau, where the workers' militias were still pinned down by machine guns. They were also joined by José Manzana and Valeriano Gordo, who had grabbed cases of ammunition from the Drassanes barracks and escaped down Carrer de Montserrat. The anarchists Antonio Ortiz and Aurelio Fernández then joined the meeting, having just been shot at by a marksman in the Hotel Falcón. Durruti responded by leading an attack on the hotel, where they killed the rebel soldier and returned calm to the Plaça. They then placed a machine gun on a nearby balcony and assigned Manzana and Gordo to use it to attack the Military Government building, with support from the Transport Workers' Union.

While Durruti remained at the Plaça to continue coordinating the militias, Garcia Oliver and Ascaso headed for the Ronda de Sant Pau; Garcia Oliver led his detachment down Carrer de Sant Pau and Ascaso led his own down Carrer Nou de la Rambla, converging on either side of the Ronda. They found three machine guns on the Avinguda del Paral·lel: one across from the Teatre Victòria, another next to El Molino and another on the intersection with the Ronda de Sant Pau. When Ascaso's column arrived at the Avinguda, they were completely exposed and quickly came under machine gun fire, forcing them to take cover in doorways and behind street furniture. While they were pinned down, Garcia Oliver's column came around behind the soldiers, effectively encircling them. The workers' militias then attacked, with Ascaso killing the army captain and a cavalry corporal then killing the lieutenant that attempted to replace him. With the commanding officers dead, the remaining officers were taken prisoner and the rebellion on the Ronda de Sant Pau was finally defeated.

By 12:00, the military uprising in Barcelona had largely been suppressed, with a few holdouts remaining on the Plaça Catalunya, Plaça d'Espanya and Plaça de la Universitat, and in the Carmelite Convent, Drassanes Barracks and Military Government building. Felipe Díaz Sandino dispatched planes to drop pamphlets over military barracks, informing soldiers that the coup had been defeated and ordering them to surrender.

=== Arrival of Goded ===
Around midday, five Savoia-Marchetti SM.62 seaplanes landed at the Barcelona naval base, bringing Manuel Goded to the city. He had managed to secure Nationalist control of Mallorca, although Menorca remained under Republican control. Goded was greeted with shouts of "Viva" by the assembled military officers, alerting mechanics working on the base to the true character of the military coup against the Republic. Commander Lázaro Muñoz, chief of the general staff, told Goded that the nationalist troops were "stuck in a mouse-trap". Goded responded that he already knew, but that he had given his word to be there. Hearing the sound of gunfire outside the base, he inquired about the state of the artillery and found out that some cannons had fallen into the hands of the workers' militias. Goded then left in an armoured car and headed for the Captaincy General, where he confronted Francisco Llano de la Encomienda. The pair called each other traitors and Goded went for his pistol, but Álvaro Fernández Burriel stopped him. When Llano was told that he would be judged by a military tribunal, he responded with a wry smile.

The Nationalist soldiers in the Captaincy had hoped Goded's arrival would turn the course of the battle back in their favour. When Goded learned about their situation, he became worried, as he had believed it impossible that the working class could have defeated the Spanish Army. He hoped he would be able to turn the tide by winning the Civil Guard over to the Nationalist side, but when Goded telephoned José Aranguren and ordered him to subordinate himself to him, Aranguren responded that he would only take orders from the Republican government. As Goded appealed to Aranguren, he asked the Nationalist commander whether he was rebelling against the government or the Republic. When Goded responded that he was rebelling against the government, Aranguren informed him that the Casares Quiroga government had already been replaced by one led by José Giral. Goded contested that it was a new government, as it still involved the same parties, and insisted that the army's victory was inevitable. Aranguren ended the conversation by telling Goded that his uprising had failed.

The exchange enraged Goded, who quickly telephoned Jacobo Roldán and inquired about the state of his forces. Roldán responded that his barracks was surrounded by the workers' militias and that his own soldiers believed they were fighting to defend the Republic, not rebelling against it. At 14:45, Goded ordered his seaplanes to remain at the naval base, but he was swiftly informed by Captain Carlos Lecuona Prat that the planes had already departed for Mahón. Refusing to accept defeat, Goded telephoned Roldán again and ordered him to lead his forces to the artillery barracks in the port, where he was to rendezvous with a battery commanded by José Fernández Unzué. Goded then telephoned Unzué himself and ordered him to send two batteries to the port, where they would rendezvous with Roldán's infantry. But Unzué responded that, when his two artillery batteries had left the barracks earlier that day, they were attacked by workers and Assault Guards and their artillery cannons were seized. He reported that they were now besieged in their barracks and had been under heavy fire since Roldán's reinforcements arrived.

Goded lamented that his forces had been "abandoned", to which Llano responded "Defeated, Goded. It's not the same thing." Goded then ordered Lázaro to request reinforcements from Palma and Zaragoza, and to order troops in Girona and Mataró to march on Barcelona. Lázaro responded that the telegraph lines to the two Catalan cities had been cut, so Goded ordered an officer to go to Mataró and bring the troops back himself, but by that time the Captaincy General was already surrounded. Disarray immediately broke out among the officers in the besieged Captaincy General: some, including Burriel, began to treat Llano with more deference and sought to surrender; others wanted to kill Llano and continue fighting.

=== Final battles ===
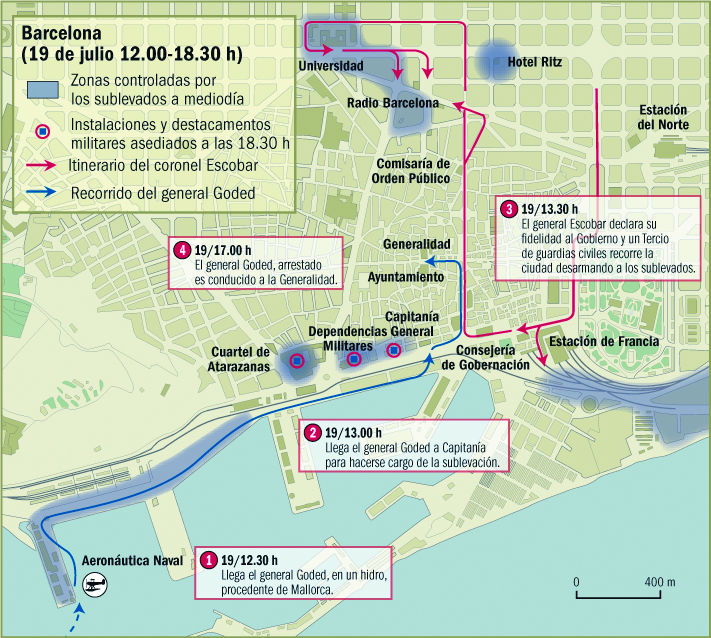
Course of the battle of Barcelona, during the afternoon of 19 July 1936

By this time, workers throughout the city had poured out into the streets upon learning of the coup's defeat. Cafes and restaurants reopened, serving refreshments to the militiamen on the barricades. CNT cars continued driving around the city, keeping the militias up to date on the state of the battle. Early in the afternoon, an FAI group from Terrassa occupied the barracks in Pedralbes, renaming it to the "Bakunin barracks" and establishing a War Committee, which oversaw the establishment of organised workers' militias. As more barracks throughout the city fell under workers' control, military discipline collapsed and many soldiers joined the workers. Hundreds of rifles, machine guns and artillery cannons were seized, providing the militias with the arms necessary to finish off the uprising.

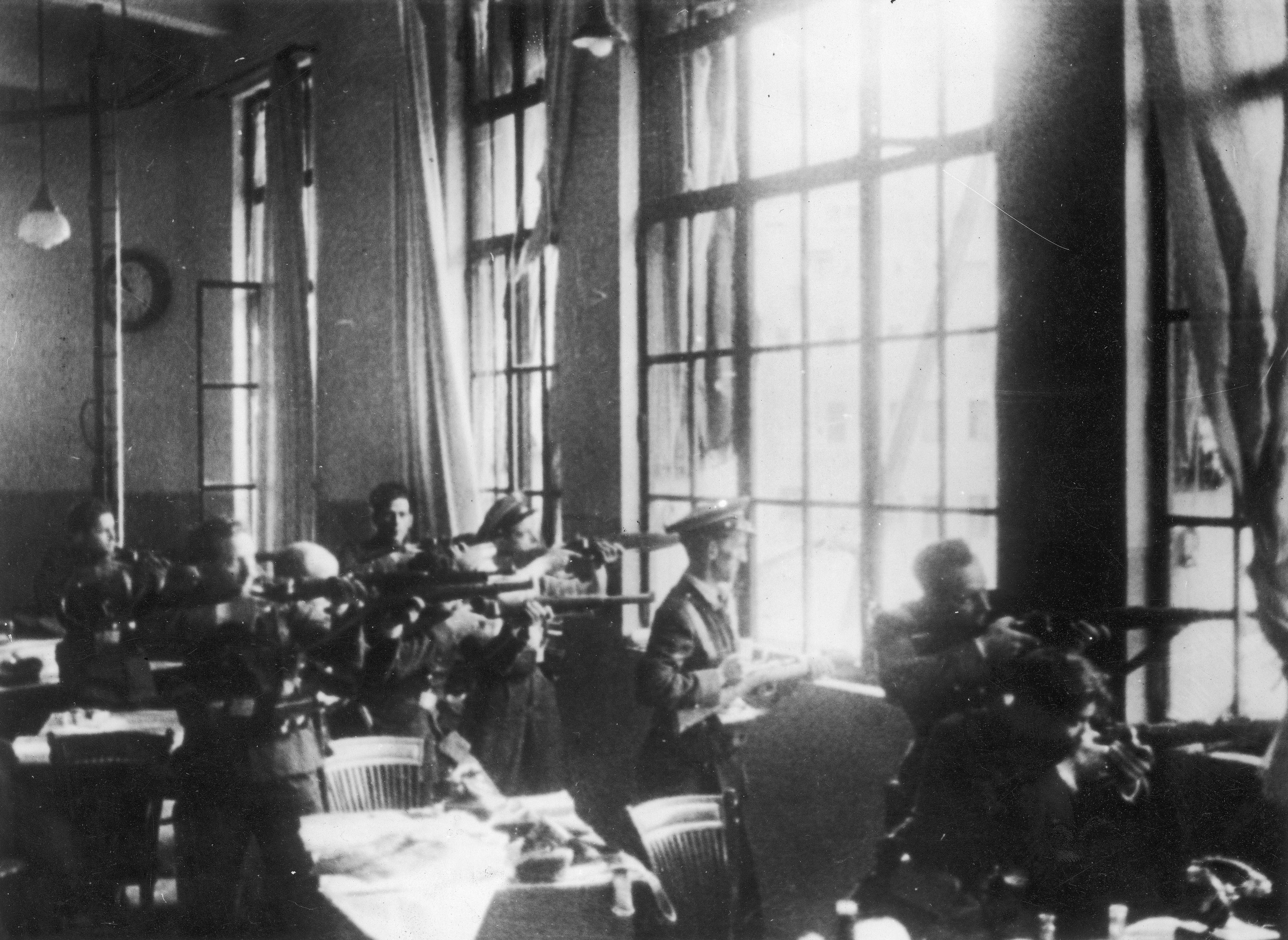
Republican soldiers and Assault Guards during the July 1936 uprising in Barcelona, in the Telefónica Building

At 14:00, the Civil Guard finally intervened to pacify the remaining rebel holdouts. Antonio Escobar led the 19th Regiment up Via Laietana, while Commander Antonio Sanz Neira positioned the Quartermaster Corps in between Plaça de Catalunya and Plaça de la Universitat to isolate the army groups. On Via Laietana, Escobar's 800 men passed by the Commission of Public Order, where Companys watched them from the balcony. Still suspicious of the Civil Guards, workers' militias kept them under close watch. But when the mounted Guards saluted the workers with raised fists, they were cheered by the crowds. When the Civil Guard arrived in Plaça de Catalunya, a shootout began, as machine guns at the Hotel Colom fired on the column. Anarchist militants and the Civil Guard column attacked the Hotel, leading to the surrender of the troops inside after 30 minutes. On the other side of the Plaça, Durruti led an attack on the telephone exchange between Carrer de Fontanella and the Portal de l'Àngel. Many anarchists died in the attack, including the Mexican anarchist Enrique Obregón. After getting through the front door, fighting ensued inside the building. The CNT ultimately captured the telephone exchange and brought it under the control of a workers' committee. In the confusion that followed the occupation of these buildings, the Civil Guard attempted to prevent workers from occupying the Hotel Colom. But Josep Rovira, who had been leading the POUM's attack on the hotel since early in the morning, managed to force his way through and the POUM occupied the hotel. When soldiers at the university received news of the defeat on Plaça de Catalunya, they surrendered to the Civil Guard. Workers took the university and released the hostages who had been detained there, including Syndicalist Party leader Ángel Pestaña. Meanwhile, the Civil Guard at Plaça Urquinaona attacked the Ritz Hotel, recapturing it from the soldiers inside.

By 15:00, only the Captaincy General, Carmelite Convent, Drassanes Barracks and Military Government were still under Nationalist control. In the Captaincy, Goded again attempted to appeal to Aranguren for the people to surrender, but Aranguren told him that his rebellion had been defeated and implored him to call a ceasefire. Finally, Aranguren warned Goded to surrender by 16:30, or else the Civil Guard artillery would commence bombardment of the Captaincy. When the deadline passed, Goded refused to surrender to the "mob" and the bombing commenced, exacerbating the disarray amongst the rebel officers. The artillery bombardment ultimately forced the officers to surrender. Without consulting Goded, Burriel informed the Catalan government that the Captaincy General had surrendered and he was instructed to raise the white flag. Antonio Sanz Neira, leading a squad of Assault Guards and Civil Guards, was dispatched to take those inside the Captaincy as prisoner. When they arrived, a machine gun fired at them. The apparent false surrender enraged the gathered crowd, some of whom prepared to storm the building and lynch those inside, but they were prevented from doing so by their comrades. Goded himself was saved from being shot by Caridad Mercader. The arrests went ahead as planned and Goded was taken to President Lluís Companys. Companys requested that Goded broadcast a ceasefire order over the radio. In his statement, Goded declared: "Fortune has not favored me and I am a prisoner. Therefore, if you want to avoid bloodshed, the soldiers loyal to me are free of all obligation". His surrender was broadcast throughout Spain, with rebels under siege at the Montaña barracks hearing it from loudspeakers outside. Goded and other officers were later executed for their part in the Barcelona uprising.

=== Last holdouts ===
Following the earlier capture of the Pedralbes barracks, several other military installations fell into the hands of the workers' militias. At 17:30, Alcántara barracks was taken, followed by Lepanto at 18:00, Montesa at 20:00, and the Port and Sant Andreu barracks at 00:00. Weapons from the latter were seized and distributed by the CNT. Naval mechanics also arrested the officers at the naval base. Machine guns on the Columbus Monument were attacked by Díaz Sandino's planes, allowing workers to overrun the army positions there. Soldiers in Montjuïc Castle arrested their rebellious officers, freed their loyalist commander Humberto Gil Cabrera, and handed their weapons over to the CNT. Soldiers' councils were formed at each of the barracks, while workers consolidated control over the city. By nightfall, Barcelona was firmly under workers' control. The last rebel holdouts were surrounded and neighbourhood defense committees reorganised themselves into revolutionary committees, which took responsibility for all of Catalonia and sent out messengers and arms to other Catalan towns. Workers had already taken control of Tarragona, and soldiers who had seized Girona and La Seu d'Urgell surrendered after they received news of the defeat in the Catalan capital. By the morning of the following day, the CNT and POUM had formed a revolutionary committee in Lleida and taken control of the city. The Hotel Falcón in Barcelona became a meeting point for delegates sent by revolutionary committees throughout Catalonia.

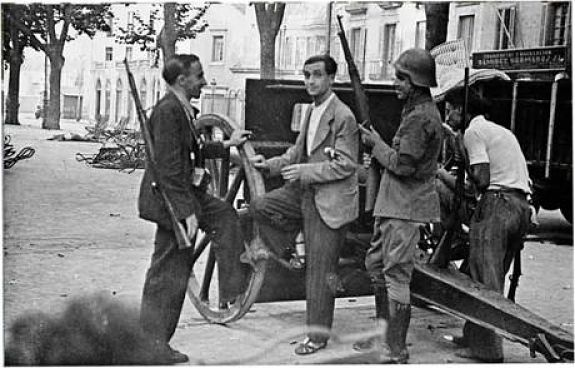
Francisco Ascaso (left) shortly before his death in the attack on the Drassanes barracks

On 20 July, the workers' militias in Barcelona regrouped to coordinate a final assault on the last Nationalist holdouts in the city. The Carmelite Convent quickly surrendered and Escobar's Civil Guards arrested the occupants, but the battle intensified at the Drassanes barracks and the Military Government headquarters. During these final battles, Ramón Mola committed suicide. At the Teatre Principal, Durruti, Ascaso, Garcia Oliver, Ortiz and other anarchist leaders met to discuss how to finish off the last two holdouts. They settled on a plan to attach mattresses to a technical, which had been outfitted the previous day by a German anarchist group, and drive it towards the sites to clear the way for militants following behind. Ricardo Sanz and Aurelio Fernández got into the truck and set off down La Rambla, where they came under fire from the Drassanes barracks and the Military Government headquarters. Durruti, Ascaso and Garcia Oliver followed it to the barracks and took shelter behind a wall, where they were exposed to a sentry box looking out at Carrer de Santa Madrona. Durruti gave the order to attack, shouting "Adelante hombres de la CNT!" (English: "Forward men of the CNT!"). Ascaso quickly advanced towards the box, leaving his comrades behind, and took shelter behind a book stall. He then ran towards a truck, parked on Carrer de Montserrat, and was fired upon by the marksman in the sentry box. He fired back with his pistol and continued on to the truck, but he was shot in the head before he made it. Many others died during the attack, including an Assault Guard captain, four Civil Guards and numerous private citizens, among them a member of the Catalan parliament Amadeu Colldeforns. Historian Antony Beevor argued that many of the casualties during the final assault on the Drassanes barracks were unnecessary, as the anarchists could have used artillery and air support to cover them. He concluded that "the courage of that attack passed into anarchist folklore, obscuring the fact that dash and bravery are dangerous substitutes for military science".

Not long after Ascaso's death, around 13:00, the soldiers inside the Drassanes barracks and the Military Government headquarters surrendered. With the last holdouts vanquished, the workers' militias declared victory over the military coup. The militias then set off up La Rambla, taking the captured officers to be detained at the Transport Workers' Union headquarters. When they passed a barricade, Durruti remarked that the Spanish Revolution had only just started, and that it would not be over until every last rebel soldier in the country was defeated. Sporadic clashes continued to take place in the Catalan capital in the days after the defeat of the coup. When militiamen were shot at by people on the city's rooftops, CNT delegate Jacinto Toryho advised them to conserve their ammunition by not firing back and to instead localise the place where the shots were fired from and search the building for the shooter. On 24 July, with the bulk of the fighting over, the CNT ordered its members to return to work. By the end of the battle, between 450 and 600 people had been killed. An additional 2,000 to 4,000 people were also wounded. Of the dead, 200 were workers fighting on the side of the Republic.

== Aftermath ==
On 20 July 1936, the new Revolutionary Catalonia came under workers' control. Throughout the region, life was reorganised according to workers' self-management, with public transit and food distribution being the first economic sectors to come under social ownership. The Spanish Army and police forces were effectively replaced by armed workers' militias, reflecting the nascent environment of people power. Factories and fields were collectivised, while churches were attacked, looted and burned down. The revolutionary committees, linked together into the so-called "Federation of Barricades", organised to defend the revolution and extend it throughout the country. Their first task was to provide food for Barcelona's 1 million people, through a reciprocal exchange with agricultural producers, and dispatch militias to fight against the Nationalists elsewhere in Spain.

Although the Generalitat de Catalunya remained in place, it was effectively deprived of its monopoly on violence in Catalonia and its chain of command completely broke down. According to Jaume Miravitlles, the state in Catalonia was reduced to only President Companys himself. Federic Escofet, who had himself claimed the credit for neutralising the uprising, met with Companys to discuss the breakdown of state authority and the rise of the anarchists to power. Escofet admitted that they did not have the power to enforce their authority, and after speaking to José Aranguren and Alberto Arrando, he had concluded that it would require them to enter into a bloody battle against those who they had just fought alongside as allies. Believing they would lose such a battle, he advised Companys to maintain the political situation and stay at their posts, which would give them time to regroup their forces and retake Catalonia. After the meeting with Escofet, Companys sought to meet with representatives of all Republican political parties and trade unions, including the CNT-FAI. The first political groupings to offer support to Companys' minimal state against the anarchist revolution were other members of the left-wing Popular Front: the Communist Party of Catalonia (PCC), the Catalan Socialist Federation (FSC), the Proletarian Catalan Party (PCP) and the Socialist Union of Catalonia (USC), which merged together into the Unified Socialist Party of Catalonia (PSUC). Companys decided to broaden the Catalan government to include these parties and held a meeting with their representatives, including Joan Comorera of the USC, Antoni Sesé and Miquel Valdés of the PCC, and Rafael Vidiella of the FSC; also represented were Jaume Aiguader and Josep Tarradellas of the ERC, and Rafael Tasis of Catalan Republican Action (ACR). Everyone at the meeting agreed to the creation of a Popular Front government in Catalonia and the establishment of popular militias. In private, Joan Comorera advised Companys to displace the CNT-FAI from its leading position by driving a wedge between the CNT and UGT. While the anarchists were distracted, the government forces could then build an army, take control of the war effort and the economy, and suppress the revolution.

After the fighting at the Drassanes barracks had drawn to a close, the Nosotros group set off to Carrer dels Mercaders, next to Via Laietana, where the Catalan Regional Committee of the CNT had moved its offices. Outside the heavily guarded office building, the arrival of Durruti and Garcia Oliver caused a stir in the crowd. They passed by Francesc Isgleas, who was on his way to coordinate with the anarchists in Girona. In the small office of the CNT's Regional Secretary Mariano R. Vázquez, the anarchists were informed that President Companys wanted to negotiate with them. The anarchists decided to hold a meeting to consult the membership about the negotiations, calling for every trade union and revolutionary committee to send representatives. Two hours later, the meeting was held at the Casa Cambó, which the CNT had transformed into its regional headquarters after seizing it from the Ministry of Public Works. The debate over Companys' invitation was rushed, as the participants were exhausted after two days of fighting without rest, but showed clear divisions within the anarchist ranks: Joan Garcia Oliver argued that the anarchists proclaim libertarian communism; Diego Abad de Santillán called for collaboration with other anti-fascist political groups; and Manuel Escorza suggested that, rather than negotiating with the government, the workers take control of the Generalitat, use it to bring agriculture and industry under social ownership, then allow it to collapse. As there was no clear response, they ultimately agreed to the meeting with Companys, on the condition that they did not compromise with the government.

Buenaventura Durruti and Joan Garcia Oliver were delegated to meet with Companys. They took a car to Plaça Sant Jaume, where they found the Palace of the Generalitat under heavy guard, with Mossos d'Esquadra manning the entrance and Assault Guards stationed on each of the side streets. The CNT-FAI representatives identified themselves to the Mossos, who greeted them and led them into the Pati dels Tarongers, leaving their armed guard outside. Companys started the meeting by acknowledging the political repression which the Catalan government had previously carried out against the CNT-FAI, as well as his own role in this. He then recognised the anarchists' leading role in defeating the Nationalists and that they now controlled Catalonia. He said that if they no longer needed him as President, then he would resign and join in the fight against the Nationalists; but that if they permitted him to remain in post, then he would pledge his loyalty to them and endeavour to oversee further social progress in Catalonia. The anarchist delegates responded to this by saying only their organisations could make such a decision, and thus that they could not preemptively commit to either course of action. Companys then informed the CNT-FAI representatives of a meeting of other anti-fascist parties happening in another room of the palace, and proposed that they join them in coordinating an executive body to oversee the continuation of the revolution. They agreed and met with the waiting representatives of the ERC, PSOE and POUM, as well as others from the Republican Union (UR) and the Farmers' Union of Catalonia (URC). Companys proposed the creation of a Militia Committee to oversee the reorganisation of the Catalan economy and the organisation of an armed force to fight the Nationalists in other parts of the country.

With the meeting settled, later that night, Companys drafted a decree to establish a popular military junta, which would be answerable to the Catalan Ministry of Defense. The following day, the decree was published in the Butlletí Oficial de la Generalitat de Catalunya. It declared that citizens' militias would be established under the command of Enric Pérez i Farràs and with the defense minister, Lluís Prunés i Sató, as their political commissar. This decree was effectively annulled later that day, when a meeting of the CNT resolved to establish the Central Committee of Antifascist Militias of Catalonia (CCMA), which was to be outside the control of the Catalan government. According to Federica Montseny, in creating the CCMA, the anarchists sought to maintain a united front with other anti-fascist forces, rather than seize power for themselves. At the meeting, Joan Garcia Oliver declared that the anarchists had been presented with a dilemma to either prosecute an "all-embracing" revolution or to accept collaboration with political forces. Garcia Oliver advocated for the anarchists to seize power, but he was opposed by the vast majority of the meeting's participants. Santillán, Montseny and Vázquez all advocated for collaboration, while only the delegates from Baix Llobregat supported Garcia Oliver's proposal. The meeting ultimately resolved to maintain an anti-fascist united front, seeking to avoid the imposition of an anarchist dictatorship. The advocates of collaboration felt their position was justified, as they believed the rest of Spain had already fallen to the Nationalists and that the Levante had thus been left isolated and defenseless, with enemy forces pushing in from Aragon. They concluded that the circumstances called for collaboration with other anti-fascist forces, as without support from the international workers' movement, they would otherwise be alone in their fight against the Nationalists. In order to preserve the revolution, they believed they needed to adapt to the conditions they had found themselves in. The CCMA was thus established as a coalition of anarchist, socialist, Catalan nationalist and republican organisations. On 24 July, it organised the first militia column, the Durruti Column, which was led to the front lines in Aragon by Buenaventura Durruti.

== Bibliography ==
- Alba, Victor; Schwartz, Stephen (1988). "Revolution". Spanish Marxism versus Soviet Communism: A History of the P.O.U.M. Transaction Publishers. pp. 111–170. doi:10.4324/9781315130118-3. ISBN 0-88738-198-7.
- Alexander, Robert J. (1999). The Anarchists in the Spanish Civil War. London: Janus Publishing Company. ISBN 978-1-85756-400-6.
- Alpert, Michael (2019). Franco and the Condor Legion: the Spanish Civil War in the Air. London: Bloomsbury Publishing. ISBN 978-1-78673-563-8. OCLC 1109829190.
- Balcells, Albert (1996). "The Vicissitudes of the Catalan Autonomous Government during the Civil War". In Walker, Geoffrey J. (ed.). Catalan Nationalism: Past and Present. Palgrave Macmillan. pp. 114–124. doi:10.1007/978-1-349-24278-8_11. ISBN 978-1-349-24278-8.
- Beevor, Antony (2006). The Battle for Spain: The Spanish Civil War, 1936-1939. Weidenfeld & Nicolson. ISBN 978-0-14-303765-1.
- Ealham, Chris (2005). "An 'apolitical' revolution". Class, Culture and Conflict in Barcelona 1898–1937. Routledge. pp. 151–172. ISBN 0-203-49355-9.
- Pagès i Blanch, Pelai (2013) [2007]. War and Revolution in Catalonia, 1936–1939. Translated by Gallagher, Patrick. Brill. ISBN 978-90-04-25426-8.
- Paz, Abel (2006) [1996]. Durruti in the Spanish Revolution. Translated by Morse, Chuck. Edinburgh: AK Press. ISBN 1-904859-50-X. LCCN 2006920974. OCLC 482919277.
- Thomas, Hugh (2001) [1961]. The Spanish Civil War. Modern Library. ISBN 0-375-75515-2. OCLC 46640974.
