= Josep Rovira i Canals =

Catalan politician (1902–1968)

Josep Rovira
- Josep Rovira i Canals
- Born: 1902; Rubí, Barcelona, Catalunya, Spain
- Died: 1968 (aged 65–66); Paris, France
- Political party: EC (1926–1932); EC–PP (1932–1933); BOC (1933–1935); POUM (1935–1945); MSC (1945–1968)
- Military career
- Branch: POUM militias (1936-1937); Spanish Republican Army (1937)
- Service years: 1936–1937
- Commands: Lenin Column; 29th Division
- Conflicts: Spanish Civil War: Battle of Barcelona; Huesca Offensive

Josep Rovira i Canals (1902–1968) was a Catalan politician, a leader of the Workers' Party of Marxist Unification (Spanish: Partido Obrero de Unificación Marxista, POUM). During the Spanish Civil War he managed to send several militia units to the Aragon front, and was arrested by the republican authorities in the context of the repression against the POUM.

== Biography ==
=== Political career ===
Josep Rovira i Canals was born into a working-class family, he began working as a bricklayer at the age of 13. Refusing to participate in the Rif War, he defected and went into exile in France. There he met Francesc Macià, with whom he collaborated in the preparation of the plot of Prats de Molló, organized in 1926 by Estat Català.

He returned to Catalunya where his political ideology evolved into revolutionary socialism, so after briefly serving in the Catalan State-Proletarian Party, in January 1933 he joined the Workers and Peasants' Bloc (BOC), led by Joaquín Maurín. In April 1934 he was elected a member of its executive committee.

At that time he was also one of the main organizers of the Ateneu Enciclopèdic Popular of Barcelona. In this center, he met the BOC activist María Manonelles, who became his partner. In 1934 he was in charge of the direction of the weekly "L’Hora", and in October he developed a broad activity at the head of the BOC Action Groups during the Revolution of 1934. In September 1935 the BOC merged with the Communist Left of Spain, giving rise to the Workers' Party of Marxist Unification (Spanish: Partido Obrero de Unificación Marxista, POUM), of which Rovira became a member of the executive committee.

=== Civil War ===
On July 18, 1936, before the coup d'état, he organized, through the Military Committee he directed, the armed intervention of the POUM combat groups, which together with the CNT militias, the Assault Guard and the Civil Guard, defeated the uprising in Barcelona.

On July 21, the Central Committee of Antifascist Militias of Catalonia was created, in which Rovira was elected as a representative of the POUM. In August he marched towards Aragon, where he took command of the party's militia columns fighting on the fronts of Zaragoza and Huesca. He came to lead the Lenin Column, made up of POUM militants. When the militias were militarized, the column became the 29th Division of the Spanish Republican Army, and Rovira remained as its commander until June 1937.

On June 16, 1937, repression was unleashed against the leaders and militants of the POUM, which claimed the life of Andreu Nin. That same day, after participating in the Huesca Offensive, he received an order from the High Command of the Eastern Army to report to the Barcelona headquarters. There he was detained by the police. Following protests by the 24th and 28th divisions, which were fighting alongside the 29th, Indalecio Prieto intervened as Minister of Defense and Rovira ended up being released. However, the 29th Division was dissolved in July as part of the POUM's repression process. Despite this, the officers managed to be assigned to other Army units.

The POUM was reorganized in hiding during the following period of the Spanish Civil War, with Rovira being elected a member of the clandestine Executive Committee. In October 1938 he was again arrested and imprisoned, although he was not included in the judicial process against the POUM, but was instead accused of participating in the May Events and other serious accusations. This process could not be completed due to the entry of the nationalist forces in Barcelona in January 1939. He managed to be released from the Barcelona Model Prison by a POUM commander and fled to France when the nationalists were close to the border.

=== Postwar ===
In exile he participated in the reorganization of the POUM, taking charge of the aid to political prisoners during World War II, organizing a network in collaboration with the French Resistance to cross the Pyrenees with escaped prisoners, Resistance agents and Jews persecuted by the Nazis.

On November 10, 1944, a general conference of the POUM in exile was held in Toulouse. After it, the political evolution of Rovira led him to split, together with a sector of the party, which led to the founding of the Socialist Movement of Catalonia. In 1965, however, he participated in the events commemorating the 30th anniversary of the founding of the POUM. He died in Paris in 1968, his remains being transferred to Catalonia a few years later.

== Bibliography ==
- Alcalá, César (2007). Las checas del terror (in Spanish). Madrid: LibrosLibres. ISBN 978-84-96088-59-7.
- Alexander, Robert J. (1999). The Anarchists in the Spanish Civil War. Vol. I. Janus Publishing Company Lim. ISBN 978-1-85756-412-9.
- Alpert, Michael (2013). The Republican Army in the Spanish Civil War, 1936-1939. Cambridge University Press.
- Casanova, Julián (2010). The Spanish Republic and Civil War. Cambridge University Press. ISBN 9781139490573.
- Thomas, Hugh (1976). Historia de la Guerra Civil Española (in Spanish). Barcelona: Círculo de Lectores. ISBN 9788497598323.
