= 29th Division (Spain) =

Spanish Republican Army formation

- 29.ª División
- Active: April 1937 – August 1937; February 1938 – November 1938
- Country: Spanish Republic
- Allegiance: (Second Spanish Republic) Republican faction
- Branch: Spanish Republican Army
- Type: Infantry
- Size: Division
- Engagements: Spanish Civil War: Huesca Offensive; Battle of Merida pocket

Commanders
- Notable commanders: Josep Rovira i Canals; Miguel García Vivancos

The 29th Division was a military formation belonging to the Spanish Republican Army that fought during the Spanish Civil War. Originally created in 1937 from the militarization of the POUM militia column, it was dissolved and recreated again in early 1938, operating on the Extremadura front.

== History ==
The division was created in April 1937, on the Aragon front, after the militarization of the former militia of the Workers' Party of Marxist Unification (Spanish: Partido Obrero de Unificación Marxista, POUM) - the so-called Lenin Division. The unit, which was under the command of Josep Rovira i Canals, was composed of the 128th and 129th mixed brigades, coming from the former POUM columns. In mid-June, in the context of government repression against the POUM, Rovira was detained by the republican authorities. The command of the unit was assumed by the anarchist Miguel García Vivancos. (Note: Other sources also point to the commander Sebastián Zamora Medina as head of the unit, based in Lleida.) The 29th Division participated in the Huesca Offensive, although it had a mediocre performance. In August, the division ended up being dissolved and reorganized, distributing its former members to other units.

In February 1938, the 29th Division was recreated, under the command of the infantry commander Antonio Rúbert de la Iglesia. The division was integrated into the VII Army Corps, on the Extremadura front. During the month of July, it intervened in the Battle of Merida pocket, of which it would come out bankrupt. As a consequence, it was subjected to a profound reorganization. As of August, it was incorporated into the VI Army Corps.

== Command ==
Commanders

- Josep Rovira i Canals (from April 1937);
- Miguel García Vivancos (from July 1937);
- Antonio Rúbert de la Iglesia (from February 1938);
- Antonio de Blas García; (Note: He assumed command accidentally, between March 30 and April 10, 1938.)
- Fernando Monasterio Bustos (from April 1938);
- José Cirac Laiglesia (from November 1938)

Commissars

- Joaquín Vila Claramunt, of the PSUC (from February 1938);
- Benigno Alonso de Dios, of the PCE (from August 1938);
- Froilán Nanclares Cocho (from March 1939)

Chiefs of Staff

- Enrique Trigo Bru (from February 1938);
- Luis Recuenco Gómez (from April 1938);

== Order of battle ==
Date	Attached Army Corps	Integrated Mixed Brigades	Battle front
May 1937	X Army Corps	128th and 129th	Aragon
February 1938	VII Army Corps	46th, 62nd and 109th	Estremadura
March 1938	VII Army Corps	46th, 104th and 109th	Estremadura
April 30, 1938	VII Army Corps	46th, 109th and 210th	Estremadura
July 1938	VII Army Corps	25th, 46th and 109th	Estremadura
July 18, 1938	VII Army Corps	25th and 109th	Estremadura
August 1938	VI Army Corps	44th, 46th and 109th	Estremadura
October 23, 1938	VI Army Corps	46th, 148th and 192nd	Estremadura
November 1938	VI Army Corps	46th, 109th and 194th	Estremadura

== Bibliography ==
- Alpert, Michael (1989). El ejército republicano en la guerra civil (in Spanish). Siglo XXI Editores.
- Álvarez, Santiago (1989). Los comisarios políticos en el Ejército Popular de la República (in Spanish). Ediciós do Castro.
- Casanova, Julián (1985). Anarquismo y revolución en la sociedad rural aragonesa, 1936-1938 (in Spanish). Siglo XXI Editores.
- Engel, Carlos (1999). Historia de las Brigadas Mixtas del Ejército Popular de la República (in Spanish). Madrid: Almena. ISBN 84-922644-7-0.
- Maldonado, José M.ª (2007). El frente de Aragón. La Guerra Civil en Aragón (1936–1938) (in Spanish). Mira Editores. ISBN 978-84-8465-237-3.
- Martínez Bande, José Manuel (1981). La batalla de Pozoblanco y el cierre de la bolsa de Mérida (in Spanish). Madrid: San Martín.
- M. Lorenzo, César (1972). Los Anarquistas españoles y el poder 1868-1969 (in Spanish). Ruedo Ibérico.
- Thomas, Hugh (1976). Historia de la Guerra Civil Española (in Spanish). Barcelona: Círculo de Lectores. ISBN 9788497598323.
