= Villar del Pedroso =

- Municipality
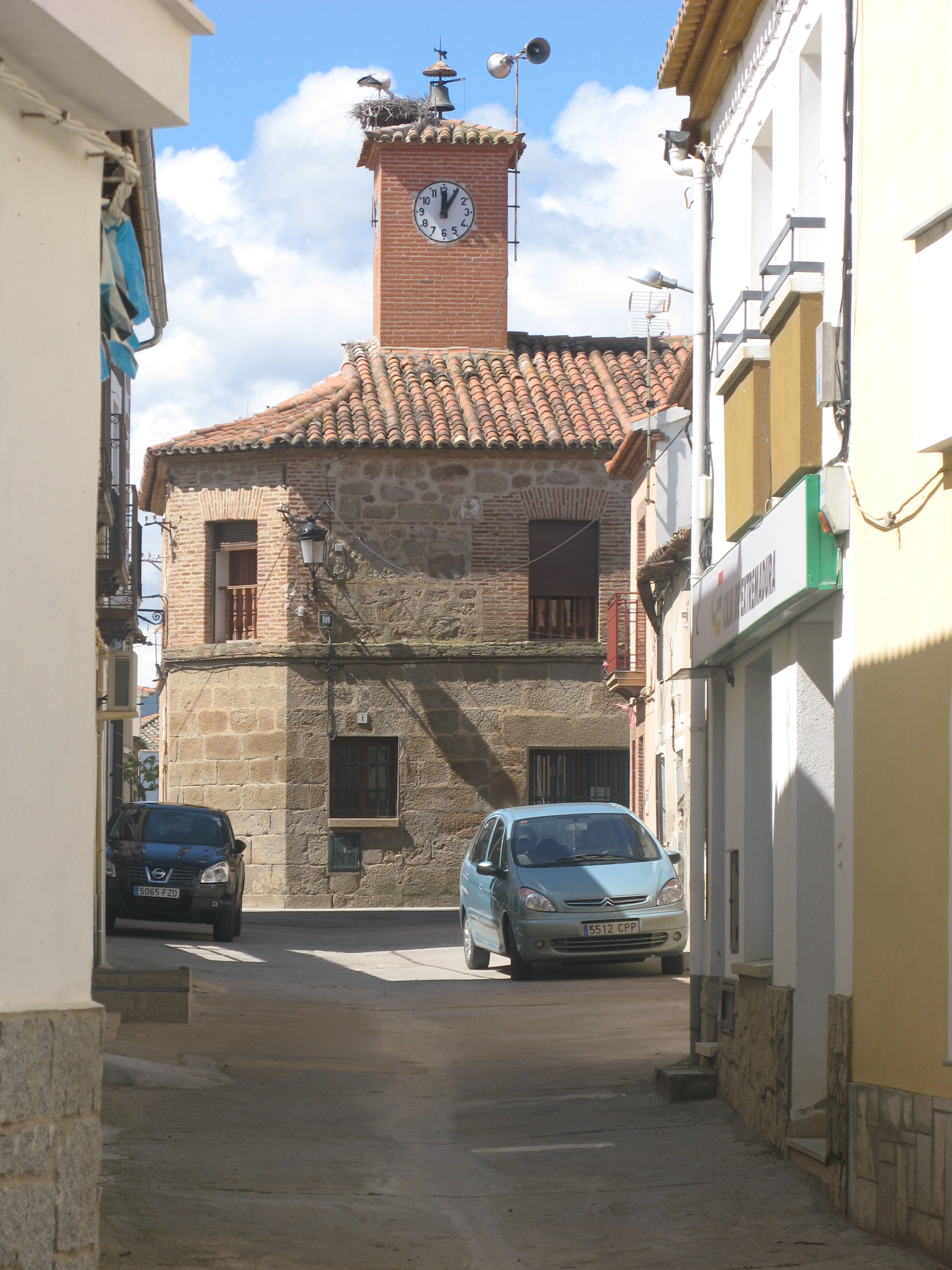
- Town hall

- Coat of arms

- Location in Spain
- Coordinates: 39°42′N 5°11′W
- Country: Spain
- Autonomous community: Extremadura
- Province: Cáceres
- Municipality: Villar del Pedroso

Area
  - Total: 242 km^{2} (93 sq mi)
- Elevation: 732 m (2,402 ft)

Population (2025-01-01)
  - Total: 547
  - Density: 2.26/km^{2} (5.85/sq mi)
- Time zone: UTC+1 (CET)
  - Summer (DST): UTC+2 (CEST)

Villar del Pedroso is a municipality located in the province of Cáceres, Extremadura, Spain. According to the 2014 census, the municipality has a population of 639 inhabitants.

== Villages ==
- Navatrasierra, located in the Sierra de Altamira, with 198 inhabitants.

== See also ==
- List of municipalities in Cáceres
