= José Aranguren =

Spanish general (1875–1939)

General José Aranguren
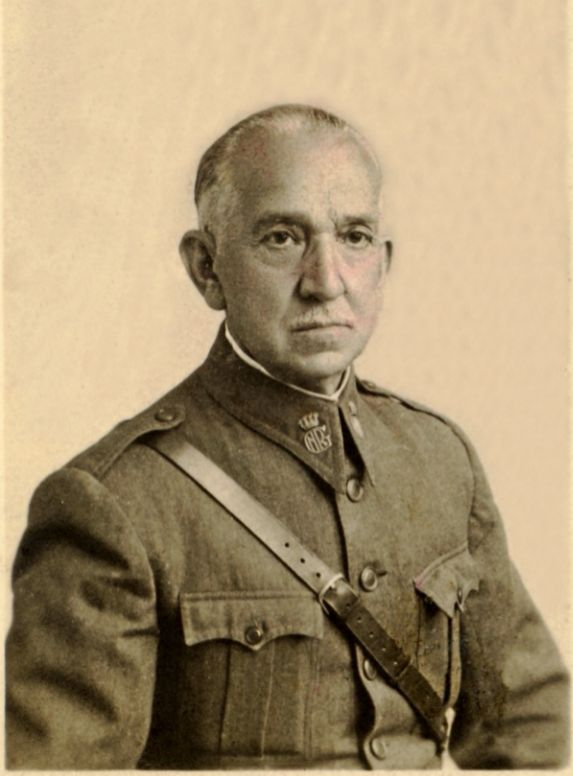
- Born: 1875; Ferrol, Spain
- Died: 22 April 1939 (aged 63–64) Barcelona, Spain
- Cause of death: Execution by firing squad
- Allegiance: Spanish Republic
- Branch: Spanish Republican Army
- Service years: ?–1939
- Rank: General
- Commands: Guardia Civil
- Conflicts: Spanish Civil War

José Aranguren (1875 – 22 April 1939) was a Republican general during the Spanish Civil War. From Ferrol, he commanded the Guardia Civil. After the Nationalist victory, he was court-martialed and sentenced to death, being executed by firing squad in Barcelona.
