= Catalan State-Proletarian Party =

Catalan State-Proletarian Party Estat Català-Partit Proletari
- Abbreviation: EC-PP
- Founded: 9 October 1932
- Dissolved: January 1934
- Split from: Estat Català
- Merged into: Proletarian Catalan Party
- Headquarters: Barcelona
- Newspaper: L'Insurgent
- Ideology: Socialism; Catalanism; Catalan independence; Antifascism; Marxism
- Political position: Left-wing
- Colors: Red; Yellow

Catalan State-Proletarian Party (Catalan: Estat Català-Partit Proletari, EC-PP) was a communist political party in Catalonia, Spain. Following a 1932 split in Estat Català (EC) over merging into the Republican Left of Catalonia, the left-wing Separatist Force of the Far-Left (Catalan: Força Separatista d’Extrema Esquerra) sector of the party that opposed the merger formed EC-PP.

Leaders of EC-PP were Jaume Compte, Ramon Fabregat, Pere Aznar and Artur Cussó. EC-PP published L'Insurgent.

EC-PP made fruitless attempts to rally other forces to join a united party, and, in the end, it launched the Proletarian Catalan Party (January 1934).
