= Proletarian Catalan Party =

Proletarian Catalan Party Partit Català Proletari
- President: Jaume Compte
- Founded: 1934
- Dissolved: 1936
- Newspaper: Catalunya Insurgent
- Youth wing: Joventuts del Partit Català Proletari
- Membership: 500–800
- Ideology: Communism; Leninism; Catalan independence
- Political position: Left-wing
- Colours: Red
- Congreso de los Diputados (1936): 1 / 350

Proletarian Catalan Party (Catalan: Partit Català Proletari, 1934–1936) was a political party in Catalonia, Spain. PCP was founded in January 1934. Its main leader was Jaume Compte. PCP had its origins in the Estat Català-Partit Proletari, founded in 1932.

The goal of PCP was the creation of a Catalan Socialist Republic.

The party had a large influence with the trade union Centre Autonomista de Dependents de Comerç i Industria (CADCI). In 1936 Peres Aznar, a PCP deputy in the Cortes, was elected president of CADCI.

The party had around 500–800 members at its peak, mainly from Barcelona. PCP published Catalunya Insurgent. Its youth wing was known as Joventuts del Partit Català Proletari.

In 1936 PCP merged with other groups to form the Unified Socialist Party of Catalonia.
