= Carrascalejo =

- Municipality
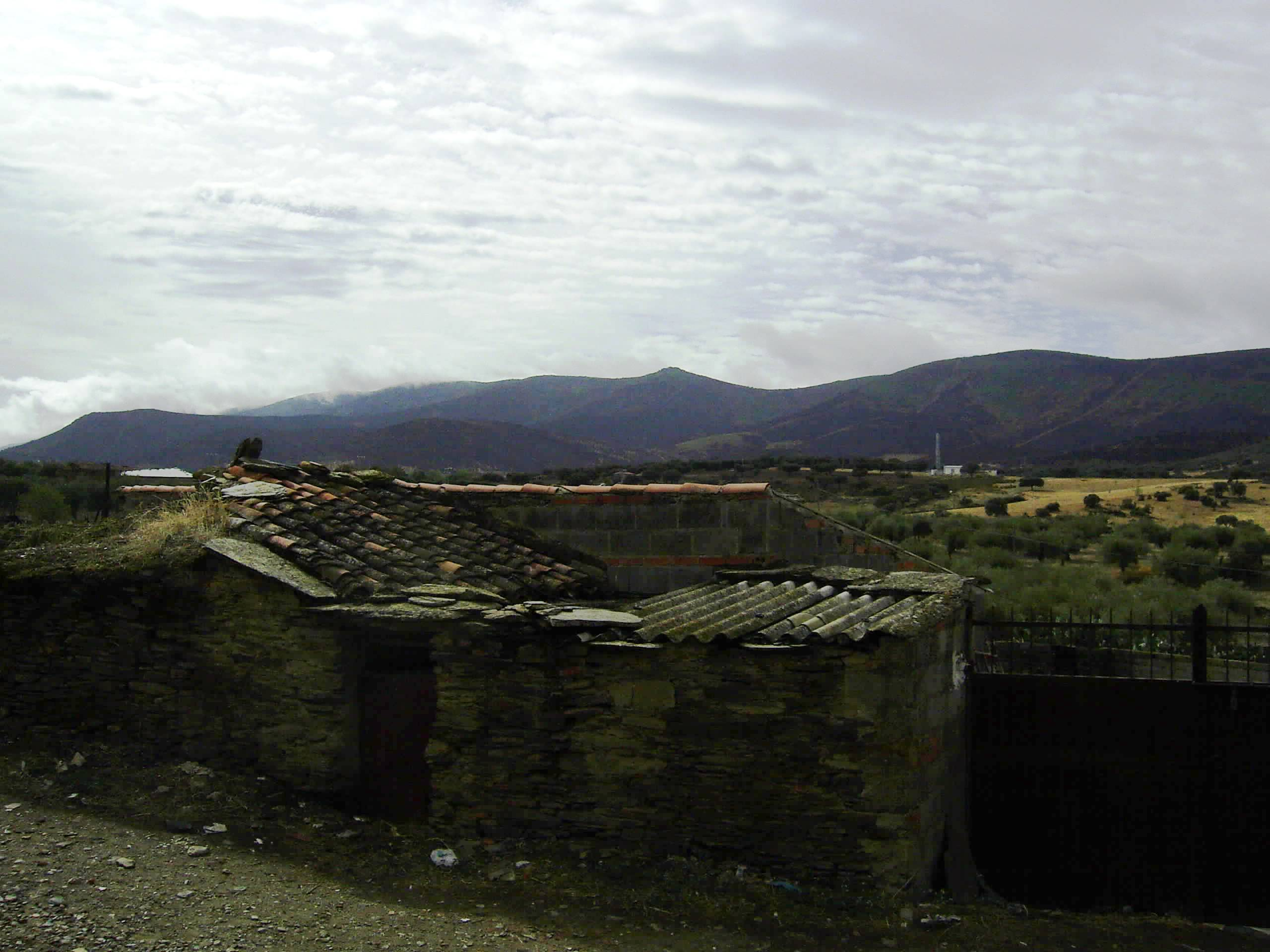
- Carrascalejo with the Sierra de Altamira in the background

- Coat of arms

- Location in Spain
- Coordinates: 39°38′N 5°13′W
- Country: Spain
- Autonomous community: Extremadura
- Province: Cáceres
- Municipality: Carrascalejo

Area
  - Total: 48 km^{2} (19 sq mi)
- Elevation: 607 m (1,991 ft)

Population (2025-01-01)
  - Total: 223
- Time zone: UTC+1 (CET)
  - Summer (DST): UTC+2 (CEST)

Carrascalejo is a municipality located in the province of Cáceres, Extremadura, Spain. According to the 2014 census, the municipality has a population of 273 inhabitants.

== See also ==
- List of municipalities in Cáceres
