= Navatrasierra =

- Village
- Flag Seal

- Location of Navatrasierra in Extremadura Location of Navatrasierra in Spain.
- Coordinates: 39°36′21″N 5°14′35″W
- Country: Spain
- Autonomous community: Extremadura
- Province: Cáceres
- Comarca: La Jara Cacereña

Area
  - Total: 100 km^{2} (39 sq mi)
- Elevation: 730 m (2,400 ft)

Population (2014)
  - Total: 198
  - Density: 2.0/km^{2} (5.1/sq mi)
- Time zone: UTC+1 (CET)
  - Summer (DST): UTC+2 (CEST)

Navatrasierra is a village that is part of the Villar del Pedroso municipality in the province of Cáceres, Extremadura, Spain. According to the 2014 census, the village has a population of 198 inhabitants.

== Geography ==
Navatrasierra is located in a mountainous area between the Sierra de Altamira in the northeast and the Sierra del Hospital del Obispo; the latter's highest peak is 1443 m high. These ranges are part of the Montes de Toledo system.

The Navatrasierra Shale Formation from the Ordovician period, is named after this town.

== Local celebrations ==
- Santo Tomás Apóstol, on 21 December

== See also ==
- List of fossiliferous stratigraphic units in Spain
