= Revolutionary Catalonia =

Anarchist Catalonia during the Spanish Civil War

Revolutionary Catalonia Catalunya revolucionària (Catalan)
- 1936–1937
- Above: Red and black CNT-FAI flag Below: Flag of Catalonia Seal of the Generalitat

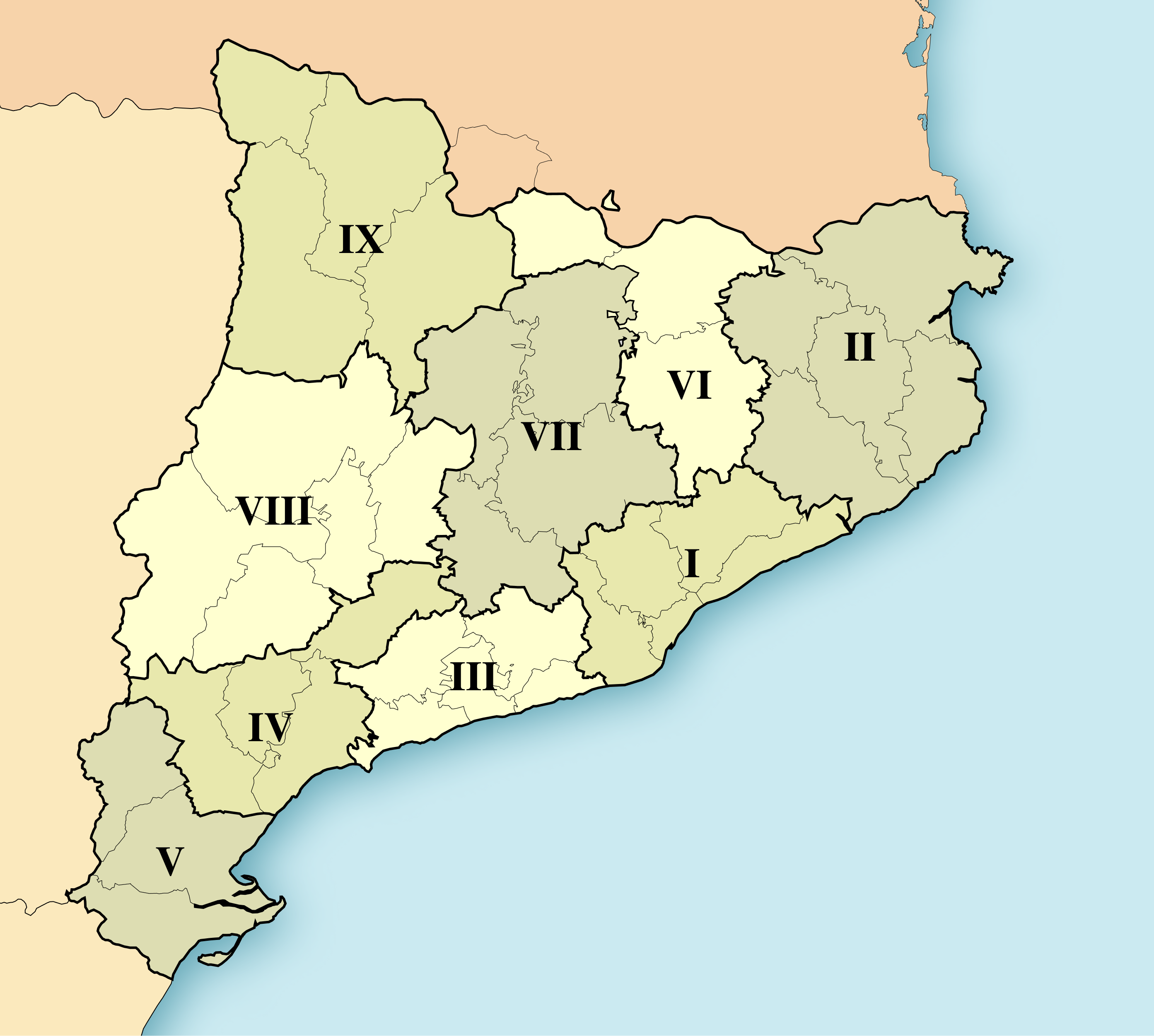
- Territorial division of Catalonia according to the decree of the Generalitat of October 1936
- Status: De facto: Quasi-state with Anarcho-syndicalist features De jure: Autonomous region within a constitutional republic
- Capital: Barcelona
- Common languages: Catalan, Spanish
- Government: De facto: Anarcho-syndicalism; De jure: Generalitat of Catalonia
- President of the Generalitat
  - 1936–1939: Lluís Companys
- Legislature: Central Committee of Antifascist Militias of Catalonia (1936); Parliament of Catalonia (1936–1939)
- Historical era: Spanish Civil War
  - Established: 21 July 1936
  - CCMA disbanded: 1 October 1936
  - May Days: 3–8 May 1937
  - Fall of Catalonia: 10 February 1939
Preceded by	Succeeded by
Second Spanish Republic; Generalitat of Catalonia	Spanish State
- Today part of: Spain ∟Catalonia

Revolutionary Catalonia (21 July 1936 – 8 May 1937) was the period in which the autonomous region of Catalonia in northeast Spain was controlled or largely influenced by various anarchist, syndicalist, communist, and socialist trade unions, parties, and militias of the Spanish Civil War era. Although the constitutional Catalan institution of self-government, the Generalitat of Catalonia (led by the Republican Left of Catalonia, ERC), remained in power and even took control of most of the competences of the Spanish central government in its territory, the trade unions were de facto in command of most of the economy and military forces, which includes the Confederación Nacional del Trabajo (CNT, National Confederation of Labor) which was the dominant labor union at the time and the closely associated Federación Anarquista Ibérica (FAI, Iberian Anarchist Federation). The Unión General de Trabajadores (UGT, General Worker's Union), the POUM (Workers' Party of Marxist Unification) and the Unified Socialist Party of Catalonia (PSUC, which included the former Communist Party of Catalonia) were also prominent.

Socialist rule of the region began with the Spanish Revolution of 1936, resulting in workers' control of businesses and factories, collective farming in most of the countryside, and attacks against Spanish nationalists and the Catholic clergy. The growing influence of the Communist Party of Spain (PCE) in the Popular Front government and their desire to nationalize revolutionary committees and militias brought it into conflict with the CNT and POUM, resulting in the May Days and the eventual replacement of the CNT by the PSUC as a major political force in Catalonia until their defeat to the Nationalist forces in 1939.

== History ==
=== Background ===
In the early 20th century, the popularity of socialism and anarchism grew throughout Spain. There was widespread discontent in Catalonia, which was heavily industrialized and was a stronghold of the anarcho-syndicalist trade unions. A series of strikes due to wage cuts and in response to military conscription for the Second Rif War in Morocco culminated in the Tragic Week (25 July – 2 August 1909) in which workers rose up in revolt and were suppressed by the army. The anarcho-syndicalist Confederación Nacional del Trabajo (CNT) was formed in October 1910 and immediately called for a general strike, which was suppressed by the military. Further strikes followed in 1917 and 1919 amidst growing violence between the police and trade unions. With the CNT outlawed, the Federación Anarquista Ibérica (FAI) was formed in 1927 as a clandestine alliance of affinity groups during the dictatorship of Miguel Primo de Rivera. Its radical members, who were also part of the CNT, exerted considerable influence on the other members of the trade union. During the Second Spanish Republic, anarchists continued to lead uprisings such as the Casas Viejas revolt in 1933 and the Asturian miners' strike of 1934 which was brutally put down by Francisco Franco with the aid of Moorish troops.

=== Beginning of the war ===
Organization chart of the Central Committee of Antifascist Militias of Catalonia, 1936

During the Spanish coup of July 1936, anarchist and socialist militias, along with Republican forces including the Assault and Civil Guards, defeated the forces controlled by Nationalist army officers in Catalonia and parts of eastern Aragon. The Confederación Nacional del Trabajo-Federación Anarquista Ibérica now came to the forefront as the most powerful organization in Barcelona, seizing many arms and strategic buildings such as the telephone exchange and post offices. Through the various factory and transport committees, they dominated the economy of Catalonia. In spite of their historically militant anti-statist positions, they decided not to overthrow the Catalan government. The president of the Generalitat of Catalonia and head of the Republican Left of Catalonia (ERC), Lluís Companys, was generally accommodating with the CNT but was wary of their appropriation of the means of production. The CNT and others worked together to set up the Central Committee of Antifascist Militias, which became the main governing body in the region.

=== Anarchists enter the government ===
Caballero government ministers (November 1936) from left to right: Jaume Aguadé i Miró (Republican Left of Catalonia), Federica Montseny (CNT-FAI), Juan García Oliver (CNT-FAI) and Anastasio de Gracia (Spanish Socialist Workers' Party)

By September 1936 the CNT-FAI had decided to join the Generalitat of Catalonia, drawing condemnation from more militant anarchist sections of the organization. The CNT feared that arms would be withheld and that they would be isolated if the Generalitat under Lluís Companys formed a government with the Unified Socialist Party of Catalonia (PSUC). CNT members filled the Ministries of Health, Supplies and Economy and the Central Anti-Fascist Militia Committee was dissolved.

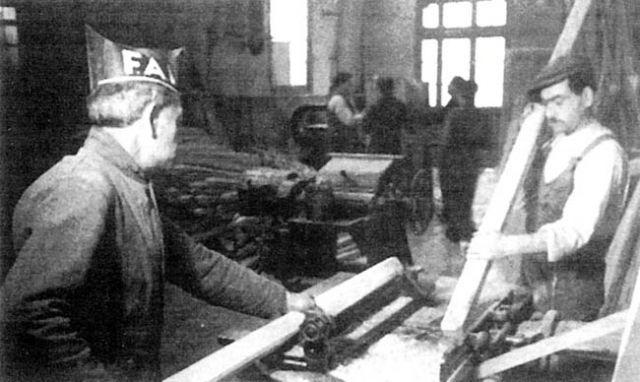
CNT-FAI worker cooperative in Barcelona producing wood and steel products

Soon after, the CNT also joined the national government. On 18 October, a CNT plenary session of the regional federations granted the national committee secretary Horacio Martínez Prieto full powers to conduct negotiations with prime minister Francisco Largo Caballero. CNT representatives Juan García Oliver, Joan Peiró, Federica Montseny and Juan López filled seats in Caballero's cabinet. They took control of the national ministry of justice, industry, health and commerce, respectively. The CNT saw this "maximum concession compatible with its antiauthoritarian spirit" as crucial to winning the war. There was widespread friction and debate between the "collaborationist" and "abstentionist" anarchists in the CNT. Many anarchists outside of Spain (such as Alexander Schapiro) criticized CNT-FAI for entering into the government. There was also concern among anarchists with the growing power of Marxist communists within the government. Anarchist Minister of Health Federica Montseny later explained: "At that time we only saw the reality of the situation created for us: the communists in the government and ourselves outside, the manifold possibilities, and all our achievements endangered."

Some anarchists outside of Spain viewed their concessions as necessary considering the possibility of the Nationalists winning the war. Emma Goldman said, "With Franco at the gate of Madrid, I could hardly blame the CNT-FAI for choosing a lesser evil: participation in government rather than dictatorship, the most deadly evil."

=== 1936 Revolution and worker's self management ===
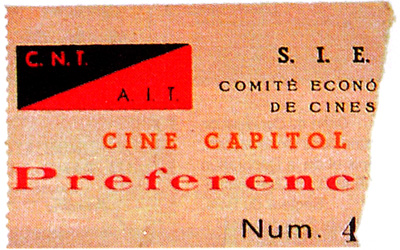
Cinema ticket from a venue run by the CNT

Throughout Catalonia many sectors of the economy fell under the control of the anarchist CNT and the socialist UGT trade unions, where workers' self-management was implemented. These included railways, streetcars, buses, taxicabs, shipping, electric light and power companies, gasworks and waterworks, engineering and automobile assembly plants, mines, mills, factories, food-processing plants, theaters, newspapers, bars, hotels, restaurants, department stores, and thousands of dwellings previously owned by the upper classes. While the CNT was the leading organization in Catalonia, it often shared power with the UGT. For example, control of the Spanish National telephone company, was put under a joint CNT-UGT committee.

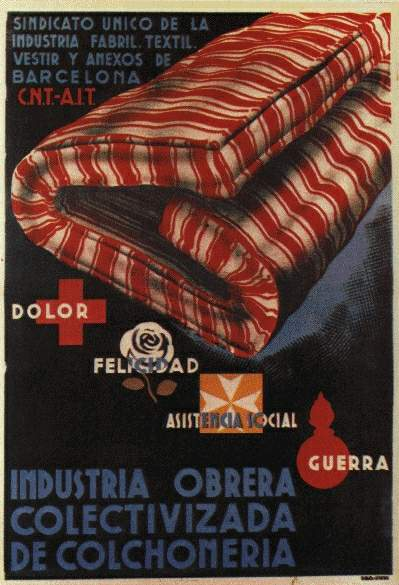
CNT poster promoting collectivized Textiles

Trade union control also spread to small businesses of the middle class handicraft men and tradesmen. In Barcelona, the CNT collectivized the sale of fish and eggs, slaughterhouses, milk processing and the fruit and vegetable markets, suppressing all dealers and sellers that were not part of the collective. Many retailers joined the collectives but others refused, wanting higher wages than the workers. Throughout the region, the CNT committees replaced the middle class distributors and traders in many businesses including retailers and wholesalers, hotel, café, and bar owners, opticians and doctors, barbers and bakers. Though the CNT tried to persuade the members of the middle class and small bourgeoisie to join the revolution, they were generally unwelcoming to the revolutionary changes wanting expropriation of their businesses under violence or threat of violence and a worker's wage.

Initially, the newly collectivized factories encountered various problems. CNT member Albert Pérez-Baró describes the initial economic confusion:

After the first few days of euphoria, the workers returned to work and found themselves without responsible management. This resulted in the creation of workers' committees in factories, workshops and warehouses, which tried to resume production with all the problems that a transformation of this kind entailed. Owing to inadequate training and the sabotage of some of the technicians who remained many others had fled with the owners the workers' committees and other bodies that were improvised had to rely on the guidance of the unions.... Lacking training in economic matters, the union leaders, with more good will than success, began to issue directives that spread confusion in the factory committees and enormous chaos in production. This was aggravated by the fact that each union... gave different and often contradictory instruction.

In response to these problems, the Generalitat of Catalonia, backed by the CNT approved a decree on "Collectivization and Workers' Control" on 24 October 1936. Under this decree all firms with more than 100 workers were to be collectivized and those with 100 or less could be collectivized if a majority of workers agreed. All collectivized enterprises were to join general industrial councils, which would be represented in a decentralized planning agency, the Economic Council of Catalonia. Representatives of the Generalitat would be appointed by the CNT to these regional councils. The goal of this new form of organization would be to allow economic planning for civilian and military needs and stop the selfishness of more prosperous industries by using their profits to help others. However these plans for libertarian socialism based on trade unions were opposed by the socialists and communists who wanted a nationalized industry, as well as by unions which did not want to give up their profits to other businesses. Another problem faced by the CNT was that while many collectivized firms were bankrupt, they refused to use the banks because the financial institutions were under the control of the socialist UGT. As a result of this, many were forced to seek government aid, appealing to Juan Peiró, the CNT minister of industry. Socialists and Communists in the government however, prevented Peiró from making any move which promoted collectivization.

After the initial disruption, the unions soon began an overall reorganization of all trades, closing down hundreds of smaller plants and focusing on those few better equipped ones, improving working conditions. In the region of Catalonia, more than seventy foundries were closed down, and production concentrated around twenty four larger foundries. The CNT argued that the smaller plants were less efficient and secure. In Barcelona, 905 smaller beauty shops and barbershops were closed down, their equipment and workers being focused on 212 larger shops.

There were early issues with production in certain instances, however, Emma Goldman attested that industrial productivity doubled almost everywhere across the country, with agricultural yields increased "30–50%".

Anarchic communes often produced more than before the collectivization. The newly liberated zones worked on entirely libertarian principles; decisions were made through councils of ordinary citizens without any sort of bureaucracy. The CNT-FAI leadership was at this time not nearly as radical as the rank and file members responsible for these sweeping changes.

Another aspect of the revolution was the rise of an anarcha-feminist women's movement, the Mujeres Libres. The organization, with 30,000 members at its disposal, set up schools to educate women and worked to persuade prostitutes to give up their way of life. The anarcha-feminists argued that overthrow of patriarchal society was just as necessary for personal freedom, as the creation of a classless society. To demonstrate this new sexual equality, some women even fought at the front (no more than one thousand) and several more joined women's battalions in the rear. However, Michael Seidman argues that sexism was still present – in some collectives women were still paid less than men and could be denied voting rights, while single women could be expelled from a collective (as they lacked a more productive husband for farm labor). Some sexist male leaders deemed women to simply be lacking in commitment to revolutionary principles. However, Seidman also argues that women could still benefit from the collectives; young women enjoyed the relative freedom from religious domination, particularly when it came to sexuality and education, that collectivisation brought to certain villages.

==== Rural collectivization ====
Just as in the cities, peasant revolutionaries seized land in the countryside and organized collective farms. According to professor Edward E. Malefakis, between half and two-thirds of all cultivated land in Republican Spain was seized. The targets were mainly small and medium landholders, since most of the large landholdings had fallen to the nationalists. However, historian Michael Seidman argues that while collectivisation was prominent, it was still a minority practice. Seidman argues that most peasants opted for individual farming and collectives tended to exist within a sea of small- and medium-property holders and that even within the region of Aragon, which was considered more revolutionary than Catalonia and a CNT stronghold, only about 40% of land was collectivised.

Collectivization in the countryside generally began with the establishment of CNT-FAI committees. These committees collectivized the soil of the rich and in some cases the soil of the poor as well. Farm buildings, machinery, transport and livestock were also collectivized. Food reserves and other amenities were stored in a communal depot under committee control. In many localities, the local committee issued its own inconvertible paper money; wages were paid with this money, the size of which was determined by the size of the family. Locally produced goods were free if abundant, or bought at the communal storage. State issued convertible money was only used in trade with regions that had not adopted this system, and trade with other anarchist regions was done by barter. Since the committee controlled all the money supply, travel to another region required getting permission and convertible money from the committee.

For the CNT, collectivization was a key component of the revolution, they feared that the small holders and tenant farmers would form the core of a new landholding class and act as an obstacle to the revolution. The Anarchists also believed that private ownership of land created a bourgeois mentality and led to exploitation. While the official policy of the CNT was that of peaceful voluntary collectivization and many small farmers and peasant proprietors voluntarily joined the collectives, a larger proportion of them opposed collectivization or joined only after extreme duress. The presence of armed CNT militiamen also had the effect of imposing fear on those who opposed collectivization. Those smallholders who refused collectivization were prevented from hiring any laborers and usually were forced to sell their crops directly to the committees, on their terms. They were also often denied the services of the collectivized businesses such as the barbershops and bakeries, use of communal transport, farm equipment and food supplies from communal warehouses. All of these economic pressures combined caused many tenant farmers and smallholders to give up their land and join the collectives.

While some joined voluntarily, others, especially in the beginning of the revolution, were forced to join the collectives by anarchist militias. The anarcho-syndicalist periodical Solidaridad Obrera reported that: "Certain abuses have been committed that we consider counterproductive. We know that certain irresponsible elements have frightened the small peasants and that up to now a certain apathy has been noted in their daily labors."

The voluntary nature of the rural collectivization varied from region to region. According to Ralph Bates: "While there were plenty of abuses, forced collectivization, etc., there were plenty of good collectives, i.e., voluntary ones." The anarchist Emma Goldman noted how workers in collectives saw it their duty to convince their fellow workers that common labor was superior, writing:

In their natural wisdom, our Albalate de Cinca comrades reasoned that it was their duty to demonstrate the superior quality of work in common. They told me "once we can prove to our brothers that collective labor saves time and energy, and brings greater results to each member of the collective, the peasants now standing aloof will join us."

A number of scholars and writers on the subject of the Spanish Civil War counter that the presence of a "coercive climate" was an unavoidable aspect of the war that the anarchists cannot be fairly blamed for, and that the presence of deliberate coercion or direct force was minimal, as evidenced by a generally peaceful mixture of collectivists and individualist dissenters who had opted not to participate in collective organization. The latter sentiment is expressed by historian Antony Beevor in his Battle for Spain: The Spanish Civil War, 1936–1939.

The justification for this operation (whose 'very harsh measures' shocked even some Party members) was that since all the collectives had been established by force, Líster was merely liberating the peasants. There had undoubtedly been pressure, and no doubt force was used on some occasions in the fervor after the rising. But the very fact that every village was a mixture of collectivists and individualists shows that the peasants had not been forced into communal farming at the point of a gun.

Historian Graham Kelsey also maintains that the anarchist collectives were primarily maintained through libertarian principles of voluntary association and organization, and that the decision to join and participate was generally based on a rational and balanced choice made after the destabilization and effective absence of capitalism as a powerful factor in the region, saying:

Libertarian communism and agrarian collectivization were not economic terms or social principles enforced upon a hostile population by special teams of urban anarchosyndicalists, but a pattern of existence and a means of rural organization adopted from agricultural experience by rural anarchists and adopted by local committees as the single most sensible alternative to the part-feudal, part-capitalist mode of organization that had just collapsed.

There is also focus placed by pro-anarchist analysts on the many decades of organization and shorter period of CNT-FAI agitation that was to serve as a foundation for high membership levels throughout anarchist Spain, which is often referred to as a basis for the popularity of the anarchist collectives, rather than any presence of force or coercion that allegedly compelled unwilling persons to involuntarily participate.

Michael Seidman observes that in contrast to the Soviet experience, many collectives were voluntary and bottom-up. However, there was also an element of coercion – the terror and upheaval encouraged reluctant individuals to obey radical authorities. In addition, it was not uncommon for collectives to effectively boycott non-members, compelling them to join unless they wished to face a great deal of struggle otherwise. Property holders resented the seizure of their land and the prohibition on employing wage labor. However, Seidman notes while there was coercion, many rural Spaniards also joined willingly out of a belief that they would enjoy the good-life that was promised by various forms of socialism and communism.

Seidman also observes that peasants were not always as revolutionary or ideological as the anarchists would like; families might join a collective not because they agreed with its principles but rather to receive better rations. More individualistic sharecroppers would abandon collectives. Anarchists expressed frustration that peasants were more interested in what they could gain from the collective than commitment to revolutionary ideals. On a larger scale, Seidman argues that while collectives may have encouraged solidarity internally, on a local scale they contributed towards organised selfishness. Collectives encouraged autarky and self-sufficiency, refusing to share with other collectives. CNT officials lamented the "egotism" of the collectives, finding that the collectives were resistant to control (driven by fears that CNT officials would exploit them, which Seidman argues was not always an unreasonable fear). Due to wartime inflation and economic problems, the Republican government struggled to incentivise the collectives to follow their policies.

The disillusioned middle classes soon found allies in the Communist party which was quite moderate in comparison to the CNT, was generally against the mass collectivization of the revolution and called for the property of smallholders and tradesmen to be respected. They defended the right of the small proprietor to hire laborers and to control the sale of his crops without interference from the local committees. This moderate Communist appeal to the middle classes was in line with the Comintern strategy for a popular front alliance with the liberal and republican center parties. However, in some cases efforts by Communists to undermine collectives may actually have been a case of Communist soldiers simply looting the collectives for supplies, as wartime disrupted logistics and soldiers resented what they regarded as extortionate peasant prices.

The collectives also suffered internal difficulties, particularly as the war dragged on. Unproductive members were an increasing concern and collectives implemented rules about who could join the collective in response. The status of the elderly, orphans, the disabled and widows were particularly divisive issues due to the reduced productivity of these members. Family size became a problem, as families were paid a wage according to the number of children they had and large families would take advantage of the collective's services, which proved to be a financial burden that smaller families resented having to support. Some social groups were also disliked and distrusted by the collectives – Roma were seen as a burden and lacking in revolutionary participation. Refugees to a collective were also a problem, as existing members sometimes regarded themselves as more in tune with the collectivist spirit and felt that the refugees were a burden, at times reacting with hostility to independent efforts by newer members, while the refugees thought they were victims of discrimination. Tensions could also erupt between workers and those in charge of managing output, as well as disputes over how much work members were required to put towards the collective.

According to historian Stanley Payne, the social effects of the revolution were less drastic than the economic ones; while there were some social changes in larger urban areas (Barcelona emphasised a "proletarian style" and Catalonia set up inexpensive abortion facilities), the attitudes of the lower classes remained fairly conservative and there was comparatively little emulation of Russian-style "revolutionary morality".

==== Revolutionary militias and the regular army ====
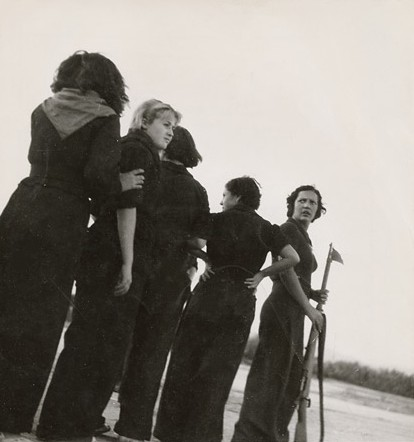
Women training for a Republican militia outside Barcelona in August 1936

After the military rebellion, the Republic was left with a decimated officer corps and a severely weakened army in the regions it still controlled. Since the army was unable to resist the rebellion, the fighting mainly fell to the militia units organized by the various labor unions. While army officers joined these columns, they were under the control of whichever organization had formed them. The militias suffered from a wide variety of problems. They were inexperienced and lacked discipline and unity of action. Rivalry between the various organizations exacerbated the lack of any centralized command and general staff. The appointed professional officers were not always respected. They also lacked heavy weapons. Militiamen would often leave the front whenever they wished. Republican officer Major Aberri said of the militiamen he encountered at the Aragon front: "It was the most natural thing in the world for them to leave the front when it was quiet. They knew nothing of discipline, and it was clear that nobody had bothered to instruct them on the subject. After a forty-hour week at the front they got bored and left it".

In the initial months the ministry of war had little authority over transport and was forced to rely on the National Committee of Road Transport controlled by the CNT and UGT. The committees, unions and parties widely disregarded demands from the ministry of war and retained equipment and vehicles for themselves and their own militia forces. In the CNT militias especially, there was no hierarchy, no saluting, no titles, uniforms or distinction in pay and quartering. They were organized into centuries with democratically elected leaders that had no permanent authority.

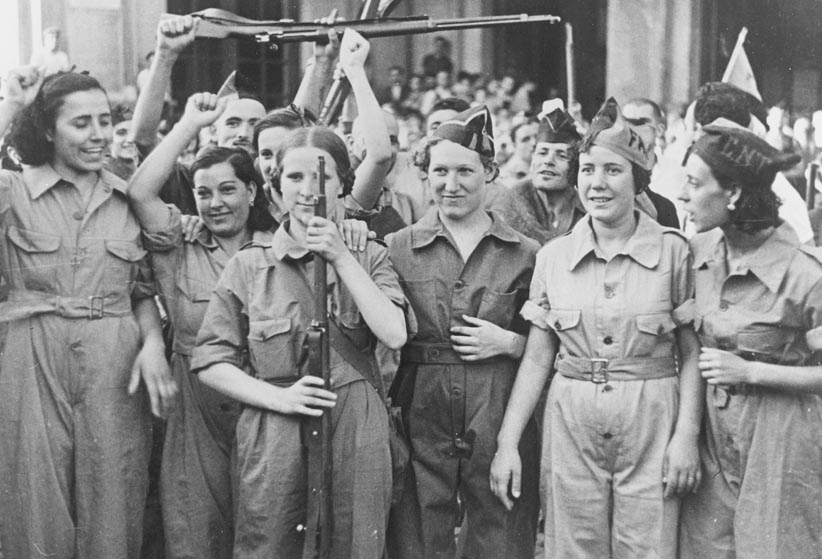
Catalan militiawomen of the CNT union, 1937

The column began with 3,000 troops but at its peak, was made up of about 8,000 people. They had a difficult time getting arms from a suspicious Republican government, so Durruti and his men compensated by seizing unused arms from government stockpiles. Durruti's death on 20 November 1936, weakened the Column in spirit and tactical ability; they were eventually incorporated, by decree, into the regular army. Over a quarter of the population of Barcelona attended Durruti's funeral. It is still uncertain how Durruti died. According to Durruti: The People Armed by Abel Paz, Durruti was hit by gunfire from a hospital taken over by Nationalists while he was unarmed and fleeing. Another account of Durruti's death is given in Antony Beevor's The Spanish Civil War where it is stated that Durruti was killed when a comrade's machine pistol went off due to careless handling. Beevor assessed that anarchists at the time claimed Durruti was killed by a Nationalist sniper "for reasons of morale and propaganda".

Because of the need to create a centralized military, the Communist party was in favor of establishing a regular army and integrating the militias into this new force. They were the first party to dissolve their militia forces, including the fifth regiment, one of the most effective units in the war, and create mixed brigades, forming the core of the new Popular Army. These units were firmly under the oversight of Communist party commissars and under the command of experienced army officers. The Communist party eventually came to dominate the leadership of the new army through their commissars, who used any means at their disposal, including violence and death threats, to increase party membership. Soviet army advisers and NKVD agents also exercised considerable influence within the new armed forces.

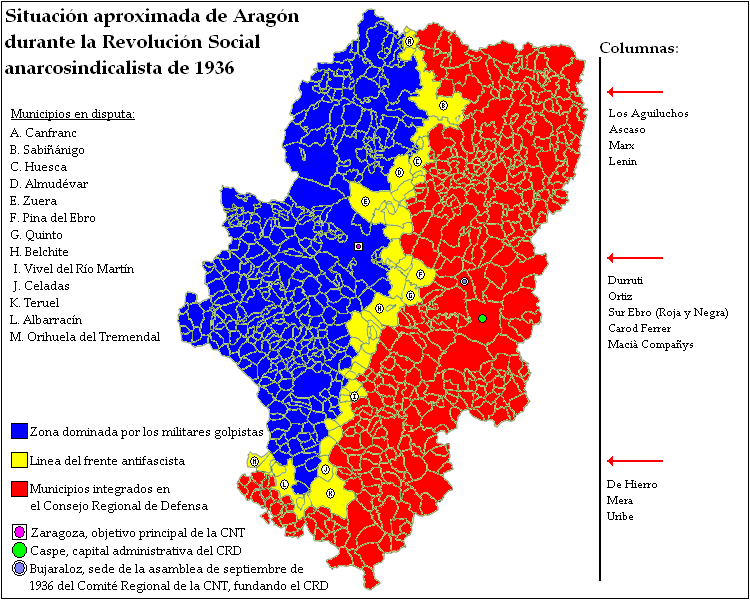
Map of the Aragon front

The CNT, POUM and other socialist militias initially resisted the integration. The CNT saw the militias as representing the will of the people while a centralized army was against its anti-authoritarian principles. They also feared the army as an organ of the Communist party, and these fears were backed up by the historical suppression of Russian anarchists by the Bolsheviks during the Russian Revolution. However, the CNT were eventually forced to yield to militarization, since the government refused to supply and arm its militias unless they joined the regular army. The experiences of CNT leaders in the front with the badly organized militias and the examples of better structured units such as the International Brigades also made them change their minds and support the creation of a regular army. The CNT conducted its own militarization. Helmut Ruediger of the International Workers' Association (AIT) reported in May 1937: "There is now in the central zone a CNT army of thirty-three thousand men perfectly armed, well-organized, and with membership cards of the CNT from the first to the last man, under the control of officers also belonging to the CNT." Militarization was still resisted by the most radical Anarchists within the CNT-FAI who were extremely passionate about their libertarian ideals. More than any other unit, the famous and notorious Iron Column fiercely resisted militarization. Composed of anarchists from Valencia and freed convicts, the Iron Column was critical of the CNT-FAI for joining the national government and defended the militia system in their periodical Linea de Fuego. The CNT refused to supply them with arms and in March 1937 they were incorporated into the regular army.

After the fall of the government of Francisco Largo Caballero and the rise of the Communist party to dominance in the armed forces, the integration of the militias was accelerated and most units were coerced into joining the regular army.

=== May events ===
During the Civil War, the Spanish Communist Party gained considerable influence due to the Republican force's reliance on weapons, supplies and military advisers from the Soviet Union. Furthermore, the Communist party (now working as the dominant force within the PSUC) constantly proclaimed that it was promoting "bourgeois democracy" and was fighting in defense of the Republic, not for proletarian revolution. Opposition to collectivization and the camouflaging of the true nature of the Spanish revolution by the Communist party was mainly due to the fear that the establishment of a revolutionary socialist state would antagonize Western democracies. The PSUC had also become the major defender of the Catalan middle classes against collectivization, organizing 18,000 tradesmen and artisans into the Catalan Federation of Small Businessmen and Manufacturers (GEPCI).

The party's attacks on the revolution, particularly the replacement of revolutionary committees with regular organs of state power brought it into conflict with the CNT-FAI, a major supporter of the revolutionary committees and the most powerful working class organization in Catalonia. The revolutionary Boletín de Información declared that: "The thousands of proletarian combatants at the battle fronts are not fighting for the 'democratic Republic.' They are proletarian revolutionaries, who have taken up arms in order to make the Revolution. To postpone the triumph of the latter until after we win the war would weaken considerably the fighting spirit of the working class.... The Revolution and the war are inseparable. Everything that is said to the contrary is reformist counterrevolution." In spite of this, CNT ministers in the government also acquiesced to decrees which dissolved revolutionary committees, largely because they believed this would lead to closer ties with Britain and France.

In the Catalan Generalitat, power was divided between the CNT, PSUC and Republican Left of Catalonia (ERC). Another influential party in Barcelona was the POUM (Workers' Party of Marxist Unification) which espoused an anti-Stalinist far left ideology, and was thus denounced by the PSUC as Trotskyist and Fascist. In turn, the POUM newspaper La Batalla accused the PSUC of being counterrevolutionary. In December 1936 the CNT and PSUC agreed to remove the POUM from the Catalan government. This was possibly influenced by Soviet consul Vladimir A. Antonov-Ovseenko who threatened to withdraw arm shipments. The PSUC now sought to weaken the CNT committees through an alliance with the urban middle classes and the rural tenant farmers in the Unió de Rabassaires. They passed a decree banning the committees, but could not effectively enforce it. This was because police power in Barcelona was divided between the CNT controlled patrols under the Junta de seguridad and the Assault and National Republican guards, under police commissioner Rodríguez Salas, a PSUC member. The PSUC and ERC then passed a set of decrees to dissolve the patrols and create a single unified security corps. CNT representatives in the Generalitat did not object, but there was widespread discontent among Anarchists and the POUM. Further decrees by the Generalitat which called up conscripts, dissolved military committees and provided for the integration of the militias into a regular army caused a crisis in which CNT ministers walked out of the government in protest. The POUM also opposed the decrees. Tensions were only exacerbated following the well publicized murders of PSUC secretary Roldán Cortada and Anarchist committee president Antonio Martín. Armed raids and attempts by the Republican guards to disarm the Anarchists and the seizure of towns along the French border from revolutionary committees led the CNT to mobilize and arm its workers.

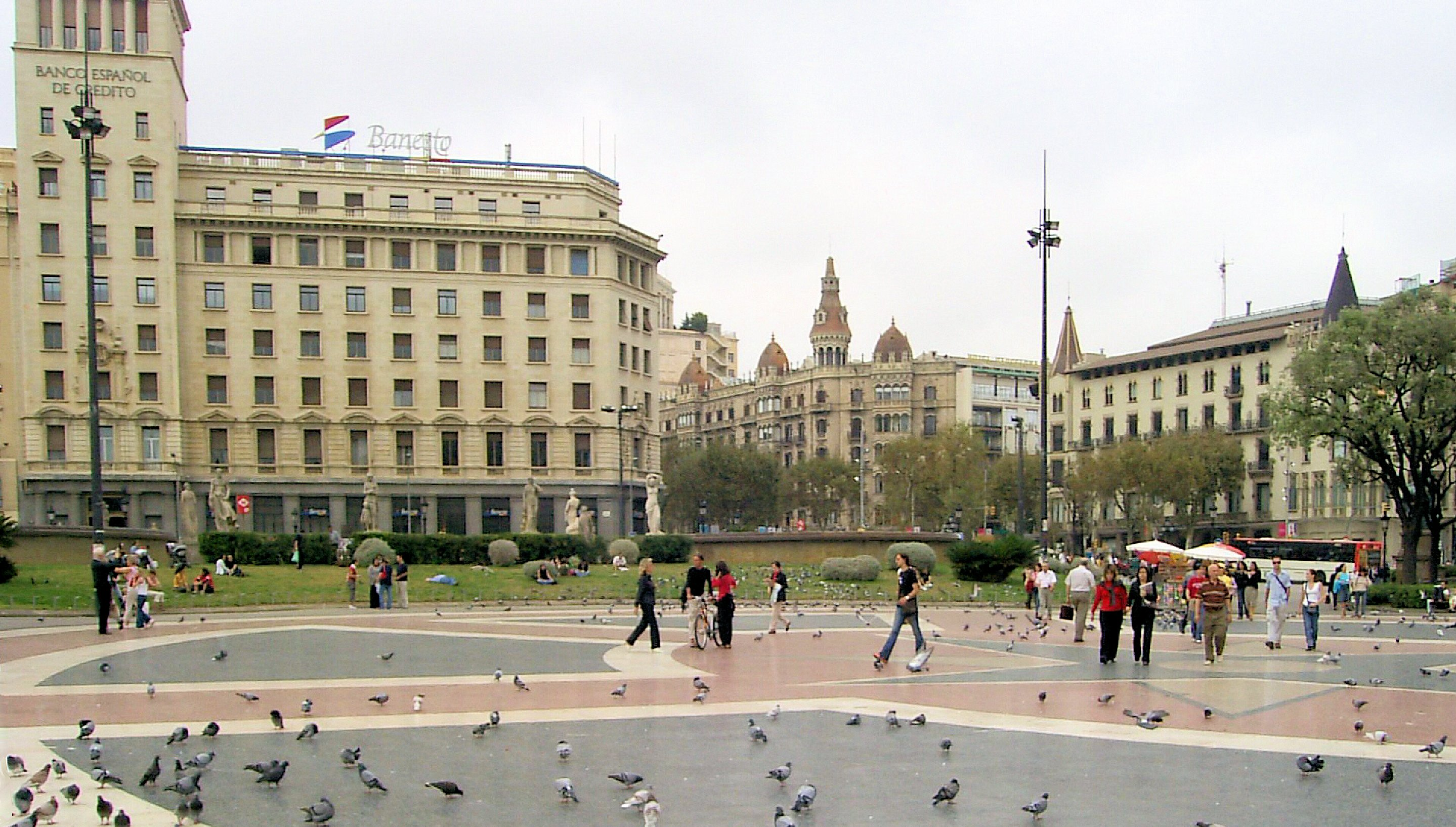
Plaça de Catalunya (Catalonia square)

In what became known as the Barcelona May Days of 1937, fighting broke out after civil guards attempted to take over a CNT-run telephone building in Barcelona's Plaça de Catalunya. The Civil guards took the ground floor of the telephone building, but were prevented from taking the upper levels. Soon, trucks carrying armed anarchists arrived. CNT councilors demanded the removal of police commissioner Rodríguez Salas, but Lluís Companys refused. The POUM stood by the CNT and advised them to take control of the city, but the CNT appealed to the workers to cease fighting. With the situation deteriorating, a meeting of CNT delegates from Valencia and the Generalitat under Companys agreed on a ceasefire and a new provisional government, but despite this, the fighting continued. Dissenting anarchists such as the "Friends of Durruti" and radical members of the POUM along with Bolshevik Leninists spread propaganda to continue to the fighting. On Wednesday, 5 May, prime minister Largo Caballero, under constant pressure from the PSUC to take control of public order in Catalonia, appointed Colonel Antonio Escobar of the Republican Guard as delegate of public order, but on his arrival in Barcelona, Escobar was shot and seriously wounded. After constant appeals by the CNT, POUM and UGT for a ceasefire, the fighting abated on the morning of 6 May. In the evening, news reached Barcelona that 1,500 assault guards were approaching the city. The CNT agreed on a truce after negotiations with the minister of interior back in Valencia. They agreed that the assault guards would not be attacked as long as they refrained from violence and that the CNT would order its members to abandon the barricades and go back to work. On 7 May, the assault guards entered Barcelona unopposed, and soon there were twelve thousand government troops in the city.

=== Repression of the CNT and POUM ===
In the days following the fighting in Barcelona, various Communist newspapers engaged in a massive propaganda campaign against the anarchists and the POUM. Pravda and the American communist Daily Worker claimed that Trotskyists and Fascists were behind the uprising. The Spanish Communist party newspapers also viciously attacked the POUM, denouncing members as traitors and fascists. The Communists, supported by the centrist faction of the Spanish Socialist Workers' Party (PSOE) under Indalecio Prieto now called for the POUM to be dissolved, but PM Largo Caballero resisted this move, and the Communists, along with their allies in the PSOE, then left the government in protest. The following crisis led to the removal of Largo Caballero by President Manuel Azaña. Azaña then appointed Juan Negrín (a centrist socialist and ally of the Communists and the Kremlin) as the new premier. The new cabinet was dominated by the Communists, center socialists and republicans, the CNT and left wing of the PSOE were not represented. The Communist Party of Spain (PCE) had now come to the fore as the most influential force in the Republican government.

In Catalonia, now controlled by troops under the Command of Communist General Sebastián Pozas and newly appointed Barcelona chief of Police Ricardo Burillo, the CNT independent police patrols were dissolved and disarmed. Furthermore, the CNT were completely removed from their positions at the Franco-Spanish border posts. Another major blow to the CNT was the dissolution of countless revolutionary committees throughout Catalonia by the army and assault guards. When a new cabinet was formed by President Companys, the CNT decided not to participate. In the months that followed, the Communists carried out a campaign of arrests, tortures and assassinations against the CNT. The imprisonment of many Anarchists caused a wave of dissent in working class quarters. Meanwhile, the Communists working with Soviet agents seized most of the POUM leadership along with many of its members. The POUM secretary Andrés Nin was also arrested, sent to a secret prison in Alcalá de Henares and eventually murdered. Nin's disappearance, and the repression of the POUM, caused an international outcry from various left wing organizations and further deepened the divisions within the Republic.

By the end of May 1937, the Communists were conducting a campaign to destroy the rural collectives. The PCE used the Popular army and the National Guard to dissolve CNT committees and aid tenant farmers and sharecroppers recover land lost in the revolution. On 11 August, the Eleventh popular army division dissolved the CNT dominated Regional Defense Council of Aragon by force. With the aid of the army and the assault guards, the tenant farmers and small owners who had lost their land in the beginning of the revolution now divided up the land confiscated from the collectives. Even those collectives that had been created voluntarily were raided. This caused widespread discontent amongst the peasants, the situation became so dire that the Communist party agrarian commission admitted that "agricultural work was paralyzed" and was forced to restore some of the collectives.

=== Divisions in the government and anarchist movement ===
In spite of the continued attacks by the PCE, the CNT eventually agreed to sign a pact of cooperation with the now Communist dominated UGT (the PCE had infiltrated the UGT and ousted Largo Caballero from his position in its executive). The pact was supposed to guarantee the legality of the remaining collectives and of worker's control, while at the same time recognizing the authority of the state on matters such as nationalization of industry and the armed forces. In reality, the collectives were never granted legal status, while the agreement served the further divide the anarchist movement between the anti-statist and collaborationist camps.

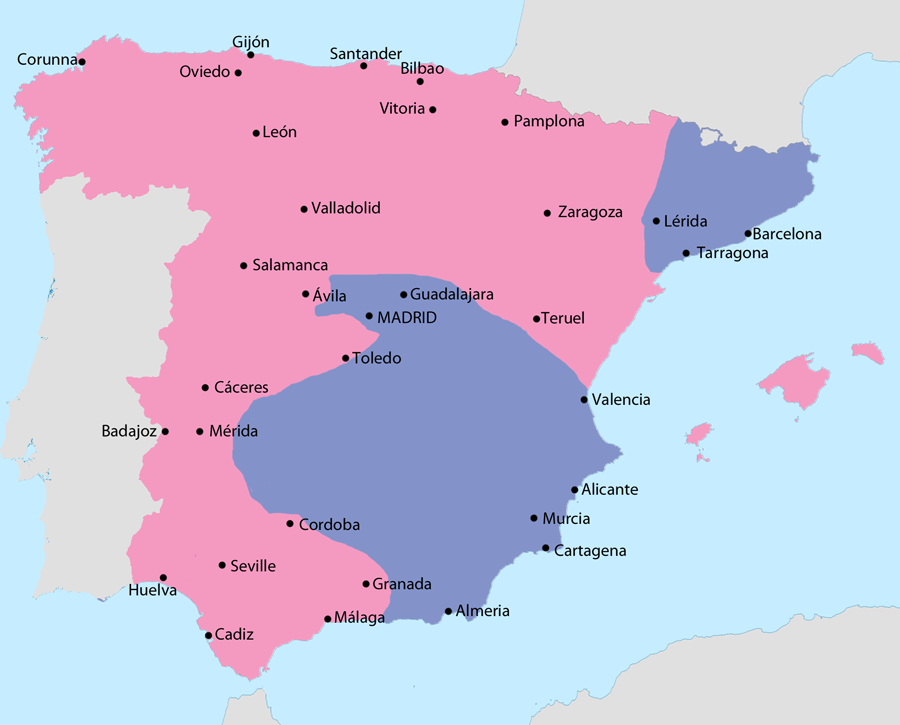
Spain in July 1938

On 7 March 1938, the Nationalist forces launched a massive offensive in Aragon. They succeeded in smashing the Republican defenses so thoroughly that their forces had reached the Mediterranean coast by 15 April, splitting the Republican territory in two. Catalonia was now cut off from the rest of the Republican territory.

By 1938, the Communist party was also in control of the newly created Military Investigation Service. The SIM was virtually dominated by Communist party members, allies and Soviet agents such as Aleksandr Mikhailovich Orlov and used as a tool of political repression. According to Basque nationalist Manuel de Irujo, "hundreds and thousands of citizens" were prosecuted by SIM tribunals and tortured in the SIM's secret prisons. Repression by the SIM as well as decrees which eroded Catalan autonomy by nationalizing the Catalan war industry, ports and courts caused widespread discontent in Catalonia amongst all social classes. Relations worsened between the Generalitat and the central government of Negrín, now based in Barcelona with the resignation of Jaime Aiguadé, representative of the Republican Left of Catalonia (ERC) party in the government and Manuel de Irujo, the Basque Nationalist minister. There was now widespread hostility amongst Republicans, Catalans, Basques and Socialists towards the Negrin government. As the Communists were forced to rely more and more on their dominance of the military and police, morale declined at the front as countless dissenting anarchists, republicans and socialists were arrested or shot by commissars and SIM agents.

Meanwhile, there was now a growing schism within the CNT and the FAI. Leading figures such as Horacio Prieto and minister of education Segundo Blanco argued for collaboration with the national government. Dissenting anarchists such as Jacinto Toryho, the director of Solidaridad Obrera and FAI delegate Pedro Herrera were harshly critical of this policy. Toryho was removed from his position by the CNT national committee on 7 May 1938. Two months before the fall of Catalonia, a national plenum of the libertarian socialists was held in Barcelona between 16 and 30 October 1938. Emma Goldman was in attendance and she defended the FAI in "opposition to the growing encroachment of the Negrín government on the libertarian achievements". According to José Peirats, Horacio Prieto argued for an "undisguised reformism bordering on Marxism," and that "truly effective action" was only possible through "organs of power." He also criticized the naivete of the anarchists and its "lack of concrete plans."

=== Fall of Catalonia ===
Between July and November 1938 the Republican forces launched their largest offensive yet which was designed to reconnect their divided territory with Catalonia. Lacking in air support, armor and heavy artillery, the Popular army was soundly defeated in the disastrous Battle of the Ebro. According to Beevor, losses were as high as 30,000 on the Republican side. The Popular army was practically destroyed. It was the last action of the International Brigades and the Republican air force. On 23 December, Nationalist forces launched their assault on Catalonia. By now, most Catalans were demoralized and tired of the fighting. Alienated by the Negrin government and the Communist party's nationalization of industry, the CNT was filled with defeatism and internal division. Pi Sunyer, mayor of Barcelona and a leader of the ERC, told President Azaña that "the Catalans no longer knew why they were fighting, because of Negrín's anti-Catalan policy." Catalonia was swiftly conquered by Nationalist troops. After 4 days of aerial bombardment (between 21 and 25 January), Barcelona fell on 26 January. Afterwards there followed five days of looting and extrajudicial killings by the Nationalist troops. Between 400,000 and 500,000 refugees including the defeated Army of Catalonia crossed the border into France. With the Nationalists now in control, Catalan autonomy was abolished, removing the co-official status of the Catalan language and banning Catalan Christian names, and the Sardana was forbidden. All the Catalan newspapers were requisitioned and the forbidden books retired and burned.

== Criticism ==
Austrian author Franz Borkenau was sharply critical of the anarchists in Catalonia. In a book which was also very critical of the Soviet Union-backed Communists, he described the terror which they had inflicted on Barcelona residents and their environment.

=== Crimes ===
During the first weeks of the war, courts of law were replaced by revolutionary tribunals and extrajudicial killings by militants and vigilantes soon followed:

Everybody created his own justice and administered it himself...Some used to call this 'taking a person for a ride' [paseo] but I maintain that it was justice administered directly by the people in the complete absence of the regular judicial bodies.

— Juan García Oliver, Anarchist minister of justice, 1936

During the initial fighting several thousand individuals were executed by anarchist and socialist militants based on their assumed political allegiance and social class:

We do not wish to deny that the nineteenth of July brought with it an overflowing of passions and abuses, a natural phenomenon of the transfer of power from the hands of privileged to the hands of the people. It is possible that our victory resulted in the death by violence of four or five thousand inhabitants of Catalonia who were listed as rightists and were linked to political or ecclesiastical reaction.

— Diego Abad de Santillán, editor of Solidaridad Obrera

Because of its role as a leading supporter of the Nationalist cause, the Catholic Church came under attack throughout the region. Church buildings were burned or taken over by the CNT or by supporters of the Republican government and turned into warehouses or put to other secular uses. Thousands of members of the Catholic clergy were tortured and killed and many more fled the country or sought refuge in foreign embassies.

Antony Beevor estimates the total number of people killed in Catalonia in the summer and autumn of 1936 at 8,352 (out of a total of 38,000 victims of the Red Terror in all of Spain).

== Film ==
- Land and Freedom, based loosely on Homage to Catalonia
- Libertarias, a Spanish film directed by Vicente Aranda about the Mujeres Libres, an anarcha-feminist group closely affiliated with the CNT-FAI
- Vivir la Utopia, a documentary film by Juan Gamero, Spanish with English subtitles, lasting 94 min

== See also ==
- Commonwealth of Catalonia (6 April 1914 – 20 March 1925)
- Catalan Republic within the Iberian Federation (14 April 1931 – 17 April 1931)
- Galician Republic (27 June 1931 – 28 June 1931)
- Asturian Socialist Republic (4 October 1934 – 19 October 1934)
- Catalan State within the Spanish Federal Republic (6 October 1934 – 7 October 1934)
- Popular Executive Committee of Valencia (22 July 1936 – 8 January 1937)
- Málaga Public Health Committee (22 July 1936 – 8 February 1937)
- Anarchist Aragon (31 July 1936 – 1 April 1939)
- Sovereign Council of Asturias and León (6 September 1936 – 21 October 1937)
- Regional Defence Council of Aragon (6 October 1936 – 11 August 1937)
- Government of Euzkadi (7 October 1936 – 26 January 1939) (in exile from 26 January 1939 – 9 June 1979)
- Madrid Defense Council (7 November 1936 – 23 April 1937)
- Interprovincial Council of Santander, Palencia and Burgos (8 February 1937 – 26 August 1937)
- Generalitat de Catalunya (in exile from 5 November 1939 – 5 December 1977)
- Basque Republic (18 January 1941 – 23 May 1942)
- Catalan Republic (10 October 2017; 27 October 2017 – 30 October 2017) (in exile from 30 October 2017 – 8 November 2017)
- Council for the Republic (30 October 2018 – present)

== Bibliography ==
- Ackelsberg, Martha (2005). Free Women of Spain: Anarchism and the Struggle for the Emancipation of Women. Oakland: AK Press. ISBN 1-902593-96-0. OCLC 492943653.
- Alexander, Robert (1999). The Anarchists in the Spanish Civil War. London: Janus. ISBN 1-85756-400-6. OCLC 43717219.
- Bolloten, Burnett (1991). The Spanish Civil War: revolution and counterrevolution. University of North Carolina Press. ISBN 978-0-8078-1906-7.
- Beevor, Antony (2006) [1982]. The Battle for Spain: The Spanish Civil War 1936–1939. London: Weidenfeld & Nicolson. ISBN 0-297-84832-1.
- Bookchin, Murray (1978). The Spanish Anarchists: The Heroic Years, 1868–1936. New York: Harper & Row. ISBN 0-06-090607-3. OCLC 4604735.
- Graham, Helen (2002). The Spanish Republic at War, 1936–1939. Cambridge: Cambridge University Press. ISBN 0-521-45932-X. OCLC 464890766.
- Paz, Abel (2006) [1996]. Durruti in the Spanish Revolution. Translated by Morse, Chuck. Edinburgh: AK Press. ISBN 1-904859-50-X. LCCN 2006920974. OCLC 482919277.
- Peirats, Jose (1998). Anarchists in the Spanish Revolution. London: Freedom Press. ISBN 0-900384-53-0.
- Preston, Paul, ed. (2001) [1984]. Revolution and War in Spain 1931–1939. London: Routledge. ISBN 0-415-09894-7. OCLC 803661954.
- Ruiz, Julius (2014). The 'Red Terror' and the Spanish Civil War. Cambridge: Cambridge University Press. ISBN 9781107054547.
- Orwell, George (2012). Homage to Catalonia. HarperCollins Canada. ISBN 978-1-4434-1676-4.
- Seidman, Michael (April 2000). "Agrarian Collectives during the Spanish Revolution and Civil War". European History Quarterly. 30 (2). London: Sage Publishing: 209–235. doi:10.1177/026569140003000203. ISSN 0265-6914. LCCN 84643695. OCLC 5723592885. S2CID 144459611.
- Seidman, Michael (2002). Republic of Egos: A Social History of the Spanish Civil War. University of Wisconsin Press. ISBN 0299178641.
- Seidman, Michael (2011). The Victorious Counterrevolution: The Nationalist Effort in the Spanish Civil War. University of Wisconsin Press. ISBN 978-0299249649.
- Thomas, Hugh (2001) [1961]. The Spanish Civil War. New York: Modern Library. ISBN 0-375-75515-2.
