= Lasa =

Lasa or LASA may refer to:

== Places ==
- Lassa, Lebanon, a village in the Byblos District
- Lasa, Paphos, a village in Paphos District, Cyprus
- Lasa, the Italian name for Laas, a municipality in South Tyrol, Italy
- Lhasa, the capital of Tibet Autonomous Region of People's Republic of China

== Other uses ==
- Laboratory Animal Science Association, a member of the Federation of European Laboratory Animal Science Associations
- Lares or Lasas, gods and goddesses in Etruscan mythology
- Latin American Studies Association
- Liberal Arts and Science Academy in Austin, Texas, a magnet high school

== People with the name ==
- Bernardo Estornés Lasa (1907–1999), writer and promoter of Basque culture
- Mikel Lasa (born 1971), Spanish football player
- Óscar Lasa or Lasa III (born 1972), Spanish player of Basque pelota
- Tassilo von Heydebrand und der Lasa, German chess master
- Ernst von Heydebrand und der Lasa (1851–1924), German politician and landowner

== See also ==
- Lhasa (disambiguation)
- Lahsa (disambiguation)
- Lassa (disambiguation)
