= Lassus (disambiguation) =

Orlande de Lassus (Orlando di Lasso, c. 1532 – 1594) was a Franco-Flemish composer of the Renaissance.

Lassus may also refer to:

== People ==
- Kristiina Lassus (born 1966), a Finnish product designer and interior architect
- Jean-Baptiste Lassus (1807–1857), a French architect
- Oriane Lassus (born 1987), French author, cartoonist, illustrator
- Pierre Lassus (1741–1807), a French surgeon

== Other ==
- Amblyseius lassus
- De Lassus, Missouri
- Lassus Mountains
- Tramont-Lassus

== See also ==
- Lassas
