= Idoia Estornés Zubizarreta =

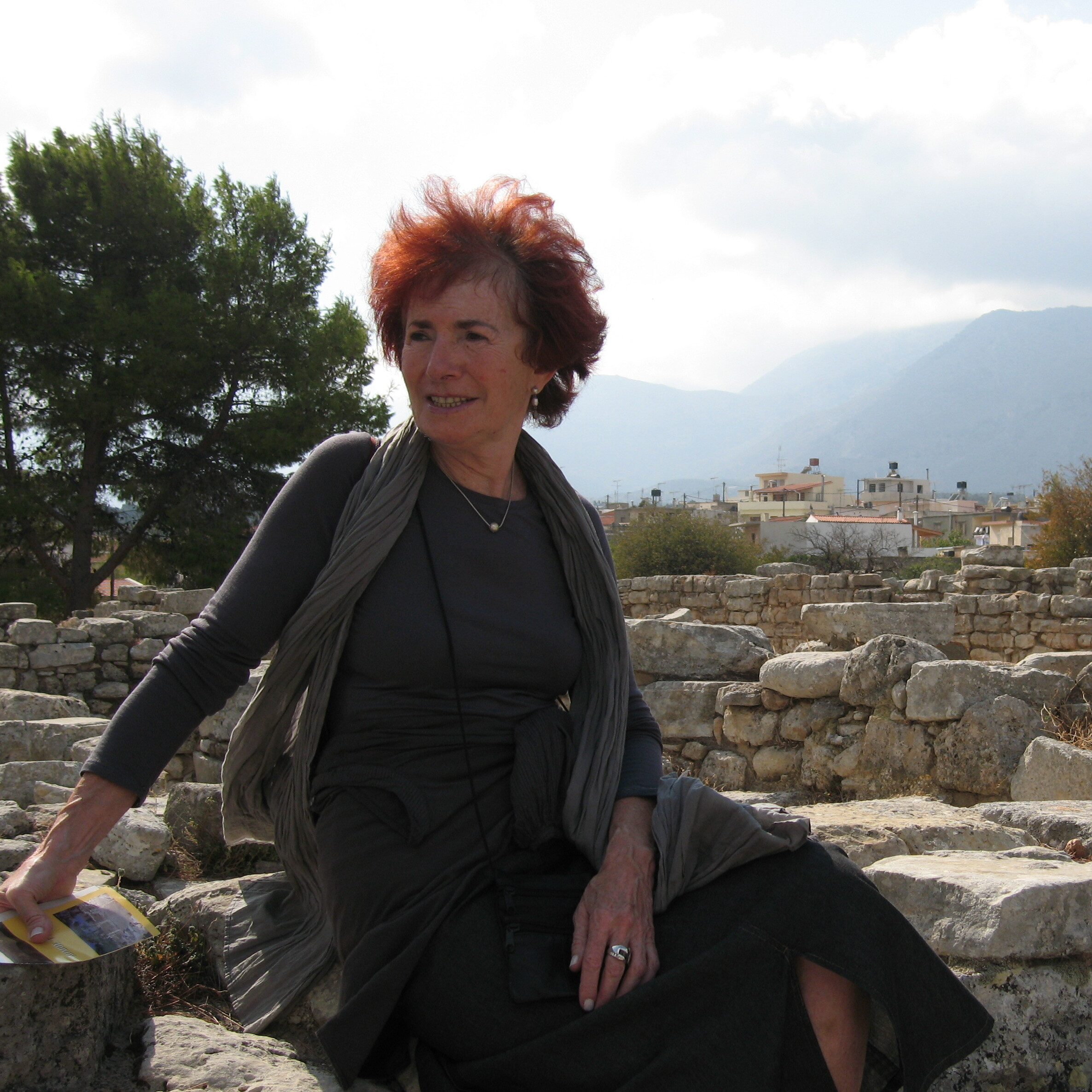
- Idoia Estornes (2008)
- Born: 28 November 1940 (age 85); Santiago, Chile
- Citizenship: Spanish
- Education: University of Navarra
- Occupations: historian; writer
- Relatives: Bernardo Estornés Lasa & Ignacia Zubizarreta (parents)
- Writing career
- Notable work: Cómo pudo pasarnos esto. Crónica de una chica de los 60.
- Notable awards: Premio Literario de Ensayo Euskadi; Premios Euskadi de Literatura

Idoia Estornés Zubizarreta (Santiago de Chile, 28 November 1940) is a Chilean-born Spanish historian and writer. She was honored with the "Premio Literario de Ensayo Euskadi" in 1988 and the Premios Euskadi de Literatura in 2014.

== Early life and education ==
Idoia Estornés Zubizarreta was born in Santiago de Chile in 1940, into a Basque nationalist family exiled due to the Civil War. Her parents are Bernardo Estornés Lasa and Ignacia Zubizarreta. In 1958, she settled in San Sebastián, where, in 1961, she began her degree in Philosophy and Letters. Between 1962 and 1966, she completed her studies at the University of Navarra, where she later obtained a doctorate in history in 1988.

== Career ==
In 1976, she published her first work, Carlismo y abolición foral. 1876–1976 (Carlism and the abolition of the charters. 1876–1976) (Auñamendi Encyclopedia, San Sebastián, 1976). Subsequently, she has been the editorial director of the Basque Encyclopaedic Dictionary by Auñamendi and a contributor to various Spanish and French press. Between 2000 and 2006, she also directed the update of the Illustrated General Encyclopaedia of the Basque Country, devoting herself exclusively to it.

In 2013, she published her work, Cómo pudo pasarnos esto. Crónica de una chica de los 60. (How could this have happened to us. Chronicle of a girl from the 60s.) (Erein, San Sebastián, 2013, pp. 572), which was a finalist for the 2014 National Essay Award and received the 2014 Euskadi Literature Award, in the category of literature in Spanish.

== Awards and honours ==
- Premio Literario de Ensayo Euskadi, 1988.
- Premios Euskadi de Literatura, 2014, in the category of literature in Spanish, and finalist of the 2014 Premio Nacional de Ensayo (National Essay Award), for her work, Cómo pudo pasarnos esto. Crónica de una chica de los 60.

== Selected works ==
- Carlismo y abolición foral. 1876–1976. (Auñamendi, San Sebastián, 1976) ISBN 8470251864
- Qué son los partidos abertzales (San Sebastián, 1977) ISBN 9788470251306
- La Sociedad de Estudios Vascos 1918–1936. Aportación de Eusko-Ikaskuntza a la cultura vasca. (Eusko Ikaskuntza, San Sebastián, 1983) ISBN 848624000X
- La construcción de una nacionalidad vasca. El autonomismo de Eusko-Ikaskuntza (1918–1931) (tesis doctoral), (Eusko Ikaskuntza, San Sebastián, 1990) ISBN 84-87471-04-8
- Cómo pudo pasarnos esto. Crónica de una chica de los 60. (Erein, San Sebastián, 2013) ISBN 9788497468305
- Cuando Marx visitó Loyola. Un sindicato vasco durante el periodo franquista. (Erein, San Sebastián, 2017) ISBN 8491091505
