= Bernardo Estornés Lasa =

Spanish writer

- Bernardo Estornés Lasa
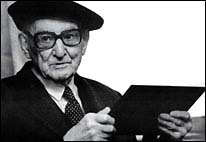
- Born: 1907; Isaba, Navarra, Spain
- Died: 1999 (aged 91–92); San Sebastián
- Occupation: Writer,
- Relatives: Idoia Estornés Zubizarreta (daughter)
- Writing career
- Language: Basque, Spanish

Bernardo Estornés Lasa (1907–1999) was a Spanish lyrical poet and writer in the Basque language.

He founded and directed the General Illustrated Encyclopedia of the Basque Country (autonomous community), popularly known as the Auñamendi Encyclopedia, whose contents have been uploaded to the digital encyclopedia of the Basque Country Auñamendi Eusko Entziklopedia.

== Biography ==
In 1922 he moved to Zaragoza to study. He learned Basque and began his historiographic studies in the Roncal Valley, writing his first book in 1927 "Erronkari" with great sales success. In that year he joined the Basque Studies Society (Eusko Ikaskuntza). He graduated in 1929 with the title of Commercial Professor. In December of that year, he was appointed Head of the Office of the Basque Studies Society. In September 1930, he participated in the decision to draw up the draft of the Statute of Autonomy of the Basque Country of 1979, Second Spanish Republic.

Between 1933 and 1934 he created the Beñat Idaztiak publisher and the Zabalkundea Collection. In 1938, with Spanish Civil War and the pre-war in Europe, he decided to leave for America. In 1946 he organized a glass recycling industry as a source of income for the family while he was in exile. He promotes the publishing house "Ekin" of Basque exiles in Argentina and publishes his "Estética vasca" (1952).

In 1958, he embarked for Europe and settled in San Sebastián. He began to publish the Auñamendi Collection, under the coverage of Itxaropena until 1962. His publications had to overcome Francoist Spain censorship based on the order of the Ministry of the Interior (Spain) of 15 July 1939.

In 1966, the Academy of the Basque Language (Euskaltzaindia) appointed Estornés as an academic, as does the American Institute of Basque Studies in Buenos Aires. In these years the General Illustrated Encyclopedia of the Basque Country (known as the Auñamendi Encyclopedia ), presented in three sections: «Basque Encyclopedic Dictionary», «Systematic Encyclopedia» and «General Basque Bibliography». In 1992 he was distinguished with the Manuel Lekuona award.

== Bibliography ==
- Sabin euskalduna. Beñat Idaztiak, Eusko Argitaldaria, 1931
- Cuentos roncaleses, poemas y otras cosas navarras, Auñamendi, 1980

=== Poetry ===
- Cantar de Roncesvalles y otros Poemas navarros, El, Auñamendi, 1979
- Kixmi-ren kantua – El Cantar de Kixmi, Auñamendi, 1982
