= Manuel de Irujo =

Spanish Basque politician

Manuel de Irujo Ollo

Minister of Justice
- In office 17 May 1937 – 10 December 1937
- Preceded by: Juan García Oliver
- Succeeded by: Mariano Ansó Zunzarren

Personal details
- Born: 25 September 1891 Estella, Spain
- Died: 1 January 1981 (aged 89) Bilbao, Spain
- Occupation: Lawyer

Manuel de Irujo Ollo (25 September 1891 – 1 January 1981) was a lawyer and politician from Navarre, Spain, who became the leader of the Basque Nationalist Party during the Second Spanish Republic. He was a liberal democrat with a profound faith in Christianity. He was Minister of Justice in 1937 during the Spanish Civil War (1936–1939). He went into exile after the Republican defeat. He returned from exile in 1977 and was elected to the Senate.

== Life ==
=== Early years (1891–1918) ===
Manuel de Irujo Ollo was born in Estella, Navarre, on 25 September 1891. He was the son of the lawyer Daniel Irujo y Urra, professor in the University of Deusto and a Navarre nationalist. His ancestors had lived in Navarre since the 16th century. His paternal grandfather was Carlist mayor of Tafalla at the start of the first Carlist War, and left that liberal-dominated town to settle in Estella. There his father married the daughter of a liberal family. His maternal grandmother was born in the Philippines, daughter of the president of the Audencia of Manila, the high court of the territory.

Manuel de Irujo was brought up to accept liberal, Catholic, Christian-democratic principles. (Note: Later Irujo would argue that the Catholic Church had tried to undermine the Republican regime from its inception, in contrast to those who argued that the Republic had systematically persecuted the church.) He attended the Jesuit college at Orduña, studied Philosophy and Law at the University of Deusto and obtained a doctorate at the University of Salamanca. He joined the Basque Nationalist Party (Partido Nacionalista Vasco, PNV) in 1908. He returned to Estella when his father died, and acted as father to his younger brothers for several years. He founded the Estella Basque Center, and began to practice law in that city. He married, but was widowed in 1918.

=== Provincial politician (1919–1932) ===
Irujo was elected provincial deputy for Navarre in 1919, but this was annulled. He was a provincial deputy from 1921 to 1923. He proposed a reform to allow land acquisition by tenants, but this failed to be enacted due to opposition by landlords. The Navarre Savings Bank (Caja de Ahorros de Navarra) was founded on his initiative. He was reelected provincial deputy in 1923, but lost his seat that year with the dictatorship of Miguel Primo de Rivera, and was imprisoned for a period. After the resignation of Primo de Rivera in 1930 Manuel de Irujo rejoined the Navarre provincial government for almost a year. He was a member of the Society of Basque Studies, and in 1932 was appointed to the permanent council of the society.

=== National deputy (1933–1939) ===
Irujo was elected deputy for Gipuzkoa in the national elections of 19 November 1933. In 1934 he defended the Basque municipalities before the Supreme Court for their actions during the rebellion that year. He had personally been involved in the rebellion. In January 1936 he and other PNV leaders were invited to Rome by the Vatican Secretariat of State, but did not reach an agreement. He was reelected to parliament the next month.

On hearing of the military revolt in July 1936 at the start of the Spanish Civil War (1936–1939) Irujo and the nationalist deputy Lasarte delivered a note to the civil governor in which, on behalf of their parliamentary group, they invited the armed forces and civilians to assist the legitimate legal powers against the military fascist movement. The note was broadcast on the radio, but the PNV leadership at first rejected it. As one of the leaders of the loyalist forces, Irujo played a leading role in the negotiations that led to the surrender of the garrison of Loiola in San Sebastián. He was one of the members of the council that directed the Basque Militias and was President of the Basque Defense Council for the central part of the province. He proposed immediate formation of a Basque government, which was accepted by the Gipuzkoa Defense Council but not by the Biscay Defense Council, which argued that the Basque Statute must be approved to form the government. The PNV quickly assumed control of the Basque Country, but found themselves fighting both against the rebels and against members of the radical left, whom Irujo called "extremist elements brought into the house".

On 5 September 1936 the PNV leader, José Antonio Aguirre, was offered the Ministry of Public Works in the new Republican government headed by Francisco Largo Caballero. This was followed by negotiations over what the government would offer the Basques in exchange for their participation. The PNV demanded immediate approval of the Basque Statute as a condition, and when this was agreed Irujo took office as Minister Without Portfolio on 26 September 1936. The Basque Statute was approved by parliament on 1 October 1936. Irujo was Minister without Portfolio until 17 May 1937.

On 17 May 1937 Irujo was appointed Minister of Justice in the government of Juan Negrín. Negrín supported Irujo in his efforts to normalize the judicial process and courts. Irujo accepted the post on condition that the freedom of conscience was respected, as guaranteed by the constitution, that public worship was restored and that steps be taken to free imprisoned priests and members of religious orders. This stance became hard to maintain when the episcopate's Collective Letter was circulated in August 1937, since it supported General Francisco Franco and apparently incited people to rebel against the Republic. Irugo, who had deep Christian beliefs, wrote in a letter to a friend, "I am well aware that there have been martyrs in both zones; I am aware too that the Church, whatever else it may be, will become a martyr in the Republican zone and join the firing-squads in the Francoist zone."

In June 1937 Irujo offered to resign by order of the Basque government due to the undefended position in which the Republican government had left the Basque Country. Irujo definitely resigned as Minister of Justice in December 1937 over the implementation of the emergency courts. He was replaced by Mariano Ansó Zunzarren on 10 December 1937. He was again Minister without Portfolio from 10 December 1937 to 16 August 1938. He agreed to accept this position at the request of Aguirre, who thought the PNV should continue to participate in the cabinet. Irujo resigned from the government on 16 August 1938 due to his opposition as a Christian to the death penalty.

=== Later career (1939–1981) ===
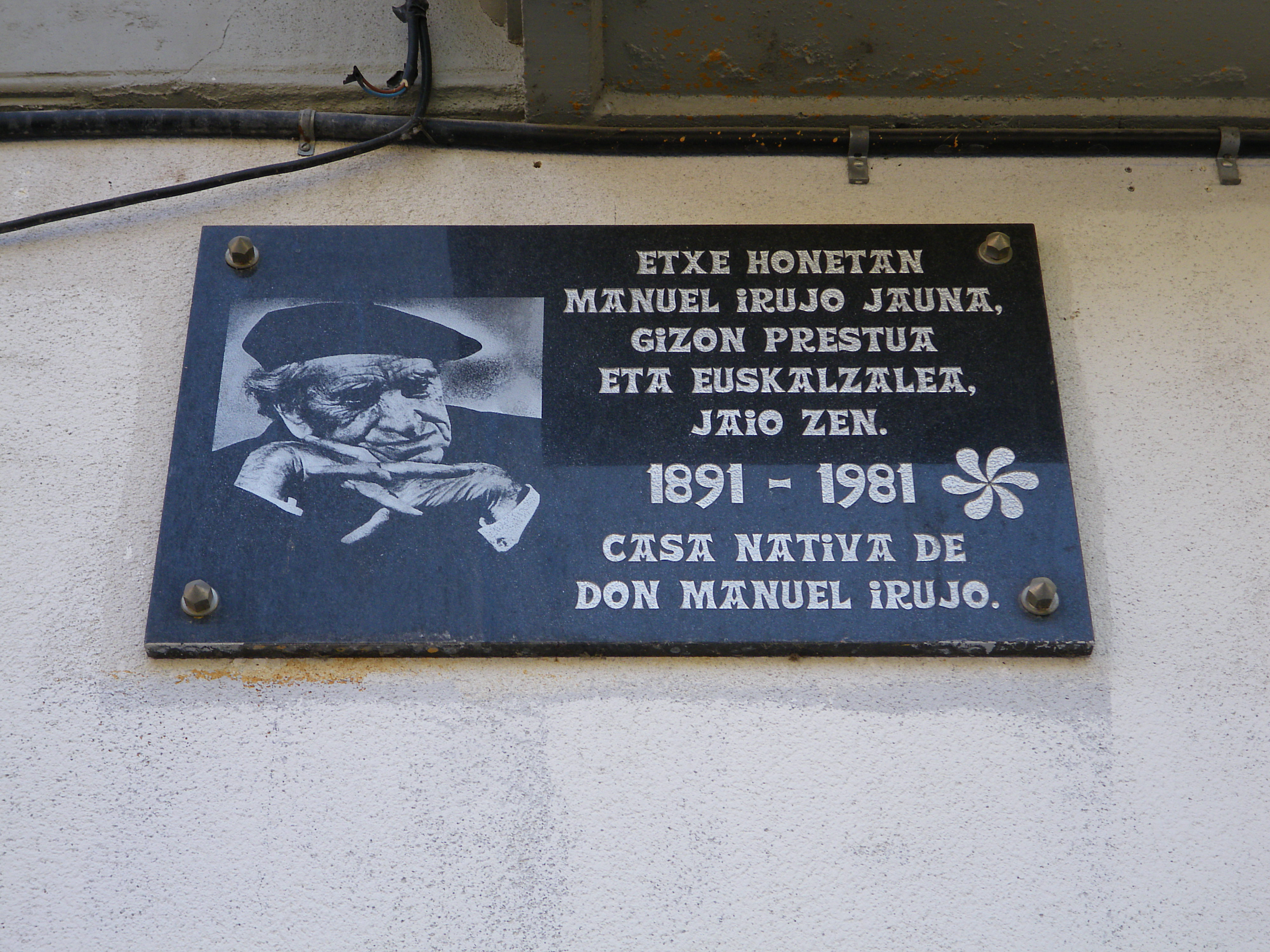
Plaque on the house in Estella where Manuel Irujo Ollo was born

Irujo went into exile after the defeat of the Republic in the spring of 1939. He became one of the leaders of the International League of Friends of the Basques. During World War II (1939–1945) he chaired the Basque National Council in London in 1941 in the absence of Aguirre, and signed an agreement with General Charles de Gaulle on the Europe of Tomorrow. He proposed a constitution for a Basque Republic as a buffer state between a future liberated France and a reduced or confederated Spain, supposing that the Allies would defeat Franco. In 1942 he was one of the founders of the Cultural Union of the Countries of Western Europe. He joined the Union of European Federalists. In 1944 he was a member of the committee for an Iberian Community of Nations, and in 1945 was one of the authors of the Comunidad Ibérica de Naciones, advocating an Iberian federation bringing together the Portuguese, Spanish, Catalan and Basque nations. In 1945 he was named Minister of Industry, Commerce and Navigation in the Republican government in exile, and from 1946 to 1947 was Minister of Justice in this government.

Irujo continued to be active in discussions over the federal constitution of Europe in the years that followed. At the congress of the European Federalist Movement in 1972 he was appointed honorary president of the Peninsula Federal Council of the European movement. On 25 March 1977 he returned from exile and was elected senator for Navarre. He was elected on the PNV platform to the provincial parliament of Navarre as representative for Pamplona in 1979. Manuel de Irujo Ollo died on 1 January 1981 at the age of 89.

== Publications ==
Publications by Manuel de Irujo include:

- Irujo, Manuel de (1937). A los vascos de América. (To the Basques of America) Speech by Manuel de Irujo in Valencia on 30 April 1937. Valencia. p. 8.
- Irujo, Manuel de (1945). Instituciones jurídicas vascas. (Basque Legal Institutions). Buenos Aires: Ekin. p. 144.
  - Irujo, Manuel de (2006). Instituciones jurídicas vascas. (Basque Legal Institutions) (2 ed.). Buenos Aires (Argentina): Ekin; Tafalla : Txalaparta. p. 124. ISBN 84-8136-467-3.
- Irujo, Manuel de (1945). Inglaterra y los vascos. (England and the Basques). Buenos Aires: Vasca Ekin. p. 444.
  - Irujo, Manuel de (2004). Inglaterra y los vascos. (England and the Basques) (2 ed.). Tafalla (Nafarroa) : Txalaparta; Buenos Aires: Ekin. p. 488. ISBN 84-8136-392-8.
- Irujo, Manuel de (1951). La Guerra Civil en Euzkadi antes del Estatuto. (The Civil War in the Basque country before the proclamation of the Basque Statute). Stanford University. p. 86.
  - Irujo, Manuel de (1978). La guerra civil en Euzkadi antes del estatuto. (The Civil War in the Basque country before the proclamation of the Basque Statute). Madrid?: E.D., D.L. p. 117. ISBN 84-85506-01-4.
  - Irujo, Manuel de; Josu Jon Imaz (prolog) (2006). La guerra civil en Euzkadi antes del estatuto. (The Civil War in the Basque country before the proclamation of the Basque Statute). Bilbao: Kirikiño. p. 267. ISBN 84-611-4545-3.

== Sources ==
- Amezaga Iribarren, Arantzazu (2011-06-14). "LA PARTIDA DE TENIS DE MANUEL IRUJO. 1939" (in Spanish).
- Dulphy, Anne (1999). "Peut-on parler d'une génération de Francais de la guerre civile?". Enfants de la guerre civile espagnole: vécus et représentations de la génération née entre 1925 et 1940 (in French). Harmattan. ISBN 978-2-7384-7352-3.
- Estornés Zubizarreta, Idoia (2015). "Manuel de Irujo Ollo". Auñamendi Eusko Entziklopedia (in Spanish). Fondo Bernardo Estornés Lasa.
- Graham, Helen (2002-12-19). The Spanish Republic at War 1936–1939. Cambridge University Press. p. 131. ISBN 978-0-521-45932-7.
- "Irujo, Manuel de (1891–1981)" (in Spanish). Biblioteca Nacional.
- Monferrer Catalán, Luis (2007). Odisea en Albión: los republicanos españoles exiliados en Gran Bretaña 1936–1977 (in Spanish). Ediciones de la Torre. ISBN 978-8479603861.
- Raguer, Hilari (2007-05-07). Gunpowder and Incense: The Catholic Church and the Spanish Civil War. Routledge. ISBN 978-1-134-36593-7.
- Urquijo y Goitia, José Ramón de (2008). Gobiernos y ministros españoles en la edad contemporánea (in Spanish). Editorial CSIC – CSIC Press. ISBN 978-84-00-08737-1.
- Vignaux, Paul (1986). Manuel de Irujo: ministre de la République dans la guerre d'Espagne, 1936–1939 (in French). Editions Beauchesne. ISBN 978-2-7010-1128-8.
