= Lassa =

Lassa may refer to:

== Biology and medicine ==
- Asthena lassa, a moth in the family Geometridae
- Lassa fever, a type of viral hemorrhagic fever caused by the Lassa virus
  - Lassa virus, the arenavirus that causes Lassa fever
- Lassa hastata (Pavonia hastata), a shrub in the family Malvaceae
- Saphenista lassa, a species of moth of the family Tortricidae

== Places ==
- Lassa, a town in Borno State, Nigeria
- Lassa, Lebanon, a municipality in the Byblos District of Mount Lebanon Governorate, Lebanon
- Lassa, Togo, a city in the Kara Region of Togo
- Lhasa or Lassa, the inner urban district of the city Lhasa, Tibet, China
  - Lhasa (city)

== Other uses ==
- Lassa Oppenheim (1858–1919), German jurist and author
- Lassa (surname), a surname (including a list of people with the name)
- FC Barcelona Lassa, a former sponsorship name of a Spanish professional basketball club

== See also ==
- Lasa (disambiguation)
- Lassas, a surname (including a list of people with the name)
- Lhasa (disambiguation)
