= Daniel Irujo Urra =

Spanish lawyer

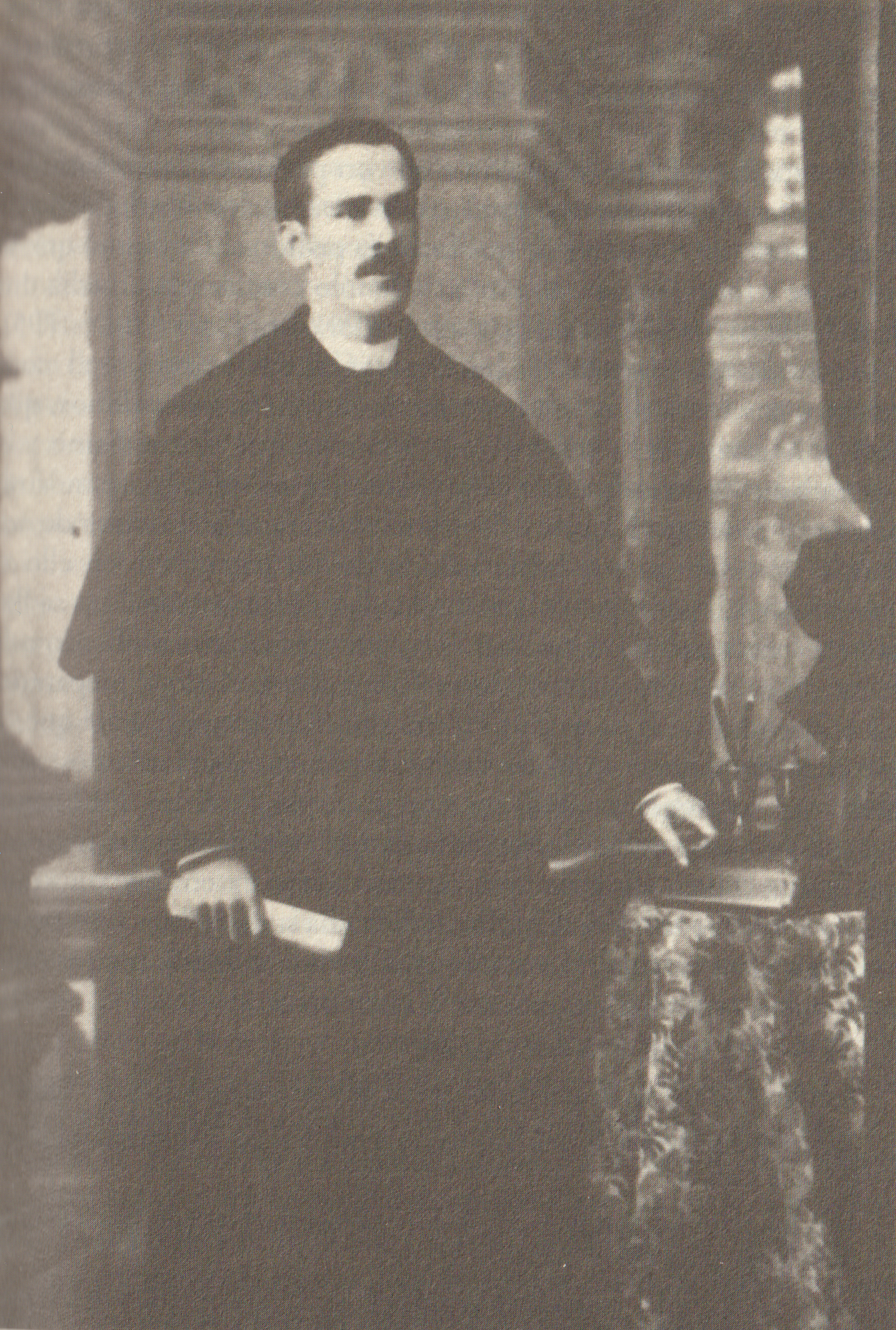
- Born: Daniel Irujo Urra; 1862; Estella, Spain
- Died: 1911 (aged 48–49); Estella, Spain
- Occupations: lawyer, scholar, local self-government official
- Political party: Carlism, Basque nationalism

Alejandro María Daniel Irujo Urra (1862–1911) was a Spanish lawyer. In popular discourse he is known as father of Manuel Irujo Ollo, a Basque political leader. In scholarly historiographic realm he is acknowledged mostly as defense attorney of Sabino Arana during his trials of 1896 and 1902. Politically Irujo is considered a typical case of an identity located in-between Carlism and emerging Spain's peripheral nationalisms, in this case the Basque one.

== Family and youth ==
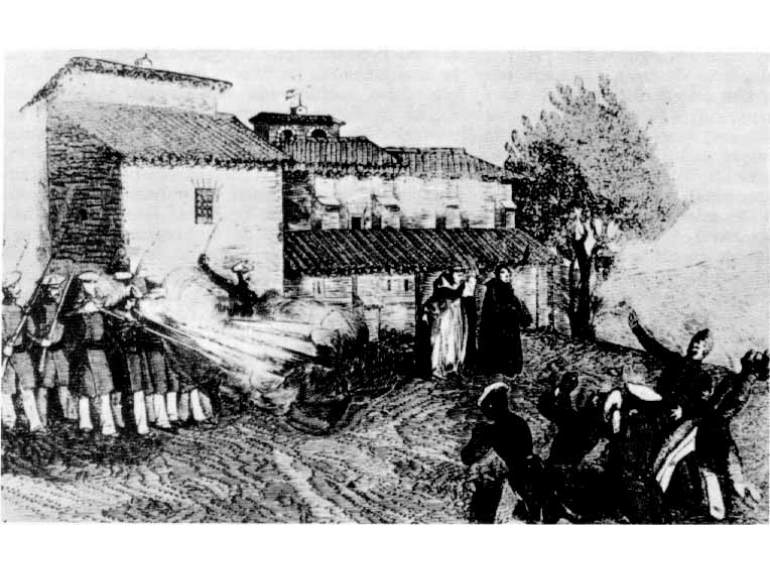
Estella, First Carlist War

Origins of the Irujo family are not clear; some claim they descended from a noble Urra family of Améscoa in Western Navarre. It is certain that in the mid-18th century one branch of the Irujos lived in Tafalla; Daniel's grandfather, Matías Irujo Pascual (1757–1832), apart from having been an alpargatero owned some 9 ha of vineyards and 12 ha of arable land; he was rich enough to build an own house in the city. Married he had 11 children, born between 1780 and 1803; all except one settled on the rural economy. It is not clear what language was spoken in the family; in the late 18th century Tafalla remained on the borderlines of Basque-speaking zone. The youngest son and Daniel's father, Manuel Irujo Apastegui (1803–1871), entered the Pamplona seminar but abandoned it and completed law in Zaragoza, where he initially practiced. During the First Carlist War he joined the legitimists holding some admin posts in Estella and suffered some repression afterwards, when back in Tafalla. This did not prevent his law practice and career in local administration, though he failed in a Cortes bid.

In 1850 Manuel married Engracia Urra Jordan (1825-1885), daughter to an Estella official, whom he probably met during the war. The couple left Tafalla – according to some accounts due to an anti-Carlist backlash suffered – and moved to the bride's house in Estella. Engaged in local business, Manuel went on as lawyer. In the 1860s elected as mayor for procedural reasons he could not assume the post, yet in 1866 he was elected to Navarrese Diputación Provincial, due to poor health barely serving. Manuel and Engracia had 5 children, born between 1850 and 1862; Daniel was the only surviving son. It is not clear whether the family spoke Basque or Spanish; in Estella of the time only few spoke "en vasco".

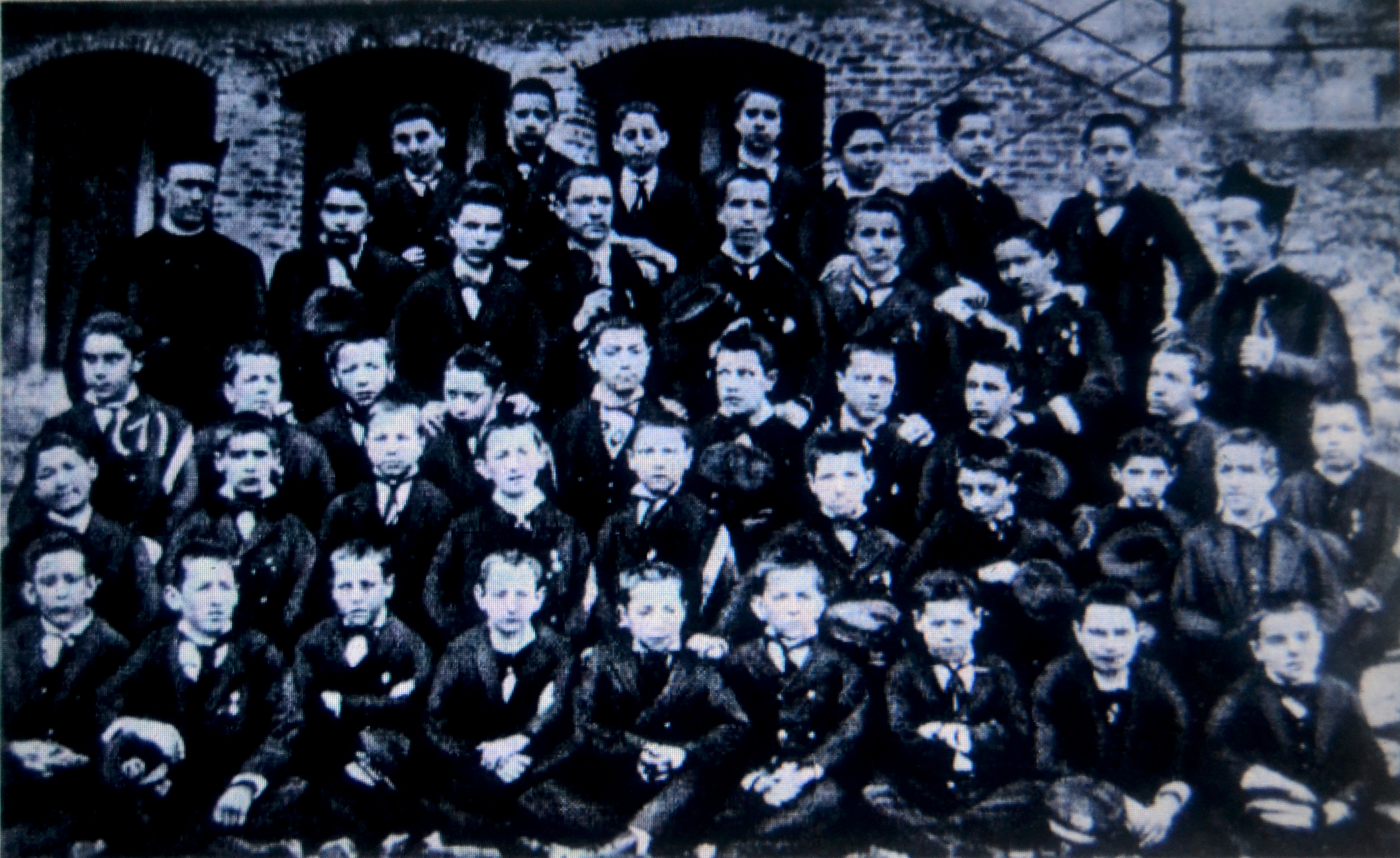
Orduña pupils, 1870s

The young Alejandro María Daniel Irujo and his siblings were brought up in religious ambience. In the mid-1870s he was sent away from Estella, then a Carlist capital, to the Bétharram college near Pau. Prior to 1876 he moved to the Jesuit Orduña establishment, where he met the likes of Sabino Arana and Juan Olazábal. In 1878 he commenced law studies in Valladolid, graduating in derecho civíl y canónico in 1882. Evading military service, in 1883 he settled in Pamplona. Employed by the law office of his brother-in-law, he set up his own office following a move back to Estella in 1885. In 1890 Daniel married Aniana Ollo Elordi (1866–1950), Estella-born daughter of a local pharmacist and concejal. The couple had 10 children, born between 1891 and 1910. Most were engaged in Basque nationalist politics. The best known, Manuel, was minister in the Republican government during the Civil War. Also other sons held posts in Basque Republican administration, two of them – Andrés and Pello - known for their contribution to the Basque culture during exile years in Southern America. Some lived long enough to return to Spain following the death of Franco.

== Early career ==
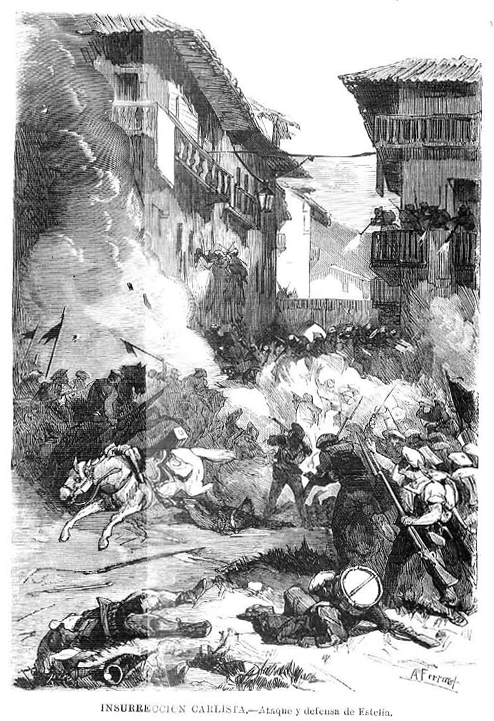
Estella, Third Carlist War

In historiography political antecedents of Daniel are summarized as "scarcely homogeneous". Some of his paternal uncles engaged in Tafallese Cristinos militia and ancestors of his wife were distinguished Estella Liberals. It is clear, however, that the Carlist leaning prevailed; apart from Daniel's father and other paternal uncles also his maternal uncle, Sebastián Urra Jordán, held various posts in the party and represented it in the Cortes. As it was him appointed by late Manuel cabezalero of his children, Urra has contributed to their Carlist outlook. Already as a child in Carlist-held Estella Daniel used to collect unexploded cartridges fired by the governmental troops to make sure they do not hurt the Carlists, and he admitted to having "sucked" Carlism when a child. Education in Orduña college, managed by the Jesuits, is likely to have reinforced this stand; also during academic years in Valladolid Irujo remained in the company of Carlism-minded friends.

Nothing is known about Irujo's engagement either in the Carlist youth organization or in the party structures in the 1880s. However, he demonstrated particular interest in one element of the Carlist political program: restoration of traditional legal provincial establishments, the fueros. He seemed heavily influenced by his brother-in-law Estanislao Aranzadi, co-founder of Asociación Euskara de Navarra and its daily, Lau-buru; politically the grouping tended to fuerismo, with return to foral regime placed as the central if not exclusive objective. Apart from personal links and subscription to fuerista periodicals Irujo did not engage politically before in 1887 he was offered a job in the Jesuit Deusto college. He assumed the chair of Procedimientos Judiciales y Práctica Forense and settled in Bilbao either that year or the following one. His focus on fueros matured into a treaty, produced at unspecified time though most likely in the mid-1890s, and intended as sort of a textbook for his Deusto disciples. It advanced a thesis that until 1839 Navarre and the Vascongadas enjoyed the status of sovereign entities, united with the rest of peninsula mostly by means of personal union.

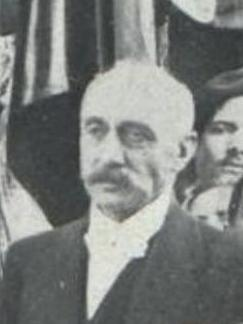
Joaquin Llorens

In 1893 Navarre was rocked by the so-called Gamazada, opposition to a ministerial attempt to scrap remnants of the provincial fiscal autonomy. The Carlist deputy to the Cortes from Estella, Juan Vázquez de Mella, in name of "nosotros, fueristas y regionalistas" voiced against the project in the parliament, joined by another Carlist and the only non-Navarrese deputy who voted against it, Joaquín Llorens. Irujo most likely remained in touch with the two; when Llorens was cheered in Estella upon return from Madrid, he delivered his triumphant addresses from the balcony of Irujo's house. Similarly, the following year Irujo was in Castejón, the first major Navarrese train station, organizing welcome of the Navarrese diputación returning from negotiations in Madrid.

== Arana link ==
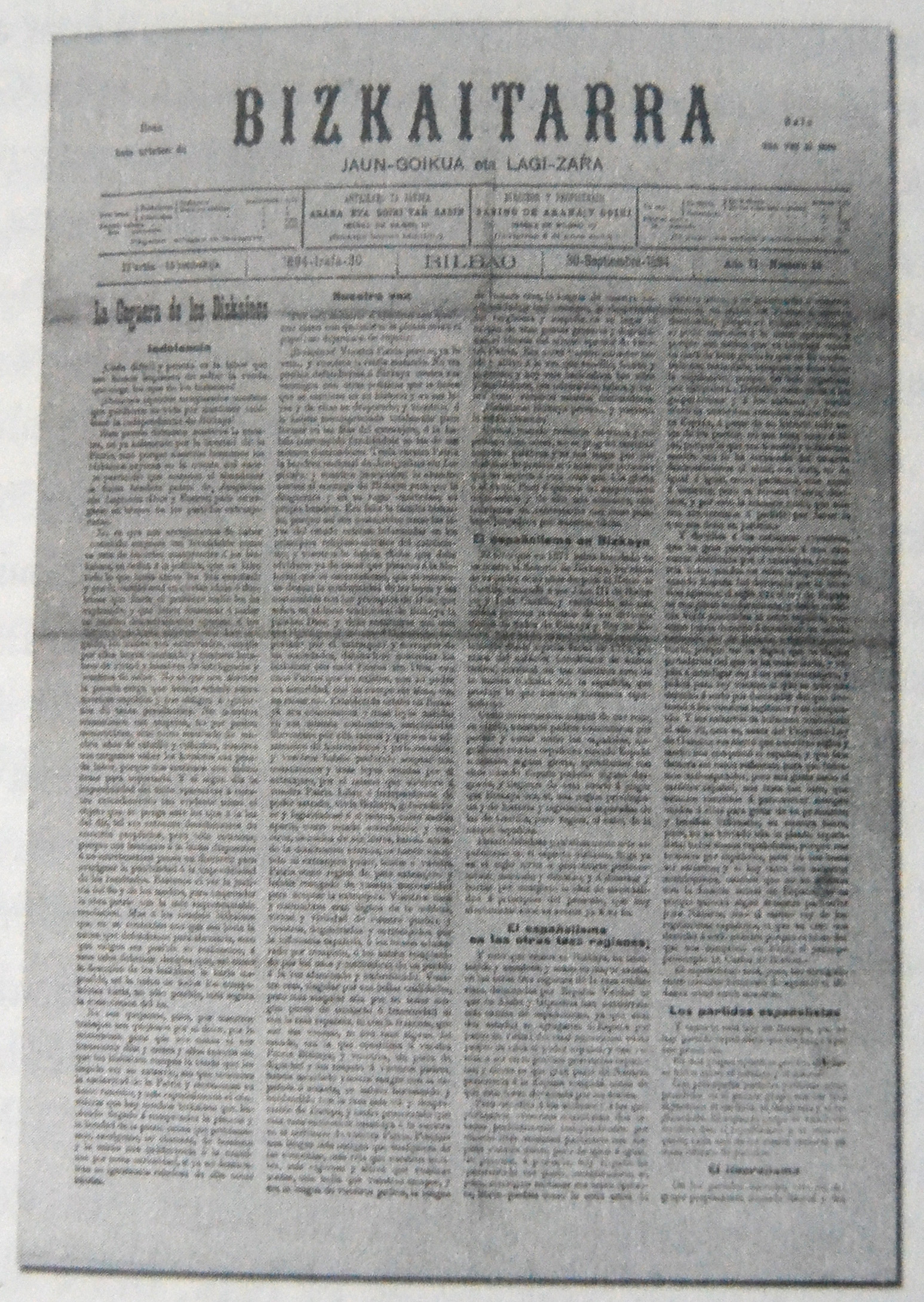
Bizkaitarra, 1894

When in Bilbao Irujo resumed his friendship with the Arana brothers and in 1894 he subscribed to their review Bizkaitarra, though he did not join the early Basque nationalist organisation, Euskeldun Batzokija. During Gamazada he introduced Arana to the Navarrese fueristas; it was also in 1894 that at one point, taken over by Arana's harangue, he declared "I am your man, though I keep being a Carlist". His relations with the Aranas got closer; when in 1895 they faced trial, charged with multiple offences related to reportedly Basque-nationalist, anti-Spanish background, Irujo was initially supposed to defend Luis Arana in court. The plan was changed and in 1896 he defended Sabino Arana, freed on bail. Irujo's defense line was that Arana violated no law; he went on to claim that his client campaigned against 1841 regulations, which he was perfectly entitled to do, apart from representing legitimate aspirations of "pueblo euskaldun", embodied in the God and Old Rights slogan. With Irujo fully successful, Arana was absolved.

In the late 1890s Irujo and the Aranas got even closer. In 1897 Irujo was asked to review El Partido Carlista y los Fueros Vasko-Nabarros, a pamphlet written by Arana and denouncing the Carlist vision as "plain regionalism". Formally Irujo was to ensure that the document provides no basis for legal action; it is neither clear whether he contributed to the political content nor how he reconciled the task with his Carlist identity. He helped the Aranas also otherwise, e.g. propagating their new periodical, Berritarra, in Estella, or contributing to pro-nationalist turn of a Pamplona daily El Fuerista. However, Irujo fell short of open political access to the Aranistas and their Partido Nacionalista Vasco. Prior to the 1898 elections to the Biscay diputación provincial Sabino Arana suggested that Irujo runs as his representative, but the latter declined the offer. His exact views are not clear; it is not known what his opinion was about the conflict and rapprochement between the Aranistas and Euskalerriacos or general twists and turns of the PNV strategy. At some point between 1899 and 1902 he entered Centro Vasco in Bilbao and subscribed to militant nationalist periodicals, La Patria and Euskalduna.

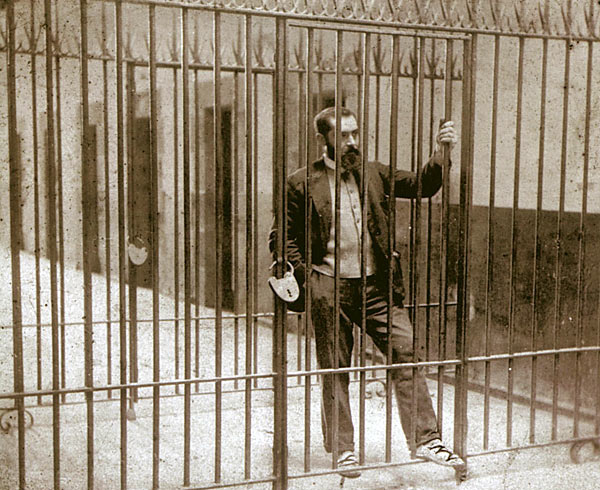
Arana in prison

In 1902 Sabino Arana was detained in relation to a telegram message he intended to send to president Roosevelt, congratulating him on recognition of Cuba, until 1898 the Spanish possession. The charges advanced referred to assault on Spanish territorial integrity. The defendant again asked Irujo to represent him. In general terms the defense mounted was very much similar to that of 1896, pointing to Basque rights and revocation of the 1840s regulations; Irujo reiterated his claim that nationalism was not equal to separatism. In terms of specific charges he argued that the telegram message intended expressed admiration and nothing more. At the final stage aided by Teodoro Aguirre, Irujo again emerged triumphant; the defendant was acquitted. He refused to charge his client and maintained close friendship with Sabino Arana until the latter's death in 1903.

== Estella oak affair ==
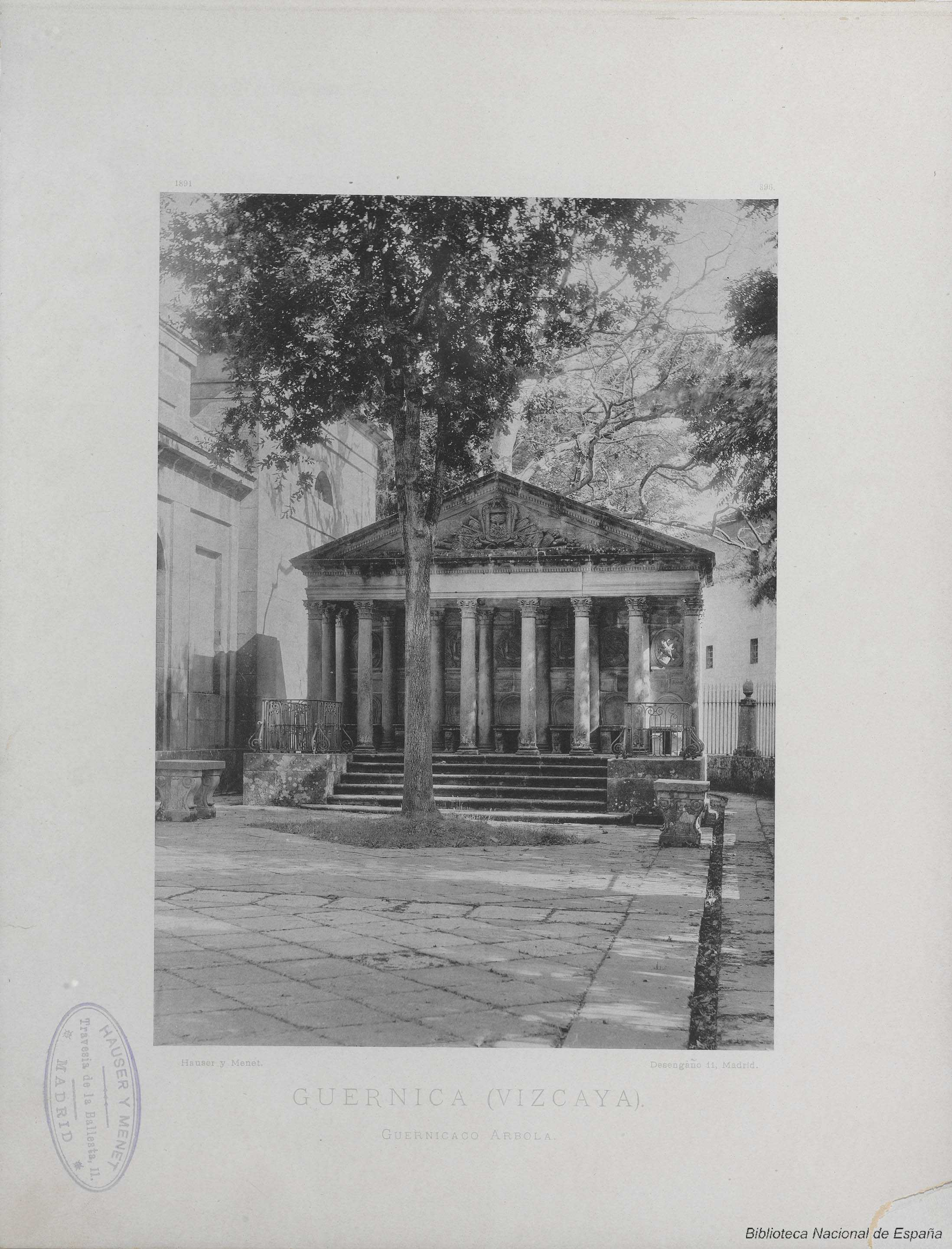
Guernica oak, 1890s

Throughout the entire Bilbao period Irujo maintained close links with Navarre and with Estella. Around 1904 he returned to his native city; exact reasons remain unclear and perhaps are related to taking care of local family business. He re-entered the local Carlist círculo; around that time the Carlist jefe in Vascongadas, Tirso Olazábal, offered him the party jefatura in the merindad of Estella and Irujo accepted. For the first time he also openly engaged in political strife. In the local realm dominated by the Conservatives and the Carlists, in 1905 he decided to represent the latter when running for the Estella ayuntamiento; PNV at the time did not have its representatives in the area and explicitly banned their sympathizers from voting other parties. Irujo was successful and though initially his mandate was revoked on procedural ground, he was eventually reinstated in early 1906. In line with official requirements, he declared his political affiliation as Carlist. The first year of his tenure was a routine one, perhaps except minor Carlist political demonstrations he took part in.

In 1908 the Aranista Centro Vasco of Bilbao used the services of Irujo's brother-in-law Aranzadi to offer the Estella city a shoot from the Guernica oak, a symbol of vasco-navarrese fueros. Irujo passed the proposal to ayuntamiento, which accepted the offer and in a pompous ceremony few months later planted the shoot at a patio of a local school. Navarrese press remained largely sympathetic, but a Liberal daily raised alarm, claiming that the local self-government fuels Basque separatism. As nationwide press followed suit the issue turned into a scandal, especially that the ceremony was marked by Basque and Navarrese flavor with almost total absence of official references to Spain; moderate Irujo's address was interrupted by angry "Viva España!" cries from the disgusted crowd. The council declared they had been unaware that the shoot originated from Centro Vasco and suggested having been maneuvered into a separatist affair, blaming Aranzadi and Irujo for the miscommunication.

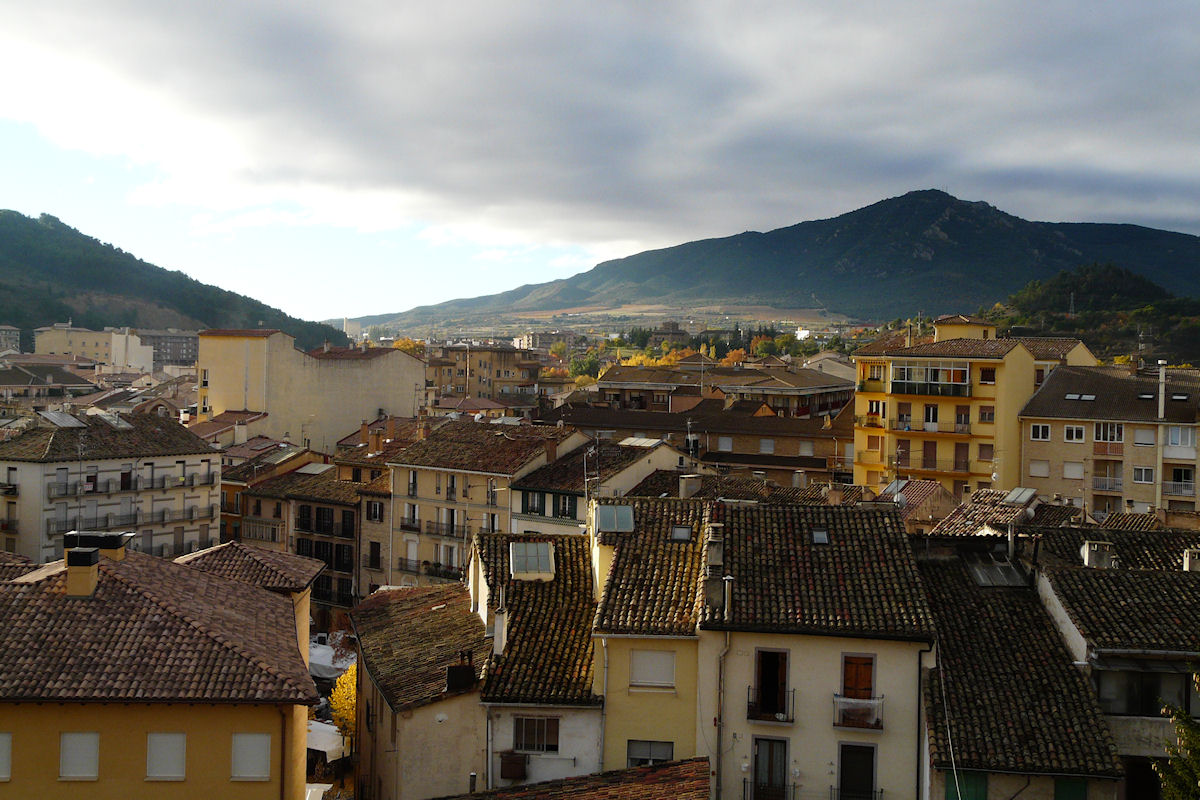
Estella

At the council sittings and in the press Irujo claimed that ayuntamiento was perfectly aware of the shoot origins, yet his arguments were rejected. The shoot was sent back to Centro Vasco and replaced by new ones, officially provided by the Biscay diputación. They were planted 3 weeks after the first ceremony. The re-implantation was an equally public though somewhat less pompous event; this time the Spanish and Navarrese features were carefully balanced, while the Basque ones were absent. Embittered with the city council blaming him for the affair, in the immediate aftermath Irujo ceased to attend its sittings, excusing himself for the absence. Later in 1908 the ayuntamiento admitted he was right, but this did not make Irujo change his mind. In early 1909 the mayor and his deputy resigned; technically, as segundo teniente de alcalde Irujo was becoming the interim alcalde. At this point he formally resigned his counselor mandate and did not stand in the successive elections of May 1909.

== From Carlist to Nationalist ==
Carlist standard from 1935

Initially the Carlist El Pensamiento Navarro acknowledged the first implantation with sympathy, praising the homage to "nuestras libertades tradicionales" and complaining only about lack of Irujo's references to Carlist champions of Navarrese rights like Llorens. However, soon the party press – especially in Vascongadas – assumed a hostile tone; the Gipuzkoan La Voz de Guipúzcoa lambasted Irujo as "concejal reaccionario" and El Correo de Guipúzcoa linked the event to venomous anti-Spanish separatism. Carlist circles and provincial leaders were sending messages congratulating the ayuntamiento on their decision to send the original shoot back. Another Carlist in the council, Nicanor Larráinzar Senosiáin, led an all-out charge on Irujo, also publicly, claiming that his support for the Aranistas was incompatible with Carlism. Irujo denied separatist charges, charged his opponent with political opportunism and initially confirmed his Carlist identity. Things changed when Tirso Olazábal congratulated Larráinzar on his stand. In a public letter to Olazábal Irujo considered himself disauthorised; speculating that apparently he had been erroneous as to fuerista objectives of the Carlists, he declared leaving Carlism.

In a letter to Luis Arana Irujo proclaimed that from then on he would not be any "carlo-bizkaitarra", but "nacionalista vasco a secas". However, when in late 1908 offered a post in Navarrese Partido Nacionalista Vasco structures, he declined. The reasons are not clear. Some scholars speculate that aware of growing controversy between Arana and Aranzadi, Irujo could have not brought himself to taking a stand; another reason might have been growing rivalry between a radical Navarrese wing of Evangelista de Ibero and a more moderate one championed by his brother-in-law. Nevertheless, he remained in touch with PNV activists both in Navarre and in Biscay. When their new Navarrese periodical Napartarra was launched in 1911, Irujo featured as one of its collaborators. Some students speculate that had it not been for his premature death, Irujo would have represented the Nationalists in forthcoming elections.

ikurriña

One scholar concludes that indeed, apparent Irujo's attempt to match Nationalist and Carlist objectives was mission impossible. He identifies Irujo's political position as "radical fuerismo", its essence being reversal to pre-1839 regime. Deprived of anti-Spanish venom and far from classic separatism, it envisioned Vasco-Navarrese area as sovereign entities united with other Spanish political bodies by a common monarch. It also did not include "los aspectos más negativos del aranismo", i.e. racism. It is not clear to what extent Irujo embraced nationalism as emerging in Europe of the time. He certainly acknowledged and appreciated separated Basque identity, yet it seems that his vision of Basque commonality was based on geography, religion, history and culture rather than on ethnicity. On the other hand, he hailed the newly invented icon of Basque nationalism, ikurriña, and called for unification of all Basques in "tierra euzkeriana". Another scholar considers Irujo a typical case of transitory identity from Carlism to peripheral nationalism, parallel to those of Vayreda (Catalonia), Brañas (Galicia) and Pereda (Cantabria). One more author considers Irujo irrelevant when discussing relations between "fuerismo tradicionalista" and "nacionalismo vasco".

== See also ==
- Carlism
- Basque nationalism
- Manuel de Irujo
- Pello Irujo
- Andrés de Irujo
- Guernica oak
