= Lhasa (disambiguation) =

Lhasa is the urban district of the City of Lhasa, Tibet Autonomous Region, China.

Lhasa may also refer to:

== Places ==
- Lhasa (city), the larger administrative region and city that includes the urban district of Lhasa
  - Lhasa Gonggar Airport
  - Lhasa railway station
  - Lhasa West railway station
- Lhasa River, a river of Tibet
- Lhasa terrane, a geologic terrain in Tibet
- Lhasa Nunatak, a rock ridge in Antarctica

== Other uses ==
- 7859 Lhasa, a minor planet
- LHASA, a computer program that aids in total synthesis
- Lhasa de Sela (1972–2010), American-born singer-songwriter
- Lhasa (Lhasa album), 2009
- Lhasa (La'cryma Christi album), 1998
- Lhasa Apso, a dog breed
- Chinese destroyer Lhasa

== See also ==
- Lahsa (disambiguation)
- Lasa (disambiguation)
- Lassa (disambiguation)
