= Lahsa =

Lahsa may refer to:

- Lahsa Apso, a dog breed originating in Tibet
- Lahsa Eyalet, an eyalet of the Ottoman Empire, now part of Kuwait and Qatar
- Los Angeles High School of the Arts (LAHSA), in Central Los Angeles, California, U.S.
- Los Angeles Homeless Services Authority

== See also ==
- Al-Hasa (disambiguation)
- Lhasa (disambiguation)
- Lassa (disambiguation)
