= Lassas =

Lassas is a surname. Notable people with the surname include:

- Åke Lassas (1924–2009), Swedish ice hockey player
- Fredrik Lassas (born 1996), Finnish football player

== Places ==
- Lassila, a neighbourhood of Helsinki known as Lassas in Swedish

== See also ==
- Lassa (disambiguation)
