= Lassa (surname) =

Lassa is a surname. Notable people with the surname include:

- Julie Lassa (born 1970), American politician
- Nick Lassa (1898–1964), American football player
