= Basque Republic =

Proposed sovereign state

"The Basque national flag has a red background, with a green saltire and an overlaid white cross" (Article 1)

The Basque Republic (Basque: Euskal Errepublika) was a project for an independent Basque Country proposed in 1941 by Manuel de Irujo, at that moment the main representative of the Basque Government in London.

== Precedents ==
See also Govern d'Euzkadi (in Catalan).

During the Spanish Civil War, the Second Spanish Republic had allowed an autonomous government in those Basque areas of Spain that had not been taken by the Nationalist (later Francoist) side, i.e., Biscay and parts of Gipuzkoa. This government was formed by Basque nationalists (EAJ-PNV and Acción Nacionalista Vasca) and leftists (the Spanish Socialist Workers' Party and Communist Party).

In 1937, the Basque Army surrendered in Santoña to the Italian Corpo Truppe Volontari and the Basque leaders who managed to escape went to Catalonia or France. After the defeat of the Republican side (1 April 1939), the free Basque leaders were refuged in Europe and the Americas. Later in 1939, the German invasion of Poland unleashed the Second World War. France quickly fell before the Wehrmacht. Under a false identity, the Basque President José Antonio Aguirre traveled north from France trying to sail to the United States.

== The plan ==
At this time, Irujo promoted a Basque National Council (Consejo Nacional de Euzkadi/Euzkadi'ko Batzar Nagusia, formally established on 11 July 1940) inspired by the exile governments and committees forming among European refugees in Britain. Expecting that Francoist Spain would join the Axis in the war, Irujo bet on an Allied victory and tried to establish a provisional authority capable of negotiating a new status for the Basque Country with the British government, the Free French and the eventual Spanish government. He established an alliance with Catalan nationalists in Britain who had formed their own Catalan National Council. He planned to have the south of the Pyrenees divided between a Basque state and a Catalan one and so presented a joint declaration on 18 January 1941 before the British Minister of State.

He redacted a "foreproject for a Constitution of the Basque Republic". It would be an independent state as a democratic republic. Its territory would cover that of the Kingdom of Navarre under Sancho the Greater, excluding the French Basque country to gain the support of Charles de Gaulle. Its limits would be:

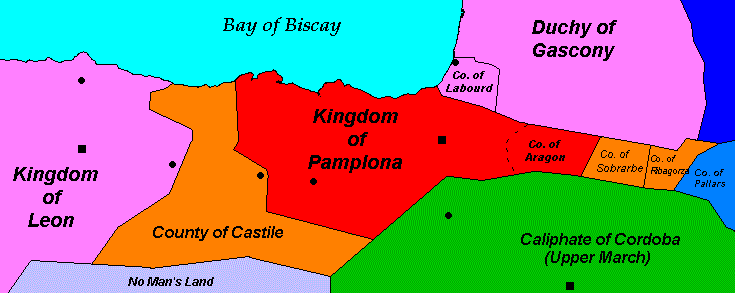
Domains of Sancho III the Greater. The Basque Republic would cover most of the red area and some of the pink areas.

...on the North the Pyrenees and the Bay of Biscay, on the Easte the Gállego river, on the South the Ebro river until Gallur and the water divisory between the Ebro and the Duero basins from Moncayo on the whole extension of both vertients, and on the West cape Ajo (Peña Cantábrica).
Title I, Article 5.

This would include areas of Burgos, Cantabria, Rioja and Aragon whose Basqueness was at most historic and where Basque nationalism was inexistent.

The Basque state would be relatively interventionist, protectionist and paternalist, following the social doctrine of the Catholic Church as assumed by the Basque Nationalist Party. Article 52 of Title V marked the requirements for the President of the Republic:

...male, citizen of the state, son of parents of Basque nature and ancestry, counting at least thirty years of age and being in the full enjoyment of his civil and political rights.

An additional chapter opened a chance to join other territories:

The Cortes are authorized to stipulate with democratic state representations of the continental Basque Country and the peninsular nations, the agreed regime of a confederal character que suits the right of the Basque Nation...

Irujo would later try to negotiate with the Free French the creation of a Basque Battalion, dissolved formally on 23 May 1942.

== Criticism ==
In October 1942, the news of the safe arrival of Aguirre in Uruguay reached London. At the Basque World Congress of Paris (1956), he would thank the labour of the Basque National Council, but his politics would not follow Irujo's Constitution.

It would be the Socialist Indalecio Prieto who would harshly criticize Irujo's irredentism. He remarks that the Cantabrian ports of Castro-Urdiales, Laredo, and Santoña, along with the industry of Reinosa, would be part of Euzkadi. He likens Irujo's map to Hitler's and shows his surprise because Laburdi and Zuberoa, areas of the French Basses Pyrenees where Basque is spoken, are left out of the new state. In the same Mexican newspaper, Julio Jauregui denies the accusations of separatism, interpreting Irujo's foreproject as a confederal blueprint. Jauregui remarks that the democratic will of the newly annexed citizens would be necessary, just as some people in Logroño are showing interest in the Basque autonomy projects.

After the dissolution of the BNC by Aguirre, Irujo would dedicate himself to literature and a project for an Iberian Community of Nations, including Portugal, that did not have much echo.
