= Auñamendi Encyclopedia =

Encyclopedia of Basque culture and society

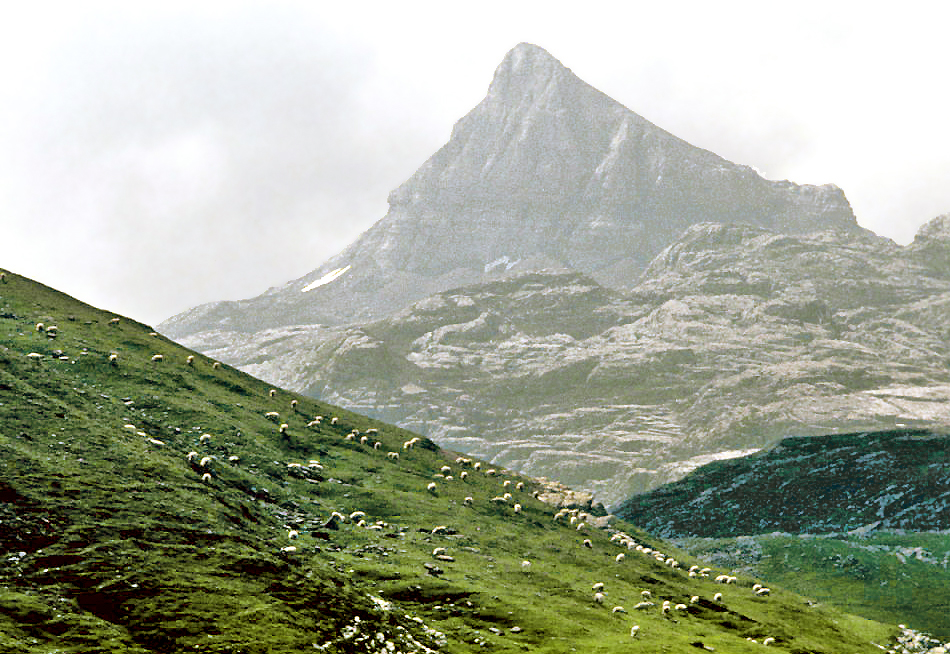
It is named after Auñamendi, the Pic d'Anie in Western Pyrenees.

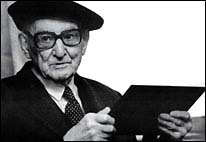
Bernardo Estornés Lasa in 1997

The Auñamendi Encyclopedia (Spanish: Enciclopedia Auñamendi, Basque: Auñamendi Eusko Entziklopedia) is the largest encyclopedia of Basque culture and society, with 120,000 articles and more than 67,000 images. It is published in Spanish.

Founded in 1958 by the Estornés Lasa brothers, Bernardo and Mariano. He began publishing in 1969 with the help of the Auñamendi publishing house. Since 1996, Eusko Ikaskuntza has taken over the task of digitizing, cataloging and putting it on the network.

The new encyclopedia is based on the Auñamendi encyclopedia by Bernardo Estornés Lasa, which began in 1933 and whose first and last volumes were released in 1960 and 2008 respectively. There were 58 volumes. The contents of the Auñamendi Encyclopedia are generated by a large group of specialists in different subjects who guarantee the level of quality and scientific rigor of the encyclopedia. All contributions are analyzed and contrasted by the experts at Eusko Ikaskuntza.
