= Germinal Esgleas =

Catalan anarchist politician (1903–1981)

General Secretary of the National Confederation of Labour
- (in exile) [reunified]
- In office August 1969 – August 1973
- Preceded by: Ferran Alemany
- Succeeded by: Marciano Sigüenza
- In office October 1963 – August 1967 Serving with: Francisco Calle (1962–1964); Cipriano Damiano (1964–1965); Francisco Royano (1965–1968); (interior)
- Preceded by: Roque Santamaría
- Succeeded by: Ferran Alemany
- (in exile) [Orthodox faction]
- In office July 1952 – August 1958 Serving with: Miguel Vallejo (1952–1955); Ramón Liarte (1955–1957); Ginés Alonso (1957–1958); (possibilists): Cipriano Damiano (1951–1953); (interior)
- Preceded by: Martín Villarupia
- Succeeded by: Roque Santamaría
- In office May 1945 – October 1947 Serving with: Ramón Álvarez (1945–1947); (possibilists): José Expósito (1945); Lorenzo Íñigo (1945–1946); Enric Marco (1946–1947); Antonio Ejarque (1947); (interior)
- Preceded by: Juanel Molina
- Succeeded by: Josep Peirats
- (in exile) [pre-split]
- In office June 1939 – June 1943 Serving with: Esteve Pallarols (1939); Manuel López (1940); Celedonio Pérez (1940–1941); Eusebio Azañedo (1942–1943); (interior)
- Preceded by: Mariano Vázquez
- Succeeded by: José Germán

Personal details
- Born: Josep Esgleas i Jaume; 5 October 1903 Malgrat de Mar, Catalonia, Spain
- Died: 21 October 1981 (aged 78) Tolosa, Occitania, France
- Domestic partner: Federica Montseny
- Children: 3
- Organisations: National Confederation of Labour (CNT); Iberian Anarchist Federation (FAI); Spanish Libertarian Movement (MLE)
- Movement: Anarchism in Spain

Josep Esgleas i Jaume (1903–1981), commonly known by his pseudonym Germinal Esgleas, was a Catalan anarcho-syndicalist. He joined the National Confederation of Labour (CNT) at an early age, going on to teach at one of the organisation's rationalist schools in Mataró. After the proclamation of the Second Spanish Republic, he joined the Iberian Anarchist Federation (FAI) and began writing for La Revista Blanca, in which he advocated for a hardline stance against moderate syndicalism. During the Spanish Civil War, he formed a commission to purchase weapons for the Republic and was briefly considered for the role of Minister of Economy in the Catalan government. Towards the end of the war, he participated in a plot to oust the government of Juan Negrín. With the Nationalist victory, he fled to France with his wife Federica Montseny and their children. After spending years incarcerated in concentration camps and prisons, he was released during the Liberation of France. He then became one of the foremost leaders of the orthodox faction of the CNT and was elected as the organisation's General Secretary, a post he served in for most of its time in exile.

== Biography ==
=== Early life and activism ===
Josep Esgleas was born in the Catalan town of Malgrat de Mar on 5 October 1903. He was raised in Morocco, where his entire family was stabbed to death, forcing him to find work in the wood and textiles industries at a young age. He joined the National Confederation of Labour (CNT), becoming secretary of its trade union branch in Calella at the age of 17. Following the establishment of the dictatorship of Primo de Rivera, on 8 December 1923, the CNT held a regional plenum in Mataró, where the Catalan regional committee was reorganised and Esgleas was elected as regional secretary. Esgleas recommended that the organisation continue to openly operate its unions, while also preparing to go underground in the event of political repression. Over the subsequent months, several CNT leaders were arrested and many members fled to France. In 1928, after hosting a clandestine plenary session, Esgleas himself was arrested and imprisoned.

After his release in 1929, he moved back to Mataró, where he went to work as a teacher at a school run by the local glass workers' union of the CNT. He distinguished his school's rationalist approach to education with that of the Ferrer movement, as the latter sought to indoctrinate children with anarchist ideas, while he sought to give students the information they needed to come to their own conclusions. At the school, which counted up to 300 students between the ages of 6 and 16, only one of the five educators was a certified teacher, but Esgleas reported that they had similar levels of resources as the area's state schools. The school taught all of its students history, literacy and mathematics, and provided specialised classes for gifted students. According to Esgleas, the CNT organised rationalists schools such as his in most of the towns and cities of Catalonia.

Following the proclamation of the Second Spanish Republic in 1931, Esgleas attended an extraordinary national congress of the CNT, as a delegate for Blanes, Calella and Malgrat. By this time, he had already joined the Iberian Anarchist Federation (FAI) and adopted an intransigent line against anarchist involvement in politics. Esgleas protested against moves by the treintista faction to appeal to the government for legal recognition, although he ultimately accepted the motion to do so. In October 1931, Esgleas joined the editorial team of the CNT newspaper Solidaridad Obrera, which had come under the control of the FAI. He then lent his support to the hardline anarchist position of Joan Montseny, the editor of La Revista Blanca, which took a critical stance against moderate syndicalism. As the schism between the FAI and treintista faction intensified, the CNT lost many of its members, but Esgleas declared that he preferred they lose members and maintain their principles rather than see the CNT become "a shapeless leviathan".

During this time, Esgleas met Joan's daughter, Federica Montseny, with whom he had a life-long relationship. Together, through their "natural union", they had three children: Vida (b. 1933), Germinal (b. 1938) and Blanca (b. 1941). Esgleas wrote several articles for La Revista Blanca, in which he proclaimated that "to reduce anarchism to a more or less synthetic, schematic programme is to reduce it to more phrases, an absolutely negative work." In its December 1934 issue, Esgleas criticised the New Deal, which he believed to be exemplary of the failures of capitalism. In a review of his partner's novel, El Hijo de Clara, Esgleas described eugenics as a "calculation of probabilities" rather than something which could be scientifically guaranteed. Esgleas also contributed to the newspaper El Luchador, another publication run by the Montseny family, which was fiercely critical of clericalism and demanded the dissolution of the Civil Guard.

=== Civil War ===
By the outbreak of the Spanish Civil War in 1936, Esgleas was already a secondary leader of the Catalan anarchist movement and his status in the movement only increased as the war went on. Together with Facundo Roca Gascó and Manuel Mascarell, he formed a commission to purchase weapons for the war effort.

After the collapse of the Catalan government in the wake of the May Days, in June 1937, the CNT participated in negotiations for the establishment of a new cabinet. Esgleas was selected to serve as Minister of Economy, but he never took up his post. The CNT ultimately pulled out from rejoining the government after the appointment of the Catalan nationalist Pere Bosch-Gimpera as a minister without portfolio; it was thereafter excluded from the Catalan government.

In 1938, Esgleas joined the Catalan regional committee of the FAI. In May of that year, he attended a meeting of the CNT National Committee, during which the FAI protested continued collaboration with the Popular Front, but was ultimately forced to accept it. The following month, he gave a report to a plenum of the Catalan libertarian movement, in which he spoke out against defeatism and called for the strengthening of the libertarian movement in order to win the war. Along with Mariano R. Vázquez and Horacio Prieto, Esgleas was delegated by the CNT to a congress of the International Workers' Association (AIT), which voted to abandon the organisation's orthodox anarchist principles. Esgleas and Montseny later attended a meeting called by Joan Garcia Oliver, in which they discussed the possibility of a coup d'état to depose the government of Juan Negrín. They attempted to solicit support from Diego Martínez Barrio (President of the Congress of Deputies), Lluís Companys (President of the Government of Catalonia) and Manuel Azaña (President of the Republic), but the plot ultimately went nowhere, as Barrio and Azaña both believed it was too late for them to overthrow Negrín.

=== Exile ===
With the Nationalist Catalonia Offensive closing in, on 9 February 1939, Esgleas and his family fled to France. Esgleas himself was initially interned in the Argelers concentration camp and then confined in Combs-la-Ville. After making his way to Paris, Esgleas participated in the foundation of the Spanish Libertarian Movement (MLE) and was appointed as deputy secretary of its executive committee. Esgleas took over as the organisation's general secretary in June 1939, following the death of Vázquez. He set to work, helping to relocate Spanish Republican refugees. In July 1939, when a large number of Spanish Republican refugees arrived in Mexico on board the Ipanema, Esgleas and Montseny reported to Mexican president Lázaro Cárdenas that 71% of the boat's passengers were anarchists or communists. In October 1939, Esgleas met with Génesis López Claver, a delegate from the National Committee of the CNT that had remained behind in Spain, who he offered 10,000 francs to fund an escape network. He held back from offering more from the reserve funds of the MLE, which amounted to 4.5 million francs, due to the sustained financial difficulties the organisation was facing.

Following the outbreak of World War II, Esgleas opposed the activities of the Ponzán group, as the group worked together with the British Secret Service (MI6). After the fall of France to Nazi Germany, he continued to coordinate the MLE from his headquarters in Salon. He viewed armed struggle as a means to carry out a social revolution, but considered it inappropriate under the Nazi occupation or in Vichy France. In February 1941, he expelled members of the Workers' Labour Party (Spanish: Partido Obrero del Trabajo; POT), conceived as a political wing of the CNT, from the MLE. In October 1941, Esgleas was arrested by Vichy authorities and sentenced to three years in prison. He was transferred between prisons in Tolosa, Manzac and Nontronh. In June 1944, he was freed by Maquis during the Liberation of France. In November 1944, he was reunited with his family and they moved to Panhac.

With the end of World War II, Esgleas positioned himself as the leading representative of orthodox anarcho-syndicalism, having come to believe that the anarchists had been defeated due to their abandonment of their own principles. He stood in opposition to general secretary Juan Manuel Molina, who supported collaboration with the Spanish Republican government in exile. Molina criticised Esgleas for not supporting the French Resistance and mismanaging MLE funds, allegations which Esgleas himself denied. Esgleas called for a reaffirming of the anarchist principle of anti-statism and for anarchists to cease collaboration with the exiled Republican government. The internal conflict came to a head at the Paris Congress of the CNT, which adopted the orthodox line and elected Esgleas as General Secretary, causing the organisation to split along factional lines. Esgleas' faction was joined by CNT members who had participated in the May Days, giving him a prominent position among those same people who he had urged to withdraw from the barricades.

He served as the General Secretary of the CNT in exile for a long period of time, being reelected as general secretary in 1946, 1952, 1963 and 1965. He also was appointed as general secretary of the AIT in 1963, and supported the activities of Defensa Interior. His leadership tendency, known as esgleísmo, became the dominant tendency of exiled anarchists and was valued differently by members of the CNT: some saw him as the "regenerator" of the organisation, while others criticised him for using anarchist orthodoxy in order to live off his salary as a paid official. Esgleas died in Tolosa on 12 October 1981.

== Selected works ==
- Sindicalismo: orientación doctrinal y táctica de los sindicatos obreros y la CNT (1935)
- Decíamos ayer. Verdades de todas horas (1936)

== Bibliography ==
- Aguilar, Kevan Antonio (2021). "From Comrades to Subversives: Mexican Secret Police and 'Undesirable' Spanish Exiles, 1939–60". Journal of Latin American Studies. 53 (1): 1–24. doi:10.1017/S0022216X20001017.
- Alexander, Robert J. (1999). The Anarchists in the Spanish Civil War. London: Janus Publishing Company. ISBN 978-1-85756-400-6.
- Arroyo Vázquez, María Luz (2005). "European views of the New Deal: The case of Spain". Journal of Transatlantic Studies. 3 (2): 217–237. doi:10.1080/14794010608656827.
- Casanova, Julián (2005). Preston, Paul (ed.). Anarchism, the Republic and Civil War in Spain: 1931–1939. Translated by Dowling, Andrew; Pollok, Graham. Routledge. ISBN 0-415-32095-X.
- Cleminson, Richard (2019). "From neo-Malthusianism to eugenics as a 'revolutionary conquest', 1920–1937". Anarchism and eugenics. Manchester University Press. pp. 113–167. doi:10.7765/9781526124470.00007.
- Evans, Danny (2019). "Uprooted cosmopolitans? The post-war exile of Spanish anarchists in Venezuela, 1945-1965". Journal of Iberian and Latin American Studies. 25 (2): 321–342. doi:10.1080/14701847.2019.1632037.
- Fredericks, Shirley F. (1976). "Federica Montseny and Spanish Anarchist Feminism". Frontiers: A Journal of Women Studies. 1 (3): 71–80. doi:10.2307/3346171. JSTOR 3346171.
- Gómez Casas, Juan (1986). Anarchist Organisation: The History of the F.A.I. Black Rose Books. ISBN 0-920057-40-3. OCLC 15252503.
- Herrerín, Ángel (2020). The Road to Anarchy: The CNT under the Spanish Second Republic (1931–1936). Sussex Academic Press. ISBN 9781789760316.
- Íñiguez, Miguel (2001). "Esgleas Jaume, Germinal". Esbozo de una enciclopedia histórica del anarquismo español (in Spanish). Madrid: Fundación de Estudios Libertarios Anselmo Lorenzo. pp. 201–202. ISBN 9788486864453. OCLC 807322760.
- Peirats, Josep (2005). Ealham, Chris (ed.). The CNT in the Spanish Revolution. Vol. 2. Translated by Sharkey, Paul; Ealham, Chris. Christie Books. ISBN 1-873976-24-0.
- Peirats, Josep (2006). Ealham, Chris (ed.). The CNT in the Spanish Revolution. Vol. 3. Translated by Sharkey, Paul; Ealham, Chris. Christie Books. ISBN 1-873976-29-1.
- Romanos, Eduardo (2011). "Factionalism in Transition: A Comparison of Ruptures in the Spanish Anarchist Movement". Sociology Lens. 24 (3): 355–380. doi:10.1111/j.1467-6443.2011.01401.x. ISSN 2832-580X.
- Segura i Mas, Antoni (2018). "The Catalan (and Spanish) Republicans under Nazism". In Irujo, Xavier; Solé, Queralt (eds.). Nazi Juggernaut in the Basque Country and Catalonia. University of Nevada. pp. 417–441. ISBN 978-1949805055.
- Soo, Scott (2016). The Routes to Exile: France and the Spanish Civil War refugees, 1939-2009. Manchester University Press. doi:10.7765/9781526102515. ISBN 9781526102515.
