= Manuel Adame =

Andalusian trade unionist and politician (1901–1945)

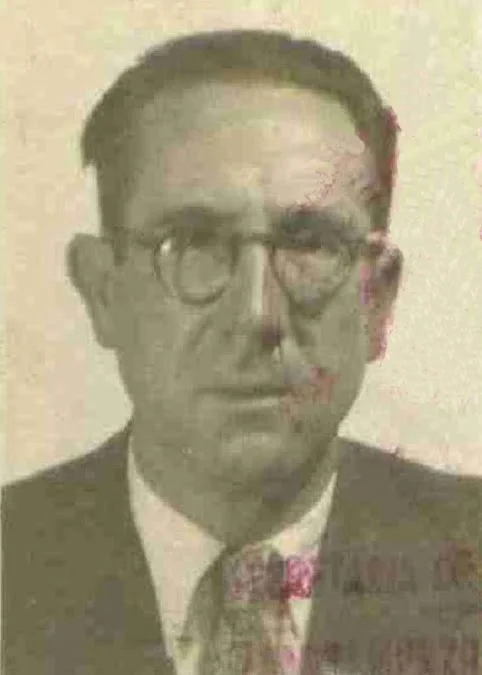
- Adame (c. 1939)

Member of the Congress of Deputies
- In office 1936–1939
- President: Manuel Azaña
- Prime Minister: José Giral (1936); Francisco Largo Caballero (1936–1937); Juan Negrín (1937–1939)
- Constituency: Province of Seville

General Secretary of the Unión General de Trabajadores in Seville
- In office 1933–1936

Member of the politburo of the Communist Party of Spain
- In office 1931–1932 Serving with José Bullejos, Gabriel León Trilla

General Secretary of the Confederación Nacional del Trabajo
- In office July 1923 – August 1923
- Preceded by: Salvador Seguí
- Succeeded by: Paulino Díez

Personal details
- Born: 1901 Seville, Andalusia, Spain
- Died: 3 April 1945 (aged 43–44) Acapulco, Mexico
- Citizenship: Spanish
- Party: Communist Party of Spain (1927–1932); Spanish Socialist Workers' Party (1933–1939)
- Other political affiliations: Confederación Nacional del Trabajo (c. 1920–1927); Unión General de Trabajadores (1933–1939)

Manuel Adame Misa (1901–1945) was an Andalusian trade unionist and politician. Initially an anarcho-syndicalist of the Confederación Nacional del Trabajo (CNT), in 1927, he became a leading member of the Communist Party of Spain (PCE) in Andalusia. In 1932, he was ejected from the PCE, due to his conflicts with the leadership of the Communist International, and subsequently joined the Unión General de Trabajadores (UGT) and Spanish Socialist Workers' Party (PSOE). He was active in the Republican side of the Spanish Civil War and, after its defeat, fled to Mexico, where he died.

== Biography ==
Manuel Adame Misa was born in 27.06.1901 in the Andalusian city of Seville. He worked as a day labourer and was a member of the Seville branch of the Confederación Nacional del Trabajo (CNT). In 1919, he was implicated in an attempted assassination of an employer and fled Andalusia to Portugal. Before long he had returned to Seville, where in July 1923, he attended the CNT's congress and was elected as the organisation's General Secretary. His time in the post was short, as on 16 August 1923, he was arrested for an attempted robbery.

The leader of a local communist group, which included José Díaz, Antonio Mije and Manuel Delicado among its members, in 1927, he joined the Communist Party of Spain (PCE) and was appointed as the head of its trade union section. From August of that year, in collaboration with the CNT's general secretary Joan Peiró, he pursued a strategy of communist entryism in the CNT. He head a "committee for the reconstruction of the CNT" in Seville, an internal faction which attempted to move the CNT towards Bolshevism and bring it into the Red International of Trade Unions. In December 1927, Adame was appointed as the PCE's regional secretary of Andalusia. By the proclamation of the Second Spanish Republic, he was already the undisputed leader of the PCE in Seville. From 1931 to 1932, he was a member of the PCE's central committee, and after that, he was a member of its political bureau.

In the 1931 Spanish local elections, Adame ran as a PCE candidate for the City Council of Seville, but he was unsuccessful. In the 1931 Spanish general election, Adame was presented as one of the PCE's candidates for the Constituent Cortes, but they failed to win any seats. In the by-election that took place in the Balearic Islands in October 1931, Adame was presented as the PCE's candidate. With 628 votes (1.88%), Adame came third, losing the election to Francesc Carreras Reura of Republican Action, who received 22,406 votes. He mostly received votes from dissident republicans and socialists, who were dissatisfied with Carreras' candidacy. More than three-quarters of his votes came from Palma, where he received 5.97% of the vote; he also received 6.99% of the vote in Capdepera and 6.45% of the vote in Pollença. He only received 8 votes in Menorca and 1 vote in Eivissa.

In the wake of the PCE's fourth congress in March 1932, the political bureau - which included José Bullejos, Gabriel León Trilla and Adame himself - was deposed due to their persistent clashes with the leadership of the Communist International. On 21 October 1932, Adame, Trilla and Bullejos were expelled from the PCE. The following year, Adame joined the Unión General de Trabajadores (UGT) and became its general secretary in Seville, as well as the leader of the local group of the Spanish Socialist Workers' Party (PSOE). His defection from the PCE to the PSOE-UGT intensified a communist smear campaign against him. He nevertheless continued his work as a trade union leader throughout the subsequent years, taking a leading role in the Revolution of 1934 in Seville, for which he was arrested.

During the 1936 Spanish general election, he was elected as a deputy of the PSOE for the province of Seville. When Adame received news of the Spanish coup of July 1936, he was in Benamahoma, where he organised Andalusian resistance to the coup. After the outbreak of the Spanish Civil War, he was delegated by the socialists to serve in the military command in Málaga, then aided Andalusian refugees in Barcelona, and headed the Under-Secretariat of Armaments.

After the defeat of the Republicans, he fled to France, where he was held in the Gurs internment camp. He moved to Mexico in October 1942, settling in Acapulco, where he ran a flower plantation. Manuel Adame Misa died on 3 April 1945. In the years after his death, he was frequently denounced as a "traitor" in the Spanish communist press. In 1949, Adame was sentenced in absentia by the Francoist dictatorship, but upon discovery that he had died in Mexico, the proceedings were dismissed.

== Selected works ==
- El comité Nacional de Reconstrucción y la política sindical del Partido (1931);
- Qué es el Bloque Obrero y Campesino (1932);
- ¿Alianza Obrera? ¡No! Frente Único, ésta es la salida (1934).

== Bibliography ==
- Company i Matas, Arnau (2015). La Segona República a Mallorca. Eleccions, partits polítics, mitjans de comunicació i gestió pública (PDF) (PhD) (in Catalan). Vol. 2. University of the Balearic Islands.
- García Márquez, José María (2009). La UGT de Sevilla: Golpe militar, resistencia y represión (1936-1950) (in Spanish) (2nd ed.). Fundación para el Desarrollo de los Pueblos de Andalucía. ISBN 978-84-937130-0-3.
- Gascón Ricao, Antonio (2018). "Manuel Adame Misa". Diccionario Biográfico electrónico (in Spanish). Real Academia de la Historia.
- Hermet, Guy (1972). Los comunistas en España: estudio de un movimiento político clandestino (PDF) (in Spanish). Paris: Ruedo ibérico. OCLC 802023014.
- Hinojosa Durán, José (1997). "Una fuente para el estudio del PCE durante la dictadura de Primo de Rivera: el informe del juez Salvador Alarcón". Norba Historia (14): 185–198. ISSN 0213-375X.
- Íñiguez, Miguel (2001). "Adame Misa, Manuel". Esbozo de una enciclopedia histórica del anarquismo español (in Spanish). Madrid: Fundación de Estudios Libertarios Anselmo Lorenzo. p. 16. ISBN 9788486864453. OCLC 807322760.
- Piemonte, Augusto (2019). "El centralismo verticalista de Victorio Codovilla y la reorganización del Partido Comunista de España en la Segunda República". Revista de la Red Intercátedras de Historia de América Latina Contemporánea (in Spanish). 1 (10): 1–7. ISSN 2250-7264.
