= Juan Manuel Molina Mateo =

Spanish anarcho-syndicalist and anarchist (1901-1984)

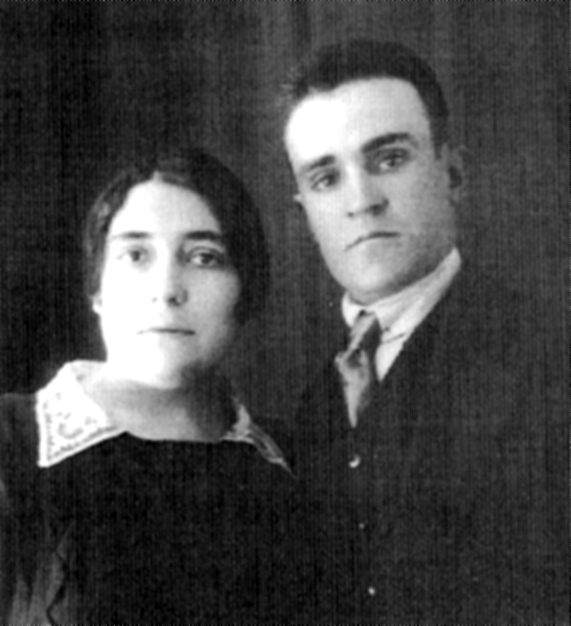

General Secretary of the CNT
- In office September 1943 – May 1945
- Preceded by: Mariano Vázquez
- Succeeded by: Germinal Esgleas

Personal details
- Born: August 4, 1901 Jumilla, Murcia
- Died: September 20, 1984 (aged 83) Barcelona, Catalunya
- Party: CNT-FAI
- Domestic partner: Lola Iturbe

Military service
- Allegiance: (Second Spanish Republic) Republican faction
- Branch/service: Spanish Republican Army
- Years of service: 1937-1939
- Unit: X Army Corps, XI Army Corps
- Battles/wars: Spanish Civil War: Aragon Offensive; Catalonia Offensive

Juan Manuel Molina Mateo (4 August 1901 - 20 September 1984), also known as Juanel, was a Spanish anarcho-syndicalist militant of the National Confederation of Labor and a founding member of the Iberian Anarchist Federation.

== Biography ==
=== Anarchist activist ===
Juan Manuel Molina Mateo was born in Jumilla on 4 August 1901, the son of farmers. Still a child, he worked on his parents' land, and he was not yet fifteen when he discovered anarchism through his readings.

In 1919 he was the vice president of the Jumilla Workers' Center and was arrested for the first time. He refused to do military service and escaped to Barcelona with false documentation. He agitated there within trade unions and anarchist groups. There he was a member of the anarchist union, the CNT, where in 1922 he became a member of the National Committee of the CNT and secretary of the National Commission for Relations with Anarchist Groups during the Catalan Anarchist Plenum. There he met his partner, Lola Iturbe, co-founder of the libertarian women's organization Mujeres Libres.

At the same time as he worked in construction in Barcelona and Granollers, he participated in the clandestine manufacture of grenades, to fight back against the dictatorship of Primo de Rivera. Persecuted for his political activities, he went into exile in France in 1926, where he continued to work in construction. He was the Secretary General of the Spanish-speaking Anarchist Groups and as such played a decisive role, in 1927, during the founding of the Iberian Anarchist Federation (FAI).

Arrested, he was interned in various prisons before being expelled from France. He then joined Brussels and became a member, alongside Francisco Ascaso and Buenaventura Durruti, of the International Anarchist Defense Committee until 1929. There he collaborated with articles in the magazine La Voz Libertaria.

Following the proclamation of the Second Spanish Republic, he returned to Barcelona where he replaced José Elizalde as the General Secretary of the FAI Peninsular Committee, a position he held until 1936, with the exception of 1932 when, imprisoned for insubordination, he was replaced by Juan Garcia Oliver. During this period, he was the editor of the FAI weekly Tierra y Libertad and of the magazine Tiempos Nuevos.

=== The Civil War, exile and prison ===
On 19 July 1936, he had been arrested but was released after the revolutionary wave caused by the failure in Barcelona of the 18 July coup. At that time he represented the CNT in the Supply Committee and after the events of May 1937, he will be Undersecretary of Defense of Catalonia. He rejected the post of commissioner of the People's Court of the Army and was political commissar of the X and XI Army Corps.

At the end of the Spanish Civil War he fled to France, where he was a delegate of the General Commission of the Spanish Libertarian Movement in the countryside of Occitania. In April 1939 he met in Nîmes with Francisco Ponzán Vidal to plan a strategy of return in the interior. The MLE leadership rejected him, which is why he broke with Germinal Esgleas Jaume. Esteve Pallarols i Xirgu acted as foreign delegate of the Secretary General of the CNT in the interior, and collaborated with the Ponzán Group and with Agustín Remiro Manero to help many persecuted Francoism flee to France.

He was one of the main architects of the reconstruction of the CNT in France, which is why he was often detained in 1940. During the occupation of France, he fought in the ranks of the French Resistance against the Nazis. He was elected General Secretary of the CNT from abroad at the Torniac Congress in September 1943. He opted to collaborate with the Governments of the Spanish Republican government in exile, which is why in the Muret plenary session in October 1944 he was replaced by Francisco Careño. He did not stand for reelection in the Paris Congress of May 1945 and in February 1946 he returned to Spain clandestinely. He was elected Secretary of Defense of the National Committee of the CNT and the National Alliance of Democratic Forces (ANFD). But on 7 April 1946, he was arrested in a massive raid in which nearly 80 activists and the entire National Committee of the CNT were detained. He was brought before a war council in November 1947 and was sentenced to 15 years in prison. In 1952 he was released and settled in Toulouse, while staying out of active militancy. In 1960 after the reunification of the CNT, he was appointed to the Intercontinental Secretariat (SI) as delegate of the International Workers' Association. In 1976 he returned to Spain to collaborate in the reconstruction of the CNT.

Juan Manuel Molina Mateo died in Barcelona, on 20 September 1984.

== Works ==
- La insurrección anarquista del 8 de diciembre de 1934 (Barcelona, 1934, with Diego Abad de Santillán).
- Noche sobre España. Siete años en las prisiones de Franco (México, 1958).
- España libre (México, 1966).
- El movimiento clandestino en España 1939-1949 (México, 1976).
- El comunismo totalitario (México, 1982).

| Preceded by Mariano Vázquez | General Secretary of the CNT (in exile) 1943-1944; 1944-1945 | Succeeded by Germinal Esgleas |
