= General Secretary of the Confederación Nacional del Trabajo =

Head of the confederation of Spanish anarcho-syndicalist trade unions

- CNT emblem

- CNT flag
- Incumbent; Erika Conrado since 27 January 2024
- Type: General secretary
- Member of: Confederación Nacional del Trabajo
- Seat: Granollers
- Precursor: General Secretary of Solidaridad Obrera
- Formation: 1 November 1910
- First holder: Josep Negre

The General Secretary or Secretary General of the Confederación Nacional del Trabajo is the head of the Confederación Nacional del Trabajo (National Confederation of Labour; CNT), a Spanish confederation of anarcho-syndicalist trade unions. The position is elected by a congress or plenary session of the confederation. The position's powers are limited to technical and administrative affairs.

Since the confederation does not have fixed headquarters, the elected General Secretary's local federation becomes the confederation's central operations and a local plenary session of the local federation chooses the secretariats for other leadership positions. Together they are known as the Secretariado Permanente del Comité Confederal (Permanent Secretariat of the Confederal Committee, or SPCC). They, together with other regional federation's secretaries general, form the full Confederal Committee. The first general secretary of the CNT, chosen at its 1910 constitutional congress, was José Negre. He had been general secretary of Solidaridad Obrera, a Catalan union and precursor to the CNT. Thus Barcelona was the first headquarters.

The CNT operated clandestinely during years of repression and splintered. Sources support several timelines of CNT Secretaries General during this time.

== Through the Civil War (1910–1939) ==
Unless specified otherwise, the Headquarters of the CNT's General General and National Committee during this period were based in Barcelona.

No.	Portrait	Name (Birth–Death)	Term of office		Notes
1		Josep Negre (1875–1939)	November 1910	September 1911	
1		Josep Negre (1875–1939)	September 1911	1914	During this period, the CNT was banned by the government and organised clandestinely. Duties as general secretary alternated between Josep Negre, Francisco Jordán and Francisco Miranda.
2		Manuel Andreu (1889–1968)	November 1915	August 1916	Legal restrictions against the CNT were lifted and it resumed public activity in 1915.
3		Francisco Jordán (1886–1921)	August 1916	February 1917 ‡	
4		Francisco Miranda (1869–1950)	March 1917	August 1917 ‡	
–		Manuel Buenacasa (1886–1964)	August 1917	November 1917	Interim General Secretary, while Francisco Miranda was imprisoned.
(4)		Francisco Miranda (1869–1950)	December 1917	July 1918	
5		Manuel Buenacasa (1886–1964)	August 1918	December 1918	
6		Evelio Boal (1884–1921)	January 1919	December 1919	As Provisional General Secretary.
6		Evelio Boal (1884–1921)	December 1919	March 1921 ‡	Murdered on 12 June 1921.
7		Andreu Nin (1892–1937)	March 1921	May 1921	
8		Joaquim Maurín (1896–1950)	August 1921	February 1922 ‡	
9		Joan Peiró (1887–1942)	May 1922	June 1922	
10		Salvador Seguí (1887–1923)	11 June 1922	10 March 1923 †	Assassinated by pistoleros.
11		Manuel Adame (1901–1945)	July 1923	16 August 1923 ‡	
12		Paulino Díez (1892–1980)	August 1923	25 December 1923 ‡	Headquartered in Seville.
13		José Gracia Galán	April 1924	2 June 1924 ‡	Headquartered in Zaragoza.
–		Unknown	June 1924	September 1925	During this period, the CNT was outlawed by the Dictatorship of Primo de Rivera and carried out its activities clandestinely. The identity of the general secretary at this time is unknown.
14		Avelino González (1894–1938)	September 1925	June 1926	Headquartered in Gijón.
15		Segundo Blanco (1899–1957)	July 1926	November 1926	Headquartered in Gijón.
16 (9)		Joan Peiró (1887–1942)	January 1927	May 1929	
17		Ángel Pestaña (1886–1937)	June 1929	June 1930	
18		Progreso Alfarache (1888–1964)	27 June 1930	27 September 1930 ‡	
19		Francesc Arín	October 1930	December 1930	Serving as Interim General Secretary.
19		Francesc Arín	December 1930	December 1931	The Second Spanish Republic was established during this period.
20 (17)		Ángel Pestaña (1886–1937)	December 1931	March 1932	
21		Manuel Rivas	March 1932	January 1933 ‡	Imprisoned following the anarchist insurrection of January 1933.
22		Miguel Yoldi (1903–1961)	December 1933	February 1935	Headquartered in Zaragoza.
23		Horacio Prieto (1902–1985)	March 1935	May 1936	Headquartered in Zaragoza. Provisionally replaced at the outbreak of the Spanish Civil War.
–		David Antona (1904–1945)	18 July 1936	September 1936	Provisional General Secretary during the early months of the Spanish Civil War.
(23)		Horacio Prieto (1902–1985)	September 1936	18 November 1936	Re-election confirmed by national plenum on 4 August 1936.
24		Mariano Vázquez (1909–1939)	18 November 1936	February 1939	Headquarters transferred from Barcelona, to Madrid and then Valencia. Term ended by the conclusion of the Catalonia Offensive. Died in Paris in June 1939.

== During Franco (1939–1976) ==
During this period, the CNT worked clandestinely both inside Spain and in French exile. A schism among the exiles created two confederal committees with their own corresponding secretaries general.

=== In Spain ===
Name	Took office	Left office
Esteve Pallarols	April 1939	November 1939
Manuel López López	January 1940	July 1940
Celedonio Pérez Bernardo	July 1940	February 1941
Eusebio Azañedo Grande	December 1942	August 1943
Manuel Amil Barciá	September 1943	September 1944
Siegfried Catalá Tineo	September 1944	March 1945
Ramón Rufat Llop	April 1945	July 1945
José Expósito Leiva	July 1945	October 1945
Ángel Morales Vázquez	November 1945	March 1946
Lorenzo Íñigo Granizo	March 1946	April 1946
Enrique Marco Nadal	May 1946	April 1947
Antonio Ejarque Pina	May 1947	August 1947
Manuel Villar Mingo	August 1947	November 1947
Antonio Castaño Benavent	April 1948	July 1949
Miguel Vallejo Sebastián	July 1949	June 1951
Cipriano Damiano	June 1951	June 1953
Ismael Rodríguez Ajax	October 1960	October 1961
Francisco Calle Mancilla	April 1962	February 1964
Cipriano Damiano	April 1964	April 1965
Francisco Royano Fernández	May 1965	September 1968

=== In exile ===
Name	Election date	Agency	Town
Mariano Rodríguez Vázquez ^{1}	25 February 1939	General Council of the MLE	Paris
José Germán González	June 1943	National Plenary (confederal)	Mauriac
Juan Manuel Molina Mateo	September 1943	National Plenary (confederal)	Tourniac
Francisco Careño	March 1944	National Plenary (confederal)	Muret
Juan Manuel Molina Mateo	October 1944	National Plenary (confederal)	Toulouse
Germinal Esgleas Jaume	May 1945	Paris Congress	Paris

1. After his death, Germinal Esgleas Jaume took over.

==== Orthodox faction ====
Name	Election date	Agency	Town
Germinal Esgleas Jaume	-	-	-
Germinal Esgleas Jaume	August 1946	Toulouse	
Josep Peirats	October 1947	Congress of Local Federations	Toulouse
Pedro Herrera Camarero	April 1947	I Intercontinental Conference	-
Emilio Julio González	October 1948 ^{1}	Congress of Local Federations	-
Luis Blanco	February 1949	II Intercontinental Conference	Toulouse
Josep Peirats	May 1950	I National Plenary (confederal)	Toulouse
Martín Villarupia	April 1951	II Intercontinental Plenary	Toulouse
Germinal Esgleas Jaume	July 1952	III Intercontinental Plenary	Aymare
Germinal Esgleas Jaume	July 1953	IV Intercontinental Plenary Session	Toulouse
Germinal Esgleas Jaume	August 1954	5th Intercontinental Plenary	Toulouse
Germinal Esgleas Jaume	August 1955	VI Intercontinental Plenary Session	Toulouse
Germinal Esgleas Jaume	July 1956	VII Intercontinental Plenary Session	Toulouse
Germinal Esgleas Jaume	August 1957	VIII Intercontinental Plenary Session	Toulouse
Roque Santamaría Cortiguera	August 1958	IX Intercontinental Plenary	Toulouse
Roque Santamaría Cortiguera	September 1959	X Intercontinental Plenary	Vierzon
Roque Santamaría Cortiguera	August 1960	Congress of Local Federations	Limoges

1.He resigned in December 1948.

==== Possibilist faction ====
Name	Election date	Agency	Town
Ramón Álvarez Palomo	November 1945	Plenary of Regionals of Origin	Toulouse
Ramón Álvarez Palomo	August 1946	Plenary	Toulouse
José Juan Domenech	December 1947	I National Plenary (confederal) of Regionals	Toulouse
José Juan Domenech	May 1948	Plenary	-
José Juan Domenech	February 1949	II National Plenary (confederal)	-
Helios Sánchez	June 1950	III National Plenary (confederal)	-
Miguel Vallejo Sebastián	June 1952	IV National Plenary (confederal)	-
Miguel Vallejo Sebastián	March 1954	V National Plenary (confederal)	-
Ramón Liarte	November 1955	VI National Plenary (confederal)	-
Ginés Alonso	August 1957	VII National Plenary (confederal)	-
Ginés Alonso	October 1958	VIII National Plenary (confederal)	-
Ginés Alonso	March 1960	IX National Plenary (confederal)	Clermont Ferrand

==== Reunification of exiled factions ====
The reunification of the CNT was ratified by a congress in Caracas, Venezuela, on 18 December 1960.

Name	Election date	Agency	Town
Roque Santamaría Cortiguera	August 1961	Congress of Local Federations	Limoges
Roque Santamaría Cortiguera	August 1962	Intercontinental Plenary	Toulouse
Germinal Esgleas Jaume	October 1963	Congress of Local Federations	Toulouse
Germinal Esgleas Jaume	August 1965	Congress of Local Federations	Montpellier
Ferran Alemany	August 1967	Intercontinental Plenary	Marseille
Germinal Esgleas Jaume	August 1969	Intercontinental Plenary	Bordeaux
Germinal Esgleas Jaume	August 1971	Intercontinental Plenary Session	Marseille
Marciano Sigüenza ^{1}	August 1973	Intercontinental Plenary Session	Marseille
Alejandro Lamela	August 1975	Congress of Local Federations	Marseille

1. He resigned in January 1975.

== Since the transition to democracy (1976–present) ==
Name	Took office	Left office	Headquarters
Juan Gómez Casas	August 1976	April 1978	Madrid
Enric Marco	April 1978	December 1979	Barcelona
José Bondía	December 1979	January 1983	Madrid
Antonio Pérez Canales	January 1983	-	-
Fernando Montero	July 1983	-	-
Juan Gómez Casas	1985	-	-
José Luis García Rúa	March of 1986	1990	Granada
Vicente Vilanova	1990	-	Valencia
José Ros	November 1992	-	Barcelona
Luis Fernando Barba	May 1995	December 1995	Granada
José Luis Velasco Sanz	December 1995	February 1998	Madrid
Luis Fuentes	December 1998	October 2000	Bilbao
Ana Sigüenza	October 2000	March 2003	Madrid
Iñaki Gil	April 2003	July 2005	Vitoria-Gasteiz
Rafael Corrales Valverde	July 2005	August 2007	Seville
Fidel Manrique	August 2007	December 2010	Torrelavega
Alfonso Álvarez	December 2010	April 2013	Córdoba
Pedro Serna	April 2013	April 2015	Valladolid
Martín Paradelo	April 2015	July 2017	Santiago de Compostela
Enrique Hoz	July 2017	2019	Bilbao
Miguel García Romero	2019	November 2021	Lebrija
Isabel Arenales	November 2021	December 2021	Valladolid
Antonio Díaz García	December 2021	January 2024	Madrid
Erika Conrado	January 2024	present	Granollers

== Bibliography ==
- Ackelsberg, Martha A. (1985). ""Separate and Equal"? Mujeres Libres and Anarchist Strategy for Women's Emancipation". Feminist Studies. 11 (1): 63–83. doi:10.2307/3180133. hdl:2027/spo.0499697.0011.106. JSTOR 3180133.
- Andrews, Nathaniel (2021). Anarchism in Everyday Life (PDF) (PhD). University of Leeds.
- Balcells, Albert (2017). "Collectivisations in Catalonia and the Region of Valencia during the Spanish Civil War, 1936-1939" (PDF). Catalan Historical Review (10): 77–92. doi:10.2436/20.1000.01.133. ISSN 2013-407X.
- Bolloten, Burnet (1991). The Spanish Civil War: Revolution and Counterrevolution. University of North Carolina Press. ISBN 0-8078-1906-9. LCCN 89-77911.
- Brodie, Morris (2020a). Transatlantic Anarchism during the Spanish Civil War and Revolution, 1936-1939: Fury Over Spain. Routledge. doi:10.4324/9780429328763. ISBN 9780429328763.
- Casado Gil, María Reyes (2016). La Confederación Nacional del Trabajo en el Estado español: reorganización y crisis (1973-1980) (PhD) (in Spanish). National University of Distance Education.
- Casanova, Julián (2005a). "Terror and violence: The dark face of Spanish anarchism". International Labor and Working-Class History. 67: 79–99. doi:10.1017/S0147547905000098.
- Casanova, Julián (2005b). "On the road to insurrection". In Preston, Paul (ed.). Anarchism, the Republic and Civil War in Spain: 1931–1939. Translated by Dowling, Andrew; Pollok, Graham. Routledge. pp. 64–83. ISBN 0-415-32095-X.
- Christie, Stuart (2000). We, the Anarchists! A Study of the Iberian Anarchist Federation (FAI) 1927-1937. Hastings: Meltzer Press. ISBN 1901172066. OCLC 803517498.
- Dunwoodie, Peter (1993). "Albert Camus and the Anarchist Alternative". Australian Journal of French Studies. 30 (1): 84–104. doi:10.3828/ajfs.30.1.84.
- Ealham, Chris (2014). "Spanish Anarcho-Syndicalists in Toulouse: The Red-and-Black Counter-City in Exile". Bulletin of Spanish Studies. 91 (1–2): 95–114. doi:10.1080/14753820.2013.868652.
- Esenwein, George (2023). "Spain in Revolt: The Revolutionary Legacy of Anarchism and Anarcho-Syndicalism". In van der Linden, Marcel (ed.). The Cambridge History of Socialism. Vol. 1. Cambridge University Press. pp. 380–410. doi:10.1017/9781108611022.017. ISBN 978-1-108-48134-2.
- Evans, Daniel (2016). The Conscience of the Spanish Revolution: Anarchist Opposition to State Collaboration in 1937 (PhD). University of Leeds.
- Evans, Danny (2019). "Uprooted cosmopolitans? The post-war exile of Spanish anarchists in Venezuela, 1945-1965". Journal of Iberian and Latin American Studies. 25 (2): 321–342. doi:10.1080/14701847.2019.1632037.
- Gómez Casas, Juan [in Spanish] (1986). Anarchist Organisation: the History of the F.A.I. Translated by Bluestein, Abe. Black Rose Books. ISBN 0-920057-40-3.
- Íñiguez, Miguel (2001). Esbozo de una enciclopedia histórica del anarquismo español (in Spanish). Madrid: Fundación de Estudios Libertarios Anselmo Lorenzo. ISBN 9788486864453. OCLC 807322760.
- Muñoz Encinar, Laura; Palomo Guijarro, Gonzalo; Recio Cuesta, José Antonio (2010). "Comunismo libertario y autonomía indígena" [Libertarian communism and indigenous autonomy]. Historia Actual Online (in Spanish) (21): 111–121. ISSN 1696-2060.
- Paz, Abel (2006) [1996]. Durruti in the Spanish Revolution. Translated by Morse, Chuck. Edinburgh: AK Press. ISBN 1-904859-50-X. LCCN 2006920974. OCLC 482919277.
