= Salvador Seguí =

Catalan anarchist (1887–1923)

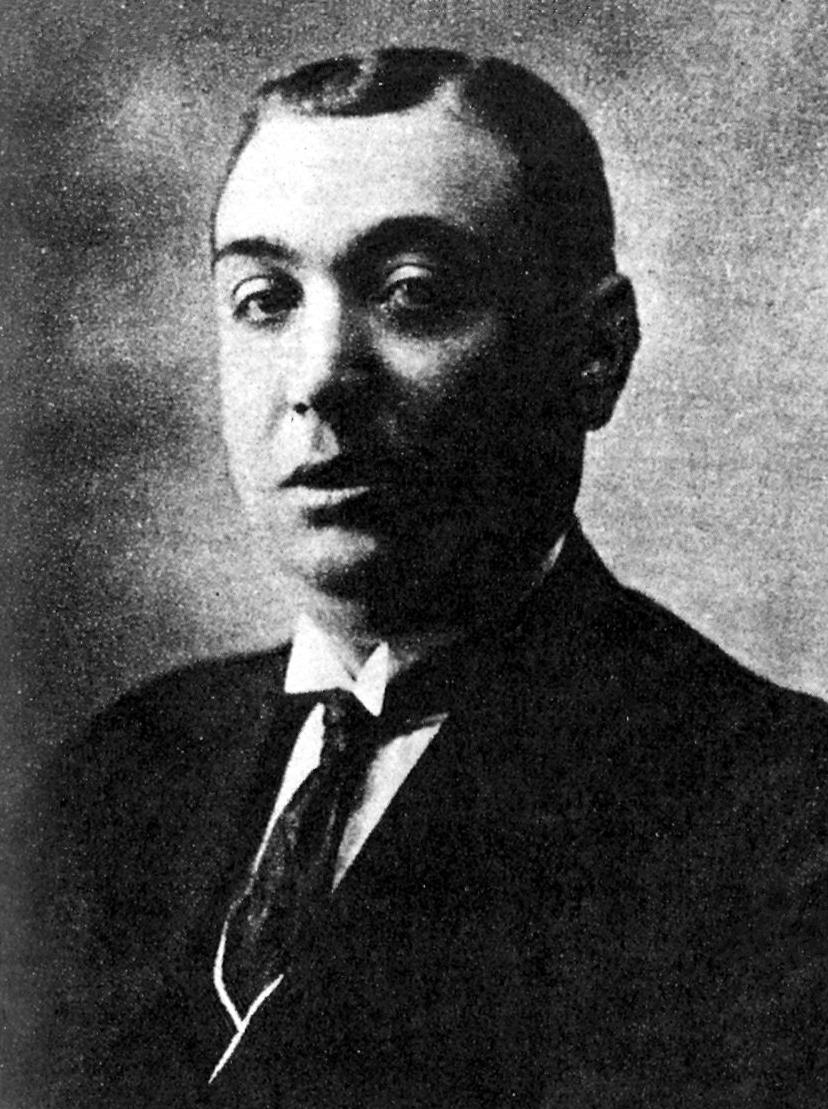

General Secretary of the Confederación Nacional del Trabajo
- In office December 1922 – 10 March 1923
- Preceded by: Joan Peiró
- Succeeded by: Manuel Adame

Personal details
- Born: Salvador Seguí i Rubinat; 23 September 1887 Lleida, Spain
- Died: 10 March 1923 (aged 35) Barcelona, Catalonia, Spain
- Cause of death: Extrajudicial killing
- Resting place: Montjuïc Cemetery
- Party: Confederación Nacional del Trabajo
- Spouse: Teresa Muntaner

Salvador Seguí i Rubinat (23 September 1887, in Lleida – 10 March 1923, in Barcelona), known as El noi del sucre ("the boy of the sugar" in Catalan) for his habit of eating the sugar cubes served him with his coffee, was a Catalan anarcho-syndicalist in the Confederación Nacional del Trabajo (CNT), a Spanish confederation of anarcho-syndicalist labor unions.

== Biography ==
He is mainly remembered for playing a major role in building and organizing the workers' movement in Catalonia. He became General Secretary of the CNT in Catalonia in 1918.

While he was General Secretary in Catalonia, the CNT played a major role in the ''La Canadenca'' strike, which lasted for 44 days, which paralyzed 70% of the Catalan economy, and which led to Spain being the first country in the world to establish the 8-hour working day by law. During the strike, Seguí was imprisoned, but was liberated on the last day of the strike, just in time to attend the general assembly attended by 20.000 workers which ended the strike. He was the person who communicated all the achievements.

Together with Ángel Pestaña, Seguí opposed the paramilitary actions advocated and carried out by other members of the CNT. On 10 March 1923, while completing preparations to promote the idea of emancipation as a form of social empowerment among workers, he was assassinated by gunshot on Carrer de la Cadena, in Barcelona's Raval District, at the hands of gunmen working for the Catalan employers' organisation under protection of Catalonia's Civil Governor, Martínez Anido. At this same shooting, another anarcho-syndicalist, Francesc Comes, known as Perones, was wounded and was to die several days later. He was buried in the Cemetery of Montjuïc, Barcelona.

He has received many tributes since his death, and a foundation has been launched in his memory, the Fundación Salvador Seguí, based in Barcelona, Madrid and Valencia. In 2023, during the centennial anniversary of his assassination, many commemorative events were organized. Several expositions were held throughout the territory. In addition, a commemoration was held by the Fundación Salvador Seguí, the CNT, the GGT, Solidaridad Obrera, and the Fundación Anselmo Lorenzo. A square in El Raval neighborhood of Barcelona is named after him.

== Bibliography ==
- Seguí, Salvador «Noi del Sucre». Escuela de Rebeldía (Historia de un sindicalista), Ilustraciones de M. Ramos, Madrid, La Novela de Hoy (Sucesores de Rivadeneyra), 1923.
- Seguí, Salvador. Narraciones. anarco-sindicalistas de los años veinte / Salvador Seguí...[et al.], Barcelona, Icaria, 1978.
- Martí Font, Jordi (2021). ''Salvador Seguí. El colós de l'anarquisme''. Lo Diable Gros.

== See also ==
- La Canadenca strike
- Pistolerismo
