= Ramón Álvarez Palomo =

Spanish trade unionist (1913–2003)

Minister of Fisheries
- In office 1936–1937
- President: Belarmino Tomás
- Constituency: Asturias and León

Personal details
- Born: 7 March 1913 Gijón, Asturias, Kingdom of Spain
- Died: 13 November 2003 (aged 90)
- Citizenship: Spain
- Party: CNT-FAI (1928-1989), CGT (1989-2003)
- Spouse: Carmen Cadavieco
- Profession: Baker

Ramón Álvarez Palomo (7 March 1913 – 14 November 2003) was an Asturian anarcho-syndicalist and one of the key figures in the Revolution of 1934 and the establishment of the General Confederation of Labor (Spanish: Confederación General del Trabajo, CGT).

== Biography ==
Ramón Álvarez Palomo was born in Gijón, on 7 March 1913, he had five brothers and his father was a member of the National Confederation of Labor (Spanish: Confederación Nacional del Trabajo, CNT). He began working as a baker at the age of 12, after being educated at the rationalist school of Eleuterio Quintanilla. In 1928 he joined the CNT himself, where he met Segundo Blanco and Avelino González Mallada. At the age of twenty, he was elected secretary of the Gijón bakers section and, in July 1933, also general secretary of the CNT of Asturias, León and Palencia.

=== Revolution ===
He was one of the Asturian leaders of the anarchist insurrection of January 1933 and was locked up in jail, where he met Buenaventura Durruti, Cipriano Mera and Isaac Puente. After receiving amnesty from Alejandro Lerroux in April 1934, he actively participated in the Asturian Revolution, becoming secretary of the Gijón Revolutionary Committee (Asturian: Comité Revolucionariu de Xixón, CRX). When the revolt was crushed, he fled through the mountains until in March 1935 he managed to reach France, where he remained until he was granted amnesty after the victory of the Popular Front in the 1936 general election.

When the coup d'état took place on 18 July 1936, he became a member of the Gijón War Committee, and later a fisheries councilor and representative of the Iberian Anarchist Federation (Spanish: Federación Anarquista Ibérica, FAI) in the Sovereign Council of Asturias and León. After the fall of Asturias into the hands of the nationalist forces in 1937, he fled to Catalunya, where he acted as secretary of Segundo Blanco, the Minister of Education in the first Negrín government.

=== Exile ===
At the end of the civil war he fled to France and settled in Paris, where his first wife, Carmen Cadavieco, died shortly after. When the Wehrmacht troops occupied Paris in 1940 he fled to Orleans and from there to Chartres, where in 1942 he managed to gather around 500 exiled CNT militants and maintained contact with the French Resistance.

In 1945 he participated in the CNT Congress in Toulouse, where he restructured the Regional Committee of Asturias in exile. He also led the possibilist section (in favor of collaborating with the governments of the Spanish Republican government in exile) to split from the impossibilist sector headed by Germinal Esgleas Jaume and Federica Montseny. Finally the split was consummated and he became Secretary General of the possibilist CNT, until the 1st Regional Plenary held in Toulouse in December 1947. In 1949 he moved back to Paris.

At the end of the 1960s, together with UGT leaders, he founded the Unified Workers' Solidarity Fund to help imprisoned or fired workers.

=== Return to Asturias ===
He returned to Asturias for the first time in 1972 and, definitively, in 1976. Once returned, he participated in the different congresses of the CNT and in 1978 he was elected regional secretary for Asturias, also directing the magazine Acción Libertaria until 1994.

During the 5th congress of the union he defended the participation of the CNT in collective bargaining and union elections in works councils, opposing national leaders such as José Luis García Rúa. These discrepancies led him to break with the CNT and approach the General Confederation of Labor (Spanish: Confederación General del Trabajo, CGT), of which he was one of the founders in 1989.

== Works ==
- Eleuterio Quintanilla (vida y obra del maestro) (1973)
- Avelino González Mallada, alcalde anarquista (1986)
- José María Martínez. Símbolo ejemplar del obrerismo militante (1990)
- Historia negra de una crisis libertaria (1982)
- Rebelión militar y revolución en Asturias. Un protagonista libertario. (1995)

== Bibliography ==
- Conti, Carlo (2002). "Biografía de un sindicalista cenetista: Ramón Álvarez Palomo". Homenaje a Ramón Álvarez Palomo. Cuadernos de Historia, nº3: La CNT en la historia española del siglo xx. Oviedo: Facultad de Geografía e Historia. pp. 9–28.

Preceded by Germinal Esgleas Jaume	General Secretary of the CNT (Possibilists) 1945-1947	Succeeded by Josep Juan i Domènech
