= Ana Sigüenza =

Spanish teacher and trade unionist (born 1957)

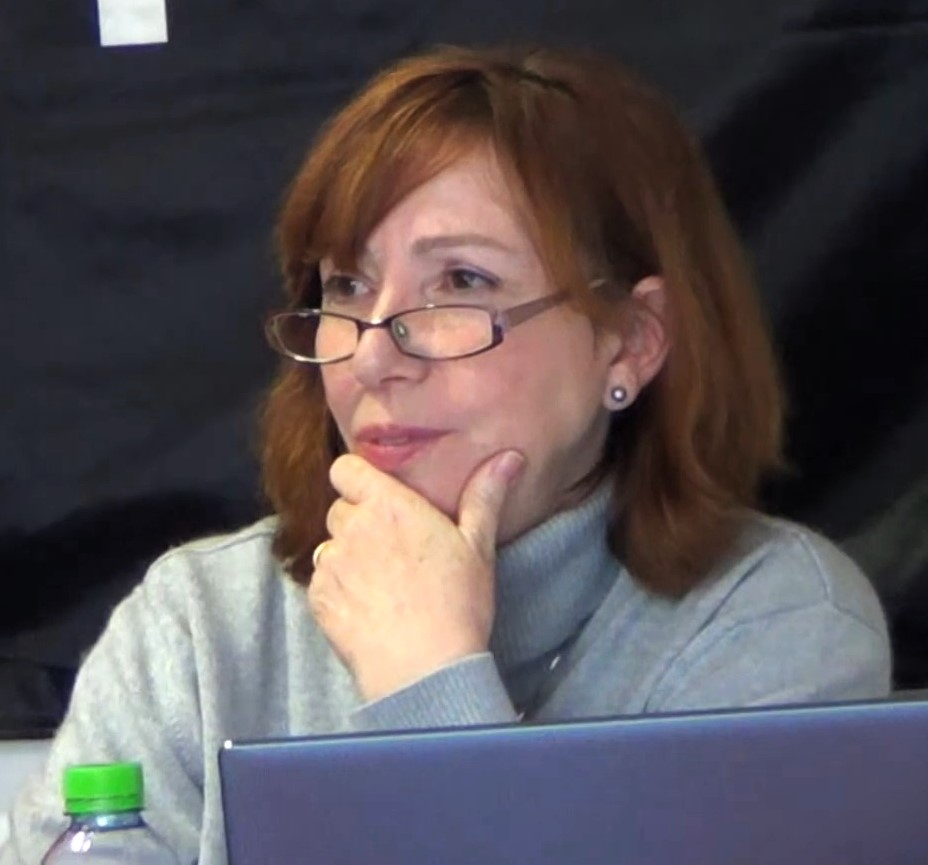
- Sigüenza in 2014

General Secretary of the Confederación Nacional del Trabajo
- In office October 2000 – March 2003
- Preceded by: Luis Fuentes
- Succeeded by: Iñaki Gil

Personal details
- Born: Ana María Sigüenza Carbonell c. 1957 (age 68–69)
- Profession: Teacher

Ana María Sigüenza Carbonell (born c. 1957) is a Spanish teacher and anarcho-syndicalist trade union leader. She served as the General Secretary of the Confederación Nacional del Trabajo (CNT) from 2000 to 2003, making her the first woman to be general secretary of a national trade union centre in Spain.

== Biography ==
Sigüenza joined the CNT in 1977 and initially worked in the chemical industry before switching to being a teacher. She worked as a secondary school teacher in Madrid, before retiring around 2018. During the Spanish transition to democracy, as the Spanish labour movement debated participation in union elections for works councils, she sided with the opposition. Sigüenza believed that participation in works councils would be "the end of Spanish trade unionism", a position she continued to hold over 40 years later.

From October 2000 to March 2003, Sigüenza served as the General Secretary of the CNT. She has been credited as the first woman to hold the position of general secretary of a national trade union centre in Spain. As general secretary, she oversaw the organisation of self-employed workers and workers in small and medium-sized enterprises; she criticised major trade unions such as the UGT and CCOO for having what she called an outdated model of industrial organisation, which focused on older men at the expense of younger people and women. She also oversaw an increase in participation in social movements, supporting anti-eviction campaigns and leading the 2018 Spanish women's strike. She has also worked with the International Confederation of Labour (ICL), which split from the International Workers' Association (IWA) in 2016. In the case of "the Suiza Six", six Asturian CNT members who had been sentenced to seven years' imprisonment on charges of coercion and obstruction of justice, Sigüenza supported their defense campaign and appeal to the Supreme Court, believing there was "no legal basis" for their prosecution.

In the 2010s, Sigüenza began researching progressive education and developing a libertarian theory of pedagogy. Her pedagogical ideas were explicitly utopian, as she wrote that "from a pedagogical point of view, utopia is necessary because no project should be considered finished, nor should it be considered absolutely perfect; it is a never-ending process that people and future generations will continue to build or create in order to better respond to their needs and life circumstances." In 2018, Sigüenza published a book on libertarian pedagogy, in which she outlined that anarchist educational methods should neither claim neutrality nor practice indoctrination. She proposed that, while the roles of teacher and student constituted a form of "admissible authority", the two roles ought to be temporary and open to alternation.

== Selected works ==
As author

- Taller de música y danza en la escuela, co-authored with Agustina Hernández Martín (1986) OCLC 1354426768
- Era que no era, co-authored with Nacho Moliné (2000) OCLC 807771599
- Pedagogia Libertária (2018) ISBN 9788409054336; OCLC 1079399355

As contributor

- La prensa en la escuela by M.J. Casas Ruiz-Medrano (1991) OCLC 1354429561
- Talleres de centro by F. Jiménez Jiménez (1991) OCLC 1354429799

== See also ==
- Anarchism in Spain
- Federica Montseny – Anarcho-syndicalist who was the first woman to be a cabinet minister in Spanish history

== Bibliography ==
- Campo, Pilar (24 June 2024). ""Hacer sindicalismo no es delito", la consigna a las puertas del TS durante la revisión de la condena a 'Las 6 de La Suiza'" ["Trade unionism is not a crime", the slogan at the doors of the SC during the review of the conviction of “Las 6 de La Suiza”]. elDiario.es (in Spanish). ISSN 2255-3932.
- Mogollón Castro, Yesica Jissel; Rivera Ayala, Marlon Antonio (2021). "Nos - Otros y lo Rural" Aportes a las identidades de los estudiantes de tercero, cuarto y quinto de primaria de la Escuela Rural El Hato, Usme, desde la Investigación-Acción-Aprendizaje ["Nos - Otros y lo Rural" Contributions to the identities of third, fourth and fifth year primary school students at the El Hato Rural School, Usme, from Research-Action-Learning] (Thesis) (in Spanish). Francisco José de Caldas District University.
- Muñoz Encinar, Laura; Palomo Guijarro, Gonzalo; Recio Cuesta, José Antonio (2010). "Comunismo libertario y autonomía indígena" [Libertarian communism and indigenous autonomy]. Historia Actual Online (in Spanish) (21): 111–121. ISSN 1696-2060.
- Pascual, Alfredo (26 March 2018). "Del 8M a Amazon: CNT y CGT resucitan a costa de los dinosaurios sindicales" [From 8M to Amazon: The CNT and CGT resuscitate at the expense of the union dinosaurs]. El Confidencial. ISSN 2695-8848.
- Poncieu (8 August 2024). "A Associação de Trabalhadores de Base entrevista Ana Sigüenza da Confederação Nacional do Trabalho (CNT) da Espanha sobre a Confederação Internacional do Trabalho (CIT)" [The Association of Grassroots Workers interviews Ana Sigüenza from Spain's National Confederation of Labour (CNT) about the International Confederation of Labour (ICL)]. Instituto de Estudos Libertários (in Brazilian Portuguese).
- Ruiz Pina, Iñaki (2021). La relevancia de la cultura y la educación en el anarquismo español: 1868-1936 [The relevance of culture and education in Spanish anarchism: 1868–1936] (Thesis) (in Spanish). University of Zaragoza.
- Vadillo Muñoz, Julián (2019). "De la larga noche de la dictadura franquista a la transición democrática" [From the long night of Franco's dictatorship to the transition to democracy]. Historia de la CNT: utopía, pragmatismo y revolución [History of the CNT: Utopia, Pragmatism and Revolution] (in Spanish). Los Libros de la Catarata. ISBN 978-84-9097-567-1.
