= José Bondía =

Spanish trade unionist

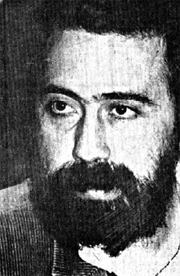
- Bondía, c. 1979

General Secretary of the Confederación Nacional del Trabajo
- In office 15 December 1979 – January 1983
- Preceded by: Enric Marco
- Succeeded by: Antonio Pérez Canales

Personal details
- Born: José Bondía Román Salamanca, Spain

José Bondía Román (fl. 1976-1989) is a Spanish trade unionist who led the National Confederation of Labour (CNT) as its General Secretary from 1979 to 1983. A leading advocate of participation in union elections to works councils, he led a faction of the CNT that formed part of the General Confederation of Labour (CGT).

== Biography ==
José Bondía Román was born in Salamanca during the 20th century. He later moved to Madrid, where he worked for IBM. By the 1970s, he had become involved in the National Confederation of Labour (CNT), an anarcho-syndicalist trade union centre, as well as the Madrid section of the Iberian Anarchist Federation (FAI). During the Spanish transition to democracy, at a national plenary of the CNT, held in Madrid in July 1976, Bondía was elected as the organisation's press secretary, serving under general secretary Juan Gómez Casas.

At the CNT's 5th Congress, held in Madrid in December 1979, internal divisions over the issue of participation in union elections to works councils came to a head. On the final day of the congress, Bondía was elected as the general secretary of the CNT; the Congress had ended with a marathon 24-hour session, closing at 03:00 with only 60 union delegates still in attendance. 90 delegates walked out of the congress and held a separate congress in Valencia, constituting the CNT-CV. According to Bondía, Federica Montseny herself left the 1979 congress in tears, distraught at the collapse of the organisation to internal divisions. In statements made after the congress, Bondía informed the press that the CNT remained committed to social revolution and the establishment of libertarian communism; the congress had resolved not to sign the Moncloa Pacts.

As general secretary, Bondía called for the CNT to "boycott production", but the organisation did not have the organisational strength to carry out such a campaign. Over time, Bondía began to move towards support for participation in union elections. He believed that the CNT ought to be able to alternate between reformist and revolutionary positions, depending on the material conditions it was presented with. During the last months of his tenure as general secretary, Bondía increasingly exercised executive power and made decisions without consulting the rank-and-file membership, which combined with his favourability towards union elections, caused tensions within the organisation.

After the CNT's 6th Congress, held in Barcelona in January 1983, the "renovationist" delegates led by Bondía won out; Antonio Pérez Canales was elected to succeed Bondía as general secretary. But the issue of participation in union elections was not resolved, so in April 1983, an extraordinary congress was held in Torrejón de Ardoz, where the CNT's opposition to electoral participation was confirmed. Bondía resigned from the CNT in protest and led a splinter group into a Reunification Congress with the CNT-CV. They formed the CNT-Renovada, which in 1989, was compelled by a court order to change its name; this organisation then became known as the General Confederation of Labour (CGT). Bondía and other "renovators" were consequently denounced by Juan Gómez Casas, who called them Pestañistas, in reference to the Treintist leader Ángel Pestaña.

== Bibliography ==
- Ballester Cuñat, Laura (2015). Federica Montseny, la indomable (BA) (in Spanish). Universitat Jaume I.
- Casado Gil, Maria Reyes (2002). Navajas Zubeldia, Carlos (ed.). La CNT en la prensa española (1976-1979) (PDF). Actas del III Simposio de Historia Actual (in Spanish). Logroño: Gobierno de La Rioja. pp. 517–530. ISBN 9788495747204. OCLC 52773853.
- Casado Gil, Maria Reyes (2015). "El V Congreso de la CNT (8-16 de diciembre de 1979)". Espacio, Tiempo y Forma (in Spanish). 5 (27): 279–295. doi:10.5944/etfv.27.2015.14481. ISSN 1130-0124.
- González Pérez, Héctor Augusto (2013). La escisión de la CNT en Asturias y la construcción de la memoria colectiva (MA) (in Spanish). University of Oviedo.
- Rivera Blanco, Antonio (1999). "Demasiado tarde (El anarcosindicalismo en la transición española". Historia contemporánea (in Spanish) (19): 329–353. ISSN 1130-2402. OCLC 1364708467.
- Roca Martínez, Beltrán (2014). "Izquierda radical, sindicalismo y acción colectiva en Andalucía (1976–2012)". Cuadernos de Relaciones Laborales (in Spanish). 32 (2): 439–468. doi:10.5209/rev_CRLA.2014.v32.n2.46772. ISSN 1131-8635. S2CID 144776072.
- Torres, Maggie (2019). Anarchism and Political Change in Spain: Schism, Polarisation and Reconstruction of the Confederación Nacional del Trabajo, 1939-1979. Sussex Academic Press. ISBN 9781845199364.
- Vadillo Muñoz, Julián (2004). El anarquismo y anarcosindicalismo en la España de la Transición. La transición a la democracia en España: actas de las VI Jornadas de Castilla-La Mancha sobre Investigación en archivos (in Spanish). Asociación de Amigos del Archivo Histórico Provincial de Castilla La Mancha. ISBN 9788493165888. OCLC 1025295575.
