= Joan Peiró =

Catalan anarchist (1887–1942)

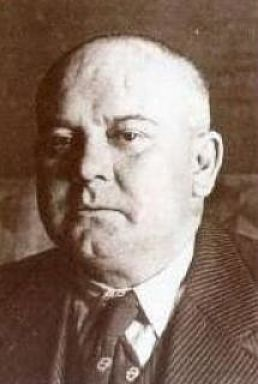

Minister of Industry
- In office 4 November 1936 – 17 May 1937
- Preceded by: Anastasio de Gracia

General Secretary of the Confederación Nacional del Trabajo
- In office January 1927 – May 1929
- Preceded by: Segundo Blanco
- Succeeded by: Ángel Pestaña
- In office May 1922 – December 1922
- Preceded by: Joaquim Maurín
- Succeeded by: Salvador Seguí

Personal details
- Born: Joan Peiró Belis; 18 February 1887 Barcelona, Spain
- Died: 24 July 1942 (aged 55) Paterna, Valencia, Spain
- Cause of death: Execution
- Resting place: Mataró, Barcelona, Spain
- Citizenship: Spanish
- Party: Confederación Nacional del Trabajo
- Spouse: Mercè Olives
- Children: Aurora, Aurèlia, Guillermina, Mercè, Joan, Josep y Liberto Peiró
- Occupation: Syndicalist, Politician

Joan Peiró i Belis (sometimes Juan Peiró: 18 February 1887 – 24 July 1942) was a Catalan anarchist activist, writer, editor of the anarchist newspaper Solidaridad Obrera, two-time General Secretary of the Confederación Nacional del Trabajo (National Confederation of Labour, CNT) and Minister of Industry of the Spanish government during the Spanish Civil War.

== Life ==
Though he was born in the Sants neighbourhood of Barcelona, Peiró spent a large portion of his life in Mataró, just outside Barcelona, where he worked as a glass worker all his life in the cooperative glass factory Cristalleries de Mataró .

Contrary to most anarchists' principles, in 1930, during the reign of Alfonso XIII of Spain, Peiró signed the "Manifesto of the Catalan Intelligentsia", which called for the establishment of a republic. A short time later, Peiró was stripped of his position of speaking for the CNT at a rally in Barcelona, but Peiró announced that he had removed his signature from the manifesto, and held his faith in anarcho-syndicalism. Later, in 1931, Peiró signed Ángel Pestaña's Manifiesto de los Treinta ("Manifesto of the Thirty"), which was critical of the more radical Federación Anarquista Ibérica influence on the CNT, which would have him temporarily removed from the CNT.

On 4 November 1936 Peiró, and three other members of the CNT leadership, were appointed to ministerial positions in the Spanish government by Largo Caballero. In 1937, he drafted a piece of legislation that would have collectivized all of Spain's industries, but after several redrafts, the final legislation provided virtually nothing of the original intent. Peiró was removed from his position on 17 May 1937 but returned to the government under Juan Negrín as Commissioner of Electricity.

Following the fall of the republic in 1939, Peiró fled to France, where he was turned over to Nazi Germany by the Vichy Regime in France. He was executed after the Gestapo turned him over to the Franco government in Spain.

== Legacy ==
In Barcelona, a plaza adjacent to the main transportation terminal was named for Peiró.

In 2002, on the 60th anniversary of Peiró's death, a group in Mataró organized a celebration in honor of Peiró. The celebration took place at the cemetery in Mataró where Peiró's body lies, and was attended by his daughter Guillermina Peiró, the secretary of communication of the Confederación General del Trabajo (General Confederation of Labour, CGT), Jordí Martí, as well as the Mayor of Mataró, Manuel Mas. A red and black flag was laid on Peiró's tomb, while the anthem of the CNT, To the Barricades was sung.

Peiró's son Josep, like his father, went on to be a leader of the CNT in exile, after having fought in the Civil War as part of the Ascaso Column.

== Written works ==
- Trayectoria de la Confederación Nacional del Trabajo.
- Ideas sobre Sindicalismo y Anarquismo.
- Perill a la reraguarda.
- Problemas y cintarazos.
- Problemas del sindicalismo y del Anarquismo.

== See also ==
- Anarchism in Spain

== Sources ==
- Beevor, Antony (2006). The Battle for Spain: The Spanish Civil War 1936-1939. London: Weidenfeld & Nicolson. ISBN 978-0-297-84832-5.
- Bolloten, Burnett (1991). The Spanish Civil War: Revolution and Counterrevolution. UNC Press. ISBN 0-8078-1906-9.
- Casanova, Julián (2005). Anarchism, the Republic and Civil War in Spain: 1931-1939. Routledge. ISBN 0-415-32095-X.
- Christie, Stuart (2000). We, the Anarchists!: A Study of the Iberian Anarchist Federation (FAI), 1927-37. Christie Books. ISBN 1-901172-05-8.
- Paz, Abel (2007). Durruti in the Spanish Revolution. AK Press. ISBN 978-1-904859-50-5.
- Radosh, Ronald; Habeck, Mary R. (2001). Spain Betrayed: The Soviet Union in the Spanish Civil War. Yale University Press. ISBN 0-300-08981-3.

Preceded by Joaquín Maurín	General Secretary of the CNT; 1922–1923	Succeeded by Paulino Díez
Preceded by Segundo Blanco	General Secretary of the CNT; 1928–1929	Succeeded by Manuel Buenacasa
