= Cipriano Damiano =

Spanish anarcho-syndicalist (1916–1986)

Cipriano Damiano González
- Born: 22 September 1916; Comares, Spain
- Died: 17 April 1986 (aged 69); Sabadell, Spain
- Occupations: Publicist, editor, accountant
- Known for: Anarcho-syndicalist leader
- Political party: CNT
- Spouse: Isabel Vázquez Ríos
- Children: Cipriano Damiano Vázquez

Cipriano Damiano González (22 September 1916 – 17 April 1986) was a Spanish resistance fighter. He was leader in Spanish anarcho-syndicalism, a resistance fighter against Franco's dictatorship and an editor of political publications.

His father Federico Damiano y Silva, team foreman of Public Works, was based in a small town (Comares) where he met Cipriano's mother, Consuelo González Fernández. But his father died in 1922 of stomach cancer and she was forced to move to the province's capital of Málaga due to the difficult economic situation in which the family was left. In that city Cipriano was interned with his elder brother in the Casa de la Misericordia, a shelter for homeless kids. He began working when still a child selling candy and newspapers in the street, as a shoemaker's apprentice or as a clerk in public works, so all his training was as a worker and self-taught through reading.

== Biography ==
He was 14 when he enrolled in the CNT Trade Union (Confederación Nacional del Trabajo) after learning about the Jaca uprising of December 1930 and was deeply moved by captains' Fermín Galán and Ángel García Hernández executions by firing squad. On 16 May 1931, before turning 15 years old, he was arrested for the first time and by 1937 he had already been in prison for three full years –in his lifetime he'll do 22 years in jail or concentration camps: ten times arrested, Cipriano was put in prison 12 times (3 of them during the Second Republic) and went through 4 forced-labour battalions and concentration camps, breaking out of different detention centres in 9 opportunities –one of them from the very dungeons of Layetana's Police Headquarters in Barcelona.

In Málaga he was co-founder of the Libertarian Youth Movement (Juventudes Libertarias) and was secretary general first in the Local Federation and later in the Provincial Federation while also acting as manager of the main Food Industry Trade Union in CNT.

In 1935 he was a member of Málaga's "affinity group" Los Amantes de la Luz (The Light Lovers) with renowned libertarian activists Laya, Antonillo, El Chófer, Roa, Juan Santana Calero and Antonio El Carbonero. In 1936 he founded the anarchist Málaga's weekly Faro (Lighthouse, 1936–37) and contributed with several papers (Emancipación, in Almeria; Fragua Social; Hombres Libres de Guadix, Orto and Umbral). For a while he was able to combine his duties in the direction of the Libertarian Youth Provincial Committee with the management and public relations work at Faro and with sporadic visits to the frontline, until the fall of Málaga on 6 February 1937, when he had to flee northbound.

He covered on foot the 223 kilometres from Málaga to Almeria and there he reencountered Isabel Vázquez Ríos, who would be his life-long wife and mother of his only child, Cipriano Damiano Jr. He travelled with her to Valencia where he was given a managing position in the Propaganda Section of the Youth Regional Committee for Levante, and very soon he was elected secretary general in an Andalusian Libertarian Youth Congress. Back in Andalusia, he enrolled with the Maroto Brigade where he cofounded with Santana Calero and Antonio Morales Guzmán the magazine Nervio to educate the soldiers and provide a means of expression for the Brigade.After the defeat of the Republican forces by Franco's Army (supported by Hitler and Mussolini) he managed to arrive to the port of Alicante but was captured and sent to the concentration camps of Los Almendros and Albatera, first, then to Porta Coeli prison in Valencia and after that to Gardeny Castle in the city of Lerida, where he was assigned to the Forced Working Battalion number 26 with which he went through Ibars de Urgel, Tudela de Duero and Valladolid, from where he managed to arrive to Málaga and get into Gibraltar.

His popularity stemmed from his clandestine activities: under a false identity he gained a bureaucratic position in the Technical Commission for the Southern Coast Fortifications, with authority over all the area covering Algeciras, Tarifa, Barbate, Cádiz and Jerez de la Frontera, in Seville, and acted as a liaison to José Piñero for whom he provided contacts with the National Committee and Gibraltar, as well as official papers and vehicles. He also gave support to the guerrillas until he was discovered while serving at the Military Works Headquarters in Cádiz. He escaped swimming in the sea-water from beach to beach along the coast of the Strait of Gibraltar.

He reached Barcelona and joined the underground National Committee of Manuel Vallejo, where he's appointed vice secretary in 1949 and occupies the secretary post when Vallejo runs away in 1951. That same year Cipriano had a prominent role in the tramways strike of Barcelona which became a symbol of democratic fight as the first massive civic demonstration against Franco's dictatorship. He kept the position of secretary general until his arrest on 6 June 1953, in Madrid.

Sentenced by a military court in Madrid to 15 years of imprisonment (on 5 February 1954) he made the most of the next six years in jail (Carabanchel and Guadalajara) studying A Level (High School) and getting a diploma. Freed in 1959 he goes back to libertarian activist work and moves to Barcelona where he entered an advertising company and moved up the positions' ladder to the post of Chief Officer for Budget and Resources.

In Barcelona he continued working underground with Catalan activists and creates with other democratic leaders the group Renacer (Rebirth) in the effort to rebuild the shattered CNT first in Catalonia and later on in Levante and Andalusia. Struggle which will cost him two further arrests. Fruit of that organization effort was the emergence of the National Committee Francisco Calle Mansilla and as soon as it falls to the regime's repression Cipriano becomes head of the National Committee from April 1964 to 27 April 1965, when he's arrested again after a meeting at the American Consulate in the Via Layetana street of Barcelona.

Detained in the notorious police headquarters in that same street, he managed to escape from the dungeons and through the shielded security installations pretending to be one more of the numerous secret policemen that roamed the building. He made it across the border and into France where he was living in exile for several years.

Back from France under the false identity of Antonio González González, he moved back to Madrid where he opposed the pact known as Cincopuntismo –the agreements reached in the 60's between the Francoist Vertical Trade Unions and a fraction of the CNT– although he had previously supported the ASO and kept strong international links notably with the Swedish trade union SAC and the renowned German anarcho-syndicalist leader Helmut Rüdiger. His stay in Madrid ended with another arrest on 1 April 1970, after which he will spend 5 more years in jail. He didn't gain his ultimate freedom until March 1975. Once out of prison and living back in Barcelona, he worked for the newsweekly Interviú and contributed for the printed media Actual (weekly) El Correo Catalán, Diario de Barcelona, Mundo Diario (all of them dailies) and Sindicalismo (trade unions paper) among other publications.

He participated in the Libertarian Conference of Barcelona (July 1977) and abandoned CNT organic affiliation after the internal conflicts of the Casa de Campo Conference in Madrid. Later, he contributed with the Centro de Documentación Histórico-Social (CDHS) de Barcelona, La Hora de Mañana and Polémicos, and acted as well for a while as the executive editor of the trade unions magazine Solidaridad Obrera.

Throughout his life he used many pseudonyms, war-names and pen-names, like Segundo Canillo, El Niño, Cigadón, Devenir, Paco, León, Antonio González or Yayo and a dozen false identities to the point he was called "Man With A Thousand Faces" for his ability to disguise and go undercover. Cipriano Damiano died on 7 April 1986, in Sabadell (Barcelona).

Preceded by Miguel Vallejo Sebastián	General Secretary of the CNT in the Interior 1951–1953	Succeeded by Ismael Rodríguez Ajax

Preceded by Francisco Calle Mancilla	General Secretary of the CNT in the Interior 1964–1965	Succeeded by Francisco Royano Fernández
