= Gabriel León Trilla =

Spanish communist leader

- Born: 3 August 1899; Valladolid, Spain
- Died: 6 September 1945 (aged 46); Madrid, Spain
- Occupation: Communist leader
- Known for: Assassinated

Gabriel León Trilla (3 August 1899 – 6 September 1945) was a Spanish communist leader who was one of the founders of the Spanish Communist Party while in exile in Paris in the 1920s. He was expelled from the party in 1932 for supporting the Republican government, but was readmitted at the start of the Spanish Civil War (1936–39). During World War II (1939–45) he helped organize Spanish refugees in Spain as members of the French Resistance, then moved to Spain where he ran an underground newspaper. He was assassinated in 1945 on orders of the Communist Party of Spain on the grounds that his independent actions had endangered other communists.

== Early years (1899–1939) ==
Gabriel León Trilla was born in Valladolid in 1899. His father was an army colonel. He studied in Valladolid and Madrid, and earned a degree in humanities. He joined the Group of Socialist Students (Grupo de Estudiantes Socialistas, GES), which decided to support the Third International in October 1919. He moved to France in 1921 to avoid being drafted for the war in Morocco, and in Paris became one of the leaders of the Spanish communists. (Note: Another source says Trilla went to Africa with the Quartermaster Corps in 1921, but deserted while on leave.) For a period he sympathized with Leon Trotsky.

In 1924 Trilla became head of the secretariat of the Spanish communist groups in France. In 1925 Trilla was one of three leaders of the party. José Bullejos was secretary general, Trilla was secretary of agitation and propaganda and Luis Portela was organization secretary. Trilla represented the Communist Party of Spain (Partido Comunista de España, PCE) in the Communist International (Comintern). He married Anastasia Filippovna Barmashova in Moscow. They had two daughters. The first died at the age of six months. The second was born in 1931.

After General José Sanjurjo attempted a coup in Seville in August 1932 the PCE gave its support to the Republic. The Comintern denounced this stand, which it called "opportunism". As a result of this dispute between the PCE and Comintern, Bullejos was expelled from the leadership, as were Trilla, Manuel Adame and Etelvino Vega. Trilla was forced to leave his family behind when he left Moscow. Trilla was readmitted to the PCE in 1936. During the Spanish Civil War (1936–39) he again played a leadership role.

== World War II (1939–45) ==
After the fall of the Republican government in 1939 thousands of Spanish refugees were held in camps in France. Jesús Monzón organized those who remained into rural labor groups in Vichy France. These became the basis for the Agrupaciones de Guerrilleros Españoles (AGE), the Spanish maquis, which fought against the Germans. Monzón worked with Trilla in reorganizing the PCE members and placing them in the French Resistance. Monzón clandestinely entered Spain in the spring of 1943. In late 1943 Trilla returned to Spain from Nazi-occupied France to work for the PCE in Madrid.

Trilla and Monzón were recalled to France in 1944, but both feared they would be killed and remained in Spain. From 1944–45 Trilla edited the clandestine paper Mundo Obrero (Workers' World) in Madrid. By the summer of 1944 the AGE veterans of the Spanish Republic's Popular Army had made a significant contribution to defeating the Germans in the south of France. The "Latin Americans" and "Russians" in the PCE leadership frowned on the independent action of the French PCE as "resisters". Monzón made a failed attempt to start an insurrection against Francisco Franco through an invasion of the Val d'Aran in northern Spain by irregular forces in October 1944. He was accused by the party of collaborating with the enemy.

In 1945 the guerrilla group of Cristino García, a hero of the French Resistance, was sent to Spain to assassinate Trilla. There is disagreement about who ordered the assassination. Sergio Villar cites Enrique Líster, who blamed Santiago Carrillo and Dolores Ibárruri. García refused to carry out the order personally, because "he was a revolutionary and not a murderer". On 6 September 1945 Trilla went to a meeting with three comrades of the PCE in the Campo de las Calaveras, a former cemetery. It was a trap. Two of them held him while the third stabbed him to death. According to the party "Trilla acted on his own account as an authentic bandit; furthermore his work represented a risk for the underground organization and the security of many Communists. So he was executed by Cristino García's group."

== Sources ==
- Alba, Víctor (1983-01-01). The Communist Party in Spain. Transaction Publishers. ISBN 978-1-4128-1999-2.
- Belasko, Ana (1998-10-25). "Jesús Monzón, la primera víctima de Carrillo en el PCE". El Mundo (in Spanish).
- Bono, Ferran (2007-06-07). "Los hijos perdidos de Trilla". El País (in Spanish).
- Cuevas, Tomasa; Giles, Mary E. (1998). Prison of Women: Testimonies of War and Resistance in Spain, 1939-1975. SUNY Press. ISBN 978-0-7914-3857-2.
- Grandes, Amudena (2014-11-02). "Hace setenta años". El País (in Spanish).
- Heywood, Paul (2003-02-13). Marxism and the Failure of Organised Socialism in Spain, 1879-1936. Cambridge University Press. ISBN 978-0-521-53056-9.
- López-Valero Colbert, Olga (2007-01-01). The Gaze on the Past: Popular Culture and History in Antonio Muñoz Molina's Novels. Bucknell University Press. ISBN 978-0-8387-5650-8.
- Martorell, Manuel (2000-06-25). "Jesús Monzón: Comunista y martir". El Mundo (in Spanish).
- Ortiz, Javier (November 2000). "Jesús Monzón". Página abierta (in Spanish).
- Sánchez Cervelló, Josep; Agudo, Sebastián (2015-04-23). Las Brigadas Internacionales: Nuevas perspectivas en la historia de la Guerra Civil y del exilio. Publicacions Universitat Rovira I Virgili. ISBN 978-84-8424-363-2.
- Semprun, Jorge (1980-09-23). "Con motivo de un aniversario". El País (in Spanish).
