= Erika Conrado =

Spanish trade unionist

General Secretary of the Confederación Nacional del Trabajo
- Incumbent
- Assumed office 27 January 2024
- Preceded by: Antonio Díaz García

Personal details
- Born: Èrika Conrado Arredondo

Èrika Conrado Arredondo is a Spanish trade unionist.

== Biography ==
Conrado worked in the cooperative sector, part of Catalonia's solidarity economy. On 7 July 2022, Conrado was elected general secretary of the CNT's local committee in Vallès Oriental, replacing Cristian Carmona. From this post, she focused the CNT's organising efforts on women and precarious workers in the comarca's various industrial sectors. On 27 January 2024, the confederal plenary of the CNT elected Conrado to be the General Secretary of the national organisation; the headquarters of the CNT were subsequently moved to Granollers.

After the Supreme Court of Spain upheld prison sentences for the Suiza Six, Asturian CNT members who had been prosecuted for trade union organising in Xixón, Conrado declared that: "We are uncomfortable for the system. Our field is the street and what we cannot do is renounce it. It is part of our DNA and that is what we will continue to do. The comrades will not be alone at any time, and although we believe that this sentence is a bombshell for trade unionism, we will continue to be on the side of the workers." She added that "trade unionism is not a crime, although the Supreme Court ruling calls this into question". She pointed out that trade unionism is supposed to be protected under article 28 of the constitution of Spain and vowed to continue defending the six activists, even if it meant appealing to the European Court of Human Rights or the United Nations.

Conrado contacted other trade unions to solicit their help. She warned that, as a result of the court's decision, every Spanish trade union would be at risk of criminalisation for industrial actions. Together with representatives of the CCOO, UGT and CGT, Conrado attended a rally in Xixón to demonstrate support for the six CNT activists. She ultimately brought together several of the country's largest trade union centres in defense of the right to trade unionism.
