= Esteban Pallarols =

Catalan anarchist (1900–1943)

- Esteve Pallarols

General Secretary of the Confederación Nacional del Trabajo
- (interior)
- In office April 1939 – November 1939 Serving with Germinal Esgleas (in exile)
- Preceded by: Mariano R. Vázquez
- Succeeded by: Manuel López López

Personal details
- Born: Esteve Conrad Francesc Pallarols Xirgu; 18 July 1900 Cassà de la Selva, Girona, Spain
- Died: 18 July 1943 (aged 43) Barcelona, Spain
- Cause of death: Execution by shooting
- Parents: Joan Pallarols Cabarrocas (father); Rosa Xirgu Currins (mother)

Esteve Conrad Francesc Pallarols Xirgu (Note: Commonly known by the Spanish: Esteban Pallarols) (18 July 1900 – 18 July 1943) was a Catalan anarchist who became the first General Secretary of the CNT in clandestinity after the end of the Spanish Civil War. He organised the release of anarchist prisoners from Francoist concentration camps and their subsequent escape from Spain, for which he was executed by the Francoist authorities.

== Biography ==
After a long exile in Cuba, during the Spanish Civil War, Pallarols was a technical adviser to the libertarian collective of Llíria, in the province of Valencia. When the war ended, he was interned in the Albatera concentration camp. He managed to escape from the camp using documentation provided by a Madrid group of the Iberian Federation of Libertarian Youth (Spanish: Federación Ibérica de Juventudes Libertarias; FIJL), which it had obtained through one of its members who had infiltrated the Falange in Puente de Vallecas.

Pallarols immediately contacted three libertarian leaders who were in hiding in Valencia - José Cervera Bermell, Luis Úbeda Canero and Leoncio Sánchez Cardete - and the four of them formed the national board of the Spanish Libertarian Movement (MLE), established on 26 February 1939 by the CNT, the FAI and the FIJL. Their first activity was to forge documents that allowed the release of more libertarian prisoners from the Albatera camp and other camps in Valencia, who were quickly transferred to Barcelona and from there to France. To cover up the journeys, Pallarols created the shell corporation Frutera Levantina, officially dedicated to transporting fruit from Valencia to other parts of Spain. The task of creating the links in Catalonia and Occitania was entrusted to Génesis López and Manuel Salas, both recently released from the Albatera camp, who made contact in Nimes with various members of the MLE, and then López was taken to Paris where she met with the general secretary of the CNT, Germinal Esgleas, his companion Federica Montseny, and a few other libertarians. López managed to get 10,000 francs, which served to finance the passage of fifteen people to France.

Pallarols was arrested in Valencia by Franco's police, along with other members of the escape network he had set up. Eleven of those arrested were tried years later and sentenced to long prison terms. In a separate case, Pallarols was initially sentenced to 18 years in prison, but the judiciary elected to put him on trial again; this time he was accused of earlier alleged crimes and sentenced to death. He was shot on 18 July 1943. During his arrest, which according to other sources took place in Barcelona in February 1940, he was tortured: "He was given electric shocks, hung by his feet, subjected to fasting and sleep deprivation... until he spoke".

After Pallarols' arrest, a new national committee was formed, headed by Manuel López López, but he resigned shortly afterwards because of tuberculosis he had contracted during his stay in the Albatera camp, and was replaced by Celedonio Pérez Bernardo.

== Bibliography ==
- Heine, Hartmut (1983). La oposición política al franquismo. De 1939 a 1952 (in Spanish). Barcelona: Crítica. ISBN 84-7423-198-1.
- Lorenzo Rubio, César (2020). "La máquina represiva: la tortura en el franquismo". In Oliver Olmo, Pedro (ed.). La tortura en la España contemporánea (in Spanish). Madrid: Los Libros de la Catarata. pp. 131–198. ISBN 978-84-1352-077-3.
