= Suiza Six =

The Suiza Six are a group of six bakery workers at the Pastelería La Suiza in Gijón, Asturias. Members of the Confederación Nacional del Trabajo, the workers were imprisoned after leading a union campaign in support of one of their colleagues, who had raised concerns over her working conditions.

== History ==
In 2017, a worker at the Pastelería La Suiza in Gijón, Asturias, contacted the local branch of the Confederación Nacional del Trabajo (CNT) to raise concerns over the working conditions at the bakery. Among the specific concerns she raised were being made to work unpaid overtime, a lack of time off work, being forced to perform dangerous tasks when pregnant, and being subjected to sexual comments by the bakery's owner. The worker's boyfriend was also facing legal action from the bakery after starting a confrontation with the bakery's owner over the working conditions, in which the boyfriend damaged one of the bakery's freezers.

The CNT subsequently opened an investigation into the bakery, however, the owner refused to meet with the union. As a result, the union began organising rallies in the city denouncing the bakery, eventually pressuring the owner into a series of meetings. The meetings ended inconclusively, and the union began organising rallies again. In total, twelve rallies were held denouncing the bakery between May and September 2017.

The owner then filed a police complaint against the union, leading to the criminal conviction of six CNT members by a regional court on charges of harassment. The six were sentenced to three and a half years' incarceration each and fined over 100 000 €. In June 2024, the Supreme Court of Spain upheld the convictions. The Supreme Court ruled that the union's actions had not been "aimed at securing a worker's labour rights," but instead had been aimed at preventing the owner from "freely exercising their daily business activities," judging that the "harassment and pressure exerted were so severe that it resulted in the closure of the business." However, the bakery's premises had been listed on real estate websites for at least a year before the conflict with the union began.

== Reactions ==
The case has caused controversy among the Spanish and international left, with some accusing the courts of limiting union activism. The International Confederation of Labour has argued that "six people are convicted for carrying out trade union action... This sentence opens the way for thousands of people throughout the country to be sentenced for merely mobilizing in the face of a conflict." The case has also led to demonstrations in Spain and abroad, held in solidarity with the six.
