= José Peirats =

Spanish newspaper editor (1908–1989)

- Josep Peirats Valls
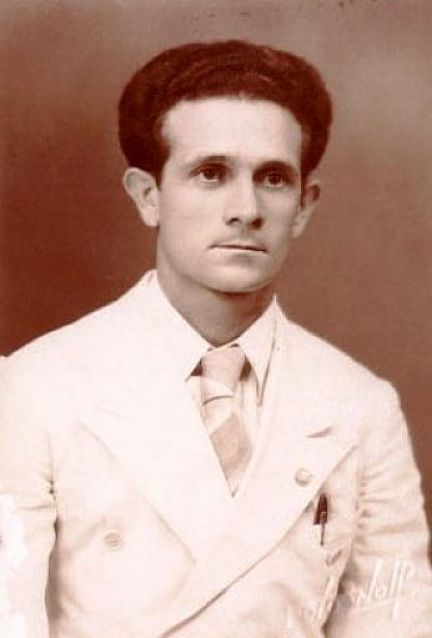
- Portrait of Peirats taken in the mid-1940s
- Born: José Peirats Valls; March 15, 1908; La Vall d'Uixó, Kingdom of Spain
- Died: August 20, 1989 (aged 81); Burriana, Kingdom of Spain
- Education: Escola Moderna
- Occupation(s): Brickmaker, journalist, historian
- Organizations: Confederación Nacional del Trabajo; Federación Anarquista Ibérica; Libertarian Youth; Spanish Libertarian Movement
- Notable work: Anarchists in the Spanish Revolution; The CNT in the Spanish Revolution
- Movement: Anarchism
- Parents: José Peirats Dupla (father); Teresa Valls Rubert (mother)

José Peirats Valls (1908–1989) was a Spanish anarchist, activist, journalist and historian.

== Biography ==
Peirats was born on March 15, 1908, in La Vall d'Uixó, Province of Castellón. He was the second child of Jose Peirats Dupla and Teresa Valls Rubert, who were day laborers, working as espadrille makers (espardenyers).

Peirats came to anarchism after moving in his early years to Barcelona. He was a long-standing member of the Confederación Nacional del Trabajo (CNT) and at one point edited its newspaper, Solidaridad Obrera ('Workers Solidarity').

Peirats was a member of anarchist groups Afinidad (1932) and Verdad (1932–1936). He was also a member of the federation of anarchist affinity groups, the Federación Anarquista Ibérica (FAI). An account cited him as part of a delegation sent to Paris in November 1936 to purchase weapons.

In 1989, Peirats died in Barcelona.

== Works ==
- Anarchists in the Spanish Revolution. London: Freedom Press, 1990. ISBN 0-900384-53-0.
- The CNT in the Spanish Revolution. ChristieBooks, Hastings, 2005: ISBN 1-901172-05-8 (vol. 1); ISBN 1-873976-24-0 (vol. 2); [2006]: ISBN 1-873976-29-1 (vol.3).
