= Paulino Díez =

Spanish trade unionist

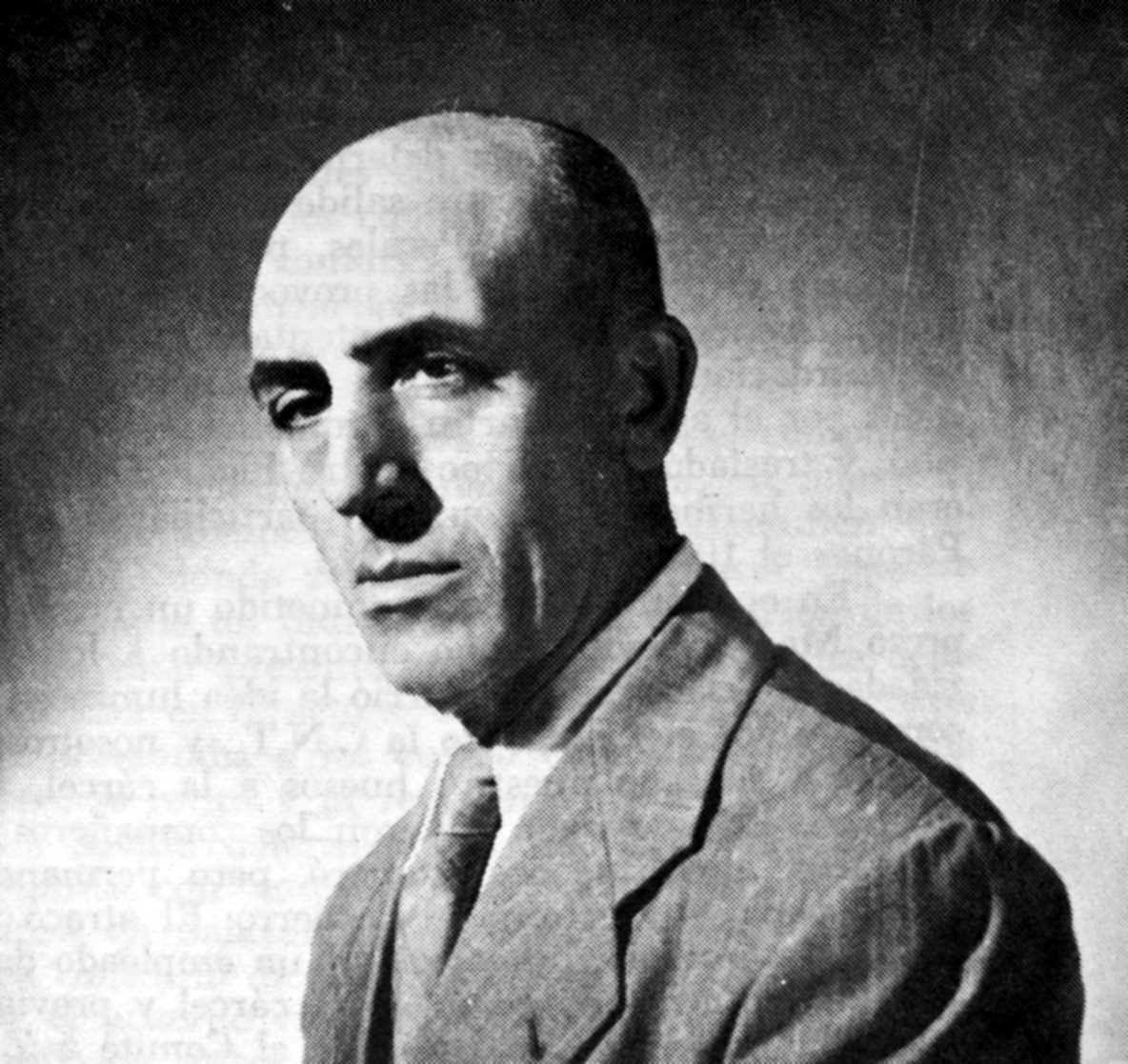
- Díez (c. 1939)

General Secretary of the Confederación Nacional del Trabajo
- In office August 1923 – March 1924
- Preceded by: Joan Peiró
- Succeeded by: José Gracian Galán

Personal details
- Born: Paulino Díez Martín; 4 May 1892 Burgos, Old Castile, Spain
- Died: 20 July 1980 (aged 88) Colón, Panama
- Profession: Carpenter

Paulino Díez Martín (Burgos, 4 May 1892 – Colón, 20 July 1980) was a Spanish anarcho-syndicalist leader. He wrote Una anarcosindicalista en acción. Memorias (Caracas, 1976).

== Biography ==
The son of untrained workers, he was expelled from various schools for indiscipline and at the age of 12 he began working as an apprentice tailor. In 1906, at the age of 14, he joined the Society of Carpenters and Cabinetmakers of Burgos, of which he was elected a member in 1908.

In 1910, he emigrated to Melilla to look for work in the construction of barracks for the army. There he contacted anarchist and socialist trade union organizers, participating in the carpenters' strike of 1910 and the construction strike of 1911. In 1912 he managed to legalize an anarchist trade union society and from 1914 was in charge of distributing libertarian press among the soldiers. He was arrested following Alfonso XIII's visit to Melilla on 2 April 1915, and again in July 1916 during the subsistence strike. He was one of those who denounced the smuggling scandal that led to the removal of military governor Federico de Monteverde, for which he suffered an attack in October 1916. He was arrested several times in 1917 and finally in October 1918 was expelled from Melilla due to his participation in the Rif miners' strike.

Shortly afterwards, he settled in Barcelona, where he joined the CNT's Sindicat de la Fusta, which in January 1919 elected him as Secretary of its Local Committee. He took part in the La Canadenca strike committee and in the rally in Plaça de Les Arenes. He was imprisoned in the Barcelona Model Prison from 3 April to 5 September 1919, accused of various crimes.

Advised by the management of the CNT, he moved to Málaga to continue his union work. He organized a strike in the port of Malaga and again went to Melilla to organize a bakers' strike in November 1919. In December 1919 he participated in the Second Confederal Congress of the CNT in Madrid as a representative of the Sindicato Único del Arte Fabril y textil de Málaga, in which he was one of the 24 signatories of the opinion on the ideological definition of the CNT, that declared that its purpose was the pursuit of libertarian communism.

In February 1920, he was also expelled from Malaga by the civilian governor and moved to Seville under a false name. There he participated in the organization of the different CNT unions in construction and the carpentry. He was arrested and tried along with other leaders on 16 October 1920, but was defended by Francesc Layret and was acquitted. He was arrested again on 4 January 1921 and taken prisoner to Las Torres, and then El Viso, before being imprisoned in a punishment cell in Córdoba prison for refusing to go to Mass. He was later confined to La Torre de San Juan Abad, from where, on 7 September 1921, he managed to escape to Puertollano and Peñarroya-Pueblonuevo, where he participated in the Rationalist School of Aquilino Medina, teaching young miners.

In 1922, he fell ill with a stomach ulcer and moved again to Melilla. In June 1922 he represented the unions of Melilla and Málaga at the Zaragoza Conference and in February 1923 at the Plenary Session of the CNT in Mataró. In August 1923 he was appointed General Secretary of the CNT but in December of that same year he was arrested again in Malaga. After six months in prison he was released and met on behalf of the CNT with Francesc Macià in Perpignan.

Due to the pressure of the dictatorship of Primo de Rivera on 7 July 1924, he left for Havana, where he worked in a brewery and in 1925 participated in the constitution of the Cuban National Workers' Confederation (Spanish: Confederación Nacional Obrera de Cuba, CNOC). Persecuted by the dictator Gerardo Machado, in July 1927 he left for the United States. In New York City he took part in events in support of Sacco and Vanzetti and in 1928 founded the magazine Solidaridad.

He returned to Barcelona when the Second Spanish Republic was proclaimed in 1931, and after meeting with the national committee of the CNT he settled in Melilla to organize the union sections. He was arrested and tried on charges of insulting the civilian governor, but his lawyer Eduardo Barriobero y Herrán saw him acquitted. In February 1932 he was arrested again accused of participating in the Alt Llobregat insurrection; he was deported to Almeria and then confined to Burgos on probation.

The coup d'état of 18 July 1936 surprised him in Melilla. After living in hiding for a while, in April 1937 he managed to escape to French Morocco, from where he went to Barcelona. He was in charge of reorganizing the Andalusian Regional Committee of the CNT, but could not go because of his ulcer, which was finally operated on in November 1938. He went to Perpignan to recover from the operation but was not able to return to Barcelona following the Catalonia Offensive. He was interned in the concentration camp of Saint-Cyprien until he managed to go by boat to Santo Domingo with his companion Áurea Cuadrado Castillón. He then returned to Havana, where he worked as a carpenter and construction worker, and then to Panama, where he died.

Preceded by Joan Peiró	General Secretary of the CNT; 1923–1924	Succeeded by José Gracian Galán
