= Confederación Nacional del Trabajo =

Anarcho-syndicalist trade union confederation in Spain

National Confederation of Labour
- Confederación Nacional del Trabajo
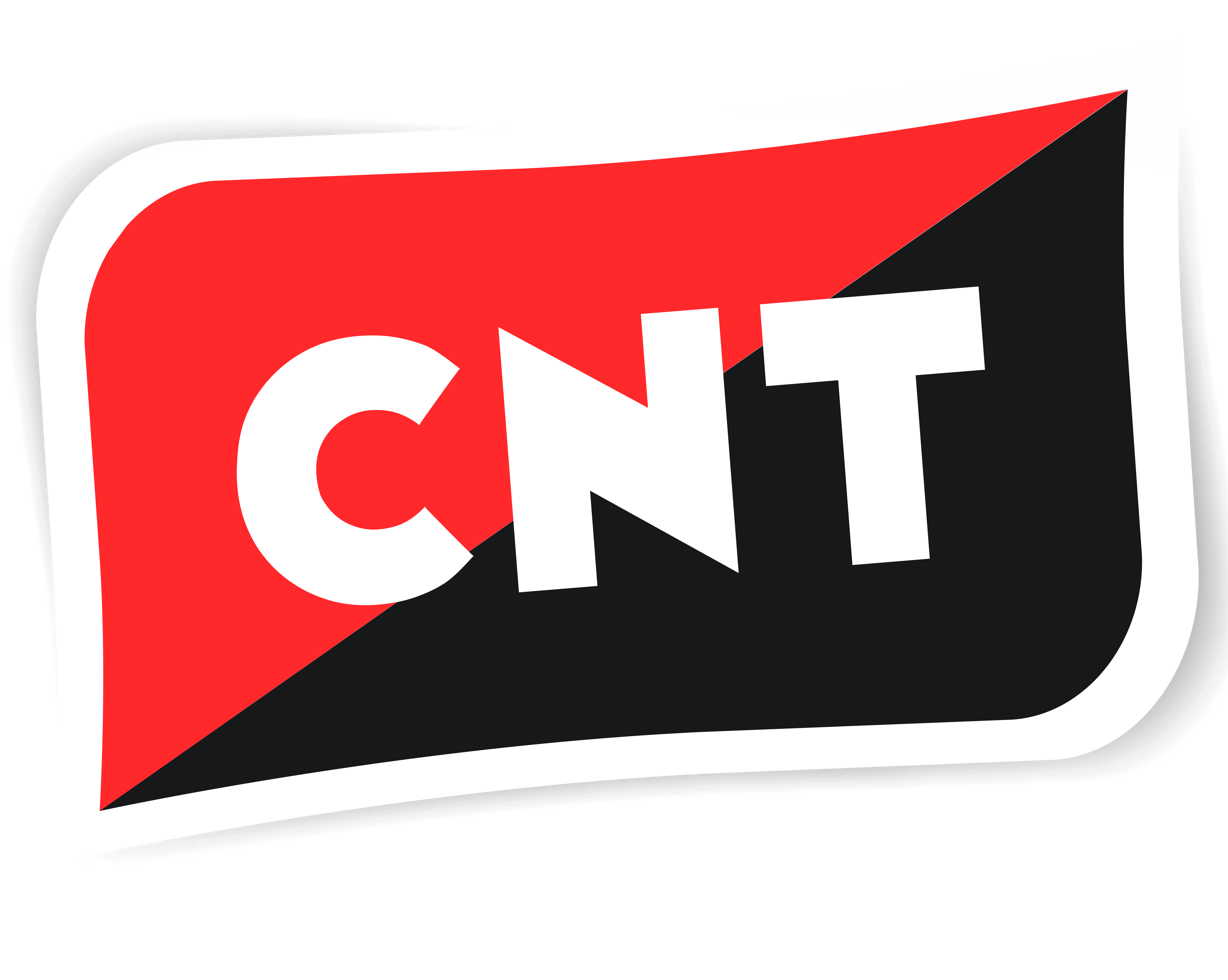
- CNT logo, since 2021

- CNT emblem
- Abbreviation: CNT
- Predecessor: Workers' Solidarity
- Established: 1 November 1910; 116 years ago
- Type: National trade union confederation
- Headquarters: Carrer Emili Botey Alsina, 14, Granollers (location changes with the General Secretary)
- Location: Spain
- Members: 8,000 (2022)
- General Secretary: Erika Conrado
- Affiliations: International Workers' Association (1922–2016); International Confederation of Labour (2018–present)
- Website: cnt.es

The Confederación Nacional del Trabajo (CNT; lit. 'National Confederation of Labor') is a Spanish anarcho-syndicalist trade union confederation.

Founded in 1910 in Barcelona from groups brought together by the trade union Solidaridad Obrera, it significantly expanded the role of anarchism in Spain, which can be traced to the creation of the Spanish chapter of the IWA in 1870 and its successor organization, the Federation of Workers of the Spanish Region. Despite several decades when the organization was illegal in Spain, the CNT continues to participate in the Spanish worker's movement, focusing its efforts on the principles of workers' self-management, federalism, and mutual aid.

Historically affiliated with the International Workers' Association (AIT), in 2018, the CNT and other unions founded the International Confederation of Labour (ICL-CIT).

== Organization and function ==
The CNT says of its membership, "We make no distinction at the time of admission, we require only that you are a worker or a student, employed or unemployed. The only people who cannot join are those belonging to repressive organizations (police, military, security guards), employers or other exploiters".

As a union organization, and in accordance with its bylaws, the aims of the CNT are to "develop a sense of solidarity among workers", hoping to improve their conditions under the current social system, prepare them for future emancipation, when the means of production have been socialized, to practice mutual aid amongst CNT collectives, and maintain relationships with other like-minded groups hoping for emancipation of the entire working class. The CNT is also concerned with issues beyond the working class, desiring a radical transformation of society through revolutionary syndicalism. To achieve their goal of social revolution, the organization has outlined a social-economic system through the confederal concept of anarchist communism, which consists of a series of general ideas proposed for the organization of an anarchist society. The CNT draws inspiration from anarchist ideas, and also identifies with the struggles of different social movements. The CNT is internationalist, but also supports communities' right of self-determination and their sovereignty over the state.

The CNT is rooted in three basic principles: workers' self-management or autogestión, federalism and mutual aid, and considers that work conflicts must be settled between employers and employees without the action of such intermediaries as official state organisms or professional unionists. This is why the union criticizes union elections and works councils as means of control for managers, preferring workers' assemblies, union sections and direct action. Also, when possible, the CNT avoids taking legal action through the courts. Administrative positions in the union rotate and are unpaid.

=== Structure ===
The organizational structure of the CNT is based on direct democracy.

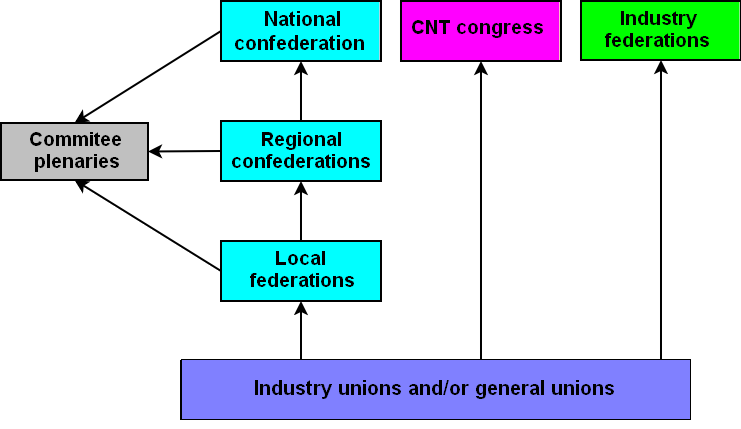
Diagram of the CNT organizational structure

The industrial unions (sometimes referred to as "branch unions") form the base structure of the CNT. Each industrial union groups together workers of different crafts within an industry. When there are fewer than 25 people working in one particular industry, a various posts union is formed for that industry, rather than multiple industry unions. A various posts union can include workers from different crafts and industries; it requires a minimum of five people. If this number cannot be reached, four or fewer workers can form a confederal group. Due to the small size of the CNT, a majority of its unions are various posts unions.

The decision-making power of the industry and various posts unions resides in the union assembly: decisions are taken by all of the workers of the union in question via a system of direct democracy and consensus. These assemblies may address any number of issues, whether "local, provincial, regional, national or international".

Unlike organizations that are organized from the top down, the CNT organises itself in an anarchistic fashion, from the bottom up, through different levels of confederations, following the Principle of Federation. The reason for favoring this structure is intended to limit homogeneity in committees, and keep them from having politics or programs. It is also intended to minimize the power of individuals who may be more active in the organization.

The different industry and various posts unions of a particular municipality constitute the local federation of unions that are coordinated by means of a local committee which has the same characteristics and powers as the union committees. The local committee is selected in the local plenary assembly to which every industry and various posts union can send delegations with written agreements previously adopted in their assembly. CNT has Local Federations in Madrid, Barcelona, Granada, and Seville.

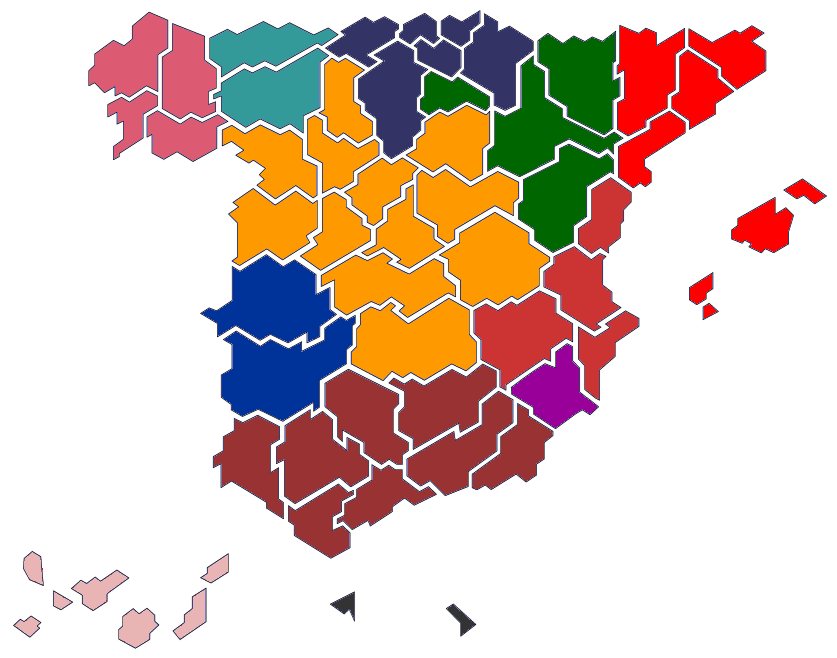
Regional map of the CNT: Andalusia Aragon-La Rioja Asturias-León Canary Islands Catalonia-Balearics Central / Extremadura Galicia Levante Murcia North

Direct representatives of the industry and various posts unions attend the CNT Congress with agreements from their own assemblies, independently from the local and regional levels. Among its duties, the Congress has to decide upon the CNT general line of action, and can appoint new National Committees. The initial constitutional congress was in September 1911, a year after the CNT's foundation.

All organs and trade unions within the CNT may have their own media. Solidaridad Obrera ("Workers' Solidarity") is the journal of the Regional Confederation of Labor of Catalonia. It was established in 1907, being the oldest communication medium of the CNT. Other media are La tira de papel, the Graphic Arts, Media and Shows National Coordinator bulletin; the Cenit, newspaper of the Regional Committee of the Exterior; and BICEL, edited by the Anselmo Lorenzo Foundation, which was created in 1987.

=== Voting ===
The CNT generally avoids bringing matters to a vote, preferring consensus decision-making, which it considers to be more in tune with its anarchist principles. While pure consensus is plausible for individual base unions, higher levels of organizations cannot completely avoid the need for some type of vote, which is always done openly by a show of hands.

Size of union		Votes
From	To	Votes
1	50	1
51	100	2
101	300	3
301	600	4
601	1,000	5
1,001	1,500	6
1,501	2,500	7
2,501	more	8

The problem arises when decisions have to be made in local or regional plenaries or congresses. It has already been explained that the basic structure of the CNT is the industrial union branch, or where these do not exist, the union of various occupations. Well then, there is no completely fair method for making decisions through voting:

- If each union gets one vote, a union of 1,000 members would have the same voice in decisions as a union of 50. Two unions of 25 (2 votes) could impose their will upon a union of 1,000 (1 vote).
- If votes are by the number of members, a union of 2,000 members would have 2,000 votes, and 100 unions of 20 members would have the same voice in decisions as just one union. The geographical distribution of 100 unions is wider than that of just one, but an agreement obligates all unions equally even though a small union would have the same responsibility to enforce it as a big union, in spite of the greater difficulty for the small one.
- We find besides the problem of minorities. For example, union A decides to go on strike by 400 votes against 350, and would have to support its decision to strike, since that was the outcome of its assembly. Union B of the same local federation says no to the strike by 100 votes to 25. Union C of the local federation says yes by a unanimous 15 votes. There are thus two unions in favour of the strike and one against, so a strike would be called if based on one vote per union. But adding the negative votes together, 450 voted against the strike, leaving 440 in favour.

— Basic Anarcho-syndicalism

The CNT attempts to minimize this problem by a system of limited proportional voting. Even so, this system has some failures and may discriminate against unions with larger memberships. As an example, "ten unions with 25 adherents would total 250 members having 10 votes. This would be more votes than a union of 2,500, which with 10 times more members would only have the right to 7 votes." Within the CNT this isn't considered a major problem, because agreements tend to reach consensus after long discussions. However, due to the nature of consensus decision-making, the final agreements consensed to may bear little resemblance to the initial proposals brought to the table.

== History ==
=== The early years ===
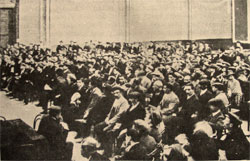
The 1910 Congress

In 1910, in the middle of the restoration, the CNT was founded in Barcelona in a congress of the Catalan trade union Solidaridad Obrera (Workers' Solidarity) with the objective of constituting an opposing force to the then-majority trade union, the socialist UGT and "to speed up the economic emancipation of the working class through the revolutionary expropriation of the bourgeoisie". The CNT started small, counting 26,571 members represented through several trade unions and other confederations. In 1911, coinciding with its first congress, the CNT initiated a general strike that provoked a Barcelona judge to declare the union illegal.

From 1918 on the CNT grew stronger. Around that time, panic spread among employers, giving rise to the practice of pistolerismo (employing thugs to intimidate active unionists), causing a spiral of violence which significantly affected the trade union. These pistoleros were known to have killed 21 union leaders in 48 hours. The CNT had an outstanding role in the events of the La Canadiense general strike, which paralyzed 70% of industry in Catalonia in 1919, the year the CNT reached a membership of 700,000. In 1922 the International Workingmen's Association (later International Workers' Association) was founded in Berlin; the CNT joined immediately. However, the following year, with the rise of Miguel Primo de Rivera's dictatorship, the labor union was again outlawed.

In 1927 with the "moderate" positioning of some cenetistas (CNT members) the Federación Anarquista Ibérica (FAI), an association of anarchist affinity groups, was created in Valencia. The FAI would play an important role during the following years through the so-called trabazón (connection) with the CNT, that is, the presence of FAI elements in the CNT, encouraging the labor union not to move away from its anarchist principles, an influence that continues today.

=== The Second Republic ===
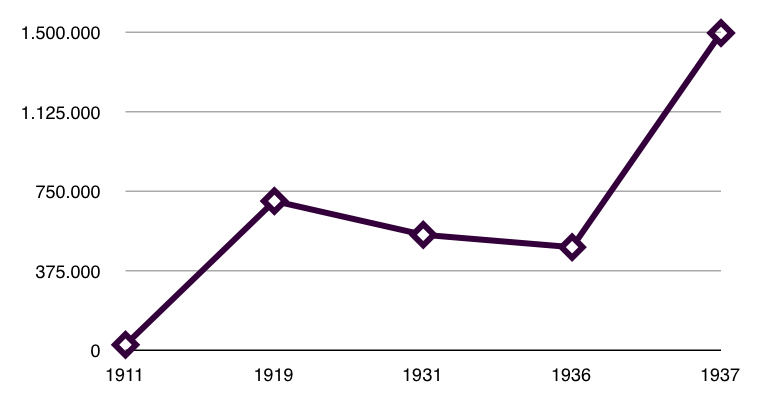
Evolution of the number of affiliates in the CNT from 1911 to 1937

After the fall of the monarchy in 1931, the CNT offered minimal support to the Second Republic. This support decreased progressively during the years between 1931 and 1933 because of constant confrontations with the republican authorities in the successive general strikes, including the 1931 Barcelona rent strike. The end of that period was marked by so-called revolutions of January and December, both of which were swiftly suppressed by the government. In those days the CNT functioned primarily in Catalonia, but was also gaining importance in other regions, such as Andalusia and Aragon (where it had a higher membership than the UGT).

In Ceuta, the CNT's organ was the weekly Despertar, launched in December 1931, but its publication was discontinued the next year.

Tensions between the radical faístas, or FAI members, and the moderate non-faístas were constant and difficult to analyze because of the decentralized and sectorial nature of the organization. Finally, in 1931 a group of moderates published the Manifesto of the Thirty, which would give rise to Treintism (from treinta, thirty in Spanish), and in 1932 Ángel Pestaña split from the CNT to create the Syndicalist Party.

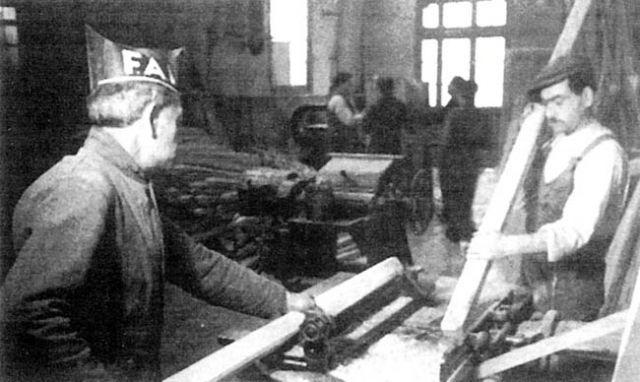
CNT-FAI worker cooperative in Barcelona producing wood and steel products

In January 1932 a revolutionary strike organized by the CNT took place in Alt Llobregat, Catalonia. In some places the workers took control of the streets and proclaimed libertarian communism replacing the republican flags with the red and black ones. The strike was suppressed by the use of the police and the military and several leading figures of the workers' side were arrested and some deported to Spanish colonies in Africa (Spanish Morocco, Western Sahara and Guinea).

In January 1933 a revolution was carried out by the CNT. The first acts of the insurrection took place on January 1, with bombs exploding in La Fulguera, Asturias, and street riots in Seville, Lleida and Pedro Muñoz. By 8 January the revolution had spread to most of Spain reaching its greatest resonance in Andalusia. The revolution was violently suppressed: in Bugarra, where the workers had proclaimed libertarian communism after an intense combat with the police, the Guardia Civil retook control of the town and killed 10 peasants while also detaining 250 more. The most well-known case of repression was the Casas Viejas incident which discredited the government partly leading to its electoral defeat in 1933 elections. During riots in Casas Viejas, where workers had proclaimed libertarian communism, two police officers were wounded, leading the government to send larger police forces to arrest rioters and stop the rebellion. Many peasants fled the town but a group of anarchists resisted arrest and were barricaded in the house of an anarchist, Francisco Cruz Gutiérrez. When the guards under the command of Captain Rojas arrived, they set the house on fire with the anarchists and their families still inside. Everyone inside the house was killed except for Maria Silva Cruz and a little boy. The police then gathered all villagers who owned a gun, marched them to the ashes of the burned house and shot them dead.

The third insurrection carried out by the CNT during the Second Spanish Republic was in December 1933 after the 1933 elections. It had its epicenter in Zaragoza and more generally in Aragon and La Rioja and it extended to parts of Extremadura, Andalusia, Catalonia and the mining basin of León. It lasted about a week before being completely dominated by law enforcement and in some places by the intervention of the army.

The two years governed by the coalition of the center to center-right Partido Republicano Radical and the right to far-right CEDA were marked by mostly clandestine CNT activity, in the face of severe government repression. During the socialist Revolution of October 1934 (at which point membership in the CNT reached 1.58 million) the CNT participated only from the background. However, the CNT's Regional Confederation of Labor of Asturias, León and Palencia actively participated in the revolution because of its loyalty to workers' alliances, this time formalized through the Uníos Hermanos Proletarios (UHP; Unite Brothers of the Proletariat) in the pact with the UGT and the Asturian Socialist Federation. Thus, in La Felguera and in El Llano district of Gijón there were short periods when anarchist communism was put into practice:

In the El Llano barricade they proceeded to regularize life according CNT postulates: socialization of wealth and abolition of authority and capitalism. It was a brief experience of great interest, as the revolutionaries did not rule the town. ... A procedure was followed similar to the one in La Felguera. For organization of consumption a Supply Committee was created, with street delegates established in the grocery stores who controlled the number of neighbors in each street and produced the distribution of food. This street-by-street control made it easy to determine the amount of bread and other goods needed. The Supply Committee managed the general control over the available stock, especially flour.

— Manuel Villar, Anarchism in the Asturian Insurrection: The CNT and FAI in October 1934

The CNT held a congress in Saragossa on 1 May 1936, ratifying the position that the union should make no pacts with any political party, despite UGT leader Largo Caballero's attempts to persuade the union to stand in unity with the UGT. On 1 June, the CNT joined the UGT in declaring a strike of "building workers, mechanics, and lift operators." A demonstration was held, 70,000 workers strong. Members of the Falange attacked the strikers. The strikers responded by looting shops, and the police reacted by attempting to suppress the strike. By the beginning of July, the CNT was still fighting, while the UGT had agreed to arbitration. In retaliation to the attacks by the Falangists, anarchists killed three bodyguards of the Falangist leader José Antonio Primo de Rivera. The government then closed the CNT's centers in Madrid, and arrested David Antona and Cipriano Mera, two CNT militants.

=== The Civil War ===
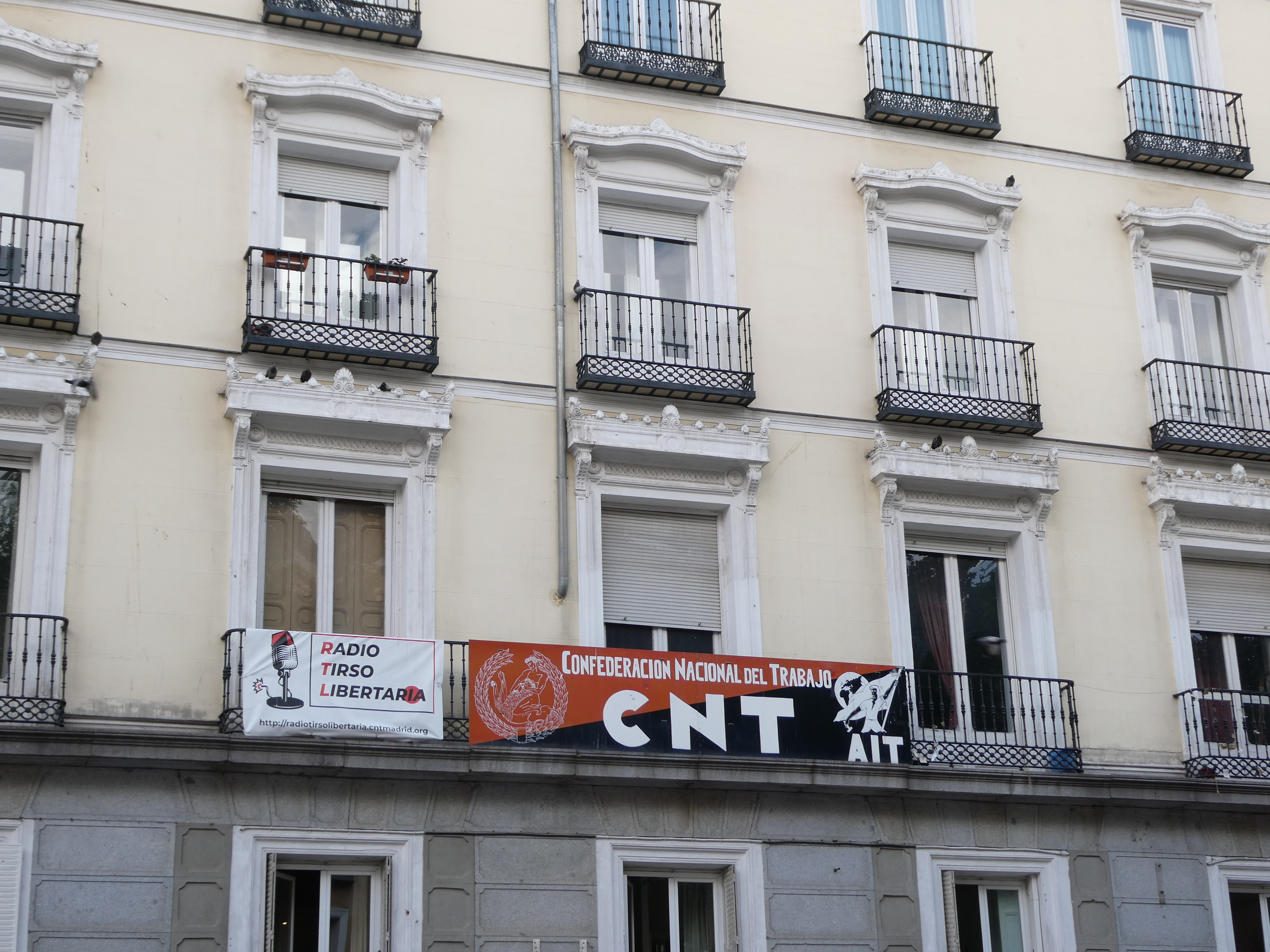
CNT Madrid offices

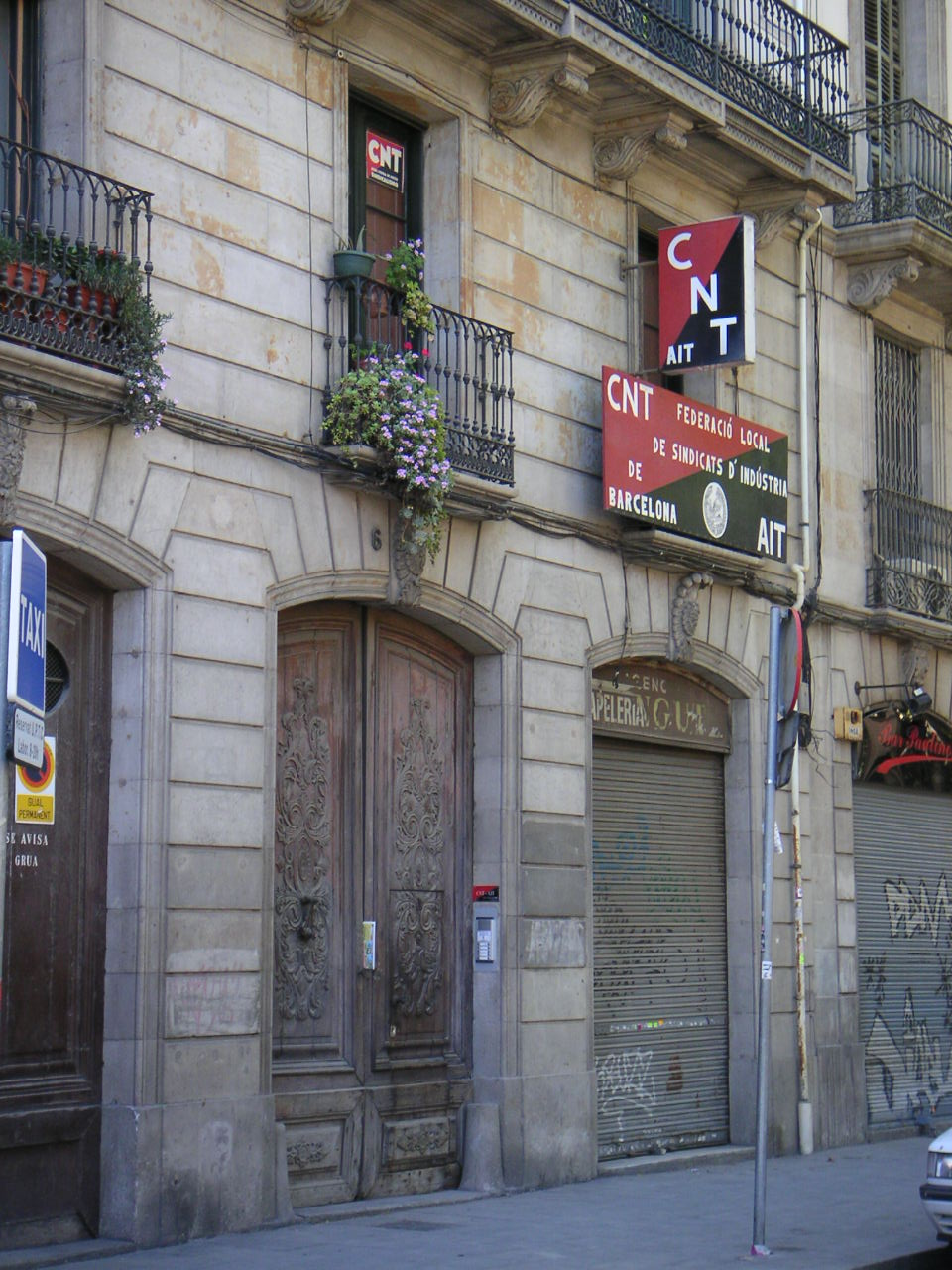
CNT Barcelona offices

The Civil War era also showed a spirit of sexual revolution. The anarchist women's organization Mujeres Libres established an equal opportunity for women in a society that traditionally had held women in lower regard. Women acquired power they had not previously had in Spanish society, fighting at the front and doing heavy jobs, things that had been forbidden to them until then. Free love became popular, although some parents' distrust produced the creation of the revolutionary weddings, informal ceremonies in which the couples declared their status, and that could be annulled if both parties didn't want to continue their relationship.

Following Largo Caballero's assumption of the position of Prime Minister of the government, he invited the CNT to join in the coalition of groups making up the national government. The CNT proposed instead that a National Defense Council should be formed, led by Largo Caballero, and containing five members each from the CNT and UGT, and four "liberal republicans". When this proposal was declined, the CNT decided not to join the government. However, in Catalonia, the CNT joined the Central Committee of the Anti-Fascist Militias, which joined the Generalitat on 26 September. For the first time, three members of the CNT were also members of the government.

In November, Caballero once again asked the CNT to become part of the government. The leadership of the CNT requested the finance and war ministries, as well as three others, but were given four posts, the ministries of health, justice, industry, and commerce. With Federica Montseny became Minister of Health, the first female minister in Spain. Juan García Oliver, as minister of justice, abolished legal fees and destroyed all criminal files. Shortly afterwards, despite the disapproval of the anarchist ministers, the capital was moved from Madrid to Valencia. In Catalonia CNT was instrumental in preventing a Catalanist coup d'état, planned in November by Estat Català.

Halfway through February 1937, a congress took place in Caspe with the purpose of creating the Regional Federation of Collectives of Aragon. 456 delegates, representing more than 141,000 collective members, attended the congress. The congress was also attended by delegates of the National Committee of the CNT.

At a plenary session of the CNT in March 1937, the national committee asked for a motion of censure to suppress the Aragonese Regional Council. The Aragonese regional committee threatened to resign, which thwarted the censure effort. Though there had always been disagreements, that spring also saw a great escalation in confrontations between the CNT-FAI and the Communists. In Madrid, Melchor Rodríguez, who was then a member of the CNT, and director of prisons in Madrid, published accusations that the Communist José Cazorla, who was then overseeing public order, was maintaining secret prisons to hold anarchists, socialists, and other republicans, and either executing, or torturing them as "traitors". Soon after, on this pretext, Largo Caballero dissolved the Communist-controlled Junta de Defensa. Cazorla reacted by closing the offices of Solidaridad Obrera.

In Catalonia, the Catalan Communists in the Catalan government made several demands that provoked the ire of the anarchists, in particular the call for turning all weapons over to the control of the government. The 8 April 1937 issue of Solidaridad Obrera opined, "We have made too many concessions and have reached the moment of turning off the tap". In May, the CNT's Barcelona regional committee declared a general strike. The CNT controlled the majority of the city, including the heavy artillery on the hill of Montjuïc overlooking the city. CNT militias disarmed more than 200 members of the security forces at their barricades, allowing only CNT vehicles to pass through. After unsuccessful appeals from the CNT leadership to end the fighting, the government began transferring Assault Guard from the front to Barcelona, and even destroyers from Valencia. On 5 May, the Friends of Durruti issued a pamphlet calling for "disarming of the paramilitary police… dissolution of the political parties…" and declared "Long live the social revolution! – Down with the counter-revolution!" The pamphlet was quickly denounced by the leadership of the CNT. The next day, the government agreed to a proposal by the leadership of the CNT-FAI, that called for the removal of the Assault Guards, and no reprisals against libertarians that had participated in the conflict, in exchange for the dismantling of barricades, and end of the general strike. However, neither the PSUC or the Assault Guards gave up their positions, and according to historian Antony Beevor "carried out violent reprisals against libertarians" By 8 May, the fighting was over.

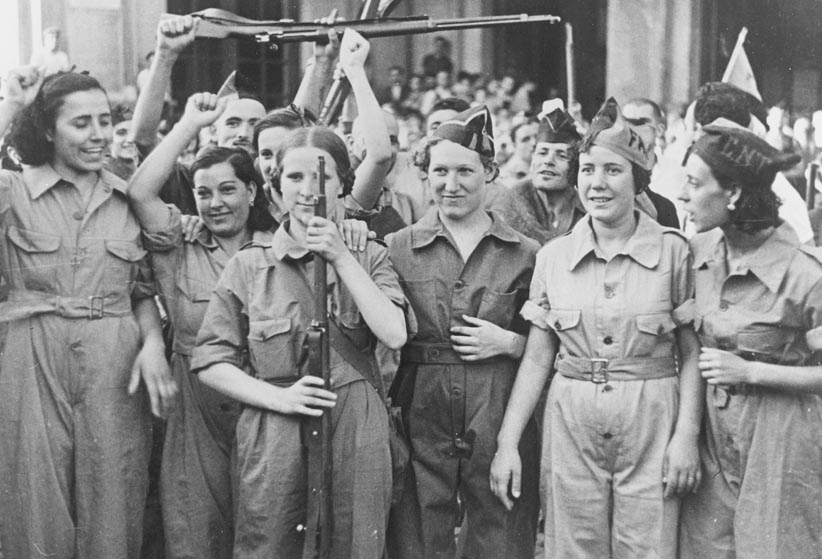
Catalan CNT militiawomen, 1937

These events, the fall of Largo Caballero's government, and the new prime ministership of Juan Negrín soon led to the collapse of much that the CNT had achieved immediately following the rising the previous July. At the beginning of July, the Aragonese organizations of the Popular Front publicly declared their support for the alternative council in Aragon, led by their president, Joaquín Ascaso. Four weeks later the 11th Division, under Enrique Líster, entered the region. On 11 August 1937, the Republican government, now situated in Valencia, dismissed the Regional Council for the Defense of Aragon. Líster's division was prepared for an offensive on the Aragonese front, but they were also sent to subdue the collectives run by the CNT-UGT and in dismantling the collective structures created the previous twelve months. The offices of the CNT were destroyed, and all the equipment belonging to its collectives was redistributed to landowners. The CNT leadership not only refused to allow the anarchist columns on the Aragon front to leave the front to defend the collectives, but they failed to condemn the government's actions against the collectives, causing much conflict between it and the rank and file membership of the union.

In April 1938, Juan Negrín was asked to form a government, and included Segundo Blanco, a member of the CNT, as minister of education, and by this point, the only CNT member left in the cabinet. At this point, many in the CNT leadership were critical of participation in the government, seeing it as dominated by the Communists. Prominent CNT leaders went so far as to refer to Blanco as "sop of the libertarian movement" and "just one more Negrínist." On the other side, Blanco was responsible for installing other CNT members into the ministry of education, and stopping the spread of "Communist propaganda" by the ministry.

In March 1939, with the war nearly over, CNT leaders participated in the National Defense Council's coup overthrowing the government of the Socialist Juan Negrín. Those involved included the CNT's Eduardo Val and José Manuel González Marín serving on the council, while Cipriano Mera's 70th Division provided military support, and Melechor Rodríquez became mayor of Madrid.

=== Franco era and transition to democracy ===
In 1939 the Law of Political Responsibilities outlawed the CNT and expropriated its assets. At that time the organization had a million members and a large infrastructure. According to one estimate, roughly 160,000–180,000 members of the CNT were killed by the Franco government.

The CNT acted clandestinely inside Spain during the Franco years, as well as conducting activities from exile, and some members kept on fighting the Spanish State until 1948 through the guerrilla actions of maquis. There was much disagreement amongst factions of the CNT during these years. There was a major split after the National Committee inside Spain chose to support members of the Republican government in exile, while members of the Libertarian Movement in Exile (MLE) (basically the CNT-in-exile) stood against further collaboration with the government. Even Federica Montseny, who had joined the Republic as Minister of Health changed her stance on collaboration, describing the "futility of...participation in the government."

In January 1960, the MLE was formed by the CNT, the FAI, and the FIJL. In September of the next year, a congress was held in Limoges, at which the Sección Defensa Interior (DI) was created, to be partially funded by the CNT. By this point, a great majority of the CNT-in-exile had given up on political action as a tool, and one of the main goals of the DI was to assassinate Franco. These divergent attitudes combined with Franco's repression to weaken the organization, and the CNT lost influence among the population inside Spain.

After Franco's death in November 1975 and the beginning of Spain's transition to democracy, the CNT was the only social movement to refuse to sign the 1977 Moncloa Pact, an agreement amongst politicians, political parties, and trade unions to plan how to operate the economy during the transition. In 1979, the CNT held its first congress since 1936 as well as several mass meetings, the most remarkable one in Montjuïc. Views put forward in this congress would set the pattern for the CNT's line of action for the following decades: no participation in union elections, no acceptance of state subsidies, no acknowledgment of works councils, and support of union sections.

One year before, the 1978 Scala Case affected the CNT. An explosion killed three people in a Barcelona night club. The authorities alleged that striking workers "blew themselves up", and arrested surviving strikers, implicating them in the crime. CNT members declared that the prosecution sought to criminalize their organization:

In 1996, the Economic and Social Council facilities in Madrid were squatted by 105 CNT militants.

=== Split with the CGT (1979–1989) ===
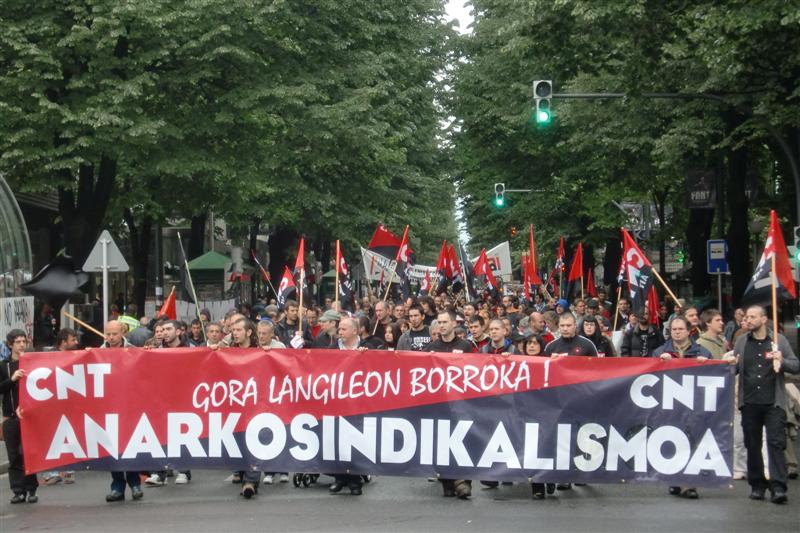
International Workers' Day demonstration in Bilbao in 2010.

Following the Spanish transition to democracy, the Moncloa Pacts outlined the new structure for Spanish society and was approved by all social movements, with the exception of the CNT, which refused to ratify it. The pacts established a new system of works councils, in which workers in a given workplace would elect union representatives to negotiate with their employers. By the 1980s, the issue of participation in these union elections had caused a split in the CNT.

In July 1980, delegates that supported electoral participation, representing 100 of the CNT's trade unions, established a commission to chart a new course for the CNT. The "official" sector of the CNT dismissed members of the commission, who also received death threats and were physically assaulted, prompting the dissident faction to establish self-defense units and eventually forcing the "official" sector of the CNT to prohibit further violence. At the CNT's Barcelona Congress, held in January 1983, a dispute broke out between the two factions, as the pro-election "renovators" and anti-election "officials" held roughly equal voting shares. At a subsequent Extraordinary Congress, held in Torrejón de Ardoz in March–April 1983, the "officials" blocked the "renovators" from speaking or voting, resulting in the passage of anti-electoral resolutions. The "renovators", including general secretary José Bondía, resigned in protest and joined the dissident faction of the CNT.

In 1989, the Supreme Court of Spain banned the dissident faction from using the name of the CNT. The pro-electoral faction subsequently reorganised into the General Confederation of Labour (CGT), which began to participate in union elections, while the CNT itself continued to oppose electoral participation. Participation in the union elections resulted in the growth of the CGT, which became one of the largest union centers in the country, while the CNT maintained a relatively small membership.

=== Split with the AIT (2010–2018) ===
By the 21st century, the CNT had split into two factions: the anarchist faction, which saw the CNT mainly as a political organisation; and the syndicalist faction, which viewed the CNT as a workers' organisation for taking industrial action. The anarchist faction concentrated on maintaining the ideological purity of the organisation, in opposition to reformist tendencies; it was opposed to any rapprochement with the CGT, believed there to be a conspiracy to reunify the two confederations, and staunchly refused to cooperate with any other organisation. On the other side, the syndicalist faction was chiefly concerned with the marginalisation of the CNT in the labour movement, which it believed to have resulted from its failure to organise trade unions. The syndicalists prioritised union activities and believed that anarcho-syndicalism needed to be updated for modern material conditions; they also advocated for cooperation with other organisations in industrial actions. The anarchist faction was largely led by charismatic leaders, who acted as unifying forces within their organisations and were driven by their visions of a future anarchist society. In contrast, the syndicalist faction was led by administrators, people who were experienced in organising and were easily replaceable. Both factions competed for control over the organisation, causing internal conflicts that disrupted operations and even drove away members.

The internal conflict came to a head at the CNT's 10th Congress, held in Córdoba in 2010. The congress resolved to reinforce the CNT's industrial action by hiring a technical team of lawyers and economists, refine its organiser training methods and refocus its efforts on recruiting more members and electing more workplace representatives. Although this resulted in the growth of the organisation, a number of local branches rejected the changes, which they denounced as "reformist" and "un-democratic", and split off from the CNT. The strategic changes also caused conflict between the CNT and other members of the IWA-AIT, particularly the Confederation of Russian Anarcho-Syndicalists (KRAS) and the Union of Syndicalists of Poland (ZSP).

In 2016, the CNT, along with the Italian Syndicalist Union (USI) and the Free Workers' Union (FAU), were expelled from the AIT; they were the three largest union federations in the international, representing up to 90% of its working membership. In 2018, the CNT, USI and FAU established the International Confederation of Labour (Spanish: Confederación Internacional del Trabajo; CIT), which also attracted the affiliation of the North American Industrial Workers of the World (IWW) and the Argentine Regional Workers' Federation (FORA). At the time of its founding, the new international counted 10,000 working members, of which the CNT itself represented 5,000 members.

Meanwhile, local unions that had split from the CNT held a conference in Villalonga; they established a splinter organisation called the CNT-AIT, which received the official recognition of the AIT. The nascent CNT-AIT was organisationally weak, counting less than 1,000 members between a dozen local branches and carrying out no trade union activities. Since the split, the CNT-CIT and the CNT-AIT have remained actively hostile towards each other.

== See also ==
- 1917 Spanish general strike
- 1926 Spanish coup d'état
- 1929 Spanish coup d'état
- Industrial unionism
- Labor movement in Spain
- Second biennium of the Second Spanish Republic

== Bibliography ==
- Correa, Felipe (2023). "The Global Revival of Anarchism and Syndicalism". In van der Linden, Marcel (ed.). The Cambridge History of Socialism. Vol. 1. Cambridge University Press. pp. 621–647. doi:10.1017/9781108611022.027. ISBN 978-1-108-48134-2.
- Las Heras, Jon; Roca, Beltrán (2023). "New practices in industrial relations: radical unionism in the European periphery". Work and Employment Relations in Southern Europe. Edward Elgar Publishing. pp. 137–162. doi:10.4337/9781789909548.00012. ISBN 978-1-78990-954-8.
- Esenwein, George (2023). "Spain in Revolt: The Revolutionary Legacy of Anarchism and Anarcho-Syndicalism". In van der Linden, Marcel (ed.). The Cambridge History of Socialism. Vol. 1. pp. 380–410. doi:10.1017/9781108611022.017. ISBN 978-1-108-48134-2.
- Roca Martínez, Beltrán (2006). "Anarchism, anthropology and Andalucia: An Analysis of the CNT and the 'New Capitalism'" (PDF). Anarchist Studies. 14 (2). Translated by Gemie, Sharif. Lawrence & Wishart: 106–130. ISSN 0967-3393. Archived from the original (PDF) on 28 February 2011.
- Torres, Maggie (2019). Anarchism and Political Change in Spain: Schism, Polarisation and Reconstruction of the Confederación Nacional del Trabajo, 1939-1979. Sussex Academic Press. ISBN 9781845199364.

Other sources

- CNT (2001). Anarcosindicalismo básico (in Spanish). Seville: Federación Local de Sindicatos de Sevilla de la CNT-AIT. ISBN 84-920698-4-8.
  - CNT; Stein, Jeff (1998). Basic Anarcho-Syndicalism (PDF). Johannesburg, South Africa: Zabalaza Books. Archived from the original (PDF) on 27 February 2008. Excerpts from the 1998 edition of Anarcosindicalismo básico were translated by Jeff Stein and published first in the Anarcho-Syndicalist Review, then as a pamphlet (PDF linked). Direct quotations in this article follow Stein's wording for passages he has translated. Note that the pagination of the linked PDF places two pages of the pamphlet on each PDF page; cited page numbers follow the pamphlet itself.
- Aguilar Fernández, Palomar (2002). Memory and Amnesia: The Role of the Spanish Civil War in the Transition to Democracy. Berghahn Books. ISBN 1-57181-496-5.
- Ackelsberg, Martha A. (2005). Free Women of Spain: Anarchism and the Struggle for the Emancipation of Women. Oakland: AK Press. ISBN 1-902593-96-0.
- Alexander, Robert (1999). Anarchists in the Spanish Civil War. Janus Publishing Company. ISBN 1-85756-412-X.
- Beevor, Antony (2006). The Battle for Spain: The Spanish Civil War 1936–1939. London: Weidenfeld & Nicolson. ISBN 978-0-297-84832-5.
- Bowen, Wayne H. (2006). Spain During World War II. University of Missouri Press. ISBN 0-8262-1658-7.
- Christie, Stuart (2002). My Granny Made Me an Anarchist: The Cultural and Political Formation of a west of Scotland 'baby-boomer'. Christie Books. ISBN 1-873976-14-3.
- Christie, Stuart (2003). General Franco Made Me A 'Terrorist'. Christie Books. ISBN 1-873976-19-4.
- Gómez Casas, Juan (1986). Anarchist Organisation: The History of the F.A.I.. Black Rose Books Limited. ISBN 0-920057-38-1.
- Geary, Dick (1989). Labour and Socialist Movements in Europe Before 1914. Berg Publishers. ISBN 0-85496-705-2.
- Guérin, Daniel (2005). No Gods No Masters: An Anthology of Anarchism. Translated by Sharkey, Paul. AK Press. ISBN 978-1-904859-25-3.
- Horn, Gerd-Rainer (1996). European Socialists Respond to Fascism: Ideology, Activism and Contingency in the 1930s. Oxford University Press US. ISBN 0-19-509374-7.
- Meltzer, Albert (1996). I Couldn't Paint Golden Angels: Sixty Years of Commonplace Life and Anarchist Agitation. Oakland: AK Press. ISBN 1-873176-93-7.
- Porcel, Baltasar (1978). La revuelta permanente (in Spanish). Barcelona: Editorial Planeta. ISBN 84-320-5643-X.
- Villar, Manuel (1994). El anarquismo en la insurrección de Asturias: la CNT y la FAI en octubre de 1934 (in Spanish). Madrid: Fundación Anselmo Lorenzo. ISBN 84-86864-15-1.
- Woodcock, George (2004). Anarchism: A History Of Libertarian Ideas And Movements. Broadview Press. ISBN 1-55111-629-4.
