= Colomer =

Colomer (Spanish pronunciation: [koloˈmeɾ], Eastern Catalan: [kuluˈme]) is a Spanish surname. Notable people with the surname include:

- André Colomer (1886–1931), French poet and anarchist
- Dámaso Ruiz-Jarabo Colomer (1949–2009), Spanish judge
- Edmon Colomer, Spanish conductor
- Eduardo Comín Colomer (1908–1975), Spanish writer and journalist
- Jordi Colomer (born 1962), Spanish artist
- José Colomer (1935–2013), Spanish field hockey player
- Josep Colomer, Spanish political scientist
- Juan J. Colomer (born 1966), Spanish composer
- Maria Josep Colomer i Luque (1913–2004), Catalan-Spanish pioneer female pilot
- Narciso Pascual Colomer (1808–1870), Spanish architect
- Raúl Martínez Colomer, Puerto Rican swimmer
