= Benito Pabón =

Spanish lawyer and politician (1895–1958)

Benito Pabón y Suárez de Urbina
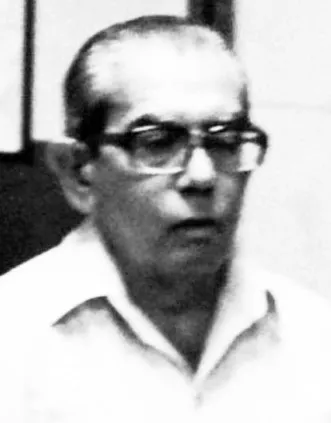
- Pabón c. 1958

Member of the Congress of Deputies
- In office 21 February 1936 – 2 February 1939
- President: Manuel Azaña
- Prime Minister: Francisco Largo Caballero (1936–1937), Juan Negrín (1937–1939)
- Parliamentary group: Popular Front
- Constituency: Zaragoza

General Secretary of Aragon
- In office 21 December 1936 – 10 August 1937
- President: Joaquín Ascaso

Personal details
- Born: 25 March 1895 Seville, Andalusia
- Died: 1958 (aged 62–63) Colón, Panama
- Citizenship: Spain
- Party: Syndicalist Party
- Other political affiliations: CNT
- Parents: Benito Pabón y Galindo (father); Teresa Suárez de Urbina y Cañaveral (mother)
- Occupation: Lawyer
- Profession: Labor law

Benito Pabón y Suárez de Urbina (25 March 1895 – 1958) was an Andalusian lawyer, trade unionist and member of the Congress of Deputies of Spain for the city of Zaragoza during the last legislature of the republican period. He was a lawyer of the workers and peasants of the CNT, later becoming part of the trentista current - first joining the Federal Democratic Republican Party and later the Syndicalist Party.

== Biography ==
Benito Pabón y Suárez de Urbina was born in Seville on 25 March 1895 into a wealthy family. His father, Benito Pabón y Galindo, was an Integrist, and his mother, Teresa Suárez de Urbina y Cañaveral, was a Carlist. His uncle José Ignacio Suárez de Urbina was a prominent Catholic publicist and leader of the Traditionalist Communion in Córdoba. In his youth, Benito was also a member of the Carlist cause and was part of the Jaimista Youth of Villanueva del Río. Benito later studied with the Jesuits and at the Law Institute of Seville, then went on to work as a labor lawyer in Granada, Zaragoza and Madrid.

=== Second Republic ===
During the time of the Second Spanish Republic, Pabón led the defense of various cases related to workers' causes. As a lawyer, he defended the farmers implicated in the Casas Viejas incident, (Note: Together with Manuel Blasco Garzón y José Monje Bernal.) as well as those jailed after the anarchist insurrection of January 1933.

In the 1936 Spanish general election he was elected deputy of Zaragoza, with 44,545 votes out of the 85,178 cast, running as an independent. (Note: Although some sources link his seat to the Syndicalist Party, Manuel Tuñón de Lara explicitly stated that he did not belong to the party and that Pestaña was the only syndicalist deputy elected in the 1936 elections, this was also supported by Eduardo Comín Colomer, who separated Pabón, whom he lists as an "independent trade unionist", from Pestaña's seat with the Syndicalist Party.) In parliament, on 3 July 1936 he responded to Angel Galarza (PSOE) in relation to the amnesty of political prisoners, arguing against the interpretation given to the Ley de vagos y maleantes:

[...] The concept that has been held in Spain regarding amnesty responded to the legal reality of not having the ley de vagos y maleantes, which is a shame really, because things are as they are and not as we want them to be, and although we persist in saying that the imprisonment of those declared socially dangerous is not a punishment - go and ask them or their children, it is a real punishment and a punishment that they are really suffering. But if there were no legal reason for what I intend there would be a practical reason: that of wanting to fulfill a promise of an electoral pact.

=== Civil War ===
On 18 July 1936, Pabón was in Madrid, integrating into the Harriers Column. He was later elected as General Secretary of the Regional Defense Council of Aragon and was a member of the Legal Commission of the Ministry of Justice under Joan García Oliver. As a defense lawyer of the Workers' Party of Marxist Unification (Catalan: Partit Obrer d'Unificació Marxista, POUM), (Note: Among which was, among others, Julián Gorkin, Encargado inicialmente de la defensa, abandonaría el caso, al sentirse amenazado por los comunistas, cuya prensa le habría etiquetado como «espía». Fue sustituido por Vicente Rodríguez Revilla.) he had to go into exile in August 1938, and commented on what happened in May 1937:

[...] this hegemony of the Communist Party means, and the facts show, the implantation of the political methods characteristic of Russia. The disappearance and assassination of Andreu Nin was an alarming and tragic symptom.

— Letter to the clandestine Executive Committee of the POUM.

=== Exile ===
After a short stay in France Pabón left for the Philippines. But when Japanese forces occupied Manila he was imprisoned in the military prison of Fuerte Santiago, from which he was released in the fall of 1942. He then left for Latin America, earning a living as a Spanish language teacher in Santiago de Veraguas and Colón, where he settled permanently after a stay in Mexico. He died in Panama in 1958.

== Bibliography ==
- Alba, Víctor; Schwartz, Stephen (2008). Spanish Marxism Versus Soviet Communism: A History of the P.O.U.M. in the Spanish Civil War. Transaction Publishers. ISBN 978-0-88738-198-0.
- Comín Colomer, Eduardo (1967). Historia del Partido Comunista de España (in Spanish). Vol. 3. Editora Nacional.
- Godicheau, François (2005). "El proceso del POUM: proceso ordinario de una justicia extraordinaria". Historia Contemporánea (in Spanish). 29. UPV: 839–869. ISSN 1130-2402.
- Gutiérrez Molina, José Luis (2015). "El crimen y los procesos de los Sucesos de Casas Viejas. Los campesinos y la insidia política". Cahiers de civilisation espagnole contemporaine (in Spanish) (2). doi:10.4000/ccec.5527. ISSN 1957-7761.
- Kelsey, Graham (1991). Anarchosyndicalism, Libertarian Communism and the State: The CNT in Zaragoza and Aragon, 1930-1937. Kluwe Academic Publishers. ISBN 0-7923-0275-3.
- Pasamar Alzuria, Gonzalo; Peiró Martín, Ignacio (2002). "Pabón y Suárez de Urbina, Jesús". Diccionario Akal de Historiadores españoles contemporáneos (in Spanish). Ediciones Akal. pp. 461–462. ISBN 84-460-1489-0.
- Pascual, Pedro (1986). Partidos politicos y constitucionales en España (in Spanish). Fragua, D.L. ISBN 8470740571.
- Peláez, Manuel J. (2000). "El diputado anarquista Benito Pabón y Suárez de Urbina (1ª parte)". Cuadernos Republicanos (in Spanish) (41). Cuadernos Republicanos: Centro de Investigación y Estudios Republicanos: 109–116. ISSN 1131-7744.
- Seco Serrano, Carlos (1999). "Prologue". Cambó: 1876-1947 (in Spanish). Barcelona: Editorial Alpha. ISBN 84-7225-740-1.
- Sierra, Gabriela; Gracia, Francisco (2012). Zaragoza en el Congreso de los Diputados. Parlamentarios durante la Segunda República (PDF) (in Spanish). Zaragoza: IFC. ISBN 978-84-9911-163-6.
- Tuñón de Lara, Manuel (1976). La II República (in Spanish). Vol. 2. Siglo XXI de España. ISBN 8432300756.
