= Bolshevik triennium =

Period between 1918 and 1920 in Spain

The Bolshevik triennium is the name given by Spanish historiography, in reference to the influence of the Russian Revolution of 1917 and the Bolshevik revolutionaries, to the period between 1918 and 1920 (or 1921), a period characterized by a high level of social conflict in the context of the crisis of the Restoration.

Used from the study published in 1929 by Juan Díaz del Moral, who used the expression "Bolshevist triennium", the denomination is usually used in a restricted way to refer to the revolts, demonstrations, assassinations and strikes that took place in the southern half of Spain, especially in the Andalusian countryside: the expectations aroused by the news that arrived from the Russian revolution in the impoverished masses were felt, depending on the local context, in urban or rural movements.

== Context ==
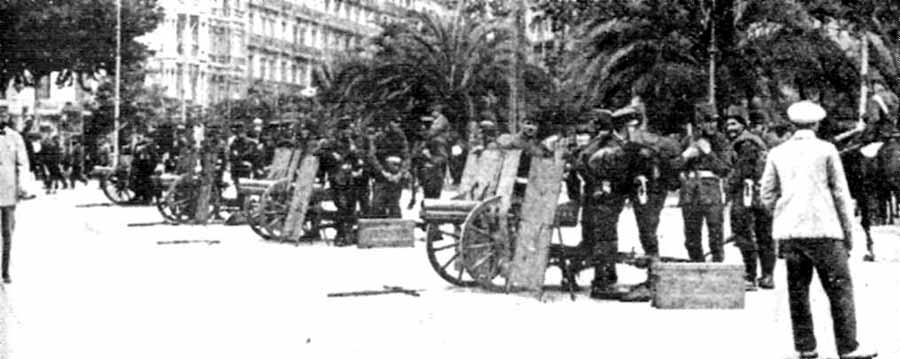
Spanish artillery in Plaza Cataluña, Barcelona, during the 1917 strike.

Since the crisis of 1917, the worsening of the precarious situation of the workers, both in the countryside (landless day laborers) and in the factories (industrial proletariat) was unsustainable (decrease in production, increase in unemployment, decrease in real wages as prices increased, etc.). The response of the dynastic parties (the only ones with real possibilities of being in power in the turnist system to what was still known as the social question included measures similar to those which in the most advanced countries (such as Germany) had initiated the so-called social state, but of very limited scope. The ineffectiveness of the Social Reforms Commission had given way to the more active but insufficient programs of a set of institutions with a regenerationist spirit: the Institute of Social Reforms (1903), the National Welfare Institute (1908) and the Ministry of Labor (1920). The government of the Count of Romanones (December 1918 - April 1919) was characterized by reacting to social discontent with measures such as the introduction of the public pension system through the so-called Workers' Retirement and the eight-hour working day (3 April 1919, not applied until 23 September). The Sunday Rest Law, of the government of Antonio Maura, had come into force in 1907.

== Reorganization of the workers' movement ==
There was a notable increase in union membership. The main demands of the workers centered on wage increases and the reduction of the working day. The predominant ideologies in the Spanish workers' movement were anarchist (CNT union, opposed to participation in the political system) and Marxist (UGT union, linked to the socialist party -PSOE-), with different territorial implementation (anarchist predominance in Catalonia and Andalusia, socialist predominance in the Basque Country and Madrid). The impact of the Russian Revolution of 1917 was very important. Initially even the Bolshevik or October Revolution enjoyed the sympathy of both tendencies, which sent observers. It was not until several years later that the alignment of each organization was clarified. The CNT was present in the Comintern or Third International from 10 December 1919, until Ángel Pestaña's report in 1922. The participation of the PSOE in the re-foundation of the Socialist International together with the parties of social democratic orientation (the so-called second and middle international -Fernando de los Ríos had recommended not to link up with the Bolsheviks-) provoked the split of the Spanish Socialist Workers Party, to create the Communist Party of Spain (November 1921), all of them minority groups.

== Peasant revolts in southern Spain ==
In peasant areas of Andalusia, La Mancha and Extremadura, where workers' mobilizations had remained at a low level since the great movements of 1903–1904, there was a strong process of politicization of the day laborers, who massively joined the unions (a total of 100,854 affiliated to the Andalusian Regional Confederation of the CNT in December 1919, 23,900 affiliations of agricultural workers to the UGT between October 1918 and July 1919), which initially obtained certain concessions (recognition of the unions and of wage bargaining, abolition of piecework). Between the autumn of 1918 and the summer of 1919 the maximum level of mobilizations was reached, with numerous strikes, such as the general strike in the province of Cordoba called by the Castro del Rio congress (October 1918) and the second general strike, in March 1919, which spread throughout Andalusia. At that time the mobilizations were radicalized through movements for the occupation of land with the intention of distributing the ownership of the properties (among the slogans spread were "unity makes strength" and "land for those who work it"), burning of crops, occupation of the town halls, etc. The fear that spread among landowners and employers provoked their withdrawal to the big cities, at the same time that wage increases were accepted (Díaz del Moral estimated a nominal increase of 150% between 1917 and 1921, although based on data on harvest wages that cannot be generalized). From May 1919 onwards, the mobilizations of day laborers were harshly repressed, and a state of war was declared. The workers' societies were outlawed and their leaders imprisoned. The Andalusian workers' movement began a phase of decline, and union membership decreased.

== Simultaneous processes ==
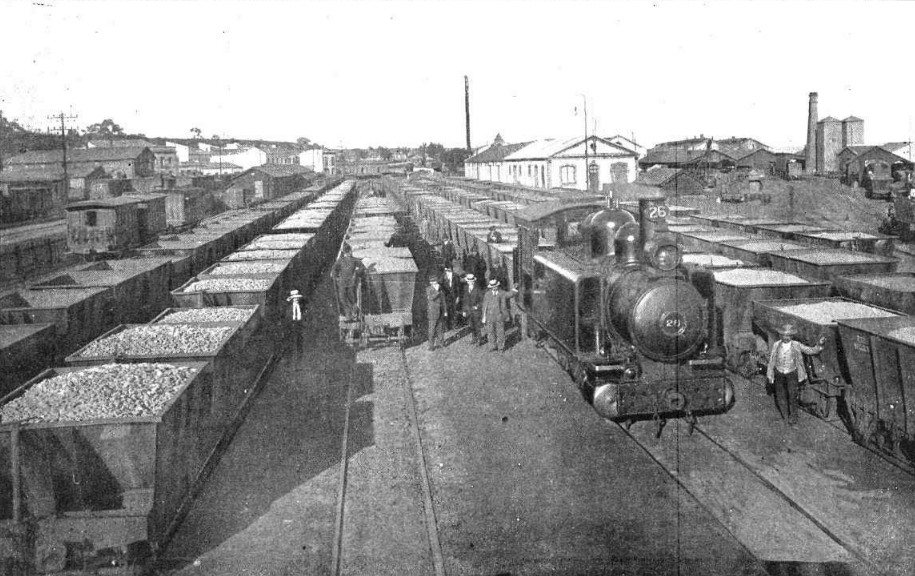
A view of the Riotinto railway complex during the 1920 strike, with the miners' trains paralyzed.

During 1920 other workers' struggles also took place in southern Spain. In the province of Huelva, an important strike movement paralyzed the Riotinto-Nerva mining basin, and quickly spread to other parts of the province, with the generalization of work stoppages and significant conflict. The Riotinto strike reached an extraordinary level of severity and had a strong media impact in the rest of Spain. Also during that year there was another large strike movement by the miners of the Peñarroya-Belmez-Espiel coal basin, in the north of the province of Cordoba.

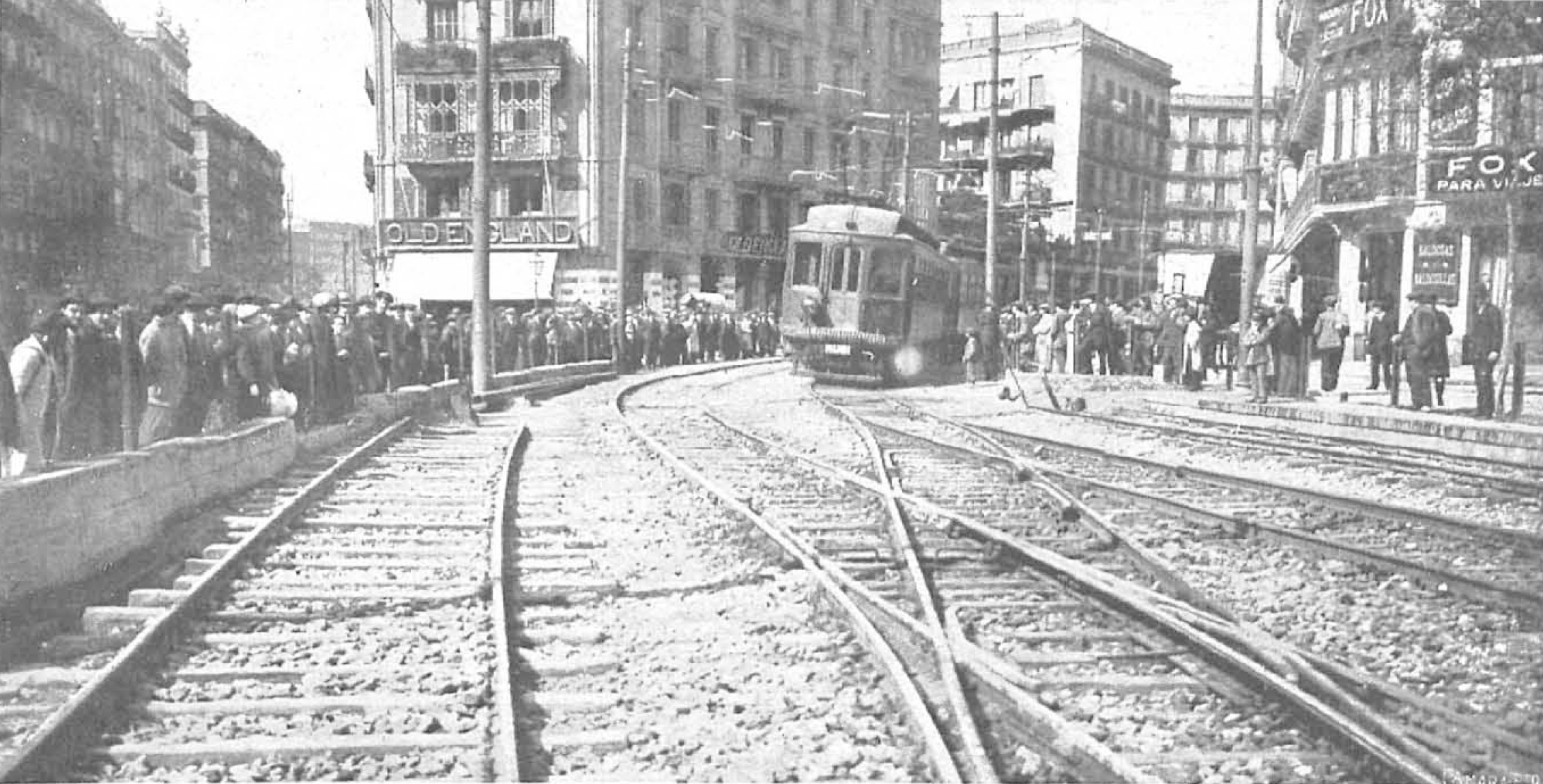
Barcelona strikers watch the train Sarrià-Rubí maneuvering during the La Canadiense strike, Nuevo Mundo, 14 March 1920.

The city of Barcelona experienced a period of extraordinary violence, with an escalation of attacks by armed groups (pistolerismo) related to employers and workers, and a policy of harsh repression against them by Governor Severiano Martínez Anido. To the so-called military problem and the growing difficulties of the colonization of Morocco, which culminated in the disaster of Annual (22 July 1921), corresponded, from the workers' movement, a historical opposition to militarism (such as that which had been the protagonist of the Tragic Week of 1909). The political crisis that opened up after Annual led to the coup d'état of General Primo de Rivera (13 September 1923) and the subsequent period of dictatorship.

== Bibliography ==
- Ferrero Blanco, María Dolores (2003). "La huelga minera de Río Tinto de 1920. El diagnóstico del conflicto según Sir Rhys Williams, enviado de los Rostschild" (PDF). Revista de estudios regionales (in Spanish) (67). Universidades Públicas de Andalucía: 247–305. ISSN 0213-7585.
- García Parody, Manuel Ángel (2009). El Germinal del sur: conflictos mineros en el Alto Guadiato, 1881-1936 (in Spanish). Sevilla: Centro de Estudios Andaluces.
