= Mañana (newspaper) =

Mañana promotion poster

Mañana (meaning Morning in Spanish) was the regional mouthpiece of the Catalan Federation of the Syndicalist Party in Catalonia, Spain. It was published daily from Barcelona. The paper was published between 1937 and 1939. Together with El Sindicalista, it was the most prominent publication of the party. It was printed at the printing shop that had previously issued El Correo Catalán.

Ángel Pestaña was the director of the newspaper. On November 28, 1937 Marín Civera replaced Pestaña as the director of the daily.
