= 1917 Spanish general strike =

- Part of the Spanish crisis of 1917 and the Revolutions of 1917–1923
- Date: 13–18 August 1917
- Location: Spain
- Caused by: Deterioration in living conditions
- Goals: Regime change
- Methods: General strike
- Result: Strike suppressed

Parties
| UGT; PSOE; CNT | (Restoration (Spain)) Government: Conservative Party; Armed Forces; Defense Councils |

Lead figures
| Francisco Largo Caballero; Daniel Anguiano; Julián Besteiro; Andrés Saborit; Francisco Miranda; Ángel Pestaña; Salvador Seguí | Alfonso XIII (Restoration (Spain)) Eduardo Dato (Restoration (Spain)) Fernando Primo de Rivera; Benito Márquez |

Casualties
- Deaths: 71
- Injuries: 156
- Detained: 2,000

The 1917 Spanish general strike, or revolutionary general strike of 1917, took place in Spain in August 1917. It was called by the General Union of Workers (UGT) and the Spanish Socialist Workers' Party (PSOE), and in some places it was supported by the National Confederation of Labor (CNT). The general strike took place in the historical context of the Crisis of 1917, during the reign of Alfonso XIII and the government of Eduardo Dato.

== Background ==
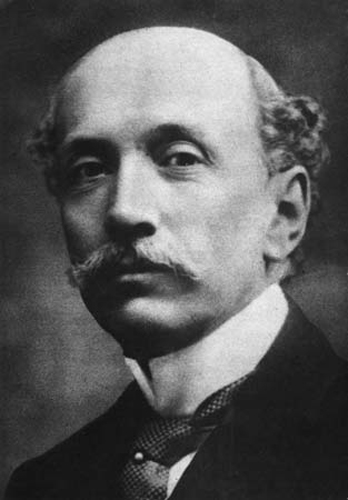
Eduardo Dato, the Prime minister of Spain during the crisis of 1917

The Spanish crisis of 1917 refers to the set of events that took place in the summer of 1917, and specifically to the three simultaneous challenges that endangered the government of the conservative Eduardo Dato and even the system of the Restoration: a military movement led by the Defense Councils; a political movement concretized in the Assembly of Parliamentarians held in Barcelona and called by the Regionalist League; and a social movement that culminated in the revolutionary general strike of 1917.

The anarcho-syndicalist National Confederation of Labor (Spanish: Confederación Nacional del Trabajo, CNT) had been defending the possibility of convening a general strike to confront the growing deterioration in the living conditions of the working classes, as a consequence of the economic impact that World War I was having on Spain: inflation, subsistence crisis, deterioration of wages, increase in unemployment, supply shortages, etc. In 1916 this objective was specified in the Valencia Assembly and in the Barcelona Confederal Congress that summer.

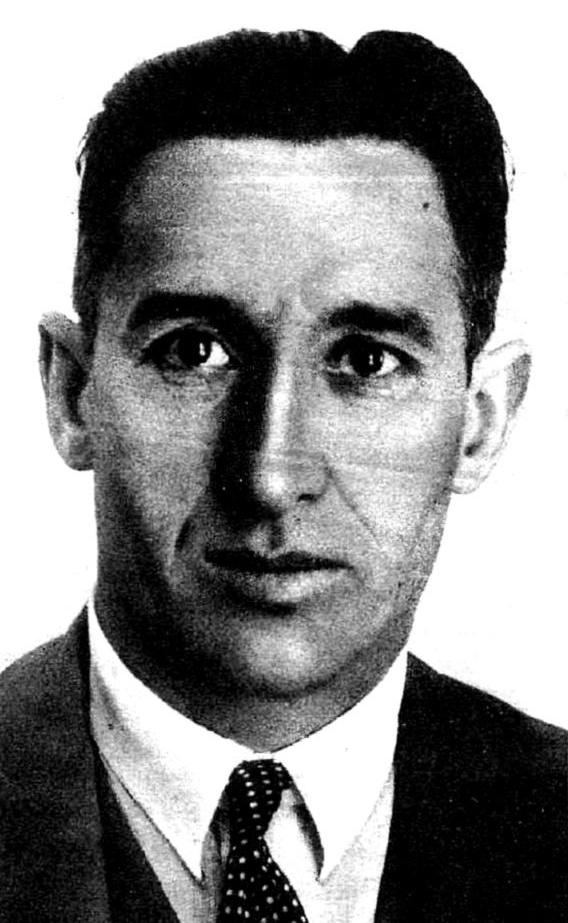
Ángel Pestaña, one of the leaders of the CNT during the 1917 general strike

A similar process was experienced by the socialist General Union of Workers (Spanish: Unión General de Trabajadores, UGT), which in its XII Congress held in May 1916 passed a resolution in favor of calling a general protest strike, in principle limited to one day. This is how contacts with the CNT began, which in its Valencia Assembly of the same month had not only approved the general strike but also the collaboration with the Socialists. The result was the historic "Pact of Zaragoza" signed on 17 July 1916 by both organizations, from which a joint committee was formed, made up of Ángel Pestaña and Salvador Seguí for the CNT, and Francisco Largo Caballero, Julián Besteiro and Vicente Barrio for the UGT that would organize the protest strike. The government of Álvaro de Figueroa ordered the arrest of the signatories of the Pact. Finally, on 26 November, the CNT and UGT called a 24-hour general strike for 18 December.

The strike was not only a complete success but also "had the support of the middle classes and a general sympathy in the country." Two days earlier, the socialist leader Largo Caballero had written:

All of Spain knows that conscientious workers have been demanding measures to mitigate somewhat the irresistible situation created by the rising cost of basic necessities and the job crisis for more than two years. There have been no more than words and words.

After the success of the December 1916 strike and the null response of the Government, the two workers' organizations agreed to promote an indefinite strike, which they made public in a joint manifesto on 27 March 1917. The response of Figueroa's liberal government was to suspend constitutional guarantees and imprison the signatories of the manifesto that they could find, who were detained for a week. In the manifesto signed, among others, by the UGT members Julián Besteiro and Francisco Largo Caballero, and the CNT members Salvador Seguí and Ángel Pestaña, among other things, it said:

In order to force the ruling classes to make those fundamental changes in the system that guarantee the people a minimum of decent living conditions and the development of their emancipatory activities, it is imposed that the Spanish proletariat employ the general strike, without a defined term of termination, as the most powerful weapon you have to claim your rights.

Thus, the new general strike, this time indefinite, was to have a revolutionary character since its objective was no longer limited to the government taking measures to alleviate the subsistence crisis and the "labor crisis", but rather pursued "a complete transformation of the political and economic structure of the country", as explained by Largo Caballero in an article published on 5 May in El Liberal. This revolutionary character led the Socialists to seek the support of the leaders of the republican parties, like Alejandro Lerroux and Melquiades Álvarez, especially after disgruntled soldiers formed the Defense Councils in June and the Assembly of Parliamentarians was convened in Barcelona in July. It was then that the CNT began to distrust the "political" character that was being given to the strike and the contacts that the socialists had maintained with the "bourgeois politicians"—a de facto reproduction, alleged the CNT members, of the republican conjunction which had brought Pablo Iglesias to the Congress of Deputies.

According to some non-verified sources, there was talk of the constitution of a provisional government, which would have had the more moderate figure of Melquiades Álvarez as president and Pablo Iglesias as Minister of Labor. And on the other hand, the dissemination of the strike call included some ambiguity, because if at first they spoke of a "revolutionary" strike, later communications insisted on its "peaceful" nature. Above all, the UGT consciously tried to avoid partial, sectoral and local strikes.

== The strike ==
=== Convocation ===
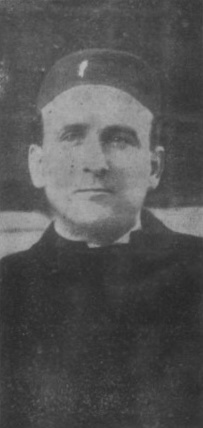
Francisco Largo Caballero, one of the leaders of the UGT during the 1917 general strike

The plans for the general strike were altered when on 19 July 1917, coinciding with the Assembly of Parliamentarians meeting in Barcelona, a strike by the Valencian railroad workers, affiliated to the UGT, began due to a labor dispute that they maintained with the Company of the Iron Roads of Northern Spain. In the negotiations, the company refused to reinstate the 36 workers who had been fired, an inflexible position that had the decided support of the Government—on 21 July, the Captain General of Valencia had declared a state of exception. The answer was given by the UGT Railway Federation, whose secretary Daniel Anguiano announced that if the company did not give in, a strike would begin in the entire sector on 10 August—even though Anguiano was aware of no conflict prior to the general strike, but pressure from its members forced him to do so. The company did not back down, so the leadership of the UGT was involved in a difficult situation since, on the one hand, it could not leave the railway workers abandoned, but, on the other hand, "to go to the Revolutionary movement without being prepared was to go to the certain failure", as one socialist leader later affirmed. Finally, the socialist strike committee—made up of Francisco Largo Caballero and Daniel Anguiano for the UGT and Julián Besteiro and Andrés Saborit for the PSOE—decided to declare a general strike on Monday 13 August, three days after the rail strike began on 10 August.

Thus, finally the revolutionary general strike was only called by the UGT jointly with the PSOE when forced by the strike of the UGT railway union in Valencia, called for internal labor reasons, which precipitated the sum of the other sections of the union throughout the country between the 10 and 13 August.

When the UGT and the PSOE convened it jointly, the objective was not exactly the same as that agreed in March with the CNT, since in the manifesto "To the workers and to public opinion" of 12 August 1917—signed by the Socialist Strike Committee—it was said that the strike would not cease "until sufficient guarantees had been obtained to initiate regime change". In the introduction, the manifesto linked the call for a strike to the appearance of the Defense Councils, which the Socialists believed were defending the reform of the political regime of the Restoration, and the meeting of the Assembly of Parliamentarians in Barcelona.

During the time that has elapsed from this date [March 1917] to the present time, the affirmation made by the proletariat to demand, as a remedy for the ills suffered by Spain, a fundamental change of political regime has been corroborated by the attitude that important national organizations have successively adopted since the energetic affirmation of the existence of the Infantry Weapon Defense Councils in the face of the attempts to dissolve these organizations by the public powers, to the Assembly of Parliamentarians held in Barcelona on 19 July and the adherence to the conclusions of that Assembly of numerous City Councils, which give public testimony of the desire for renewal that exists throughout the country.

And the manifesto concluded:

We ask for a provisional government that assumes the executive and moderating powers and prepares, prior to the essential modifications in a flawed legislation, the holding of sincere elections of some Constituent Courts.

At the time, practically everyone thought that the railroad strike that forced the Socialists to advance their plans over the general strike—and that it would be one of the key factors in its failure—was deliberately caused by the government. This was believed by "not only all socialists but people as heterogeneous as Francisco Cambó, Alejandro Lerroux, Benito Márquez, president of the Defense Councils, or Julio Mangada, defender after some of those implicated as collaborators of the Strike Committee, to give some examples." At present some historians affirm the same: that the government of Eduardo Dato "opted for a risky maneuver. The plan consisted of provoking the labor movement to go on an untimely strike that would scare the classes of order and use the Army to suppress the disturbances. Thus, the Government could proclaim itself the savior of Spain and the guarantor of law and order."

=== Development ===
Despite the hasty call, when the strike began, activities were paralyzed in almost all the large industrial areas (Vizcaya and Barcelona, even some minor ones such as Yecla and Villena), urban centers (Madrid, Valencia, Zaragoza, A Coruña), and mining companies (Río Tinto, Jaén, Asturias and León); but only for a few days, at most a week. In small towns and rural areas, it had little impact. Rail communications, a key sector, were not altered for long.

On the morning of 13 August, a train derailed in Bilbao, causing 5 deaths and 18 injuries. The newspaper El Nervión and the authorities reported that the strikers raised the tracks causing the accident. But according to the Socialists, as Prieto later declared, the derailing was due to poor track conditions and the excessive speed of the train to avoid being stopped by the strikers.

In Madrid, on the night of Tuesday, 14 August, the Strike Committee was detained by the police and a riot that took place in the model prison was harshly repressed, resulting in the death of several inmates, including seven prominent socialist militants. This is how in a few days the strike was controlled. In Barcelona, on the other hand, where the leading role belonged to the CNT, only after several days of street fighting and shootings was it possible to restore normality. In Sabadell the army had to resort to artillery, which reduced the workers' headquarters to rubble, to put an end to the movement. There were also violent clashes and deaths and injuries in Alicante, Valencia, Guipúzcoa and Zaragoza. On 18 August, the government was able to proclaim that it had restored order, but it still took several more days to reduce the last stronghold of the revolutionary strike, which were the Asturian mining basins, where the army applied a harsh repression through the so-called train of death, among others.

In Catalonia some anarchists used artisan grenades, which did not work properly, to the fortune of the forces of order.

The official balance of the repression was 71 dead, 156 injured, and 2,000 detained.

There were also some deaths among the forces of order, including four Civil Guards.

== Consequences ==
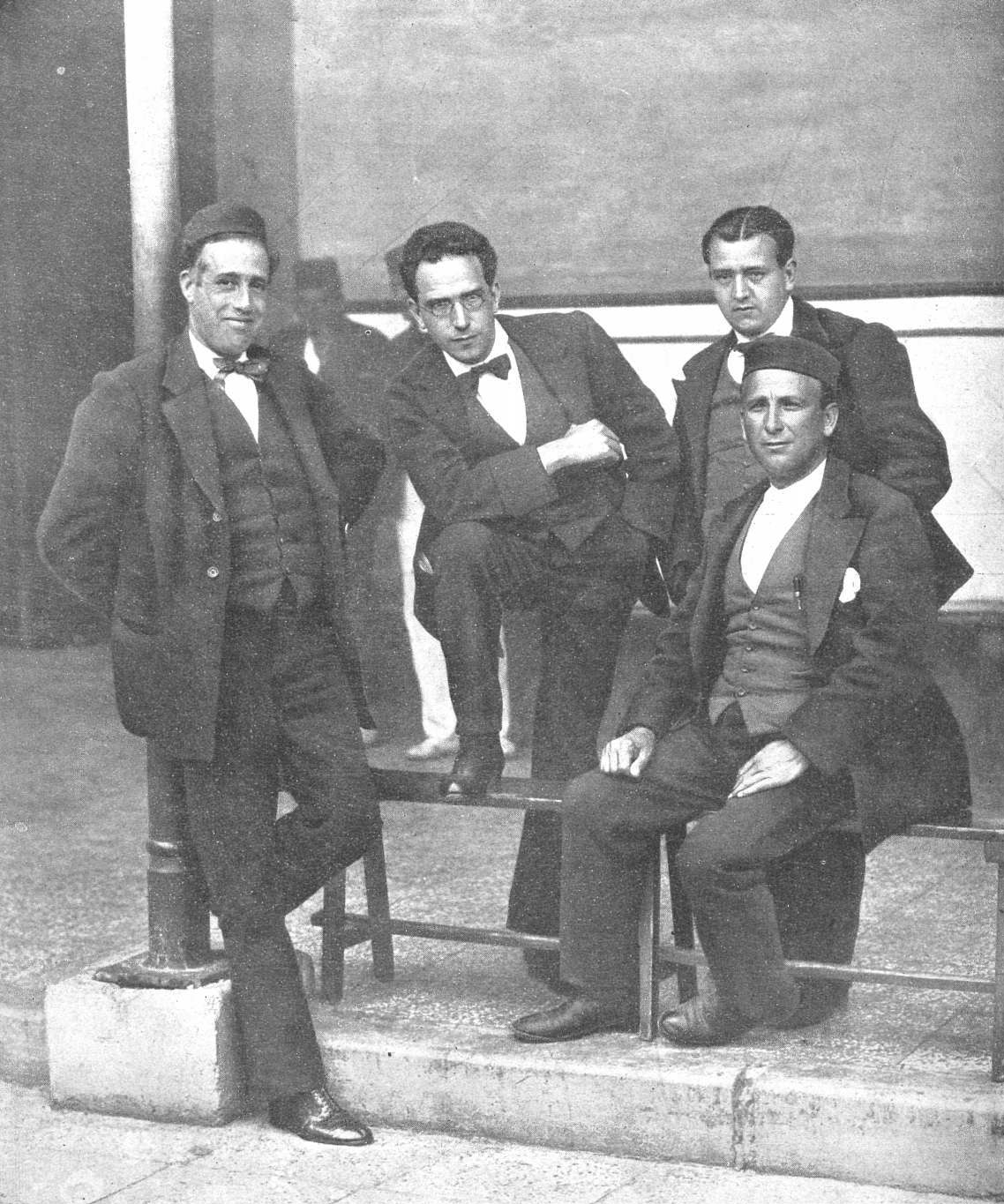
Julián Besteiro, Daniel Anguiano, Andrés Saborit and Francisco Largo Caballero in the Cartagena prison, photographed by Campúa (1918)

To facilitate the way out of the crisis, the king replaced the conservative Eduardo Dato with the liberal Manuel García Prieto, at the head of a government of national concentration in which Francesc Cambó also entered.

The members of the Strike Committee were court-martialed accused of the crime of sedition, being found guilty and sentenced to life imprisonment on 29 September 1917. Thus, Largo Caballero, Andrés Saborit, Julián Besteiro and Daniel Anguiano were taken to the Cartagena prison. Then a broad popular campaign of solidarity with the condemned was unleashed, which did not obtain any results, until the PSOE included them in its lists of candidates for the 1918 general election, and the four were elected, together with Pablo Iglesias and Indalecio Prieto, also elected by the Left Alliance coalition, formed the socialist minority of the Congress of Deputies. The election as deputies forced the government to grant them amnesty on 8 May 1918, taking possession of their seats ten days later.

The presence in the Cortes of the four members of the Strike Committee allowed them to intervene in the parliamentary debate on the general strike, insisting on the reasons that had originated the conflict—the subsistence crisis, the labor crisis and the null response they had found in the government—and denouncing the extreme harshness that had been used to repress it.

The strike was also the subject of debate during the XIII Congress of the UGT held in October 1918. Indalecio Prieto affirmed that "the strike failed the moment the committee decreed that it be peaceful", and that if it was not going to be done "revolutionary" it would have been better not to do so, to which Largo Caballero, a member of the strike committee, replied: "We are accused of not having properly prepared a revolutionary movement when what we had been commissioned to prepare was a general strike."

== Bibliography ==
- Aróstegui, Julio (2013). Largo Caballero. El tesón y la quimera. Barcelona: Debate. ISBN 978-84-8306-923-3.
- Erice Sebares, Francisco (2017). "El impacto de la Revolución Rusa en el movimiento obrero español: el surgimiento del PCE". In Andrade, Juan; Hernández Sánchez, Fernando (eds.). 1917: la Revolución Rusa cien años después. Madrid: Ediciones AKAL. ISBN 978-84-460-4479-6. OCLC 1027150169.
- García Queipo de Llano, Genoveva (1997). El reinado de Alfonso XIII. La modernización fallida. Madrid: Historia 16. ISBN 84-7679-318-9.
- García Piñeiro, Ramón (27 September 2017) [July 2017]. "Asturias 1917, nace la leyenda". Atlántica XXII (Nº 51). Oviedo: Letras Atlánticas D.L. OCLC 1139015111. Archived from the original on 23 October 2017.
- Ruiz González, David (1987). "La crisis de 1917". In Tuñón de Lara, Manuel; Tortella Casares, Gabriel (eds.). Revolución burguesa, oligarquía y constitucionalismo (1834-1923). Historia de España. Vol. 8 (2 ed.). Barcelona: Ed. Labor. ISBN 8433594281. OCLC 255078984.
- Juliá, Santos (2009). La Constitución de 1931. Madrid: Iustel. ISBN 978-84-9890-083-5.
- Suárez Cortina, Manuel (2006). La España Liberal (1868-1917). Política y sociedad. Madrid: Síntesis.
- Silva, Lorenzo (2018) [2017]. Sereno en el peligro: la aventura histórica de la Guardia Civil. Madrid: Edaf. ISBN 978-84-414-3808-8.
- Urquijo Goitia, Mikel (1988). "La huelga de Agosto de 1917 en Vizcaya" (PDF). Vasconia: Cuadernos de historia-geografía (10). San Sebastián: Eusko Ikaskuntza. ISSN 1136-6834. OCLC 807503984.
