= General Strike of 1917 =

The General Strike of 1917 can refer to:

- the Australian General Strike of 1917
- the Spanish General Strike of 1917
- the Finnish General Strike of 1917
