= Treintismo =

Spanish libertarian socialist movement

Treintismo (English: Thirtyism) was a libertarian socialist political movement in the Second Spanish Republic. Initially a faction within the National Confederation of Labour (CNT), the treintistas were, after the publication of the Manifesto of the Thirty in September 1931, expelled from the CNT over the course of the years 1931 and 1932 and formed the Syndicalist Party in 1932. The treintistas and the trade unions associated with them, the Opposition Syndicates, rejoined the CNT in 1936. The movement fell into political irrelevance with the victory of the Nationalist forces of Francisco Franco in the Spanish Civil War.

The name is derived from the Spanish word for the number 30, treinta.

== Ideology ==
The "Manifesto of the Thirty" about the threat of immediate revolution

This concept of revolution, the son of the purest demagoguery, sponsored for dozens of years by all the political parties that have tried and succeeded many times to assault power, has, although it seems paradoxical, defenders in our media and has been reaffirmed in certain nuclei of militants. Without realizing it, they fall into all the vices of political demagogy, into vices that would lead us to give away the revolution.

The formation of the Federación Anarquista Ibérica (FAI) in 1927 brought a new wave of hardline anarchist influence into the CNT. The FAI advocated for the immediate overthrow of the political system and was strictly anti-electoralist.

Treintismo formed in ideological opposition to the hardline positions advocated by the FAI. The treintistas protested the growing disruptive influence of the FAI radicals in the CNT, and advocate a more moderate approach to the establishment of anarchism. The treintistas were sympathetic to syndicalistic forms of government, which was in turn rejected by the FAI anarchist purists. The treintistas advocated the establishment of powerful nationwide industrial labor unions, which was rejected by the FAI.

In the adoption of the Manifesto of the Thirty es, via WikiSource], the treintistas warned that a rushed revolutionary attempt or a failure by the anarchists to participate in the newborn Spanish Republic, which was called a historic turnabout in Spanish history, could ultimately lead to the birth of a Republican fascism.

== History ==
=== Split from the CNT and formation of the Syndicalist Party ===
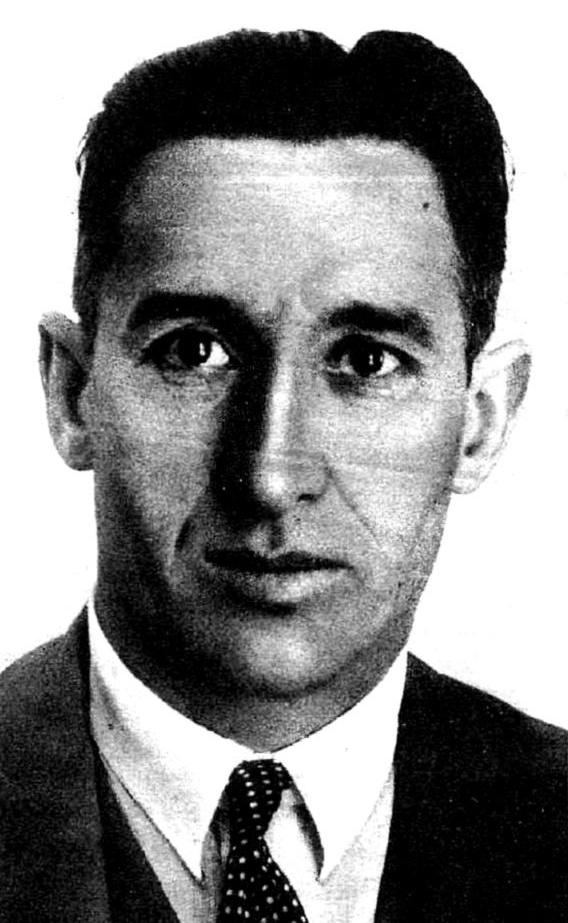
Ángel Pestaña

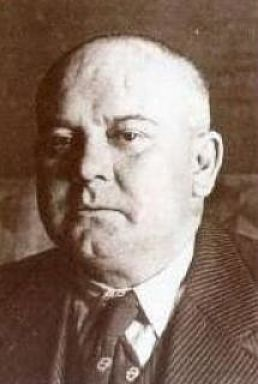
Joan Peiró

On 1 September 1931, thirty moderate CNT leaders (Note: Juan López, Agustín Gibanel, Ricard Fornells, José Girona, Daniel Navarro, Jesús Rodríguez, Antonio Villabriga, Ángel Pestaña, Miguel Portolés, Joaquim Roura, Joaquim Lorente, Progreso Alfarache, Antonio Peñarroya, Camilo Piñón, Joaquín Cortes, Isidoro Gabín, Pedro Massoni, Francesc Arín, José Cristiá, Juan Dinarés, Roldán Cortada, Sebastià Clara, Joan Peiró, Ramon Viñas, Federico Uleda, Pere Cané, Mariano Peat, Espartaco Puig, Narciso Marcó, Jenaro Minguet.) signed the Manifesto of the Thirty in protest against the growing influence of the radical FAI within the ranks of the CNT. The FAI advocated a radical and purist anarchism and rejected any notions of reformism or cooperation with the statist system, even of the newly founded Second Spanish Republic. Within the anarchist movement, the FAI with its advocacy of simplistic revolution thus represented a radical faction of anarchism, which some more moderate elements in the CNT trade union network disagreed with.

After the signing of the Manifesto of the Thirty, to whose principal signers belonged Ángel Pestaña, Joan Peiró and Juan López Sánchez, the unions that supported the moderate signatories were systematically expelled from the CNT network on pressure of the FAI-aligned radical purists. The trade unions in question then formed the Opposition Syndicates (Spanish: Sindicatos de Oposición), representing a split in the anarchist and syndicalist trade union movement that was not healed until May 1936. The expulsion of the treintistas and moderate syndicalists prevented the CNT for several years from forming national industrial unions, which had been favored by the moderates. Instead, the CNT opted for localistic and subnational models favored by the FAI purist hardliners.

Ángel Pestaña then went on to become the leading founder of the Syndicalist Party (Spanish: Partido Sindicalista). The anarchist and syndicalist movements thus continued in two different directions, as the CNT came increasingly under FAI dominance of anarchist purism, whereas a significant amount of the more moderate syndicalists coalesced around the treintistas and the Syndicalist Party.

=== Activity of the Alianza Obrera and the Popular Front ===
Geographically, Treintism was strongest in the cities of Valencia and Alicante in the east and the city of Huelva in the southwest, but also represented a significant minority in Barcelona, where it broke the pattern of CNT dominance of the local anarchist and syndicalist movements especially among the metallurgy workers. By contrast, the mainline CNT was powerful with non-metallurgy workers in Barcelona, and had significant power bases in Catalonia, Galicia, and Aragon. Both movements were weak in the Province of León, Old Castile (with the exception of minority support in Logroño), Extremadura, New Castile (with the exception of minority support in Madrid), and the Basque Country (with the exception of minority support in Álava).

After the electoral victory of the right-wing CEDA in the 1933 Spanish general election, the moderate and reformist elements in the anarchist and syndicalist movements began even stronger advocacy for participation in electoralism. The Workers' and Peasants' Block, one of the predecessors of the later Workers' Party of Marxist Unification (POUM), was the first to suggest a unified workers' alliance of all trade union groups and labor-based parties. This group came to be known as the Workers' Alliance (Spanish: Alianza Obrera) and was formed in Barcelona on 9 December 1933. The Workers' Alliance included the Workers' and Peasants' Block, the treintistas (in form of the Opposition Syndicates), and the General Union of Workers (UGT), as well as several other political parties and sharecroppers' associations. The radical elements of the CNT only participated in the alliance in the region of Asturias. The Workers' Alliance made the advance of social revolution and anti-fascism some of its principal declared goals. It began to organize strikes across many cities in March 1934, but the strike action sowed discontent among several parts of the Workers' Alliance, as the sharecroppers found the action too severe, whereas the treintistas saw it as too narrow.

As the year 1935 went on, the ideological switch in the Communist International away from the social fascism doctrine also allowed the Communist Party of Spain (PCE) to participate in such electoral alliances. The general electoral coalition of the Spanish centrist republicans, moderate socialists, Marxist-Leninist communists and the Treintist anarchists became known as the Popular Front.

The 1936 Spanish general election ended in a close victory for the Popular Front, helped largely by the CNT's decision to not call upon its members to abstain as they had done in 1933. Although the CNT did not itself run in the election, it moved away from its traditional strong anti-electoralism and thus encouraged each member to make their own decision on whether or not to vote in the election. The anarchist turnout was sufficiently high to likely have decided the 1936 election in favor of the Popular Front.

=== Reunification with the CNT ===
In May 1936, the Opposition Syndicates were readmitted into the CNT in a general congress of the organization at Zaragoza. After the reunification of the CNT, Juan López Sánchez became once again the most important CNT-affiliated leader in the Valencia area. Treintista influence in Valencia would prove locally important during the growth of Comintern influence over PSOE and PCE, as more and more CNT elements dissented against the strengthening of Stalinist influence in the rest of anarchist Spain.

=== Spanish Civil War ===
The breakout of the Spanish Civil War after the military uprising of the Nationalist faction around Francisco Franco forced the CNT into an uneasy alliance with the Republican faction. On 3 November 1936, the CNT decided for the first time to take a role in statist politics in the Second Spanish Republic, and accepted the invitation into the government of Francisco Largo Caballero. Negotiations had begun in early September, and the anarchist movement was, on the backdrop of the civil war, largely in favor of joining the Republican government. The old split between treintistas and FAI purists within the reunified CNT remained visible, as two members of each side were named to join the cabinet; Juan López Sánchez and Joan Peiró were named from among the moderates, whereas Juan García Oliver and Federica Montseny were selected from among the hardliners. The two moderates were immediately willing to assume their posts, whereas the two radicals, keeping with their anti-electoralist principles, were much harder to convince. Joan Peiró was named Minister of Industry, whereas Juan López Sánchez became Minister of Commerce. During his time as Minister of Commerce, Juan López Sánchez used his position to attempt to supply the anarchist communes in Catalonia with much-needed imports from abroad to alleviate resource shortages.

May 1937 brought the May Days to Barcelona, when communist and socialist forces aligned with PCE and UGT clashed with the anarchists and syndicalists of CNT and FAI. This "civil war within the Civil War", which lasted until the CNT called off the hostilities on 8 May, was a resurfacing of the deep divisions that continued to exist in the Republican coalition. What followed was the elimination, brought about by Soviet-inspired pressure by communist and socialist factions, of the anarchist and syndicalist factions from the governments of both the Spanish Republic and Catalonia. The May Days also brought about to downfall of Francisco Largo Caballero, the Republican politician who had championed the acceptance of the anarchists and syndicalists into the government in the first place and who had now become, in the eyes of the increasingly dominant PCE and their Soviet overlords, a liability.

After September 1938, when the Munich Agreement regarding Czechoslovakia demonstrated the unwillingness of the United Kingdom and France, both of whom were largely neutral in the Civil War, to oppose Fascist Italy and Nazi Germany, both of whom had intervened on behalf of Franco's Nationalists, the involvement of the Soviet Union, the largest foreign supporter of the Republican side, began to be scaled back. The Soviet Union had itself always been hostile to the anarchists (including the Treintist faction), as well as the POUM, and had instead favored the pro-Stalinist PCE, but gradual Soviet withdrawal nonetheless signalled the imminent defeat of the Republicans.

=== The End of Treintismo ===
The brief cooperation of CNT-aligned forces with the National Defence Council, which overthrew Juan Negrín, did and could not prevent the Nationalist victory in the Spanish Civil War. On 9 February 1939, Francisco Franco proclaimed on behalf of the Nationalist government the adoption of the Law of Political Responsibilities, which declared guilty the leaders and supporters of the Republican movement and banned their organizations, including the CNT. While the CNT continued in exile, Treintismo vanished as a relevant political force.

== See also ==
- 1933 Spanish general election
- 1936 Spanish general election
- Confederación Nacional del Trabajo
- Federación Anarquista Ibérica
- Nationalist faction (Spanish Civil War)
- Republican faction (Spanish Civil War)
- Second Spanish Republic
- Spanish Civil War
