= El Pueblo (Spanish newspaper) =

Daily newspaper for the Spanish Syndicalist political party

El Pueblo poster

El Pueblo (The People) was a Spanish daily newspaper, the central organ of the Syndicalist Party during the 1930s. The paper had its headquarters in Valencia.

It had a moderate republican political stance.
