= Defence Juntas =

Spanish military officer associations (1916–17)

The Defence Juntas (Spanish: Juntas de Defensa) were professional associations of military officers that sprouted in Spain during the last rales of the Restoration. They were created from 1916 onward by Army officers based in Peninsular Spain disgruntled because of the comparatively quicker war-merit-based promotion of the army officers posted in Africa, underpinning the africanistas vs junteros polarization within the armed forces. Jointly with the 1917 general strike and the meetings of the so-called Assembly of Parliamentarians in Barcelona, the unrest stirred by the wayward juntas (which refused to disband after an order to do so issued by the government of García Prieto in the Summer of 1917) destabilized the regime during the Crisis of 1917.
