= Francesc Arín =

Valencian trade unionist (1891–1936)

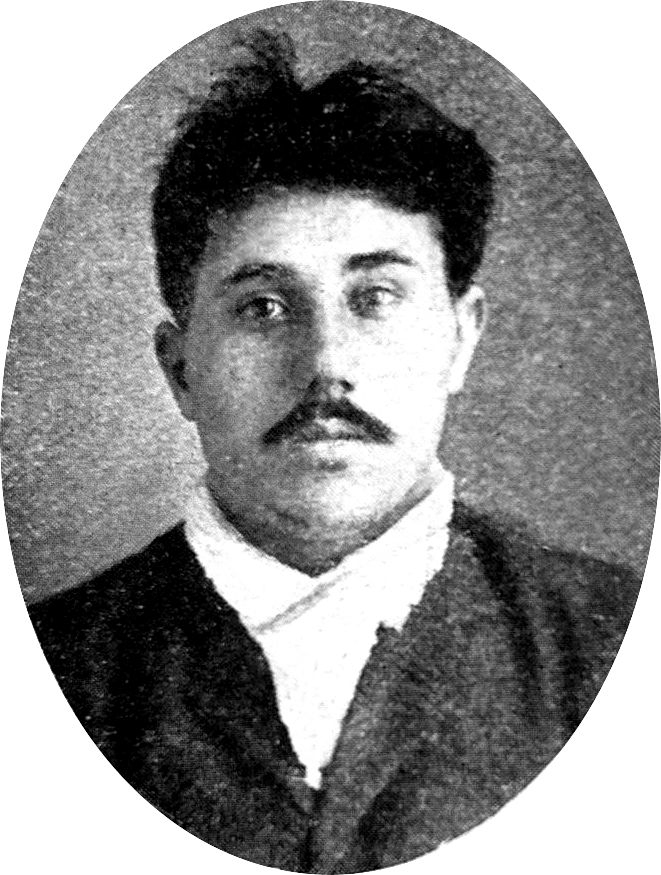
- Arín in 1912

General Secretary of the Confederación Nacional del Trabajo
- In office October 1930 – December 1931
- Preceded by: Progreso Alfarache
- Succeeded by: Ángel Pestaña

Personal details
- Born: Francesc Arín i Simó; 1891 Benicarló, Castelló, Spain
- Died: 18 July 1936 (aged 44–45) Carmona, Seville, Spain
- Cause of death: Executed by shooting
- Party: Federación Sindicalista Libertaria
- Other political affiliations: Confederación Nacional del Trabajo
- Domestic partner: Rosa Alés Prat
- Occupation: Metalworker, foreman, journalist
- Known for: Manifesto of the Thirty

Francesc Arín i Simó (Note: Also known by the Spanish: Francisco Arín Simó and sometimes the Spanish: Francisco Martínez Arín) (1891–1936) was a Valencian trade unionist and journalist. A metalworker by trade, Arín became a union leader in the Confederación Nacional del Trabajo (CNT), within which he formed part of the moderate faction. He led the metalworkers' union through the early 1920s, which saw him arrested, exiled and blacklisted. He then switched professions to work in the fishing industry, within which he likewise became a trade union leader. During the dictatorship of Primo de Rivera, he joined the Solidaridad group led by Ángel Pestaña and continued to organise the CNT throughout the period.

When he was elected as the General Secretary of the CNT in 1930, he began to pursue a policy of legalisation, opposing the use of conspiratorial methods against the government. After the proclamation of the Second Spanish Republic, he argued for the temporary defence of the republic until the CNT had consolidated its strength and the threat of a reactionary coup d'état had been averted. Together with Pestaña, he published the Manifesto of the Thirty, which criticised premature calls for insurrection by individual cadres. The faction gradually lost influence within the CNT and eventually split from it entirely, forming the Federación Sindicalista Libertaria (FSL). Arín pushed for the FSL's reintegration into the CNT and rejoined the organisation by 1936. He was killed by the Nationalists in the first days of the Spanish Civil War.

== Biography ==
=== Early life and activism ===
Francesc Arín i Simó was born in the Valencian town of Benicarló, in 1891. By 1910, he had moved to Argentina, where he became involved in the anarchist movement as a contributor to the magazine La Protesta. He became known to the Argentine government as a "dangerous foreigner" and, on 2 March 1912, he was prosecuted for an article he co-wrote for La Protesta in which he insulted President Roque Sáenz Peña. Although he was acquitted due to a lack of merit, he was nevertheless deported on 26 March 1912 to Barcelona, where he joined the anarcho-syndicalist movement.

A metalworker by trade, by 1918, he had become a leading trade unionist within the Confederación Nacional del Trabajo (CNT), as secretary of the Barcelona Metalworkers' Union. Together with Ángel Pestaña and Salvador Seguí, he was also a leading figure in the moderate faction of the CNT.

In October 1920, he led a strike action by metalworkers in Barcelona, which ended in an agreement with their employers. The following month, after Severiano Martínez Anido was appointed as governor of the province of Barcelona and initiated a campaign of repression against the syndicalist movement, Arín was arrested and imprisoned on board the Giralda, in the port of Barcelona. He was subsequently deported to La Mola for his trade unionist activities, but by 1922, he had returned to mainland Spain. In July 1922, he was delegated by the metalworkers' union to the CNT's regional conference in Blanes. In January 1923, he also presided over a regional plenary of the CNT in Barceloneta.

By 1923, Arín had been blacklisted from jobs in the metalworking industry; he was forced to change professions, managing to find work as a foreman, unloading freshly-caught fish at the docks. From 1924 to 1925, he collaborated on the magazine Fructidor.

=== Clandestine activities ===
During the dictatorship of Primo de Rivera, he joined Ángel Pestaña's group Solidaridad. After the collapse of the dictatorship, he became editor of the group's weekly magazine Acción, which published its first issue on 15 February 1930, and was tasked with reorganising the CNT after years in clandestinity. He participated in rallies in Mataró and Barcelona, organised respectively by unions in the local cinema and theatre sectors, and was also elected as president of the CNT's fishing union.

In June 1930, he joined the CNT's national committee, headed by Progreso Alfarache. After Alfarache's arrest in September 1930, Arín himself took over as General Secretary of the Confederación Nacional del Trabajo. From this position, he acted as the CNT's official representative in meetings with republican revolutionary committees, which aimed to overthrow the Spanish monarchy, but he came out opposed to the use of any conspiratorial methods. Instead, in January 1931, he went to La Model prison in Barcelona, where he signed a document calling for the CNT to carry out a public campaign for political freedom. He began to campaign openly for the legalisation of the CNT, even sending a delegation to meet with the prime minister Juan Bautista Aznar-Cabañas at the end of February. The following month, he explained his decision in an article published in Solidaridad Obrera.

=== Treintism ===
Following the proclamation of the Second Spanish Republic in June 1931, he participated in the CNT's extraordinary congress in Madrid, where he reaffirmed his moderate political positions. Together with Pestaña and Joan Peiró, who also served on the national committee, Arín revealed the extent of the CNT's collaboration with Catalan republican groups against the dictatorship and outlined his belief that the nascent Republic had to be temporarily supported until the CNT had consolidated itself and the threat of a reactionary coup d'état had been averted, which provoked a heated exchange between delegates. When members of the Federación Anarquista Ibérica (FAI) objected to the national committee's collaborationism, Arín accused them of hypocrisy, claiming that it had been the FAI that had initiated their collaboration with republican political and military groups, without having consulted the national committee.

Over time, Arín became increasingly critical of the FAI, which he accused of acting against the CNT. In response, Arín himself proposed to his fellow moderates that they publish a manifesto, personally signed with each of their names. In August 1931, he and 29 other moderate members of the CNT signed the Manifesto of the Thirty. Drafted by Pestaña and rewritten by Progreso Alfarache, Agustín Gibanel and Ricardo Fornells, the manifesto criticised the FAI's revolutionary aspirations as "naive", declaring that revolution could only be accomplished by the co-ordinated will of the working masses, not by a militant minority. Arín and his fellow treintistas were subsequently denounced by members of the FAI, including Buenaventura Durruti and Joan Garcia i Oliver, the latter of whom accused them of "dictatorial syndicalism". Undeterred, Arín contributed to the publication of the Solidaridad group's official weekly newspaper, Cultura Libertaria, which began publication in November 1931.

In March 1932, Arín and Pestaña were removed from the CNT's national committee and the treintistas increasingly lost influence within the organisation. The following month, Arín participated in the CNT's regional plenary in Sabadell, which saw the split of the treintista unions from the rest of organisation. In May 1932, he organised a meeting of the CNT's local federation in Sabadell, in which they defined their position on the Statute of Autonomy of Catalonia of 1932. In July 1932, he was expelled from the CNT's transport union, which he had presided over for a year; that same month, he also established the Barcelona Fishing Industry Union along treintista lines, for which he served as president until February 1932.

Arín was a founding member of the treintista organisation, the Federación Sindicalista Libertaria (FSL). He was elected to preside over its first meeting, set to be held on 9 April 1933, but it wasn't able to go ahead because of the CNT's opposition to it. When Pestaña left the FSL in 1934, Arín took over as the organisation's vice-secretary, a position from which he oversaw its reintegration into the CNT. The following year, he began collaborating on the magazine Sindicalismo. In February 1936, he co-organised a rally in Mataró with Joan Peiró; and in June 1936, a rally in Balsareny with Antonio Ortiz Ramírez.

=== Death ===
At the outbreak of the Spanish Civil War, he was in the middle of a propaganda tour; he found himself in the province of Seville when it was captured by Nationalists during their coup d'état. On 18 July 1936, after a meeting in Carmona, he was arrested and shot by the forces of Gonzalo Queipo de Llano.

== See also ==
- Anarchism in Spain

== Bibliography ==
- Christie, Stuart (2000). We, the Anarchists! A Study of the Iberian Anarchist Federation (FAI) 1927–1937. Hastings: Meltzer Press. ISBN 1901172066. OCLC 803517498.
- Delhom, Joël (2007). "Les mémoires inédits de Manuel Sirvent Romero (1890-1968): le texte et ses dessous" (PDF). In Chaput, Marie-Claude; Pérez Serrano, Julio (eds.). De l'anarchisme aux courants alternatifs: XIX e-XXIe siècles (in French). Université Paris X-Nanterre-Publidix. pp. 281–304. ISBN 978-2-85901-034-8.
- Ibarz Gelabert, Jordi; Molina Javierre, Ma Pilar (2000). "Arín i Simó, Francesc". In Martínez de Sas, María Teresa; Pagès i Blanch, Pelai (eds.). Diccionari biogràfic del moviment obrer als Països Catalans (in Catalan). Publicacions de L'Abadia de Montserrat. p. 114. ISBN 84-8415-243-X.
- Íñiguez, Miguel (2001). "Martínez Arín, Francisco". Esbozo de una enciclopedia histórica del anarquismo español (in Spanish). Madrid: Fundación de Estudios Libertarios Anselmo Lorenzo. p. 384. ISBN 9788486864453. OCLC 807322760.
- Tarcus, Horacio; Margarucci, Ivanna (2023). "Arín, Francisco". Diccionario Biográfico de las Izquierdas Latinoamericanas (in Spanish). Buenos Aires: Centro de Documentación e Investigación de la Cultura de Izquierdas. OCLC 1336503725.
