= Syndicalist Party =

Defunct Spanish political party

Syndicalist Party Partido Sindicalista
- Leader: Ángel Pestaña, Benito Pabón
- Secretary: Eduardo Medrano Rivas
- Founder: Ángel Pestaña
- Founded: 1932; 1974 (Note: Refoundation)
- Dissolved: 1985
- Newspaper: El Pueblo; Hora Sindicalista; Mañana
- Youth wing: Syndicalist Youth
- Membership: 30,000 (1937)
- Ideology: Libertarian socialism Libertarian possibilism Treintism; Anarcho-syndicalism
- Political position: Far-left

Party flag

The Syndicalist Party (Spanish: Partido Sindicalista; Catalan: Partit Sindicalista) was a left-wing political party in Spain, formed by Ángel Pestaña in 1932. Pestaña, a leading member of the Confederación Nacional del Trabajo (CNT) trade union, formed the party in response to the growing influence of the Iberian Anarchist Federation over the CNT. He and other notable members of the CNT had previously signed a Manifest dels Trenta ("Manifesto of the Thirty"), which had got them expelled.

The thesis of Ángel Pestaña was to contribute to the workers' movement by endowing it with a political party which, without interfering in their work, collaborated with the industrial unions, but with full autonomy. It differed from the PSOE-UGT pact in that it intended to avoid all subordination of union work to partisan political interests. Pestaña's libertarian possibilist tendency corresponded with the British Independent Labour Party, a representation of workers' interests in Parliament with a revolutionary purpose; that is, the achievement of libertarian communism with an organization based on the cooperatives, trade unions and municipalities.

== History ==
Political poster of the 1930s Spanish Syndicalist Party

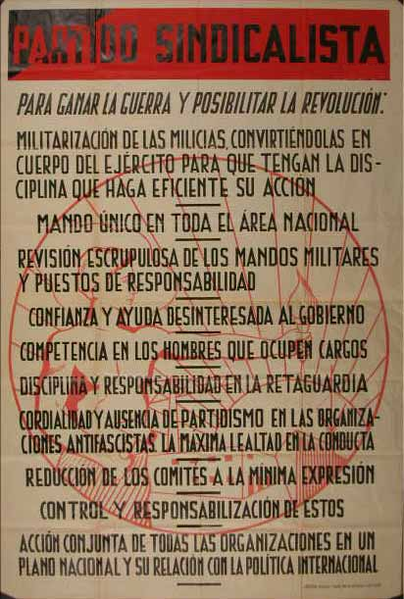
Propaganda of the Syndicalist Party.

Only a minority in the CNT, the possibilist tendency was isolated due to its moderate syndicalist stance, and depended on several cells in Madrid, Andalusia, Zaragoza, Catalonia, and Valencia. The Syndicalist Party published a daily newspaper, El Pueblo. In Barcelona the Catalan Federation of the party published Hora Sindicalista (1936–1937) and then Mañana until January 1939. The youth wing of the party was the Syndicalist Youth (Juventud Sindicalista). The republican artillery captain Eduardo Medrano Rivas was party secretary. In the 1936 Spanish general election two party members, Pestaña and Benito Pabón, were elected to the parliament as affiliates of the Popular Front.

The group backed the Republican faction during the Spanish Civil War. However, affected by the death of Ángel Pestaña, the party dissolved itself in December 1937, still numbering 30,000 members.

=== Refoundation (1974-1985) ===
In 1974 a new generation of syndicalists launched a party with the same name, based on the tradition of the old Syndicalist Party. In the 1977 Spanish general election, together with the still illegal Communist Movement, Socialist Movement and Workers' Communist Party, it formed part of an electoral alliance called the Popular Unity Candidacy (CUP), positioned to the left of the Communist Party of Spain. In the 1979 Spanish general election, the Syndicalist Party obtained 9,777 votes (0.05%), the majority of them obtained in Catalonia where it got 5,932 votes (0.2%). The party lasted until 1985, when it once again dissolved itself.
