= Progreso Alfarache Arrabal =

Andalusian anarcho-syndicalist

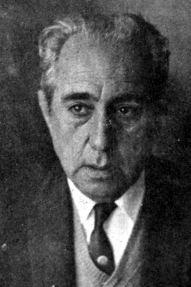
- Alfarache Arrabal (c. 1930)

General Secretary of the Confederación Nacional del Trabajo
- In office 27 June 1930 – 27 September 1930
- Preceded by: Ángel Pestaña
- Succeeded by: Francesc Arín

Personal details
- Born: 1888 Algeciras, Andalusia, Spain
- Died: 20 February 1964 (aged 75–76) Mexico City, Mexico
- Cause of death: Surgical complications

Progreso Alfarache Arrabal (1888 - 20 February 1964) was an Andalusian anarcho-syndicalist, also known by the pseudonym Antonio Rodríguez.

== Biography ==
Self-taught, he worked as a linotype artist and in 1919 he was one of the delegates of the Graphic Arts Union of Seville to the congress of the CNT at the Madrid Comedy Theatre. The same year he was arrested for the first time for his involvement in a rent strike. In 1920 he was appointed secretary of the Andalusian Regional Committee of the CNT and editor of Solidaridad Obrera, and during the dictatorship of Primo de Rivera he had to go into exile in France. In 1929 he befriended the writer Ramón J. Sender and in 1930 he settled in Barcelona, where he served as general secretary of the National Committee of the CNT (27 June–December 1930). In August 1930 he participated, with Rafael Vidiella, as an observer of the CNT in what would later become the Pact of San Sebastián. For this reason he was arrested in Jerez de la Frontera on 27 September 1930, and was not released until March 1931.

After the proclamation of the Second Spanish Republic he went to Madrid to participate in the Extraordinary Confederal Congress of the CNT (11–16 June 1931). In August of that year he was one of the promoters and editors of the Manifesto of the Thirty, which is why he was excluded from the CNT and aligned himself with the opposition cenetista unions.

In April 1932 he took part in the Extraordinary Plenary Session of the CRTC in Sabadell and on 28 May 1932 he was sentenced to six months in prison for insulting the Civil Guard in an article published in Solidaridad Obrera. In September 1933 he was appointed deputy secretary of the Graphic and Similar Industries Union of the CNT of Barcelona and participated in the creation of the Workers' Alliance.

During the Spanish Civil War he was a member of the Economic Council of the Generalitat de Catalunya and was the secretary of Horacio Martínez Prieto when he was appointed minister. When the war came to an end he went into exile in Mexico, where he defended the collaborationist theses and it organized in 1942 the group "New FAI", opposed to the postulates defended by Joan Garcia i Oliver. In 1944 he was secretary of the CNT in Mexico and in 1945 he participated on behalf of the Spanish Libertarian Movement as Director General of Fisheries of the Minister of Public Works Horacio Martínez Prieto in José Giral's Spanish Republican government in exile in Mexico. At the end of 1946 he returned clandestinely to Spain to represent the exiles in the National Committee of the CNT, but was arrested in Madrid in March 1947 and imprisoned in the Ocaña Penitentiary. After spending a few years in prison he returned to Mexico, where he directed the magazine Comunidad Ibérica from 1963. He died of complications after an operation at the Sanatorio Español in Mexico.

Preceded by Juan López Sánchez	General Secretary of the CNT; 1930	Succeeded by Ángel Pestaña
