= Jordi Colomer =

Spanish artist (born 1962)

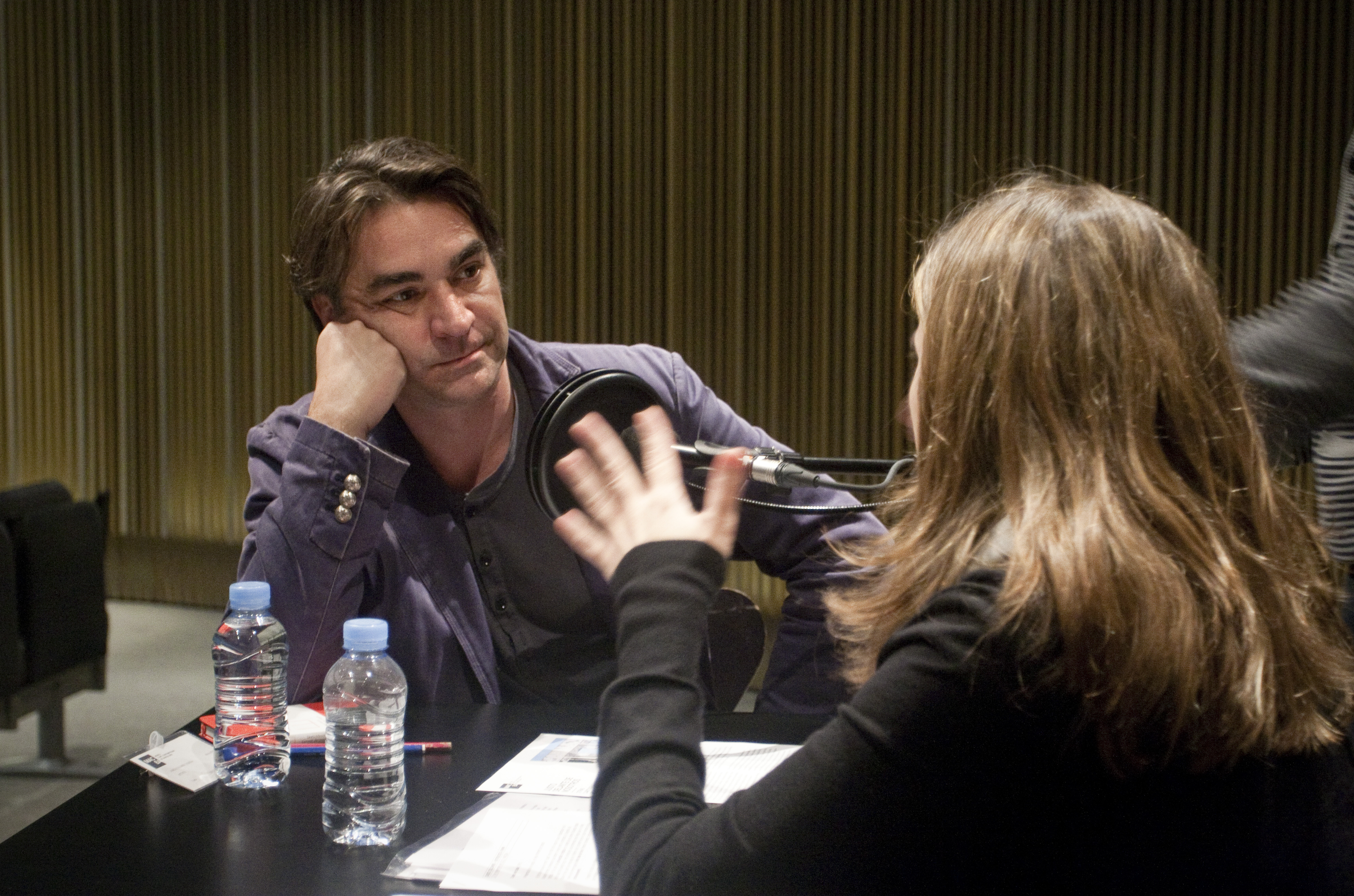
Jordi Colomer interviewed by Radio Web Macba

Jordi Colomer (born 1962) is a Spanish artist. He lives and works in Paris and Barcelona. Colomer has worked in the media of sculpture, video, and installation art.

== Biography ==
Colomer was born in 1962 in Barcelona. He studied at the School Eina of Art and Design, History of Art and Architecture in Barcelona. He has worked as a set designer for theater works by Valère Novarina, Joan Brossa, Samuel Beckett, and Robert Ashley. In his first period, he developed sculptures of an architectural scale, walkable buildings, and references to the theater and its devices. In 1996 he began working with videos, in the form of micro-narratives where the characters are confronted with objects, sets, and props. Examples include Simo (1997) and Le Dortoir (2001).

The video series Anarchitekton (2002–2004), is one of his most emblematic; in the four cities of Barcelona, Bucharest, Brasília, and Osaka, the character called Idroj Sanicne carries cardboard models and replicas of real buildings. Through changes of scale he describes a sarcastic and critical drift. Other important works are Arabian Stars (2005), filmed in Yemen, A Crime (2005), No Future (2006), and En la Pampa (2008), a five-screen installation filmed at the Atacama Desert in northern Chile.

In 2008 the Galerie Nationale du Jeu de Paume in Paris hosted a retrospective exhibition of his work. He is represented in numerous museums and collections: Museo Reina Sofia, Madrid, Centre Georges Pompidou, Paris, MUMOK, Vienna, MACBA, Barcelona. Colomer represented Spain at 57th Venice Biennale, 2017. ** He has participated in two editions of Manifesta, the European nomadic biennial: Manifesta X, St. Petersburg (Russia), curated by Kasper König, and Manifesta XII, Palermo (Sicily). The MACBA presented in 2024 a major retrospective of his work, exhibition for which he received the City of Barcelona visual arts award. His work is represented by Galerie Michel Rein (Paris-Brussels), Albarrán-Bourdais (Madrid).

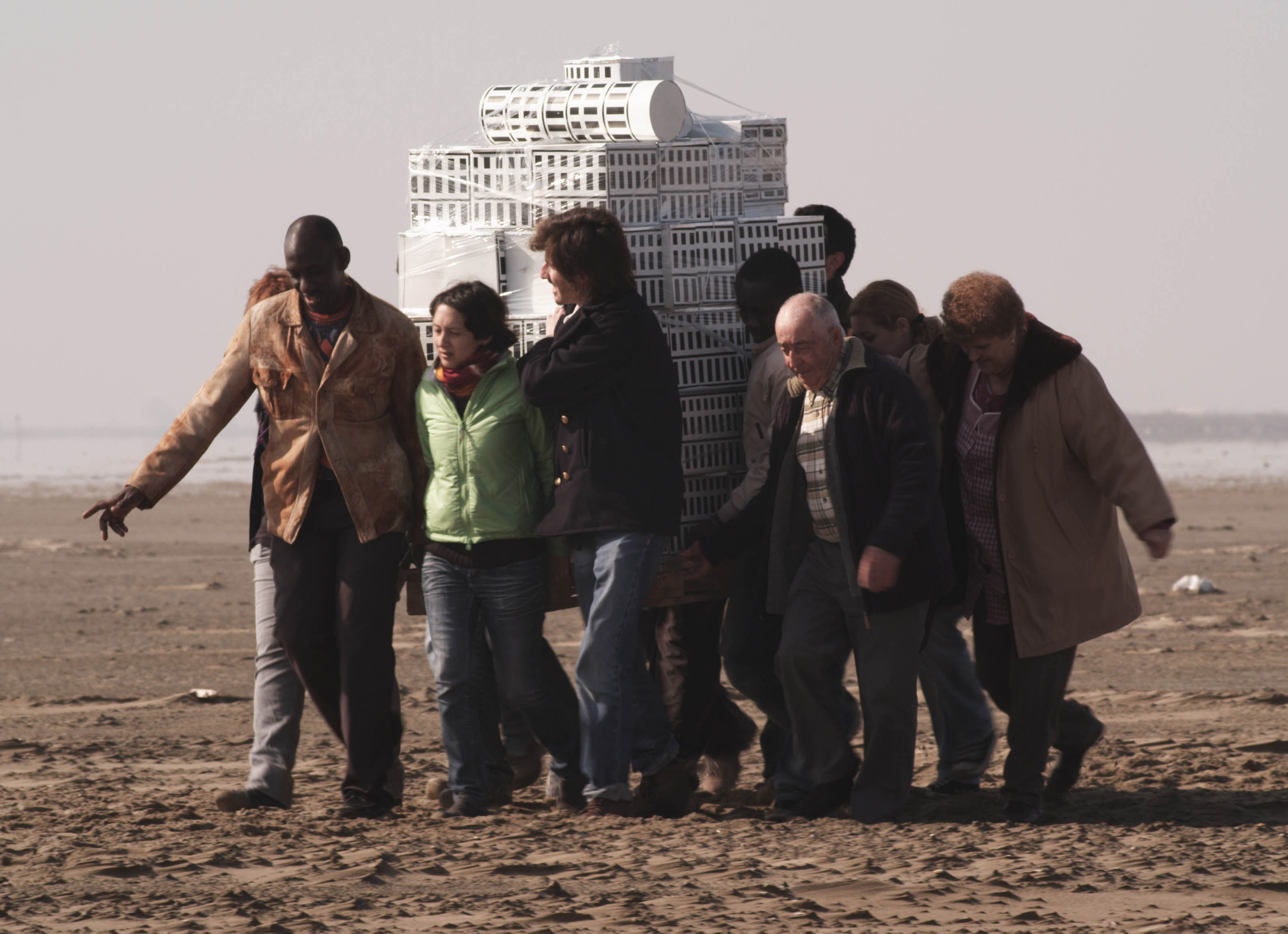
Colomer. L'avenir. 2011
