= Josep Colomer =

Spanish political scientist and economist

Josep Maria Colomer Calsina is a political scientist and economist. His research focuses on the strategies for the design, establishment, and change of political institutions. Topics include the processes of democratization, the origins of parliamentary and separation of powers regimes, the invention of electoral systems and voting rules, the development of nations and empires such as the United States and the European Union, and the increasing role of global institutions.

Colomer graduated at the University of Barcelona and was Fulbright Scholar at the University of Chicago. He was a Distinguished Professor and is currently an Associate Researcher at the School of Foreign Service of Georgetown University in Washington and at the Institute of Political and Social Sciences of the Autonomous University of Barcelona. He is a member by election of the Academia Europaea, and has been awarded life membership to the American Political Science Association and the Mexican Association of Political Sciences.

He is the author of 18 books and the editor of 8 books, published in 44 editions in five languages, and the author of about 200 academic articles and book chapters, included in The American Political Science Review, Central European Political Science Review, Political Economy, Electoral Studies, European Journal of Political Science, European Political Science, Journal of Theoretical Politics, Magyar Politikatudomanyi Tanulmanyok, Nationalities Papers, Política y Gobierrno, Political Studies, PS: Political Science & Politics, Public Choice, Rationality and Society, Research & Politics, Revista de Estudios Políticos, Spanish Journal of Political Science, Social Choice and Welfare, as well as in the main encyclopedias in the discipline. In the Oxford Handbook of Political Science, Colomer is recognized as one of the "sub-discipline leaders" (1 percent of the most cited authors) in the field of Political Institutions. He is a member of the editorial committees of numerous magazines and Senior Editor of the Oxford Research Encyclopedia of Politics.

== Selected publications ==
- Colomer, Josep M. (2023). Constitutional Polarization. A Critical Review of the US Political System. Routledge. ISBN 9781032495224.
- Colomer, Josep M.; Beale, Ashley L. (2020). Democracy and Globalization: Anger, Fear, and Hope. Routledge. ISBN 9780367461928.
- Colomer, Josep (2019). The Spanish Frustration: How a ruinous empire thwarted the nation-state. Anthem Press. ISBN 9781783089888.
- Colomer, Josep (2011). The Science of Politics: An Introduction. Oxford University Press. ISBN 9780195397741.
- Colomer, Josep (2014). How Global Institutions Rule the World. Palgrave Macmillan. ISBN 978-1-349-50173-1.
- Colomer, Josep, ed. (2011). Personal Representation : The neglected dimension of electoral systems. ECPR Press. ISBN 9781907301575.
- Colomer, Josep (ed.). Comparative European Politics (3rd 2008 ed.). Routledge.
- Colomer, Josep (2008). Great Empires, Small Nations: The Uncertain Future of the Sovereign State. Routledge.
- Colomer, Josep (2003). Political Institutions. Democracy and' Social Choice. Comparative Politics. Oxford University Press. ISBN 978-0-19-924184-2.
- Colomer, Josep M, ed. (2004). The Handbook of Electoral System Choice. Palgrave Macmillan UK. ISBN 978-1-349-50942-3 – via www.palgrave.com.
- Colomer, Josep. Strategic Transitions. Game Theory and Democratization. Johns Hopkins University Press. ISBN 9780801875069.
- Colomer, Josep M. (1998). "The Spanish 'state of autonomies': Non-institutional federalism". West European Politics. 21 (4): 40–52. doi:10.1080/01402389808425270.
- Game Theory and the Transition to Democracy: The Spanish model. Edward Elgar. 1995. ISBN 978-1858982014.
