= Subsistence crisis =

Crisis which occurs when access to basic necessities are challenged

A subsistence crisis affects individuals or communities unable to obtain basic necessities due to either man-made or natural factors such as inflation, drought or war. Severe subsistence crises are considered famines. While Jean Meuvret coined the term in France in 1946, economic historian Pierre Goubert popularized the concept during the 1960s with his study of economic inequality and mortality in Beauvais 1709–10. A Subsistence crisis is an extreme situation where basic needs of livelihood are endangered. Subsistence crises affect individuals or communities unable to obtain basic necessities due to either man-made or natural factors such as inflation, drought or war.

== Historical Subsistence Crises ==
Date	Name	Location	Causes
1709–10		France	
1788–89		France	• Crop failure • Grain shortage
1921–23	Hyperinflation in the Weimar Republic	Germany	• Post-war debt • Creation of money to offset debt • Rapid inflation
1816	The Year Without a Summer	Northern Hemisphere	• Decreased global temperatures from severe climate abnormalities brought on by volcanic eruptions.
1845–49	The Great Irish Potato Famine	Ireland	• Over-reliance of the Irish population on the potato crop. • A disease called blight being accidentally transported on ships from America
2016–present	Hyperinflation in Venezuela	Venezuela	• Oil-based, non-diversified economy • Sudden drop in price of oil in 2016 • Continued ame spending practices as before decrease in oil prices • Creation of money to offset debt • Hyperinflation

== See also ==
- Famine
- Hail
- Drought
