= Villoldo =

Coordinates: 42°17′N 4°36′W

- municipality
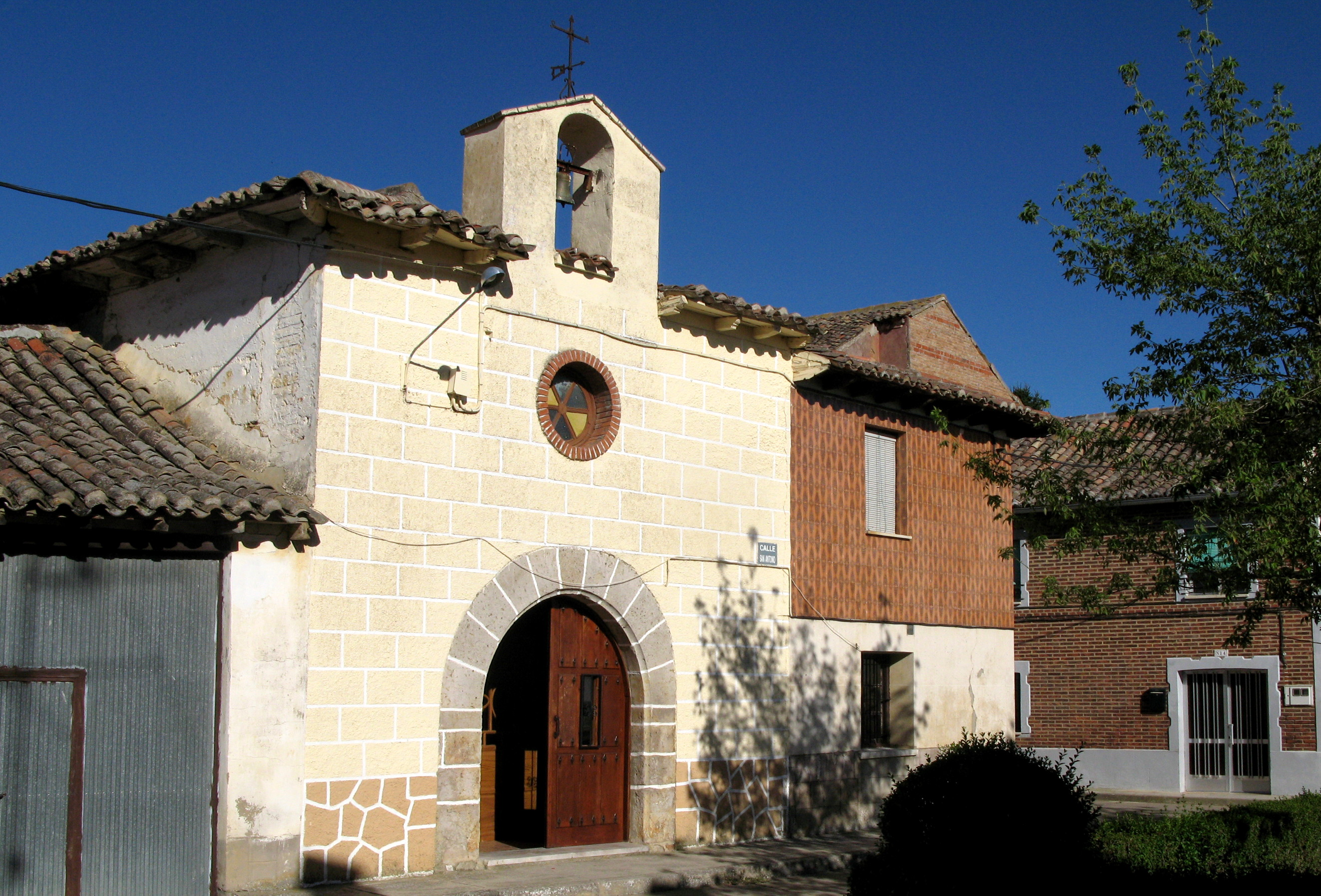

- Coat of arms
- Interactive map of Villoldo
- Country: Spain
- Autonomous community: Castile and León
- Province: Palencia
- Municipality: Villoldo

Area
  - Total: 40 km^{2} (15 sq mi)
- Elevation: 790 m (2,590 ft)

Population (2025-01-01)
  - Total: 333
  - Density: 8.3/km^{2} (22/sq mi)
- Time zone: UTC+1 (CET)
  - Summer (DST): UTC+2 (CEST)
- Website: Official website

Villoldo is a municipality located in the province of Palencia, Castile and León, Spain. According to the 2022 census (INE), the municipality has a population of 335 inhabitants.
