= Daniel Anguiano =

Spanish trade unionist and communist politician

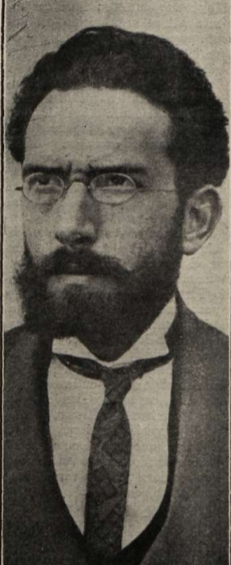

Member of the Congress of Deputies
- In office 16 May 1918 – 2 May 1919
- Constituency: Valencia

Madrid municipal councillor
- In office 1 January 1916 – 1 January 1918
- Constituency: Hospital

Personal details
- Born: 11 December 1882 Haro, Spain
- Died: 12 August 1963 (aged 80) Mexico City, Mexico
- Party: Federal Republican Party, PSOE, PCOE, PCE

Daniel Anguiano Mangado (Note: The second family name is sometimes referred to as "Munguito" [sic].) (1882–1963) was a Spanish trade unionist and politician. As member of the Spanish Socialist Workers' Party (PSOE) and the Unión General de Trabajadores (UGT), he assumed a leading role in the 1917 general strike. An endorser of the PSOE's adhesion to the Third International, he left the party to form the Spanish Communist Workers' Party (PCOE) in 1921.

== Biography ==
Born on 11 December 1882 in Haro (province of Logroño), he left the province as a child. Installed in Madrid after a time in Santander and Catarroja due to the vicissitudes of his father's job as railway worker, Anguiano—previously a member of the Federal Republican Party— became a member of the Spanish Socialist Workers' Party (PSOE) in 1905 or 1908.

A member of the Unión General de Trabajadores (UGT) since 1907, he replaced Vicente Barrio at the helm of the UGT's railway union in 1914. Anguiano was elected as Madrid municipal councillor in representation of the district of Hospital at the 14 November 1915 municipal election. Anguiano promoted an initiative passed at the 12th UGT Congress in May 1916 intending to promote a campaign based on demonstrations and protests to force the Government of Spain to pass legislation in order to mitigate the social-economical crisis. The same congress agreed on the opening of negotiations with the rival and anarchist Confederación Nacional del Trabajo (CNT). Gerald H. Meaker points out that despite being admired because of his character, Anguiano enjoyed little oratorical skills. He was initiated as freemason in August 1917.

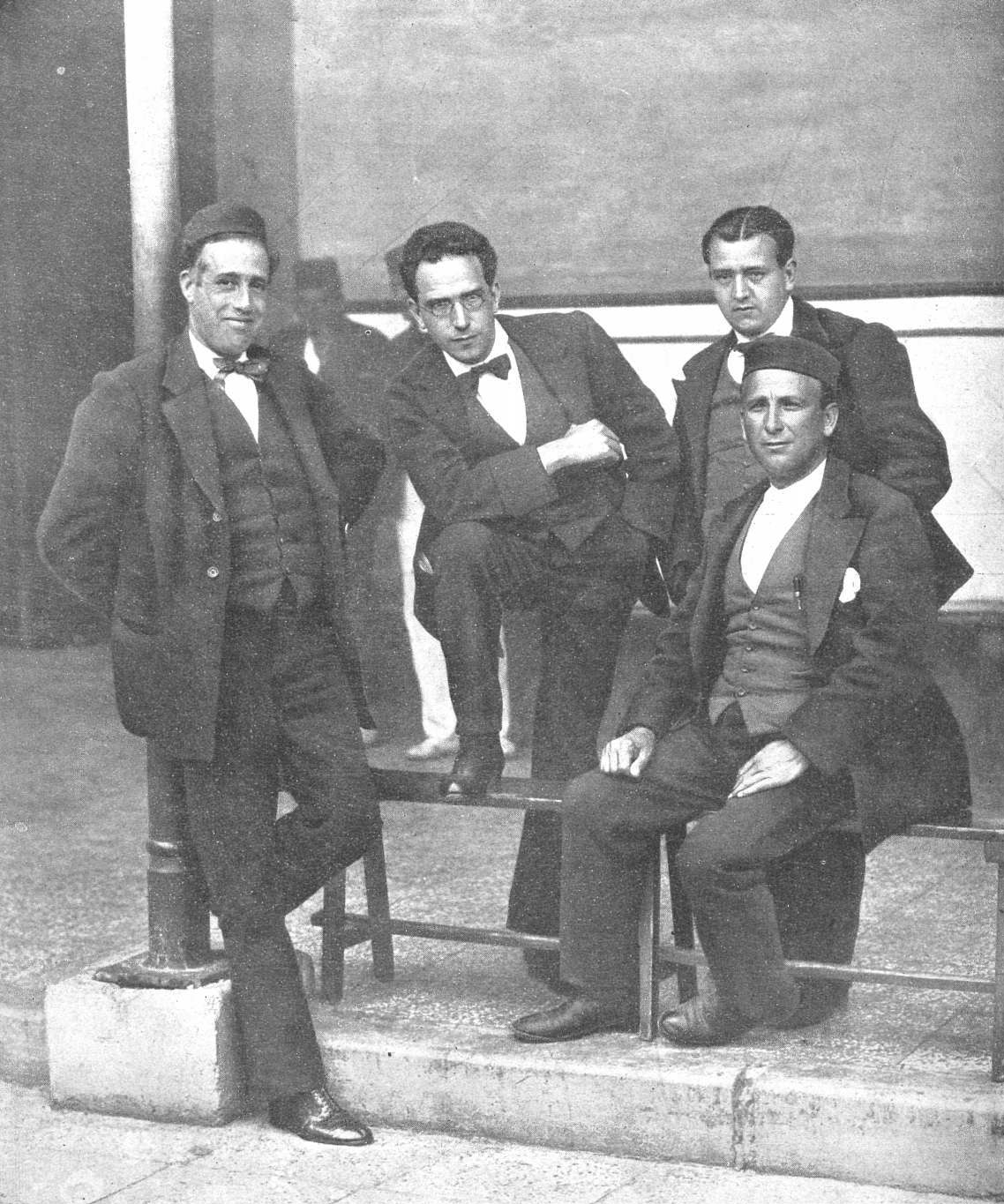
Julián Besteiro, Anguiano, Andrés Saborit and Francisco Largo Caballero at the Cartagena Prison (1918).

As representative of the UGT, Anguiano formed along fellow Socialists Francisco Largo Caballero (UGT) and Julián Besteiro and Andrés Saborit (PSOE representatives) the managing committee of the August 1917 general strike. Captured along the rest of the managing committee, he was trialed in drumhead court-martial on charges of military sedition and generic rebellion with the prosecutor asking for life imprisonment and permanent disqualification. He was declared guilty of the charges in 4 October, and transferred to the Cartagena Prison on 20 October 1917.

While still imprisoned, he earned a seat to the Congress of Deputies at the February 1918 general election in representation of the Valencia constituency, running under the banner of the Alianza de las Izquierdas platform. Félix Azzati was the other member of the platform elected in the constituency. He had previously rejected the pardon, but took possession of his seat thanks to the May 1918 amnesty.

Durante his travel to the conference of the Second International celebrated in Rotterdam in 1920, he was surprised by the Dutch police in possession of a letter asking the Comintern for funding to deliver propaganda of the Third International in Spain, and was subsequently arrested. He took part along Fernando de los Ríos of the entourage sent to Russia by the PSOE in 1920 to assess the prospect of the party's adhesion to the Communist International, meeting Lenin. In his ensuing briefing Anguiano delivered a rather positive report, bar some reservation (in contrast to the starkly negative report by de los Ríos), on the state of affairs of Soviet Russia.

Anguiano therefore defended the joining of the PSOE to the Third International at the PSOE Extraordinary Congress in 1921. After the rejection of the majority of the party membership to accept the Twenty-one Conditions and join the Communist International, Anguiano led a split of the party, the Spanish Communist Workers' Party (PCOE), soon merged with another tercerista split, the Spanish Communist Party, to form the Communist Party of Spain (PCE) in November 1921. Anguiano soon left the PCE's managing board.

He was preemptively jailed again from November 1928 to March 1929, accused of the charge of "conspiration for rebellion", after a plot prepared by September 1928 against the dictatorship of Primo de Rivera. He was probed after Vicente Costales paid the 10,000 pesetas the bail was set at. After his second spell in jail, he returned to the UGT and the PSOE, and worked for Radio Ibérica and CAMPSA. An exile from the Francoist regime, Anguiano successively lived in France, Santo Domingo, Cuba, Hungary and Mexico, dying in Mexico City on 12 August 1963.
