= Eduardo Comín Colomer =

Eduardo Comín Colomer (1908–1975) was a Spanish Catholic essayist and journalist. He was known for his anti-Masonic and anticommunist views.

== Education and career ==
Eduardo Comín Colomer was a police officer. There is a fund of books from his collection on the Spanish Civil War and Freemasonry at the National Library of Spain.

Colomer worked as a journalist at a young age, obtaining his qualifications at the Official School of Journalism in Madrid in 1949. He was a correspondent, editor and contributor to numerous Spanish newspapers.

He belonged to the Police Force, becoming director of its School. His membership in this body allowed him privileged access to reports, documents and files, so much so that one of the important documentary sources available to the National Library of Spain is specifically Fondo Comin (Comín Fund), bequeathed by his widow in 1975 and consists of more than 15,000 documents, including books and pamphlets, mostly relating to the Second Republic, the Civil War and Freemasonry.

== Works ==
- La masonería en acción. ¿Comó exterminarla? (Freemasonry in action. How can it be exterminated), Madrid, 1942.
- La masonería en España (Masonry in Spain), Madrid, 1942.
- Historia del anarquismo español 1836-1948 (History of Spanish anarchasim), Madrid.
- Comunismo y masonería (Communism and freemasonry), Segovia, 1951.
- Historia secreta de la segunda República (Secret history of the second republic), Madrid, 1954.
- Lo que España debe a la masonería (What Spain owes to Freemasonry), Madrid, 1956.
- Crónicas sobre masonería (Chronicles on masonry), Madrid, 1958.
