= Ángel Pestaña =

Spanish anarcho-syndicalist (1886–1937)

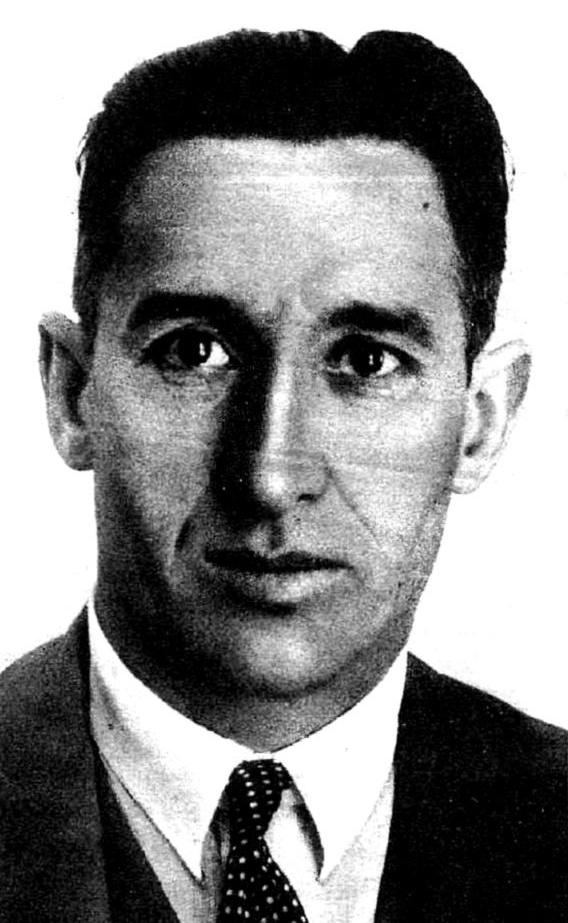

Member of the Congress of Deputies
- In office 28 February 1936 – 11 December 1937
- Constituency: Cádiz

General Secretary of the Syndicalist Party
- In office 1932 – 11 December 1937

General Secretary of the Confederación Nacional del Trabajo
- In office December 1931 – March 1932
- Preceded by: Francesc Arín
- Succeeded by: Manuel Rivas
- In office June 1929 – June 1930
- Preceded by: Joan Peiró
- Succeeded by: Progreso Alfarache

Personal details
- Born: Ángel Pestaña Núñez; 14 February 1886 Ponferrada, León, Spain
- Died: 11 December 1937 (aged 51) Begues, Barcelona, Spain
- Citizenship: Spanish
- Party: Syndicalist Party
- Occupation: Syndicalist, Politician

Ángel Pestaña Nuñez (1886–1937) was a Spanish anarcho-syndicalist general secretary of the Confederación Nacional del Trabajo (CNT), founder of the Syndicalist Party and member of the Cortes Generales.

== Life ==
=== Early years ===
He was born in Santo Tomás de las Ollas near Ponferrada, León in a poor family. When he was 14 years old he was left orphan by both parents and from then on, he had to survive on his own. When he was 15, he was arrested for participation in a conference for the establishment of the 8-hour working day. After this event he stayed for some time in northern Spain and southern France and ended up in Algiers, where he worked as watch maker. During his time in Algiers, he had news of the anarchist movement in Spain, and he started writing for the anarchist newspaper Tierra y Libertad.

=== Return to Spain ===
After the start of World War I, he returned to Spain, and joined the anarchist movement in Barcelona, through the CNT. In 1916 he was imprisoned for three months for participating in the organization of a strike. He continued to write in workers' newspapers and took part in co-organizing the 1917 general strike along with the Unión General de Trabajadores (UGT).

In April 1919, after Catalonia was shaken by La Canadenca strike, Pestaña was arrested and detained. He left for Bolshevist Russia in 1920, in order to be present at the 2nd Comintern Congress and the preliminary sessions of the Profintern. While in Russia, he met leaders of the October Revolution such as Vladimir Lenin, Leon Trotsky and Grigory Zinoviev and the anarcho-communist theoretician Peter Kropotkin. His experience in Russia, and the reports written by him and Gaston Leval were crucial in the CNT's distancing from the bolsheviks.

Together with his mentor Salvador Seguí, Pestaña opposed the paramilitary and terrorist actions advocated and carried out by other members of the CNT. In August 1922, he was the victim of an assassination attempt while giving a speech in Manresa, as part of the violent repression measures taken by the Spanish authorities against the labor movement. The indignation caused throughout Spain by news of this act brought the dismissal of several government officials, as well as an end to the Ley de fugas, a legislation that permitted the murder of trade union activists.

=== Primo de Rivera dictatorship ===
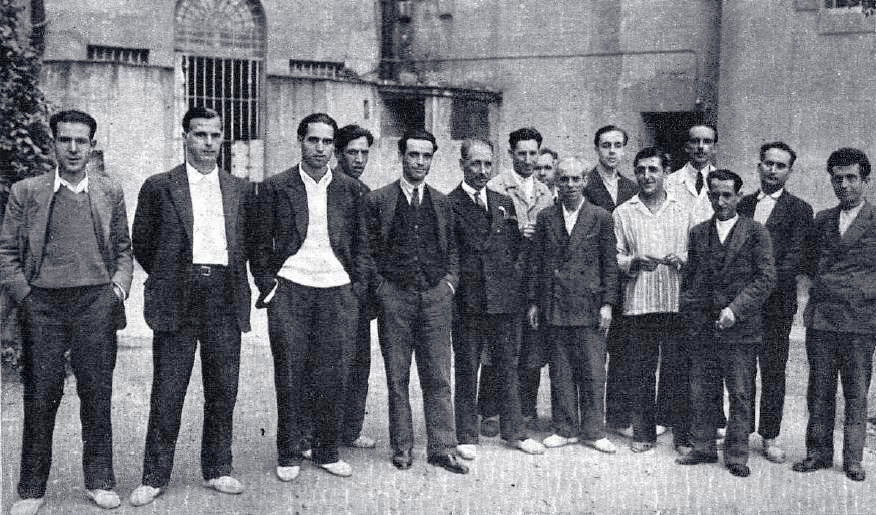
Ángel Pestaña with other political prisoners (among them Lluís Companys) in Barcelona, 1930.

During the dictatorship of Primo de Rivera, Pestaña was imprisoned and CNT declared illegal. In contrast to other CNT members he proposed the idea that the confederation should try to become legal by operating inside the margins imposed by the authorities. Other members of the CNT considered this would be in contrast to the main principles of the organization and thus CNT continued to operate illegally throughout the dictatorship.

=== Second Republic ===
After the proclamation of the Second Spanish Republic in 1931, the conflict between Pestaña's group and Federación Anarquista Ibérica (FAI) deepened: Pestaña initiated the issue of Manifiesto de los Treinta/Manifest dels Trenta ("Manifesto of the Thirty"), a clear condemnation of the Federación's tactics, one which got him expelled from the CNT in August. In 1934 he founded the Syndicalist Party which participated in the 1936 elections with the Popular Front winning 2 places in the parliament. When the Civil War started he was detained in Barcelona by nationalist forces but he was released when the republicans took control of the city. He was offered a position as a minister by the CNT but refused. Supporting the line of "winning the war first" he was readmitted to the CNT in late 1937 but died shortly afterwards due to illness.

== Legacy ==
A homage to Pestaña was made on 13 February 1938 at the Fuencarral Theater in Madrid, in commemoration of his birth. The tribute was attended by speakers of the Syndicalist Party, the Communist Party of Spain, the Popular Front, the Iberian Anarchist Federation, the Republican Left and the National Confederation of Labour.

A square in the Nou Barris district of Barcelona is named Ángel Pestaña in his honour.

== Sources ==
- Beevor, Antony (2006). The Battle for Spain: The Spanish Civil War, 1936–1939. London: Penguin Books. ISBN 0-14-303765-X.
- Carr, Raymond (2002). Modern Spain, 1875-1980. Oxford University Press. ISBN 0-19-280129-5.
- Peirats, José (2011). The CNT in the Spanish Revolution, Volume I. PM Press. ISBN 978-1-60486-207-2.
- Woodcock, George (2004). Anarchism: A History Of Libertarian Ideas And Movements. Broadview Press. ISBN 1-55111-629-4.
