= Government-in-exile of José Giral =

Government of Spain in exile from 1945 to 1947

- Gobierno en el exilio de José Giral

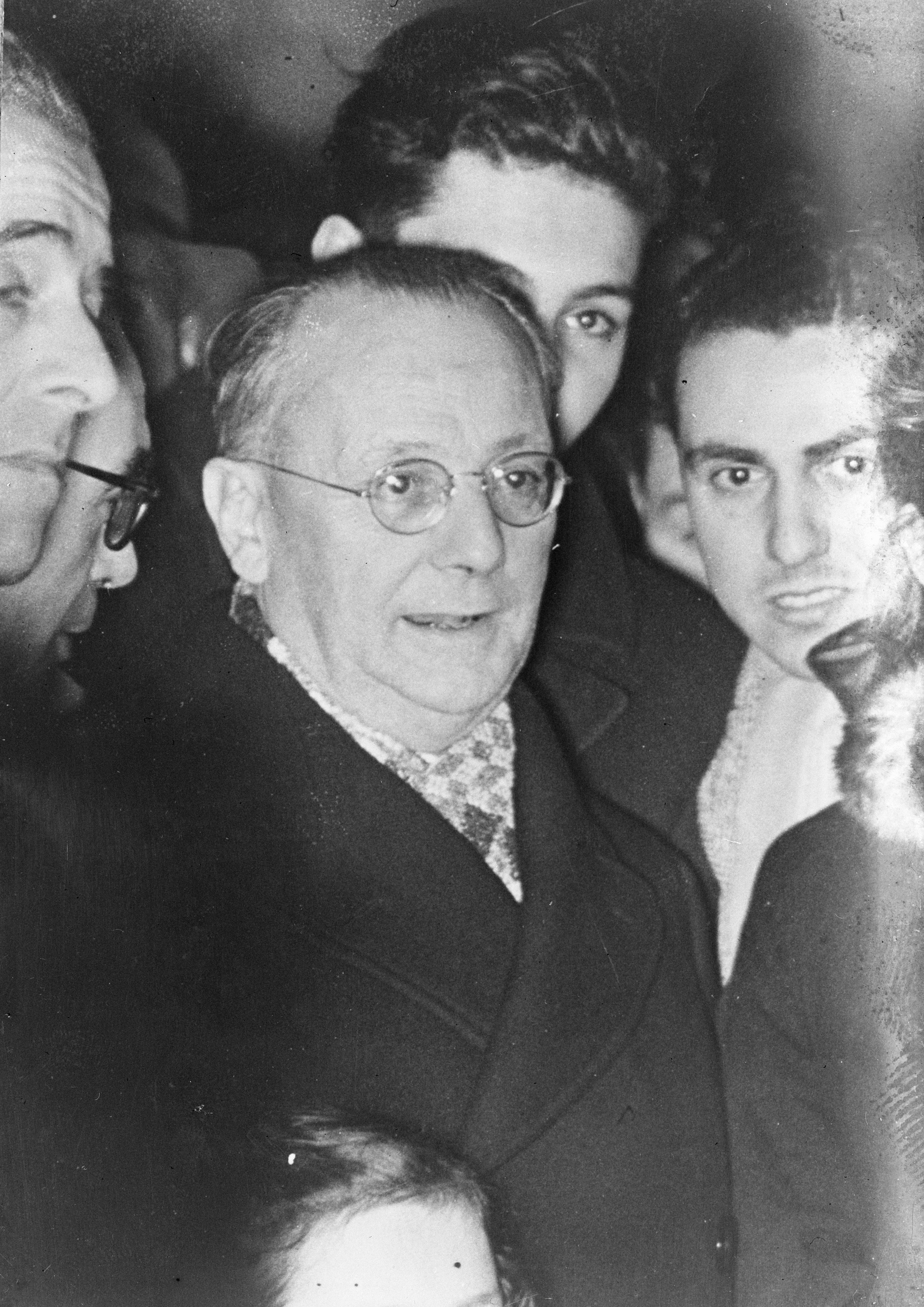
- Prime Minister José Giral

Agency overview
- Formed: 21 August 1945
- Preceding agency: Negrín administration^{a}
- Dissolved: 26 January 1947
- Superseding agency: Government-in-exile of Rodolfo Llopis
- Status: Government in exile
- Headquarters: Mexico City; Paris
- Ministers responsible: Fernando de los Ríos^{b}; Álvaro de Albornoz; Augusto Barcia; Juan Hernández Saravia; Miquel Santaló; Manuel de Irujo; Miguel Torres Campañá; Trifón Gómez; José Leyva; Horacio Martínez Prieto; Ángel Ossorio y Gallardo; Lluís Nicolau d'Olwer; Castelao^{c}; Santiago Carrillo^{c}; Rafael Sánchez Guerra^{d}

Footnotes
- ^aLegitimacy challenged after the end of the Civil War; ^bReplaced in March 1946 by Enrique de Francisco; ^cTook office in March 1946 as ministers without portfolio; ^dTook office in May 1946 as minister without portfolio

The Government-in-exile of José Giral—also known by its supporters as el gobierno de la esperanza— (Note: English: "The government of hope." According to historian Agustín Sánchez Andrés, this expression was coined by the Mexican press of the time to refer to the opportunity for the defeated Republican exile to reverse the outcome of the Civil War.) was an executive branch created on 21 August 1945 by the institutions of the Second Spanish Republic in exile and headed by José Giral, the former prime minister during the first months of the Civil War. It tried to put up a united front before the United Nations and the international community with the aim of isolating General Francisco Franco's regime, as well as obtaining international recognition as the only legitimate government of Spain in order to reestablish the Republic.

It was regarded with hostility right from the beginning, from both the negrinista sector—supporters of Juan Negrín—and the one headed by Indalecio Prieto, although for different reasons. It also diverged clearly from the National Alliance of Democratic Forces (ANFD), which was made up of a major part of the underground opposition within Spain. While it was recognized by several states and managed to get the United Nations General Assembly to approve Resolution 39 (1) condemning Franco's government, it did not achieve broad support from the international community nor got the UN Security Council to approve a resolution to implement measures against Franco. Pressure from the Spanish Socialist Workers' Party (PSOE) forced Giral to resign in January 1947.

== Background ==
=== The Franco regime ===
As World War II was nearing its end, the dictatorship headed by General Francisco Franco was still in power in Spain. However, it was widely perceived as the last fascist regime still standing and it was heavily under attack. It was clear that it had collaborated with the Axis powers during the war. The regime was considered undesirable. (Note: The latter is an archived news report dated 13 September 1977, which refers to the United States having made public "secret documents from 1950" that revealed Juan de Borbón had asked Pope Pius XII in March 1950 to exert his influence on Francisco Franco to get him to step down from power.) Consequently, Spain was excluded from the new United Nations and its impoverished economy was not able to benefit from international loans and aid. The regime responded to the ostracism as if it were the victim of an injustice, insisting on the originality of its political system and highlighting the role of communism in the attacks it had sustained. Although the Western powers seemed unwilling to take military action against Spain, the opposition gained new momentum as a result of the international situation.

In June 1944, taking advantage of the dynamics of the war in Europe, the first guerrilla units of the Communist Party of Spain (PCE) began to infiltrate from France. The anarcho-syndicalist National Confederation of Labor (CNT) also created its own units. On the other hand, the monarchist opposition movement was reactivated with the publication of the so-called Lausanne Manifesto by Juan de Borbón, the son of the late Alfonso XIII. This renewal of the opposition was met with renewed repression.

=== The Republican institutional conflict ===
The end of the civil war had meant not only the total military defeat of the sectors that had opposed the rebel army led by General Franco, but also the complete division and confrontation between them and confusion as to who embodied the legitimacy of the republican institutions. The last session of the Cortes was held on 1 February 1939 in Figueres, where Negrín, a socialist, was ratified as prime minister. The fall of Catalonia a few days later meant that the highest Republican authorities had to take refuge in France. Negrín asked Manuel Azaña, who was then President of the Republic, to return to Spain and lead the resistance. However, Azaña refused and resigned from his post, claiming that the war was irretrievably lost and that the "numantine resistance" advocated by Negrín would only lead to the loss of more lives. The Permanent Deputation of the Cortes, during a meeting at La Pérouse restaurant in Paris on 3 March, took notice of Azaña's decision.

The president of the Cortes, Diego Martínez Barrio, was the one slated to replace Azaña, according to the Constitution. However, he decided not to take office, not only because the president's resignation had to be formally submitted to the Cortes but also because the political situation was becoming increasingly confusing in the area still under the control of the Republican faction. On 4 March, an uprising broke out in Cartagena against Negrín. Thus, the return to Spain presented a serious risk. Casado's coup d'état took place the next day. The confrontation between the two leaders materialized on 31 March, during a new meeting of the Permanent Deputation held in Paris one day before the official end of the war. Negrín expounded on his activities since the departure from Catalonia and said that he still considered himself the head of government despite the resignation of the president who had appointed him, on the grounds that his mandate had been ratified by the Cortes. He accused Martínez Barrio of having supported the "traitors" who followed Colonel Segismundo Casado. There was a tense confrontation between Martínez Barrio, Luis Araquistáin, and La Pasionaria. The Deputation considered the government as no longer existing. The meeting ended with the tense approval of a document, according to which the deputation considered itself to be fully legitimate and declared that the resignation of the Government could not have any effect because the institutions before which it should be submitted did not exist. Nonetheless, at a new meeting of the deputation held on 27 June 1939 in Paris, Negrín was expressly asked to resign as head of government.

=== Disagreements among the defeated ===
The clashes between the negrinistas (Note: English: Supporters of Juan Negrín) and the anti-negrinistas (Note: English: Opponents of Juan Negrín) continued with the creation of the Spanish Refugee Evacuation Service (SERE) (Note: Also, Servicio de Emigración de los Republicanos Españoles (Spanish Republican Emigration Service). It was the first organization to provide aid to Republicans in exile due to the Spanish Civil War. It was created in Paris in February 1939 under the administration of Juan Negrín.) and the Spanish Republican Relief Board (JARE) (Note: Created in France in July 1939 under Indalecio Prieto, with the purpose of managing resources and assets to provide aid for Spanish migrants leaving Spain "for having defended [the] country's democratic institutions.") to manage the republican economic resources. During the early years of World War II, Spanish exiles were more concerned with their own survival than with planning an opposition to Franco. Attempts to regroup were scattered. In October 1940, the strictly Republican left-wing parties created the organization Spanish Republican Action (ARE), (Note: Led by Diego Martínez Barrio) which encompassed them all. However, it did not manage to merge them, as they decided to reorganize individually. In 1941, the Communist Party of Spain (PCE) launched the National Spanish Union (UNE) (Note: An anti-Francoist organization created in France in 1942 with the purpose of joining forces to fight against the dictatorship.) which, although it formally included people from other political forces, was firmly controlled by the PCE. On his part, Negrín supported the creation of the Spanish Democratic Union (UDE) (Note: An anti-Francoist organization created in Mexico in February 1942 by initiative from the Communist Party of Spain, which grouped the pro-Negrín socialists and Republicans.) in 1942. The broader Spanish Liberation Junta (JEL) (Note: "The first relatively broad alliance of Republican forces in exile.") was created on 20 November 1943. It was composed of Republicans, Catalan nationalists, and socialists. This new organization was intended to confront both the PCE and its UNE, as well as the new monarchist opposition that was emerging in Spain and presented itself as an alternative to the dictatorship. Despite the absence of other forces, the JEL gained notable support from exiles, but it did not have a presence within Spain. Although it wanted to present a united republican front, the Junta did not claim to be the only legitimate option, unlike certain sectors. This meant that Indalecio Prieto and others preferred it. Lastly, the National Alliance of Democratic Forces (ANFD) was created in 1944, which also included the National Confederation of Labor (CNT). The PCE was invited to participate but declined, which meant that the new clandestine organization was clearly pro-Allies in nature.

In the final stages of the war, a strong anti-communist climate had been created in almost all parties, since they interpreted that, during the civil war, the PCE had obtained a greater share of power than it was entitled to. The German-Soviet Pact deepened this feeling due to the PCE's support for the double expansionism of Nazi Germany and the Soviet Union. This was compounded by the attempt by the Communists to monopolize the representation of the defeated through the UNE. Both the PCE and the Unified Socialist Party of Catalonia (PSUC) went through an intense process of internal purges and marked Stalinism. Anticommunism was especially pronounced in the Spanish Socialist Workers' Party (PSOE), both inside Spain and among the exiles in France and Mexico.

The defeat led to a radicalization of the Basque and Catalan nationalists, who sought pro-independence solutions for their respective territories. On 22 December 1944, after other actions and on the initiative of President José Antonio Aguirre, the Galeusca (Note: An acronym of Galicia, Euskadi and Cataluña) Pact was signed in Mexico by various Galician, Basque, and Catalan parties. It demanded sovereignty and the right to self-determination of their territories. Only Aguirre's return to Europe in March 1945 marked a greater pragmatism and defense of the republican institutions by the Basque Nationalist Party (PNV).

== The search for unity ==
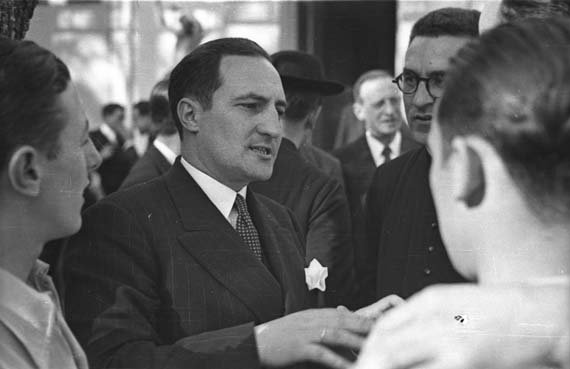
The initiative to seek representation on workers' committees came from José Antonio Aguirre, the president of the Basque Government.

The impending victory of the Allies caused the various republican factions to see an opportunity for the Francoist dictatorship to be swept aside at the same time as the Axis powers. The liberation of France, the improvement of communications between the Americas and Europe, and the increased expectations of the fall of the regime led to the revival of the opposition to Franco, not only the republican opposition, but also the monarchist and the traditionalist. However, there were still major differences regarding the goals to be pursued and the means to employ. José Antonio Aguirre, the president of the Basque Government in exile, was the one who proposed that the defeated faction attend the forthcoming San Francisco Conference with a single representation. He proposed including Diego Martínez Barrio as the president of the Republic and Juan Negrín as the head of government. Mexican President Manuel Ávila Camacho gave his full support for the Republican Cortes to meet in Mexico City on 10 January 1945. The chosen venue was Club France, which was granted the privilege of extraterritoriality for the occasion.

In attendance were 72 deputies, while 49 others participated by having submitted their vote in writing as specified in the agenda. Since Martínez Barrio knew that the PSOE was more in favor of keeping the Spanish Liberation Junta (JEL) than of reestablishing the institutions and that it was opposed to accepting a written vote, he limited the session to remembering those absent and postponed the meeting until the 19th. Nonetheless, the socialists were radically opposed to validating the votes in writing and maintained that there was not sufficient quorum to consider the meeting valid. Therefore, the first attempt ended there.

In addition, Negrín reappeared at the beginning of the year. Although he continued to defend the legitimacy of his administration, he stated that he was willing to resign from office at a meeting of the Cortes in which Martínez Barrio would be sworn in as president of the Republic. Only the PCE expressed support for his proposition.

As things stood, the divided Spanish exiles attended the San Francisco Conference. In attendance were a representation of the JEL, another of the Negrin administration, and a third of the Basque Government. All of them maintained that the Spanish war had been a prologue to the world war and that the happy ending of the latter would also allow for putting an end to the former. Although they had strong support from some delegations—such as the one from Mexico—the United Kingdom was perceived as being reluctant to condemn the Franco regime. Finally, on 19 June 1945, thanks to the help of the United States and France and at a proposal from Mexico, the assembly approved a resolution condemning regimes that had been imposed with the help of fascist nations, with the Mexican delegate expressly making it clear that this included Francoist Spain. In practice, this meant vetoing Spain's entry into the international organizations that were to manage the impending peace. The subsequent Potsdam Conference once again made it clear that Franco had been identified with the Axis and that Spain was out of the UN.

The PCE closed out the Spanish National Union (UNE) in June 1945. On the other hand, Negrín had told his Spanish colleagues during the Conference that he intended to resign. On 1 August, he gave a speech at the Palacio de Bellas Artes in Mexico, in which he vindicated his past actions, pointed out the damage made by the division in San Francisco, said it was a mistake to make changes to the government in exile, made a plea for harmony, and expressed his willingness to resign. On 8 August, the negrinistas and other sectors, with the reluctance of Indalecio Prieto's followers, asked Martínez Barrio to call a new session of the Cortes. On 16 August, the JEL declared itself in favor of a new call of the Cortes to form a government of unity. (Note: The JEL's attitude was probably due to socialist leader Indalecio Prieto being hospitalized after having undergone surgery. Prieto was very reluctant to the creation of a new republican government in exile.) Martínez Barrio summoned the surviving parliamentarians, but excluded the right-wing deputies who had supported Franco's side during the war. The following day, the new meeting of the Cortes took place in the Government Palace of Mexico.

== The formation of the government ==
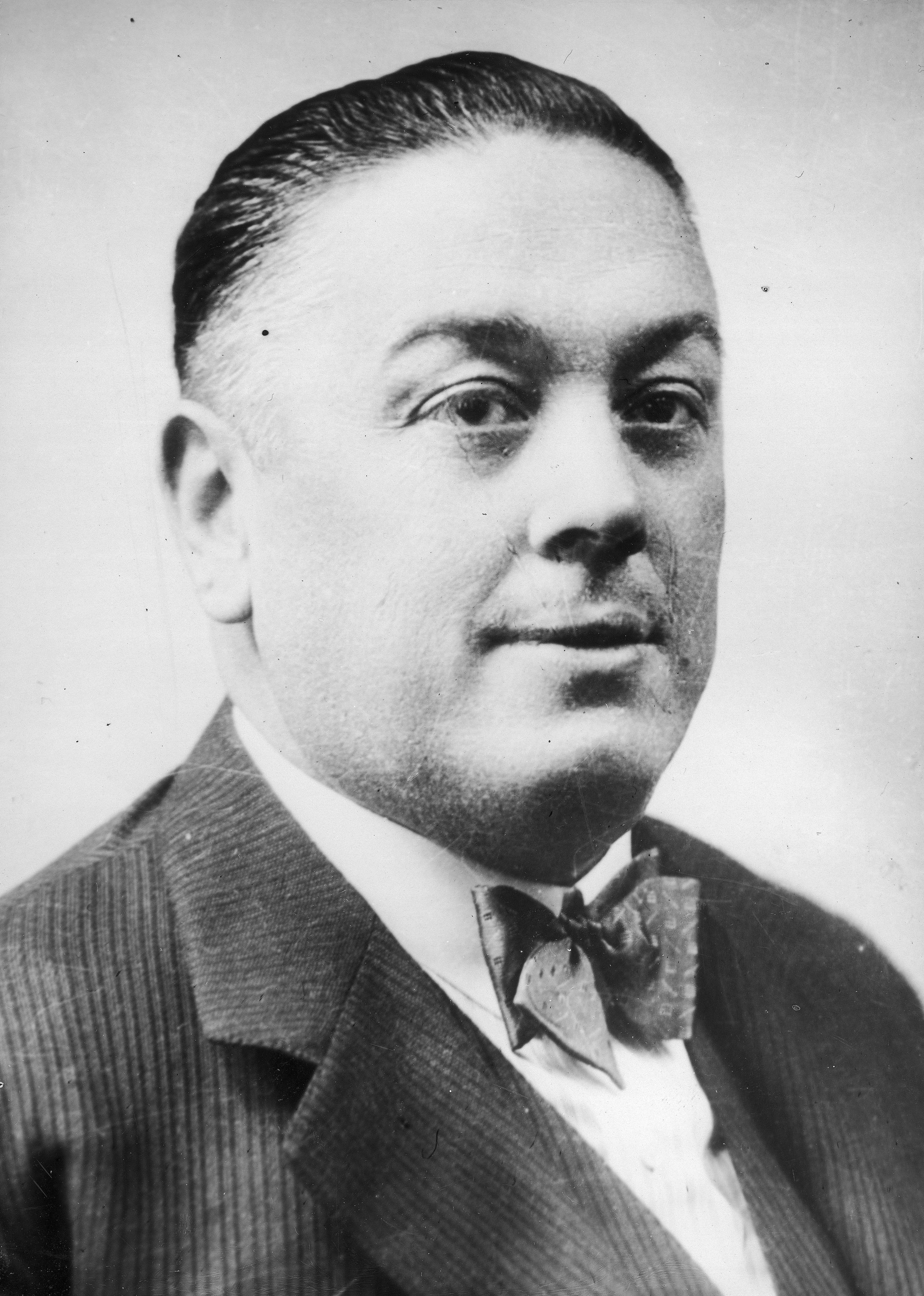
The inauguration of Diego Martínez Barrio as president made it possible to form a new government.

=== The consultations ===
The ceremony went according to plan. Diego Martínez Barrio was finally sworn in as president of the Republic and Negrín presented him with a letter of resignation. Immediately, Martínez Barrio opened a round of consultations which began with the resigning president himself. Negrín ran again for the position, claiming that it was necessary to form a very broad-based government:

[con] todos los partidos del régimen desde la más extrema derecha a la más extrema izquierda [siempre que no] hayan estado implicados en actos de rebelión, agresión ni hostilidad hacia la República y sus representaciones legítimas desde su advenimiento. (Note: English: [With] all the parties of the regime, from the most extreme right to the most extreme left [provided that they have not been] involved in acts of rebellion, aggression, or hostility towards the Republic and its legitimate representations since its arrival.)

This last phrase excluded Francoists, but also monarchists and casadistas (Note: Supporters of Segismundo Casado) On the other hand, it included the communists. Negrín's appointment was supported by the socialist faction that backed him, but also by the sector of the Republican Left (IR) headed by Mariano Ruiz-Funes, by Santiago Casares Quiroga, by Manuel Portela Valladares, and by Vicente Uribe representing the PCE. All of them alluded to the candidate's capabilities and the need to maintain continuity.

Other leaders—such as Augusto Barcia Trelles, Claudio Sánchez-Albornoz, and Felipe Sánchez Román—recommended another type of government. In short, others advocated for a generic conciliation, a position supported by the nationalists. But the decisive position was that of Prieto, expressed through Amador Fernández Montes, who said he preferred a republican of recognized prestige rather than a socialist. Moreover, he added that he was willing to [Brindar] la colaboración que los republicanos soliciten, con aquellas limitaciones que están fijadas por los acuerdos de nuestro partido, (Note: English: [Provide] the collaboration that the Republicans request, with those limitations that are established by the agreements of our party) which was a clear veto of Negrín.

=== Appointment of Giral ===
On 21 August, Martínez Barrio entrusted José Giral with forming a government, with the implicit suggestion of including members of the CNT and the PCE. This led Félix Gordón Ordás, president of Republican Union (UR), to protest. Giral offered the vice presidency and the state ministry to Negrín, but the proposal was rejected by both the former president and the PSOE. On its part, the PCE refused to be a part of a government not presided over by Negrín. The CNT demanded five seats in government, and Giral had a hard time convincing it to settle for two. However, the agreement to be a part of the government drove a deep wedge within the already precarious union. The reformist sector—which was in the majority in the interior and a part of the ANFD—was the one that agreed to take part in the executive branch, while the non-political sector—which was the majority in the exile faction—refused to participate and called itself the MLE-CNT. Both Indalecio Prieto and Josep Tarradellas refused to take part in the executive branch. The obstacles led Giral to submit his resignation, but the president renewed his mandate. Giral tried several times, without success, to change the communists' attitude. After a month of consultations, Giral finally announced the composition of his administration:

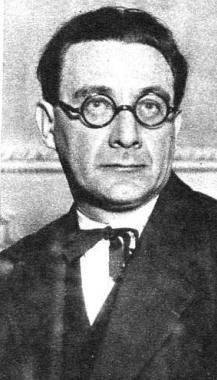
Lluís Nicolau d'Olwer, one of the catalanist ministers

- Presidency: José Giral (IR)
- State: Fernando de los Ríos (PSOE)
- Justice: Álvaro de Albornoz (IR)
- Treasury: Augusto Barcía Trelles (IR)
- War: Juan Hernández Saravia (military officer)
- State Education: Miquel Santaló (ERC)
- Industry and Commerce: Manuel de Irujo (PNV)
- Interior: Miguel Torres Campañá (UR)
- Emigration: Trifón Gómez (UGT)
- Agriculture: José Leyva (CNT)
- Public Works: Horacio Martínez Prieto (CNT)
- Without portfolio: Ángel Ossorio y Gallardo (moderate independent)
- Without portfolio: Lluís Nicolau d'Olwer (ACR)

The Government appeared before the Cortes on 7 November 1945, once again at the Salón de Cabildos of the Palace of Government. Giral set out his program and claimed that his government was el de más amplia base (Note: English: The most broad-based) that had been achieved. He also expounded on his aspirations that it would not be a party-based executive branch but rather it would be at the service of all Spaniards and made a reference to cómo y cuándo retornaremos a España. (Note: English: How and when we will return to Spain.) To achieve the reestablishment of the Republic, he spoke in favor of two procedures: resorting to international authorities and, in case of not succeeding this way, then resorting to the use of violence against the Franco dictatorship.

== The opposition ==
=== The negrinistas ===
During the sessions, which lasted three days, the negrinistas made it clear that they opposed the government. Ramón Lamoneda for the socialist faction, Luis Fernández Clérigo for the IR minority faction, and Vicente Uribe for the PCE recognized the legitimacy of Giral's appointment, but said that he was not the most suitable person to hold the position. The new president responded by asking what personal reproach could be made against him and recalling that those absent from the government were absent by their own choice and not his. The negrinista sector subsequently continued with its policy of active opposition, describing his program as anodino, insustancial y aun contradictorio, por no decir inexistente. (Note: English: Bland, unsubstantial, and even contradictory, let alone non-existent.) It accused him of having missed opportunities and discredited its members for representing:

[...] aquellos elementos que no tuvieron fe en nuestro pueblo..., que con su pesimismo dieron la espalda a la lucha, como después de haber sido traicionados los que combatían dieron por liquidada la causa de la República y la causa de España. (Note: English:[...] Those elements that did not have faith in our people… who, with their pessimism, turned their backs on the struggle, as after having been betrayed, those who were fighting gave up on the cause of the Republic and the cause of Spain.)

=== The prietistas ===
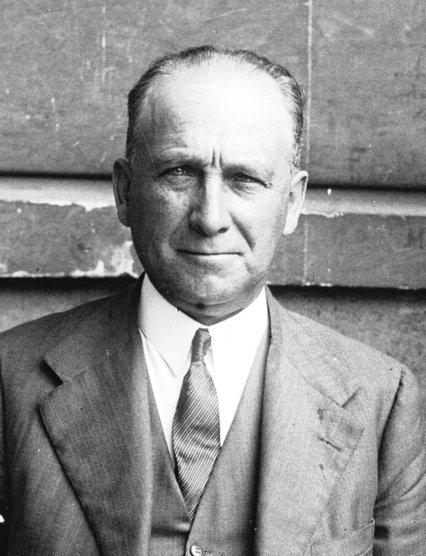
Prieto's criticism found the unexpected support of Francisco Largo Caballero.

Prieto's speech was gentler in form but had greater depth. He took advantage of an incidental matter to express his well-known reluctance to exclusively accept the republican legality as the only means to achieve freedom in Spain. Since 1938, the politician from Bilbao had been defending the need to resort to a referendum, a position he had taken up again in 1942 and 1944. Although he agreed that the Republican option was the one that was legally valid, he also recalled that the Republic had been missing for several years and that the nations that had won the war were not eager for its return. On 17 December 1945, he once again expounded on his ideas before the Socialist Youth. Prieto's position found unexpected support in his former adversary Francisco Largo Caballero. The latter wrote him a letter on 6 December in which he said:

Veo que el señor Giral está decidido a construir todo el armazón gubernamental. ¿Es que cree que su Gobierno es el que va a recibir el Poder? Si es así habrá que catalogarle entre los hombres más ingenuos del mundo. Eso es físicamente imposible. (Note: English: I see that Mr. Giral is determined to build the whole governmental framework. Does he believe that his government is the one that is going to receive power? If so, he will have to be ranked among the most naive men in the world. That is physically impossible.)

Largo went so far as to make representations to Giral and Martínez Barrio to persuade them of the convenience of holding a plebiscite. On 29 December, he published an article along these same lines. The combined position of both leaders would establish the line of the PSOE in the following months.

=== The opposition from within ===
The National Alliance of Democratic Forces (ANFD) had emerged as a unitary organization of the Republican opposition within Spain and responded to a dynamic and perception of reality that was very different from that of the exiled leaders. In fact, it had already carried out some initial exploratory contacts with the monarchist opposition. Giral tried to attract the Alliance to his cause by appointing José Leyva as minister. The CNT leader had participated in the creation of the ANFD. However, relations drifted apart over time. The ANFD's position was summarized in the opinion that una época de reconciliación y no de revancha (Note: English: An era of reconciliation and not of revenge) was needed, so maintaining the republican institutions was not the most appropriate thing to do.

=== The monarchists ===
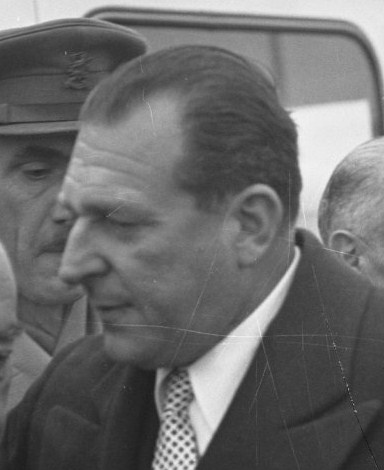
The pretender to the throne, Don Juan de Borbón, was the leader of the monarchists.

The monarchists, followers of Don Juan (the pretender to the throne), acted completely on the fringes of the exiled republicanism or the faction in the interior of the country. His followers were divided between a sector fully in favor of collaborating with Franco and another more in favor of parliamentary positions and distancing from the caudillo. Those who stood out in this second faction included the former CEDA leader José María Gil Robles and Franco's former minister Pedro Sainz Rodríguez. On 19 March 1945, as a result of the greater influence that the latter were gaining among their advisors, the Count of Barcelona had proclaimed the document known as the Lausanne Manifesto. It advocated for the establishment of a constitutional monarchy which, while offering peace of mind to the victors of the civil war, would be acceptable to the imminent victors in the Second World War. Although the number of monarchists was much smaller than that of Republican sympathizers, the fact that they belonged to the Francoist faction and their partial involvement in the dictatorship gave them a better chance of bringing about a change of regime. In September 1945, General Alfredo Kindelán, the main monarchist exponent within the Armed Forces, declared that he hoped that in six months there would be a peaceful restoration that would allow for:

[...] devolver a los españoles todas las libertades de que hoy carecen y el pleno disfrute de los derechos esenciales de la persona humana. (Note: English: The return to the Spaniards of all the liberties they lack today and the full enjoyment of the essential rights of the human person.)

The complex contacts between Franco and Don Juan allowed the latter to settle in Estoril. His arrival in the peninsula caused numerous significant personalities in Spain to "welcome" him. The monarchists came together in a Confederación de Fuerzas Monárquicas (Note: English: Confederation of Monarchist Forces) that intended to group all similar sectors. However, the talks with Franco ended abruptly. In February 1946, the pretender's contacts with the traditionalists resulted in a document called Bases de Estoril—or, more properly, Bases institucionales de la Monarquía Española (Note: English: Institutional Grounds for the Spanish Monarchy)—which was very conservative in tone, something that upset the left. General Antonio Aranda Mata himself, who maintained contacts with the latter sector, expressed his displeasure.

In general terms, the monarchists perceived the Republicans as rivals and their activity was aimed at gaining time to go against them. At that time, it was unthinkable to reach any kind of understanding between the two sectors.

=== Francisco Franco ===
Logically, the harshest opposition to Giral's government came from Franco's regime itself. The existence of a guerrilla movement caused the military to close ranks around the Generalissimo. For several years, Franco had created a dense network of mutual interests with most of the ruling class and a large part of the country's middle classes. In March 1945, he held a prolongued session of the Superior Council of the Army in which his fellow soldiers assured him of their support. Franco was aware that his situation was delicate. There is no indication that he was thinking of abandoning power.

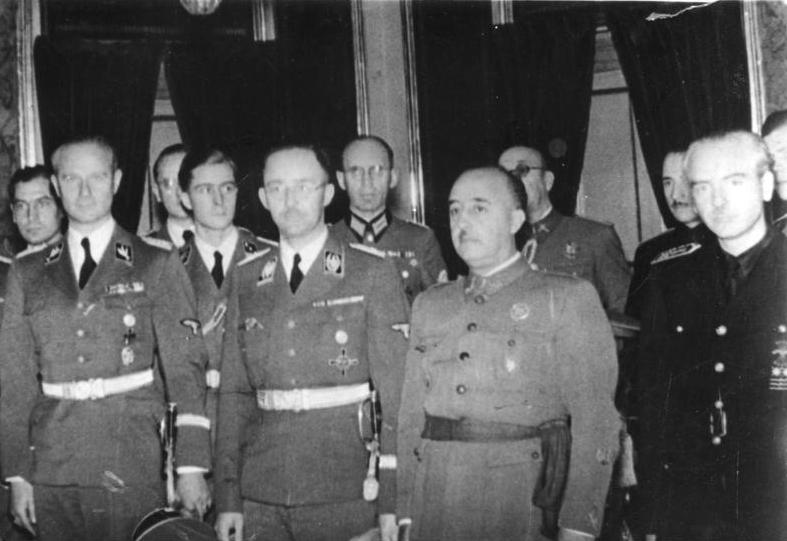
Franco made some reforms to mitigate the fascist image of his dictatorship. In the picture, he is with Heinrich Himmler in 1940.

Franco undertook certain reforms to change the fascist image of his regime to that of a Catholic, conservative, and anti-communist government subject to the law. On 17 July 1945, he enacted the law called Fuero de los Españoles (Note: English: Fuero of the Spaniards)—one of the Fundamental Laws of the Kingdom—which proclaimed a series of common rights in Western Europe, but which were limited by the legal principle that they could not go against the spiritual, national, and social unity of Spain. The following day, Franco appointed a new government, composed of people in whom he had absolute trust, which reduced the weight of the Falange. The main novelty was the integration of Alberto Martín-Artajo, a member of the Catholic Association of Propagandists, as minister of foreign affairs with the intention of strengthening the Catholic aspect of the executive branch. Martín-Artajo consulted with like-minded sectors before accepting the post and told them that there would be major changes in a few months. He told the ambassador of the United States that Franco should realize the need for his resignation. However, the changes were superficial: a draft law on associations did not prosper at the Cortes; on 20 October, an amnesty was announced for crimes perpetrated during the civil war; a few days later, a National Referendum Law was approved, and the fascist salute with the raised arm was abolished. Nonetheless, the single party was not eliminated.

Sectors of the regime maintained contacts with Giral's own minister of agriculture, José Leyva from the CNT, with the aim of reinforcing the pluralism of the Spanish Syndical Organization. The dictator received a report saying that Leyva was willing to leave Giral's government if the CNT was offered the freedom to proselytize. Franco rejected these conditions and the repression of anarcho-syndicalists resumed. The timid reforms ended with a new electoral law for the Cortes in March 1946.

The regime launched a wide-ranging campaign of external and internal propaganda. Joaquín Ruiz-Giménez toured the United Kingdom and the United States, talking to Catholic leaders; the Cardinal-Primate Enrique Plá y Deniel actively collaborated with the government; Franco himself made frequent and intense trips to various provinces to maintain contact with the population, and a communist presence was insisted upon in the wake of the international "anti-Spanish" campaign. Much of moderate public opinion in Spain closed ranks with Franco. The civil war was still too recent. Franco's message that national independence itself was at stake resonated with many Spaniards.

== Work of the government ==
The new government was recognized by several Latin American countries—Mexico, Guatemala, Panama, and Venezuela—as well as by several European states that already had or would soon have communist governments, such as Poland, Romania, Czechoslovakia, Hungary, and Yugoslavia. However, it did not obtain recognition from the major powers, not even from the Soviet Union. It was also not recognized by the United Kingdom, governed by Clement Attlee's Labour Party. In the case of France, there were times when its government was even reluctant to allow the presence of Spanish Republican leaders in its territory. As for the United States, the Truman administration expressly communicated to Giral's that it would not recognize it because it represented only one of the two sides in the civil war, and therefore lacked legitimacy. When on 4 March 1946, the United States, the United Kingdom, and France wrote a joint memorandum on the situation in Spain, in which they made it clear that they would not intervene in the country's internal affairs, Giral noted that they seemed to be addressing the Army, which he precisely considered to be responsible for the current situation of a lack of rights. (Note: The next day, Churchill gave his famous speech about the Iron Curtain that predicted the impending Cold War.) Lastly, his defense of the use of violence as a way to end the dictatorship did not enjoy international credibility despite the increased activity carried out by the Maquis at the time. In any case, the Western powers feared that if they acted energetically against Franco, they could destabilize his regime and lead to a new civil war, something that they did not want. Giral's goal was to achieve, at the United Nations, for the exclusion of Franco's government to mean the recognition of his own executive branch.

=== Transfer to Paris ===
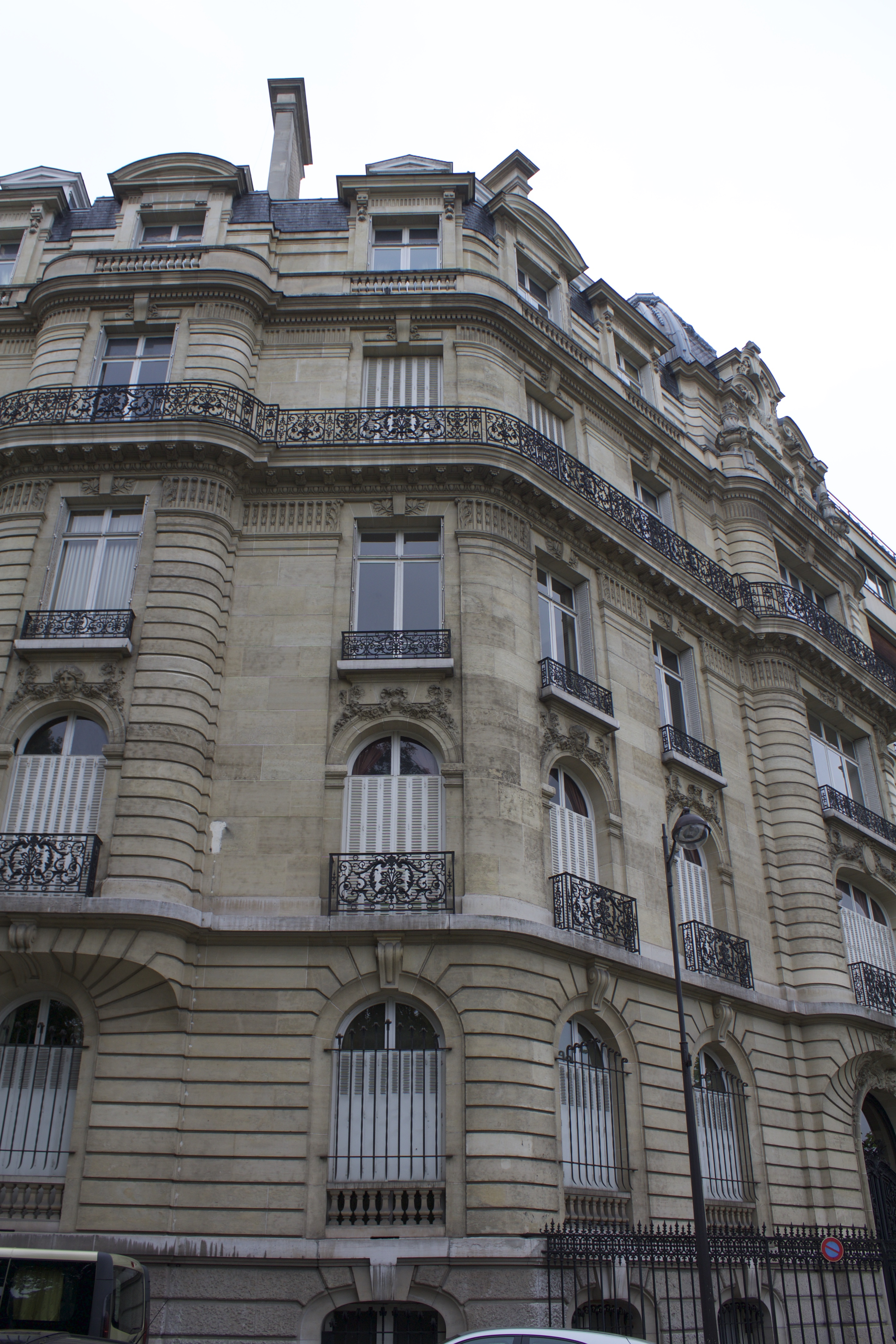
Number 35, Avenue Foch, in Paris, the official seat of the Presidency and the Government of the Republic in exile from February 1946 to June 1960 (when it moved to Boulevard Jean Jaurès, on the outskirts of Paris). The building was ceded by the French government and placed under its protection.

In late 1945, the government decided to move its headquarters from Mexico City to Paris. The international situation seemed favorable and there were prospects that the French government would soon recognize Giral's executive branch. (Note: The expectations were not realized and the French Government never recognized the Spanish Republican government in exile.) The French authorities expressly authorized the move and provided offices at Number 35, Avenue Foch, to serve as government headquarters. In addition, they provided several apartments in the Cité internationale universitaire de Paris as residences for the members of the Spanish Government, and granted subsidies and loans. For some Spanish ministers, who had experienced periods of great hardship during the war, the new situation represented a marked improvement in their living conditions. In December, the Foreign Policy Committee of the National Assembly began to discuss the possibility of recognizing the Giral administration, and on 18 January 1946, communist André Marty asked the chamber to send a French army to Spain to re-establish the republican regime. On the 23rd, General de Gaulle was relieved of his position by socialist Félix Gouin, who made a left-wing turn and expressed his support for Giral. On 1 March, the French government closed the border with Spain following the execution of Cristino García, a communist leader of the maquis who had previously fought in the French Resistance.

=== Expansion of the government ===
On 5 December 1945, the PCE decided to withdraw its support for Negrín and to negotiate with Giral. On the other hand, the latter tried to prevent the nationalists from continuing with their off-center tendency by promoting the study by the Cortes of the Galician Statute. Moreover, on 19 February 1946, he addressed a "Manifesto to the Spanish people" together with the Basque and Catalan presidents—Aguirre and Irla—in which they expressed their will to form a common republican front and reject any possible transition agreed with the monarchists. As a result, in April 1946, Galicianist Castelao and communist Santiago Carrillo joined the government as ministers without portfolio. For health reasons, Fernando de los Ríos had to be replaced by socialist Enrique de Francisco. In May, Giral further broadened the base of his government by integrating the conservative Catholic Rafael Sánchez Guerra, who had been Alcalá-Zamora's secretary. With this, the executive branch succeeded in integrating very diverse political tendencies.

=== The Cuban initiative ===
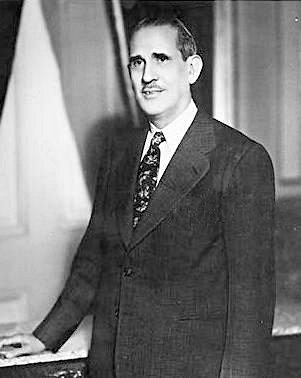
Ramón Grau, president of Cuba, attempted a mediation that was rejected by Giral.

Cuban President Ramón Grau San Martín wanted to set in motion a mediation that resembled Prieto's project. He proposed replacing General Franco with another ruler who had not been implicated in the persecution of Republicans, the dissolution of the Falange, the proclamation of an amnesty, the establishment of a regime of liberties, and a referendum held with guarantees and under the supervision of Latin American countries. Grau intended to present his proposal to the United Nations, but the idea was not specific enough about who was supposed to lead the transitional executive branch. The Giral administration refused to consider the project, which was never implemented.

=== The Maquis ===
The existence of an anti-Francoist Maquis operating inside Spain was a difficult issue for Giral's government to deal with. The period between 1945 and 1947 was one of great guerrilla activity—even with the existence of urban guerrillas in several cities—although with little effectiveness, which prevented the Maquis from obtaining the support or recognition of any State. Despite the fact that the Republicans, in the strict sense, and the nationalists were against the use of arms, both the PCE and the CNT were decidedly in favor of this option. The PSOE and the Workers' Party of Marxist Unification (POUM) also supported it, to a lesser extent. Except for the POUM, the other organizations had a presence in the government in exile. Even though the latter had opted—through Minister of War Juan Hernández Saravia—to prepare the organization of a professional army and did not consider the Maquis to be a priority, the truth is that it offered its support. While the primary objective was to achieve the fall of the dictatorship and the restoration of the Republic, and support for violent actions in Spain could compromise the diplomatic backing by other states, support for the guerrillas had a moral component. Aid was granted to the resistance and an attempt was made to create a single command both for the groups already inside the country and for those trying to gain access from France.

=== The Security Council ===
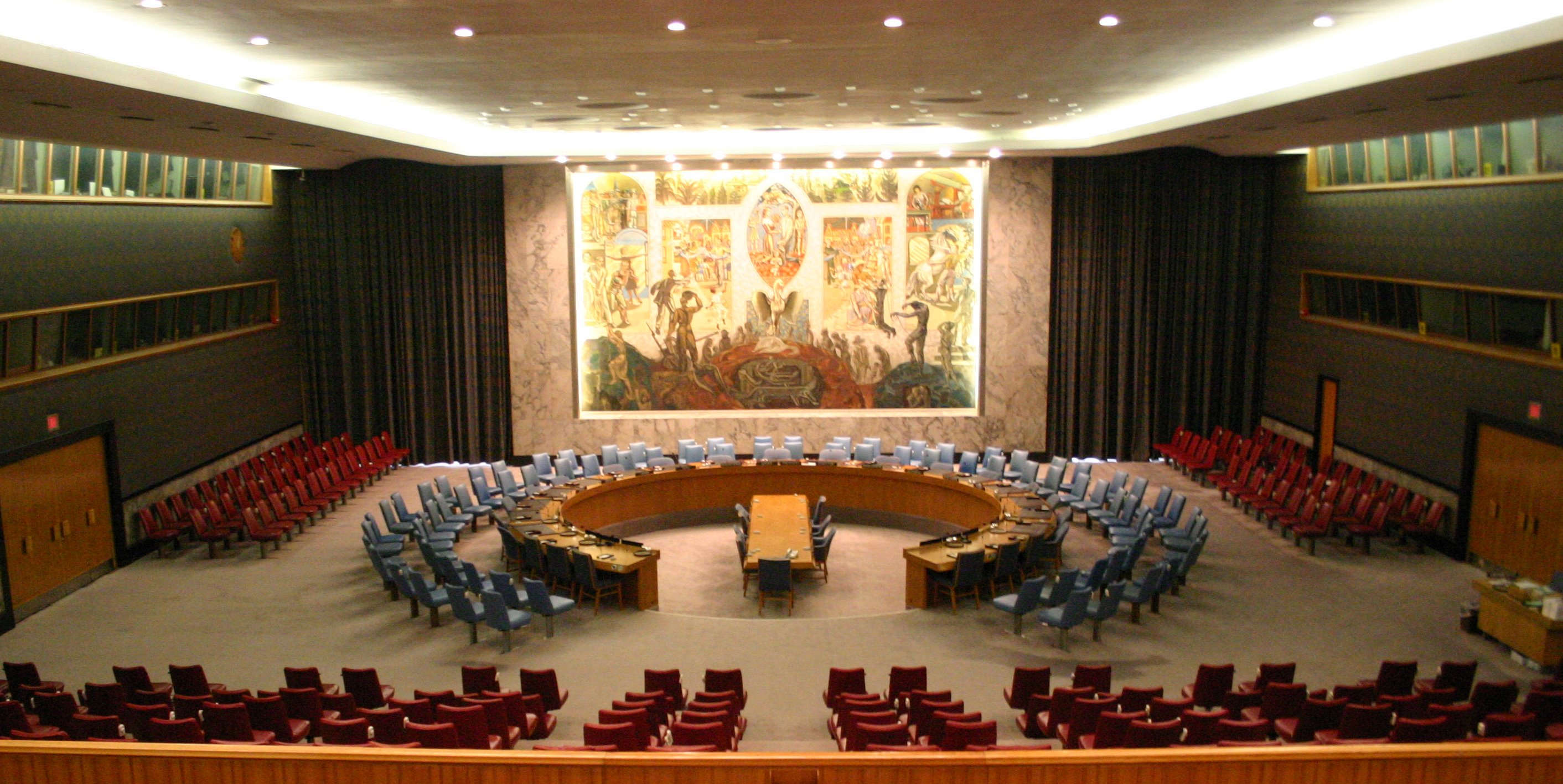
The UN Security Council was unable to adopt a resolution against Franco.

The UN Security Council debated the Spanish question in April 1946 at the suggestion of Poland. On the 29th, after considerable discussion and at the proposal of Australia, it was agreed to create a five-member sub-committee of inquiry that would issue a report before the end of May. The Giral administration submitted an extensive report and gave an oral presentation to explain its point of view during two sessions that lasted five and a half hours in total. Its reasoning focused on the fact that the Francoist regime represented a danger for world peace. Giral even repeated earlier statements by the Polish representative that Spain was conducting atomic experiments. He also stated that there were Gestapo agents operating in Spain who were in communication with a secret German army. He said that Franco was threatening France and that the budget allocated for defense was disproportionate.

Moreover, Giral argued that Spain's problem was also international because the Francoist regime dated back to the Non-Intervention Committee, and asked the UN to apply measures:

[...] el régimen español de Francisco Franco es el hijo de aquel periodo suicida que va desde los días del Comité de No Intervención.
[...] que las Naciones Unidas acuerden y apliquen aquellas medidas prácticas que permitan al pueblo español disponer libremente de sus destinos. (Note: English: [...] the Spanish regime of Francisco Franco is the son of that suicidal period that dates back to the days of the Non-Intervention Committee [...] the United Nations [have] to agree on and apply those practical measures that will allow the Spanish people to freely dispose of their destinies.)

He concluded by saying that, through its decisions, the UN could prevent a new civil war. At no point was the Franco government invited to express its opinion. Furthermore, Giral participated as a private individual and not as a representative of a government. Prieto and Sánchez Guerra criticized him for having echoed the statements made by Poland and it did him no favors in the eyes of the Western powers.

Other documents accusing the Franco regime were also presented, although the ones from the United Kingdom and the United States claimed that he did not pose a threat for international security. The United States said that there were no signs of the alleged German military presence in Spain, adding that the Spanish Army could not represent a threat due to its weakness. In turn, the United Kingdom said that it was false that a German expert in heavy water was working in a factory in Ocaña, Spain, that the Spanish military equipment was worthless, that no Gestapo activity had been detected, and that German companies were only supplying civilian material. It did criticize the Franco regime for not having authorized the extradition of some Germans who had been accused of being Nazis.

At this point, the expectations of the Giral administration were higher than ever. On 1 June, the subcommittee finished its report. It considered the Franco regime to be a potential danger to peace and recommended the severance of diplomatic relations. On 24 June, the Security Council discussed the matter for six hours, making clear the existing discrepancies between the former wartime allies. Due to matters related to the Council's attributions, the Soviet Union vetoed four times the proposals by the English-speaking countries. Its dissenting vote overrode the favorable vote by the other nine States for the motion for a resolution. The result was completely futile and a disappointment for the Spanish exiles. Fernando de los Ríos believed that the USSR and Poland had used the Spanish question as a political chip to confront their enemies, the French representative to the Council said "it seems to me that the ones who are fighting for Spain's freedom have fewer motives to congratulate themselves than Franco and his allies," and Hernández Saravia himself considered the USSR as responsible for the failure as the United Kingdom for having wielded its veto power. Giral returned to Mexico very angry at the result.

=== Relations with the ANFD ===
In March 1946, Giral had addressed the ANFD, asking it to consult with his administration before contacting "non-republican" individuals or organizations. He also suggested maintaining a government representative in the Alliance and vice versa. However, disagreements between the two organizations were on the rise. In July, faced with the cold attitude of the ANFD and the fact that it was starting to evaluate a rapprochement to the monarchist opposition, Giral openly asked it about the possibility of forming an intermediate government that stood between Franco's and his own. The Alliance warmed to the idea and even the libertarians were willing to participate. The ANFD was even in favor of the monarchists being in the majority in an eventual government after the restoration, in order to please the United Kingdom. On 10 August, faced with the confusing situation and the proximity of a new UN meeting, Giral issued a strong official statement defending the legitimacy of his government:

[...] el problema español debe resolverse con la desaparición del régimen franquista, la anulación de la Falange y la inmediata restauración de la República, que es el régimen político que votó el pueblo la última vez que pudo manifestarse libremente y por el cual lucha hoy. Situaciones transitorias o soluciones intermedias no las aceptamos ni mucho menos las propulsamos. (Note: English: [...] the Spanish problem must be solved by eliminating the Francoist regime, terminating the Falange, and immediately restoring the Republic, which is the political regime the people voted for the last time they were able to express themselves freely and for which they are fighting today. We do not accept, much less encourage transitory situations or intermediate solutions.)

The only consultation that the cabinet would accept was holding elections called by the legitimate government: the one presided by Giral. The issue divided the cabinet, as the Republican ministers and the communist one supported the president, Sánchez Guerra and the ones from the CNT abstained, and the socialists voted against.

=== The UN General Assembly ===
After the Council's failure, the Spanish question had to be debated by the UN General Assembly. Since it had been postponed by the Soviet Union, the government carried out a propaganda campaign in the meantime by sending cards to Secretary General Trygve Lie. The division was once again made clear by the fact that the PSOE did not collaborate in the mailing and chose instead to contact other socialist parties. Finally, on 12 December 1946, the Assembly approved Resolution 39 (I), by a large majority, in which it linked the origin of the Francoist regime to the aid from fascist powers, which it had reciprocated during World War II. Therefore, it recommended excluding Spain from international organizations and the immediate severance of diplomatic relations. It also pointed out the possibility that the Council could take further measures if freedom was not restored in Spain within a reasonable period of time. However, the resolution spoke of the installation of "a new and acceptable government." It implicitly confirmed the decision not to recognize the Giral administration as the legitimate government of Spain. The meeting of the Assembly had been preceded by an overwhelming show of support for the caudillo at the Plaza de Oriente. The resolution implied the withdrawal of the British ambassador in Madrid, the last remaining diplomatic representative in the Spanish capital.

== Fall of the government ==
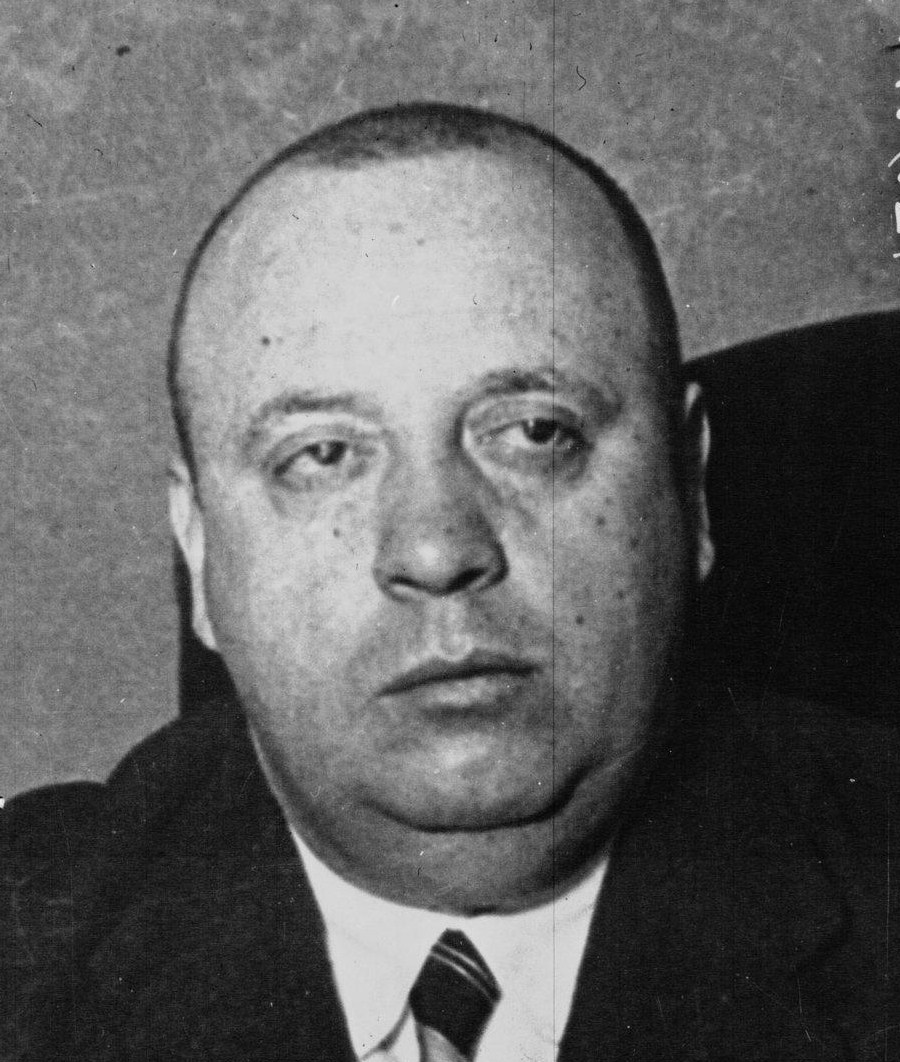
The criticism of the government by Indalecio Prieto was a decisive factor in its downfall.

The outcome of the UN deliberations caused the downfall of the government in exile. The position maintained by Indalecio Prieto—who was joined by Trifón Gómez in January— regarding the Giral administration had been gradually becoming more radical. Before the meeting of the General Assembly, he had already criticized the "bureaucratic proliferation" carried out by the cabinet. On 17 December, he gave a violent speech in Mexico City, in which he referred to the executive branch as being beyond recovery. On it, he stated that the government had no possibility of being installed in Spain and that it had never been more than a hindrance due to the pérdida de vitalidad (Note: English: Loss of vitality) of the republican institutions.

On 27 December, there was a cabinet meeting in which Giral stated he was contento, pero no satisfecho (Note: English: Content but not satisfied) about the Assembly's resolution. He believed it was necessary to continue gathering support and once again rejected the solución intermedia. (Note: English: Intermediate solution) In exchange, he said he was willing to accept a monarchist representation in the government despite confessing that it would be very uncomfortable for him. Referring to Prieto's attitude, he criticized certain parties for claiming to support the government while its leaders harassed him. The two socialist ministers said that the cabinet should renew trust in the President of the Republic and the Cortes.

A joint meeting of the executive leadership of the PSOE, of the UGT, and representatives from the interior of the country was held in Toulouse on 14–15 January 1947. The former ministers of the party, the parliamentary group, and the clandestine executive branch from the interior had been consulted beforehand. The position of the socialists, in favor of creating a new, smaller government and strengthening action in the interior of the country by making contact with other opposition forces, was set out in ten points. The government met once again on 21 January. The two socialist ministers submitted their resignation and were followed by the two from the CNT. Sánchez Guerra had already resigned beforehand. Giral submitted his resignation on the 26th. The government ceased to exist and a consultation was launched to conform a new one. Martínez Barrio tried to entrust the formation of a new government to Barcia Trelles, from Republican Left. However, this was rejected by the PSOE, the PNV, and the ERC, and thus he had to offer the position to socialist leader Rodolfo Llopis. The change in government meant abandoning the idea of continuation with the institutions that had fallen in 1939 and instead attempting to build a broad anti-Francoist coalition.

== See also ==
- José Giral
- Spanish Republican government in exile
- First Francoism
- Opposition to Francoism
- Spanish Republican exiles

== Bibliography ==
- Aroca Mohedano, Manuela (2004). "Un ministro para la Defensa de la República desde el exilio. Juan Hernández Saravia". Espacio, tiempo y forma. Serie V, Historia contemporánea. (in Spanish) (16): 269–290. ISSN 1130-0124.
- de Riquer i Permanyer, Borja (2007). La dictadura de Franco (in Spanish). Sabadell, Spain: Editorial Crítica. ISBN 978-84-9892-063-5.
- Fernández Rodríguez, Carlos (2004). "Madrid, ciudad clandestina". Cuadernos de historia contemporánea (in Spanish) (26). Madrid: Complutense University of Madrid: 127–142. ISSN 0214-400X.
- Heine, Hartmut (1983). La oposición política al franquismo. De 1939 a 1952 (in Spanish). Barcelona: Editorial Crítica. ISBN 84-7423-198-1.
- Mateos, Abdón (2009). La batalla de México. Final de la Guerra Civil y la ayuda a los refugiados, 1939–1945 (in Spanish). Madrid: Alianza Editorial. ISBN 9788420682679.
- Osorio Alonso, Elena (2010). "El exilio republicano español: Organizaciones de ayuda a los refugiados (1939–1945)". Spagna Contemporanea (in Spanish) (38). Turin, Italy: Institute of Historical Studies Gaetano Salvemini: 109–130. ISSN 1121-7480.
- Payne, Stanley G. (1987). The Franco regime, 1936-1975. Madison, Wisconsin: University of Wisconsin Press. ISBN 0299110702.
- Sánchez Andrés, Agustín (2023). "Reseña bibliográfica de Chaves Palacios, Julián, Restauración de las instituciones republicanas en el exilio. El gobierno de José Giral (1945-1947), Madrid, Centro de Estudios Políticos y Constitucionales, 2022, 480 pp". Revista de Indias (in Spanish). 83 (289). Spanish National Research Council: 863–866. doi:10.3989/revindias.2023.036. ISSN 0034-8341.
- Sánchez i Cervelló, Josep (2011). La Segunda República en el exilio (1939–1977) (in Spanish). Barcelona: Planeta. ISBN 978-84-08-10187-1.
- Suárez Fernández, Luis (2001). Franco, crónica de un tiempo. Vol. 3. Victoria frente al bloqueo. Desde 1945 hasta 1953 (in Spanish). San Sebastián de los Reyes, Spain: Editorial Actas. ISBN 84-87863-96-5.
- Suárez Fernández, Luis (2011). Franco. Los años decisivos. 1931-1945 (in Spanish). Barcelona: Editorial Ariel. ISBN 978-84-344-1332-0.
- Thomas, Hugh (1977) [1961]. The Spanish Civil War. New York: Harper & Brothers Publishers. ISBN 0060142782.
- Tusell, Javier (1977). La oposición democrática al franquismo (1939–1962) (in Spanish). Barcelona: Planeta. ISBN 9788432056314.
