= Ramón Rufat =

Anarcho-syndicalist, spy, writer (1916–1993)

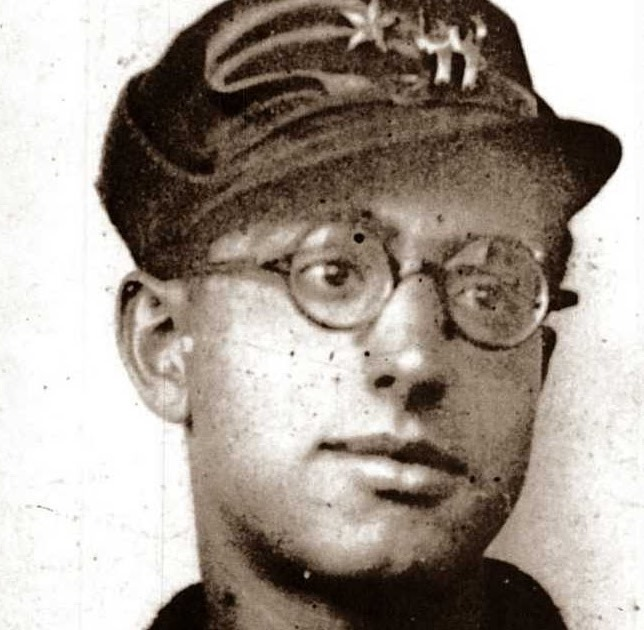

General Secretary of the Confederación Nacional del Trabajo
- (interior)
- In office April 1945 – July 1945 Serving with: Juanel Molina (until May 1945); Germinal Esgleas (from May 1945)
- Preceded by: Siegfried Catalá
- Succeeded by: José Expósito

Personal details
- Born: Ramón Rufat Llop; 28 December 1916 Vilanova i la Geltrú, Catalonia, Spain
- Died: 3 November 1993 (aged 76) Maella, Aragon, Spain
- Children: Pierre Rufat, Hélène Rufat Perelló
- Awards: Juan García Durán Award, 1986

Ramón Rufat Llop (1916–1993) was a Spanish anarcho-syndicalist, agent of the Republican secret services, and anti-Franco fighter.

== Biography ==
=== Anarcho-syndicalist commitment ===
Son of an Aragonese mason, his mother died of the Spanish flu in 1918 when he was 20 months old. In 1926, he was sent to Calanda (Teruel) for free education. Shortly before the elections of February 1936, Ramon Rufat joined the Libertarian Youth.

During the Fascist uprising, at the beginning of the Spanish Civil War, he went to Barcelona and joined the Durruti Column of Confederación Nacional del Trabajo (CNT) militiamen in their attempt to liberate Zaragoza (Aragon). In October 1936, he was a founder of The Children of the Night ("Los Hijos de la Noche"), a special group of the Servicio de Información Especial Periférico (SIEP) on the fronts of Aragon and Catalonia. Rufat was one of the 17 members of this most select group of the Intelligence service of the Second Spanish Republic.

Between October 1936 and December 1938, Rufat carried out more than 50 deep penetration missions behind the fascist lines of Aragon and Catalonia. He gathered intelligence by posing as a fascist officer, but always refusing to kill or wound anyone. He gradually built up a vast network of clandestine agents, couriers, smugglers, also exfiltrating militants and families trapped in the fascist zone. His intelligence contributed to the assassination attempts on Francisco Franco in Salamanca in January 1937 and then during the funeral of Emilio Mola in June 1937. On the Levant front, the information he provided to the Republican Army was crucial for the Zaragoza offensives (October 1936 and August 1937), the Battle of Belchite (September 1937), the Battle of Teruel (December 1937), the Aragon Offensive (March 1938) and the Battle of the Ebro (July 1938).

Knowing the war lost in the fall of 1938, Rufat nevertheless refused to give up the fight. He was denounced and then captured by the Francoist troops as he crossed the Guadalaviar (Turia) in the Sierra de Albarracín on a mission at the beginning of the Catalonia Offensive on 18 December 1938.

=== Clandestinity and inner resistance ===
On 4 March 1939, Rufat was sentenced to two death sentences: one for "espionage" based on his actions, and one for "perversity" based on his political commitment. In September 1940, the Belgian Red Cross provided Spain with a food boat in exchange for a list of 100 people to be pardoned. Rufat was at the top of the list and his sentence was commuted to life imprisonment. After several concentration camps (Santa Eulalia del Campo, Calataiud), interrogations, torture and mock executions, he managed to falsify his prison record and was released on parole on 10 August 1944. On the very same day, he went to the National Committee of proscribed Confederación Nacional del Trabajo (CNT), with which he had remained in contact during his imprisonment. He was immediately appointed Vice-Secretary of the Spanish Libertarian Movement, a clandestine coordinating structure that brought together the CNT, the Iberian Anarchist Federation (FAI) and the Iberian Federation of Libertarian Youth (FIJL).

Rufat was also put in charge of propaganda, relaunching the clandestine publications of the internal resistance of the Libertarian Movement (ML) and CNT, in particular Solidaridad Obrera, Fragua Social, Tierra y Libertad, which had been banned. In July 1945, the CNT-ML (interior) clandestinely held its national congress in Carabaña (near Madrid) with many regional delegates and reaffirmed the anti-fascist line of union. This resulted in its participation in the National Alliance of Democratic Forces and the appointment of Horacio Prieto and José Exposito Leiva as representatives of the CNT to the Republican government-in-exile of José Giral. This was the "golden age" of the anarchist resistance to Franco's regime, with a wide distribution of the underground press in the regions, the first major strikes in 1945 in Barcelona and then in Vizcaya, the first demonstrations, and then the resumption of urban guerrilla warfare, notably with attacks on banks.

After the arrest of Sigfrido Catalá Tineo, Rufat became general secretary of the CNT-ML (interior). He continued the underground revolutionary struggle until he was arrested alongside the whole clandestine Ninth CNT National Committee on 6 October 1945 in Madrid by the Francoist Political-Social Brigade.

=== "All of Spain is a prison" ===
Rufat was sentenced by the war council of 21 March 1947 to 20 years in prison. Interrogated and tortured in Madrid, he was then incarcerated in the prisons of Alcalá de Henares, Yeserías, Ocaña, then 11 years at El Dueso. At the end of the 1940s, up to seven national committees of the CNT-ML (interior) were simultaneously imprisoned at the Ocaña prison. Anarchist resistance was organized from inside Franco's prisons. Getting provisional freedom in 1958, literally 20 years after his 1938 arrest, Rufat escaped across the Pyrenees to start a new life in France.

=== Exile and the protection of refugees ===
In France, he worked for the Office for the Protection of Political Refugees (OFPRA) of the French Ministry of Foreign Affairs. He participated in the creation of the Polémica and Anthropos journals and wrote for many other French- and Spanish-language publications. When returning to Barcelona in 1976, after the death of dictator Francisco Franco, he discovered that according to the archives, he had been executed twice, in 1938 and 1940. Rufat struggled to convince the new democratic authorities that, in spite of his clandestine activities, he was still alive. This led him to devote the rest of his life to writing "the history of the defeated", in particular by collaborating with the Bibliothèque de documentation internationale contemporaine (BDIC) at the University of Nanterre. Rufat was also an actor and writer, known for the movie Larga noche (1977). Many of his manuscripts, texts and memoirs remain unpublished although he won the Juan García Durán Award in 1986.

== Works ==
- La filosofía del yo y del nosotros (1958)
- En las prisiones de España (1966) 1st edition, Mexico
- Entre los hijos de la noche (1986) Juan García Duran Award
- Espions de la République (1990)
- La oposición libertaria al régimen de Franco (1993)
- En las prisiones de España (2003) Revised and expanded edition, Zaragoza.
