= Spanish Libertarian Movement =

Spanish anarchist organisation

- Movimiento Libertario Español
- Formation: 26 February 1939; 87 years ago
- Founder: CNT, FAI, FIJL
- Type: Social movement

The Spanish Libertarian Movement (Spanish: Movimiento Libertario Español, MLE) was a Spanish anarcho-syndicalist organization founded at the end of the Spanish Civil War by the CNT, the FAI and the FIJL to develop a joint clandestine activity in the interior of Spain, under the Francoist dictatorship, and legal activity in exile, where it dealt with the thousands of anarcho-syndicalist refugees in France. The MLE national council settled in Paris, with Germinal Esgleas acting as general secretary after the death of Mariano Rodríguez Vázquez on 18 June 1939.

== History ==
=== Birth ===
On 26 February 1939, after the fall of Catalonia, the CNT, the FAI and the FIJL established the Spanish Libertarian Movement in France, so that from then on the three anarchist organizations acted jointly, especially regarding the assistance to the thousands of anarcho-syndicalist refugees who were in France. The initiative had come from a plenary session of the regional committees of the three components. However, the anarchists who continued to fight in the Center-Levant area denounced the national council of the ML, claiming they only represented Catalan and Aragonese anarchists and, above all, that it was dominated by those who opposed the "collaborationists" - those in favor of continuing to participate in republican institutions, led by anarchists who until then had held positions in the State, such as Federica Montseny - Minister of Health in the government of Largo Caballero, Francesc Isgleas i Piarnau - former Defense Minister of the Catalan government, and Valeri Mas i Casas - Minister of Economy of Catalonia. The dominance of the MLE national council was reinforced with the resignation of Horacio Martínez Prieto, defender of "collaborationism" or "reformism," and the death of Mariano Rodríguez Vázquez, whose post as secretary general was occupied by Germinal Esgleas. The rest of the members of the national council were Germinal de Souza, Pedro Herrera Camarero, Roberto Alfonso, Juan Gallego Crespo, Rafael Iñigo, Serafín Alaga, José Xena, Juan Rueda Ortiz and Juan García Oliver. Some of them emigrated to the Americas and others remained locked up in French concentration camps or enlisted in auxiliary units of the French Resistance.

=== Clandestine activity and repression ===
The first clandestine activity of the Libertarian Movement was carried out by the FIJL in Madrid during the first weeks of the postwar period thanks to the fact that one of its members, named Escobar, had infiltrated the Falange of the Puente de Vallecas, achieving certificates of good conduct and declarations of having belonged to the "fifth column", which, filled in with the pertinent names, allowed the release of several anarchists from the Albatera concentration camp.

One of the people who was released thanks to these documents was Esteve Pallarols i Xirgu, who immediately contacted three libertarian leaders who were hiding in Valencia — José Cervera Bermell, Luis Úbeda Canero and Leoncio Sánchez Cardete. The four of them constituted the interior national committee of the Libertarian Movement. His first activity was to falsify documents that allowed the liberation of more libertarian prisoners from the Albatera camp and from other camps in Valencia, who were quickly transferred to Barcelona and from there to France. To cover up the trips, the front company "Frutera Levantina" was created, officially dedicated to the transport of fruit from Valencia to other parts of Spain. The task of creating links in Catalonia and the south of France was entrusted to Génesis López and Manuel Salas, both recently released from the Albatera camp, who made contact with leaders of the Libertarian Movement in Nimes. Later, López was taken to Paris where he met with the general secretary of the national council, Germinal Esgleas, his partner Federica Montseny, and some other libertarians. But López only got an insignificant amount of money, 10,000 francs, which only served to finance the passage to France of fifteen people.

When López returned to Barcelona he found out that Pallarols had been arrested in Valencia by the Francoist police along with other colleagues. Eleven of the detainees were tried years later, being sentenced to long prison terms. In a separate case, Pallarols was sentenced to 18 years in prison, but was tried again, this time accused of alleged earlier crimes, and sentenced to death - he was shot on 18 July 1943. After Pallarols' arrest, a new national committee for the interior was formed, headed by Manuel López López, but he resigned shortly after due to the tuberculosis he had contracted during his stay in the Albatera field, being replaced by Celedonio Pérez Bernardo.

The Francoist police also managed to destroy part of the Madrid group of the FIJL. Towards the end of February 1940, 33 of its components were arrested and the weapons depots dismantled. The young Escobar was handed over to the Falange, whose members took him to a field on the outskirts of town, where they hanged him. He was saved because a peasant cut the rope after the Falangists left believing he was dead.

At the beginning of 1941, Celedonio Pérez Bernardo was arrested by the police, being tried in September of the following year and sentenced to thirty years in prison. He was replaced by Manuel Amil Barcia, but he, haunted by the police, had to leave Madrid to take refuge in Andalusia. The functions of the national committee were assumed by the Madrid organization headed by Eusebio Azañedo, who entered contact with the CNT of Valencia, which had been reorganized, and with that of the CNT of Catalonia, whose situation was rather confused due to the existence of two regional committees: an anarcho-syndicalist majority and a minority in favor of sticking to union activities that did not exclude participation in the Spanish Syndical Organization. This minority was made up of former members of the Syndicalist Party, including Eliseo Melis, who was suspected of being a confidant of the Francoist police. The information that Melis provided to the police led to Acebedo's arrest in Madrid in the summer of 1943, so Amil returned to the capital to take over again as general secretary of the national committee. It was endorsed at a clandestine meeting that was held on the outskirts of Madrid and in which Gregorio Gallego was elected the first general secretary of the FIJL since the end of the war. During the 1940s, Sigfrido Catalá Tineo, Ramón Rufat Llop and José Expósito Leiva were among those who organized internal resistance, propaganda and exfiltrations. They were regularly arrested or executed.

=== Integration in the National Alliance of Democratic Forces (ANFD) ===
The libertarians flatly rejected the PCE's proposal to join the Spanish National Union, which facilitated the rapprochement with the socialists, who also opposed the hegemony that the communists intended to impose. Thus, in the autumn of 1943, representatives of the Libertarian Movement and the PSOE began talks aimed at creating a unitary body of the non-communist left, which would be open to all other anti-fascist forces. In February 1944, a plenary session of the regional committees of the CNT supported the talks by approving the maintenance of the "collaborationist position". The conversations between socialists and libertarians were joined by Republican politicians from the Republican Left, Republican Union and Federal Republican Party, integrated into the so-called National Republican Committee, founded and headed by Rafael Sánchez-Guerra and Régulo Martínez. The agreement between the three parties was reached in June 1944, although it was not made public until October. In the founding manifesto of the so-called National Alliance of Democratic Forces (ANFD) the "accidentalism" of the libertarians on the form of government was resolved by resorting to the expression "republican order" to refer to the Second Republic. To lead the ANFD, a national council was created chaired by the republican Régulo Martínez, who had been released from prison a few months before, and which also included the socialist Juan Gómez Egido and the libertarian Sigfrido Catalá.

In the last months of 1944 the three members of the ANFD national committee began negotiations with the monarchist generals Antonio Aranda, Alfredo Kindelán, Andrés Saliquet and Alfonso de Orleáns y Borbón in which they discussed what type of regime would replace the Spanish State, which they were convinced would not survive the imminent Allied victory. The generals wanted the ANFD to accept the restoration of the monarchy without first going through intermediate formulas and without a referendum on the form of government, something that libertarians could assume but republicans and socialists could not, which led to a dead end. But their final failure was mainly due to the wave of arrests carried out by the Francoist police in late 1944 and early 1945. On the night of 21-22 December, the president of the ANFD Régulo Martínez was arrested, as well as other members of the ANFD steering committee, the Republican National Committee, and prominent monarchists who had maintained contact with them. In March 1945 Siegfried Catalá, a libertarian representative on the ANFD board, and other members of the MLE national committee were arrested. Almost at the same time, the entire PSOE executive from the interior fell.

However, the Libertarian Movement quickly recovered from the coup that led to the arrest of Siegfried Catalá, since a new national committee had already been formed in April headed by Ramón Rufat Llop and José Exposito Leiva.

=== Crisis and division of the Libertarian Movement from exile ===
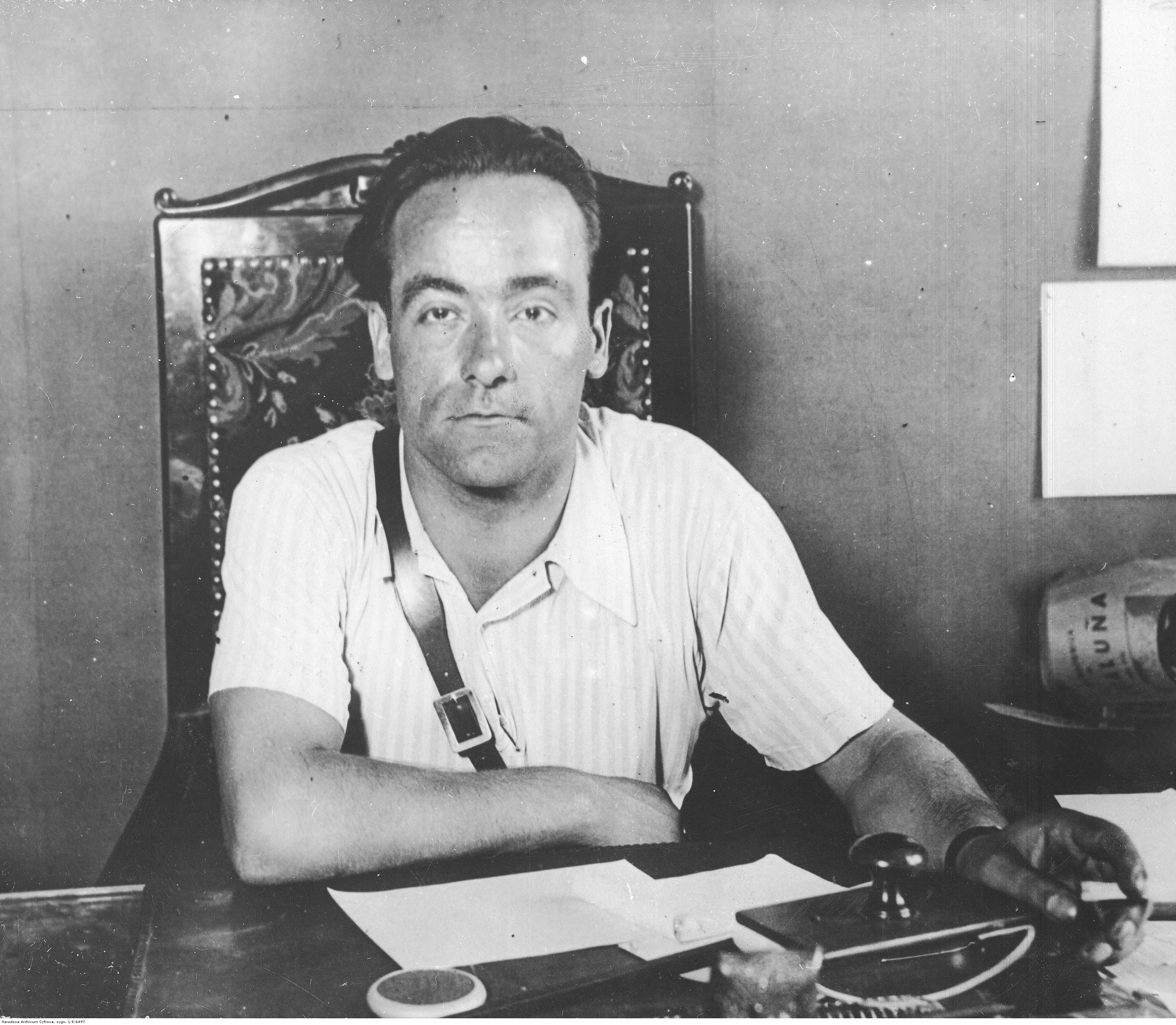
Juan García Oliver, leader of the "collaborationist" sector of the Libertarian Movement, when he was Minister of Justice of the Largo Caballero government during the Spanish Civil War.

The Libertarian Movement in exile experienced a serious crisis in the spring of 1942, when latent tensions erupted between the "collaborationists" led by Juan García Oliver and Aurelio Fernández, and the "apoliticals" who supported the Paris-based national council headed by Germinal Esgleas and Federica Montseny. At the meeting held in Mexico, the former presented a document for discussion entitled "Ponencia" but they were defeated, so they decided to form their own organization, a new CNT, which ran the CNT newspaper, while the mouthpiece for the "anti-collaborationists" was Solidaridad Obrera.

== Bibliography ==
- Heine, Hartmut (1983). La oposición política al franquismo. De 1939 a 1952 (in Spanish). Barcelona: Crítica. ISBN 84-7423-198-1.
