= Antonio Ortega (soldier) =

Spanish colonel (1888–1939)

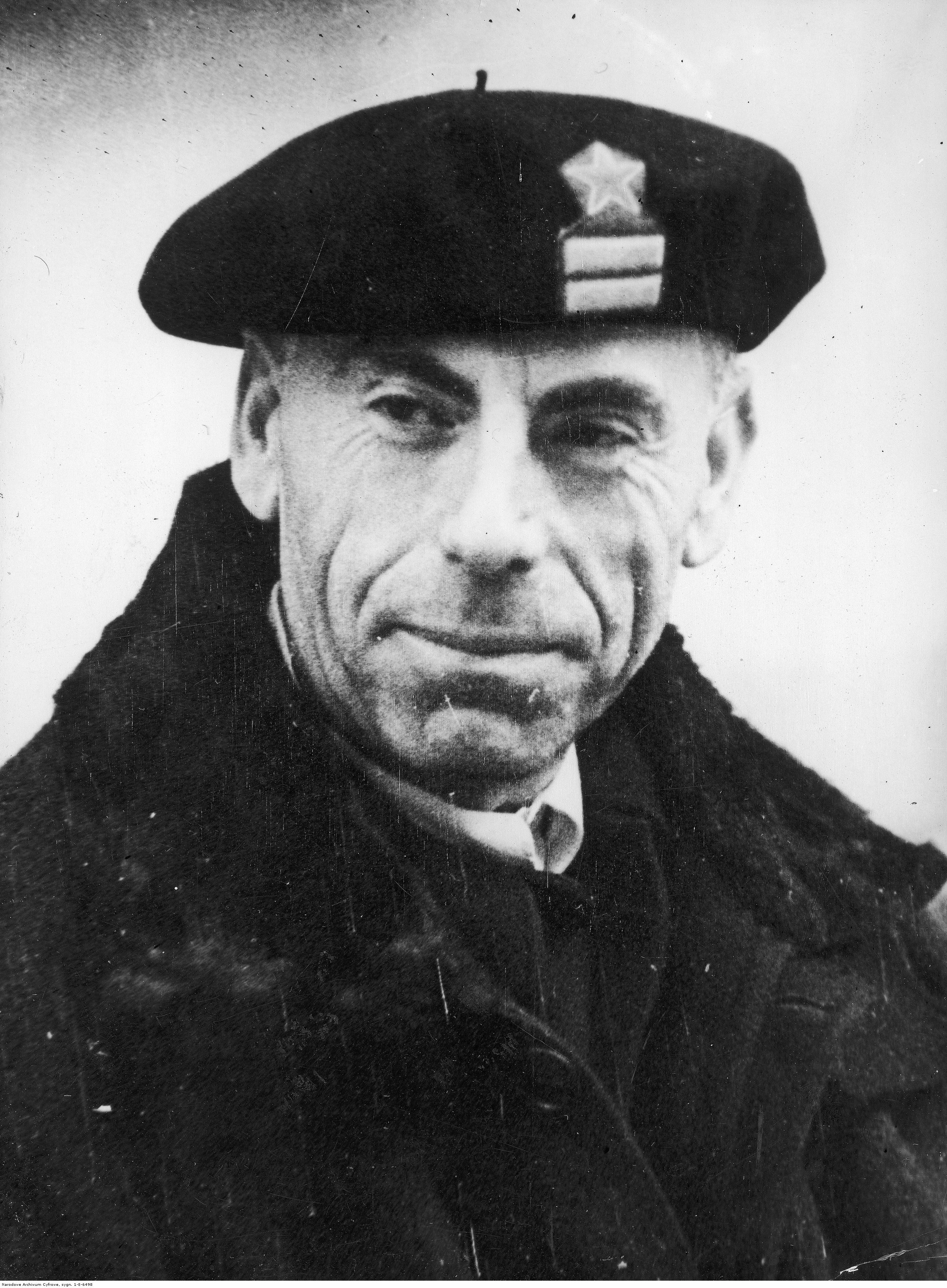
- Antonio Ortega in 1937
- Born: Antonio Ortega Gutierrez; 17 January 1888; Rabé de las Calzadas, Burgos, Spain
- Died: 15 July 1939 (aged 51); Alicante, Spain
- Military career
- Allegiance: (Second Spanish Republic) Spanish Republic
- Branch: Army
- Rank: Colonel
- Commands: Civil Governor of Guipuzcoa (1936); Secretary of Security (1937); III Army Corps of the Army of the Centre (1939)
- Conflicts: Campaign of Gipuzkoa; Battle of Irún; Final offensive of the Spanish Civil War (executed)

Antonio Ortega Gutiérrez (17 January 1888 – 15 July 1939) was a Spanish Republican military officer. He was directly involved in the defence of Madrid during the Spanish Civil War. He was also acting president of Madrid Football Club between 1937 and 1938.

== Spanish Civil War ==
A professional officer of the Spanish Army, he supported the Republican government during the Spanish Civil War. Before the war he was a lieutenant of Carabineros of the Second Spanish Republic stationed in Irún. On 6 August 1936, following the Coup, he was appointed civil governor of Gipuzkoa. He took command of the Republican forces during the later part of the Campaign of Guipúzcoa after the capture of Augusto Pérez Garmendia at Oiartzun. In 1937 he was appointed secretary of security and joined the Communist Party of Spain. He was also, among other things, responsible for the arrest of Andreu Nin and because of this, was dismissed by the minister of the interior, Julián Zugazagoitia; he was eventually transferred to field command. In March 1939, he was the commander in charge of the III Army Corps of the Army of the Centre and supported Luis Barceló against the National Defence Council (Consejo Nacional de Defensa) during what later became the final offensive of the Spanish Civil War. At the end of the war, he was captured by the Nationalists, sentenced to death by a military tribunal and subsequently executed by firing squad in Alicante on 15 July 1939.

== President of Real Madrid ==
As President of Madrid Football Club, as Real Madrid were called during the Second Spanish Republic, he acted on behalf of Rafael Sánchez Guerra, a prominent Republican, who was unable to take an active role in managing the club due to the war. Ortega took over as acting president from another Republican, Juan José Vallejo. Together with Gonzalo Aguirre and Valero Rivera, Madrid Vice President and Treasurer, respectively, he was among several Real Madrid board members, captured and executed by Franco's Nationalists, following the city of Madrid's fall.

| Preceded by Rafael Sánchez Guerra | Chairman of Real Madrid; 1937–1938 | Succeeded by Rafael Sánchez Guerra |

== Sources ==
- Romero, Eladi, Itinerarios de la Guerra Civil española : guía del viajero curioso, Barcelona : Laertes, 2001, 600 p.
- Barruso, Pedro, Verano y revolución. La guerra civil en Gipuzkoa (julio-septiembre de 1936), Edita: Haramburu Editor. San Sebastián, 1996.
- Hugh Thomas (2001). The Spanish Civil War. Modern Library. ISBN 0-375-75515-2.
- Morbo: The Story of Spanish Football (2003), Phil Ball.
- List of missing persons
