= Rodolfo Llopis =

Spanish politician

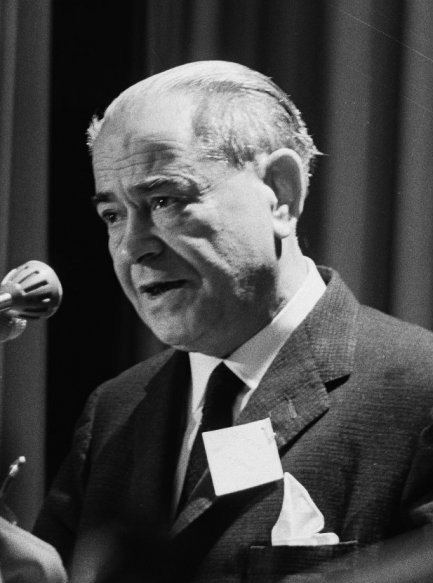
Rodolfo Llopis in 1963

Rodolfo Llopis Ferrándiz (27 February 1895, Callosa d'En Sarrià, Alicante, Spain – 22 July 1983, Albi, France) was a Spanish socialist politician. He was the General Secretary of the Spanish Socialist Workers' Party in exile from 1944 to 1974.

In 1947 he succeeded José Giral as prime minister of the Spanish Republican government in exile. Álvaro de Albornoz y Liminiana succeeded him the same year. Prior to this, from 1931 to 1936, he was a Deputy representing Alicante and briefly Madrid.

During the period of the Spanish Second Republic, Llopis was heavily involved with primary education reforms. His achievements in this role were great and this, combined with his dapper appearance and youth, earned him the title of "the Rudolph Valentino of pedagogy."
