= Germinal de Sousa =

Portuguese anarchist

- Born: 22 May 1906; Porto, Kingdom of Portugal
- Died: 3 November 1968 (aged 62); Lisbon, Estado Novo
- Political party: Federación Anarquista Ibérica
- Movement: Anarchism

Germinal de Sousa (born 22 May 1906 in Porto, died 3 November 1968 in Lisbon) was a Portuguese anarchist and secretary of the Iberian Anarchist Federation's Peninsular Committee. He oversaw the FAI's collaboration with the government of the Spanish Republic up until late 1938, when he broke with the leadership of the CNT over the matter.

== Biography ==
After the establishment of the Federación Anarquista Ibérica (FAI), de Sousa joined Ángel Pestaña's group Solidaridad, which went on to form the core of the Treintista movement that opposed the radicalism of the FAI. In 1935, de Sousa was himself elected to the Peninsular Committee of the FAI, serving alongside Diego Abad de Santillán, Ildefonso González, Pedro Herrera and Fidel Miró.

By the outbreak of the Spanish Civil War, de Sousa had become the secretary general of the FAI. From this position, De Sousa approved the decision by the Confederación Nacional del Trabajo (CNT) to join the government of Francisco Largo Caballero. When the FAI joined the national committee of the Popular Front on 31 May 1938, de Sousa and Abad de Santillán were appointed to it as delegates.

By October 1938, the FAI had finally broken with the leadership of the CNT over the latter's continued support for the Republican government of Juan Negrín. De Sousa himself criticised Mariano R. Vázquez, the Secretary General of the CNT, for having condemned the FAI's anti-government position, stating that it had been formed based on the "opinion of various political and military personalities".

Disturbed by the authoritarianism of the Communist Party of Spain (PCE) during the civil war, de Sousa opposed forming a united front with the Portuguese Communist Party (PCP) against the Estado Novo, instead preferring to cooperate with the socialists and the democratic republicans.

== Bibliography ==
- Alexander, Robert J. (1999). The Anarchists in the Spanish Civil War. London: Janus Publishing Company. ISBN 1-85756-412-X.
- Christie, Stuart (2000). We, the Anarchists! A Study of the Iberian Anarchist Federation (FAI) 1927-1937. Hastings: Meltzer Press. ISBN 1901172066. OCLC 803517498.
- Guimarães, Paulo Eduardo; Freire, João Paulo (2010). "Syndicalism and Anarchism in Portugal, during the Interwar Period: Struggles, Ideological Competition, and Repression". Anarchist Elites. II. Ghent: European Social History Conference.
