= National Alliance of Democratic Forces =

Anti-dictatorship organization in Francoist Spain

The National Alliance of Democratic Forces (ANFD) was an anti-Francoist organization created in October 1944, during the first years of Francoist Spain, by ideologically diverse Spanish political and trade union organizations (republican, socialist and anarchist) who had fought together on the Republican side during the Spanish Civil War. Its founding objective was to end the Franco dictatorship and restore democracy.

== History ==
=== Founding ===
Both the socialists and the anarchists rejected the Communist Party's (PCE) proposal to join the Spanish National Union. This opposition to the hegemony that the communists intended to impose, combined with the common struggle against the Franco dictatorship, brought the socialist and anarchist movements together, despite previous differences during the Republic and the Civil War. Thus, in autumn of 1943, representatives of the Libertarian Movement and the Socialist Workers' Party (PSOE) started talks aimed at creating a united body of the non-communist left, which would be open to other anti-Franco forces from moderate political forces. In February 1944, a session of the regional committees of the Confederación Nacional del Trabajo (CNT), the main organization of the Libertarian Movement, supported the talks by approving maintaining the "collaborationist position."

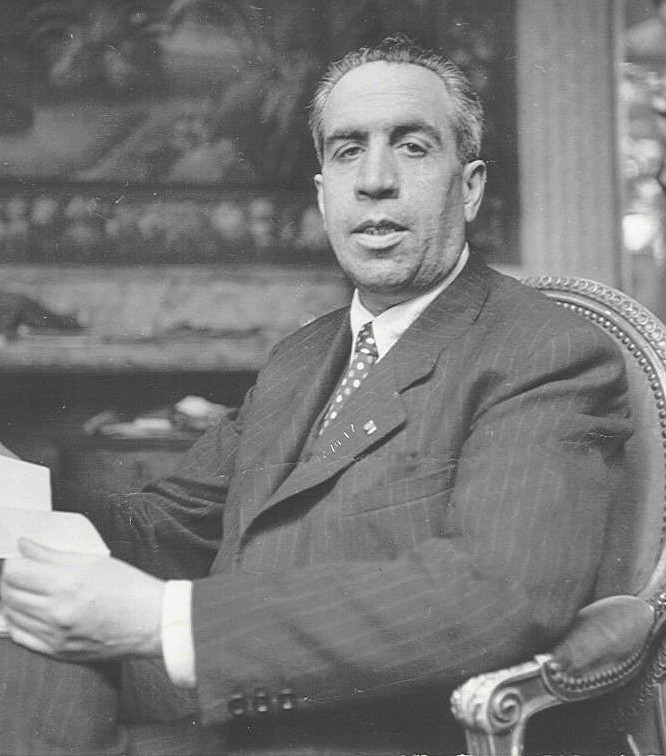
Rafael Sánchez-Guerra one of the founders of the National Republican Committee that participated in the creation of ANFD.

The conversations between socialists and anarchists were joined by politicians from the Republican Left, the Republican Union and the Federal Republican Party, integrated into the so-called National Republican Committee founded and headed by Rafael Sánchez-Guerra and Régulo Martínez. An agreement between the three parties was reached in June 1944, although it was not made public until October. In the founding manifesto, the "accidentalism" of the anarchists regarding the form of government —and the open rejection of the Republic that had persecuted them harshly— was resolved by resorting to the expression "republican order" to refer to the Second Republic.

The objective of the ANFD was the formation of a provisional government that would restore democratic freedoms and call general elections. To attract the support of the allies, a commitment was established that under the new government Spain would join the Atlantic Charter. However, a secret agreement was reached between the three signatory forces, which considered that the 1931 Constitution would be replaced and that, after the overthrow of the Franco dictatorship, there would open a process to define the new constitution.

To direct the ANFD, a national council was created, chaired by the Republican Régulo Martínez, who had been released from prison a few months earlier, and which also included the socialist Juan Gómez Egido and the anarchist Sigfrido Catalá.

The ANFD did not include the entire anti-Francoist opposition since the communists were left out (contacts maintained with the PCE did not bear fruit) as well as the Catalan, Basque and Galician nationalists. This fact, added to the fact that it lacked the open support of a foreign power lead to some not considering ANFD "strong enough to bring about a change in the internal situation of the country".

=== Negotiations with monarchists ===
The victories of the Allies in World War II were changing the international position of the Franco regime, which is why certain monarchist sectors that had supported Franco's regime until then, began contacts with representatives of the ANFD. Conversations between ANFD members and monarchists during the last months of 1944 considered more the type of regime that would replace the Francoist than how to bring the existing regime down since both parties were convinced that it would not survive the imminent allied victory in the war.

=== Arrests ===
A wave of arrests was carried out by the Francoist police at the end of 1944 and beginning of 1945. On the night of December 21–22, thanks to the denunciation of a confidant of the police, the president of the ANFD Régulo Martínez and other members of the executive committee of the ANFD and the Republican National Committee were arrested, as well as prominent monarchists who had maintained contacts with them, such as Gregorio Marañón, Cándido Casanueva y Gorjón and the political adviser of General Aranda. In March 1945, Sigfrido Catalá, an anarchist representative on the ANFD board, and other members of the national committee of the Libertarian Movement were arrested. Almost at the same time, the entire PSOE executive from the interior fell, including Juan Gómez Ejido, president and socialist representative on the ANFD board, and Sócrates Gómez, general secretary, as well as a significant number of militants.

The detained monarchists and those from the ANFD organizations did not receive the same treatment. Thus, when the court martial against the ANFD leaders was held on January 9, 1947, the monarchists who had participated in the talks were not even called to testify, and when the defense proposed General Aranda as a witness, he did not attend because precisely the day before he had been exiled to the Balearic Islands. Another general called by the defense was ordered to plead health reasons for not appearing. The defendants were sentenced to prison terms, between four and twelve years, whereas Sigfrido Catalá in a previous trial for his membership in the CNT had been sentenced to death.

In May 1945 the institution was also established in Catalonia, with the participation of a large part of nationalist organizations and the Workers' Party of Marxist Unification (POUM), which would catalyze the organization in December of the National Council of Catalan Democracy. However, once the first few years had passed since World War II, the hope that the Allies would help bring down the Franco dictatorship faded.
