= Trifón Gómez =

Spanish politician (1899–1955)

President of the Spanish Socialist Workers' Party
- In office April 1951 – 1955
- Preceded by: Indalecio Prieto

Personal details
- Born: Trifón Gómez San José; 3 July 1889 Zaratán, Spain
- Died: 8 May 1955 (aged 65) Mexico City, Mexico

Trifón Gómez (1889–1955) was a Spanish socialist politician who served at the Parliament and was one of the leaders of the Socialist Workers' Party (PSOE).

== Early life and education ==
Gómez was born in Zaratán near Valladolid on 3 July 1889. He studied at the Escuela de Huérfanos Ferroviarios in Valladolid, and began working as an apprentice turner at the age of 15 in the railway workshops in Pisuerga. At the same time, he attended the School of Arts and Crafts and graduated as a mechanical expert.

== Career and activities ==
In 1909 Gómez joined the General Union of Workers (UGT) and the Socialist Association in Valladolid. From 1915 he worked as the secretary of the Northern Railway Union which organized a general strike of August 1917. Then he was forced to go into exile in Paris where he stayed until September 1918. Following his return to Spain he settled in Madrid and joined the Madrid Socialist Association. He was also a member of the Institute of Social Reforms and during the rule of Miguel Primo de Rivera was a substitute socialist representative in its joint committees.

He became a member of the PSOE and was part of the right-wing faction. In the elections of April 1931 he was elected councilor of the Madrid City Council and was appointed deputy mayor of the district of La Inclusa. In the general elections in 1931 and 1933, he was elected as a deputy representing Madrid. When the civil war broke out, he was in charge of the department of supplies of the Madrid City Council and in 1937 he was appointed its general director.

== Exile and death ==
At the end of the civil war Gómez went into exile in France. There he reorganized the thousands of UGT members who also left Spain. The first congress of the UGT of Spain in exile was held in November 1944, and he was elected president of the UGT which he held until 1955. Gómez was elected as PSOE president in the congress held between 31 March and 1 April 1951. He replaced Indalecio Prieto in the post.

Gómez died in Mexico City on 8 May 1955.
