= Indalecio Prieto =

Spanish politician

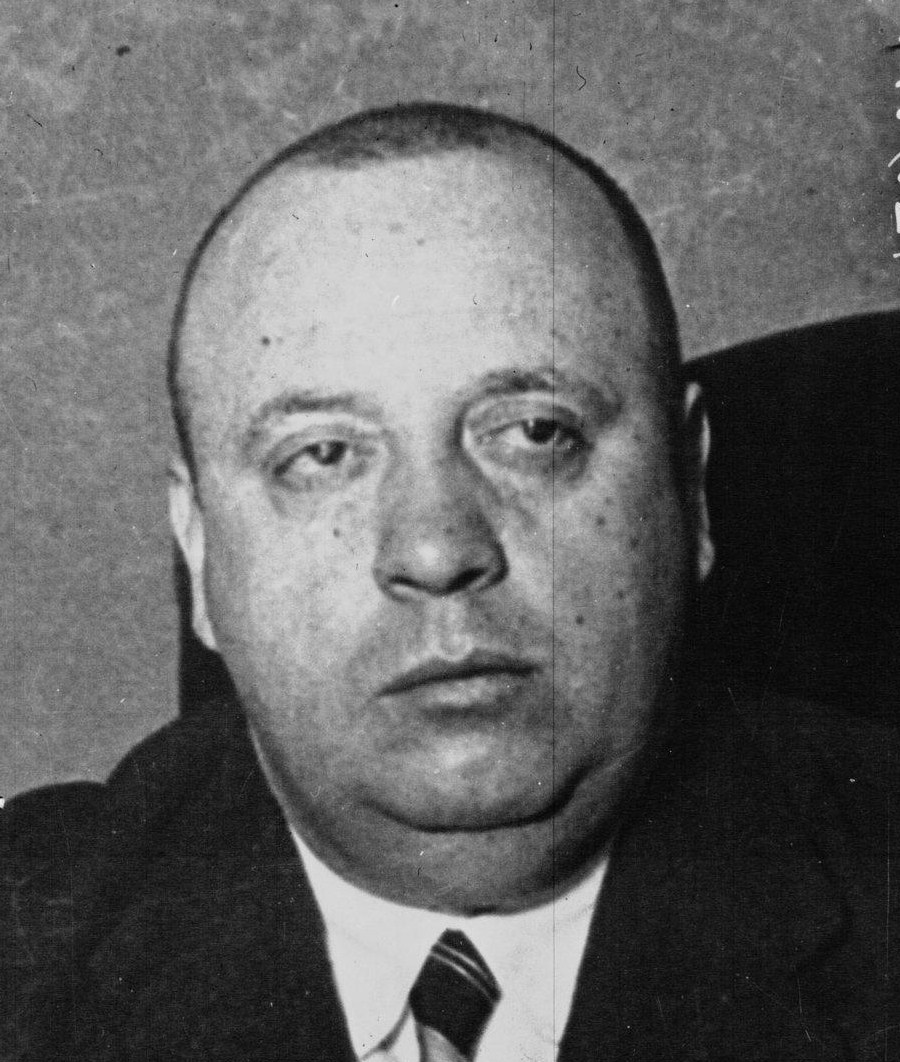
- Prieto in 1936

Minister of Finance
- In office 14 April 1931 – 16 December 1931
- President: Manuel Azaña
- Preceded by: Gabino Bugallal Araújo
- Succeeded by: Jaime Carner

Minister of Public Works
- In office 16 December 1931 – 12 September 1933
- President: Manuel Azaña

Minister of the Navy and Air Force
- In office 4 September 1936 – 17 May 1937
- President: Francisco Largo Caballero

Minister of the National Defence
- In office 17 May 1937 – 5 April 1938
- President: Juan Negrín

President of the Spanish Socialist Workers' Party
- In office 1948–1951
- Preceded by: Enrique de Francisco
- Succeeded by: Trifón Gómez

Personal details
- Born: 30 April 1883 Oviedo, Spain
- Died: 11 February 1962 (aged 78) Mexico City, Mexico
- Party: PSOE

Indalecio Prieto Tuero (30 April 1883 – 11 February 1962) was a Spanish politician, a minister and one of the leading figures of the Spanish Socialist Workers' Party (PSOE) in the years before and during the Second Spanish Republic. Less radical than Francisco Largo Caballero, Prieto served as minister under his government during the Spanish Civil War. Exiled in Mexico after the republican defeat, he led the Socialist Party from 1948 to 1951.

== Early life ==
Born in Oviedo in 1883, he was six years old when his father died. His mother moved him to Bilbao in 1891. From a young age, he survived by selling magazines in the street. He eventually obtained work as a stenographer at the daily newspaper La Voz de Vizcaya, which led to a position as a copy editor and later a journalist at the rival daily El Liberal. He eventually became the director and owner of the newspaper.

In 1899, at the age of 16, he had joined the PSOE. As a journalist in the first decade of the 20th century, Prieto became a leading figure of socialism in the Basque Country.

== Entering politics ==
Spain's neutrality in World War I greatly benefited Spanish industry and commerce, but those benefits were not reflected in the workers' salaries. The period was one of great social unrest, culminating on August 13, 1917, in a revolutionary general strike. The government's fear of unrest like that of the February Revolution that year in Russia (the October Revolution there was still to come) caused it to use the military to put down the general strike. Members of the strike committee were arrested in Madrid. Having been involved in organizing the strike, Prieto fled to France before he could be arrested.

He did not return until April 1918, when he had been elected to the Spanish Congress of Deputies. Very critical of the actions of the government and army during the Rif War, or "War of Melilla" (1919–1926), Prieto spoke out strongly in the Congress after the Battle of Annual (1921). He also addressed the likely responsibility of the king in the imprudent military actions of General Manuel Fernández Silvestre in the Melilla command zone.

Prieto was opposed to Francisco Largo Caballero's line of partial collaboration with the dictatorship of Miguel Primo de Rivera. He had bitter confrontations with both men.

In August 1930, despite the opposition of party leader Julián Besteiro Fernández, Prieto participated in the Pact of San Sebastián. The broad coalition of republican parties proposed doing away with the Spanish monarchy. In that matter, Prieto was supported by Largo Caballero's wing of the party, as the latter believed that the fall of the monarchy was necessary so that socialism could rise to power.

== Second Spanish Republic ==
When the Second Spanish Republic was proclaimed on April 14, 1931, Prieto was named finance minister in the provisional government, presided by Niceto Alcalá-Zamora.

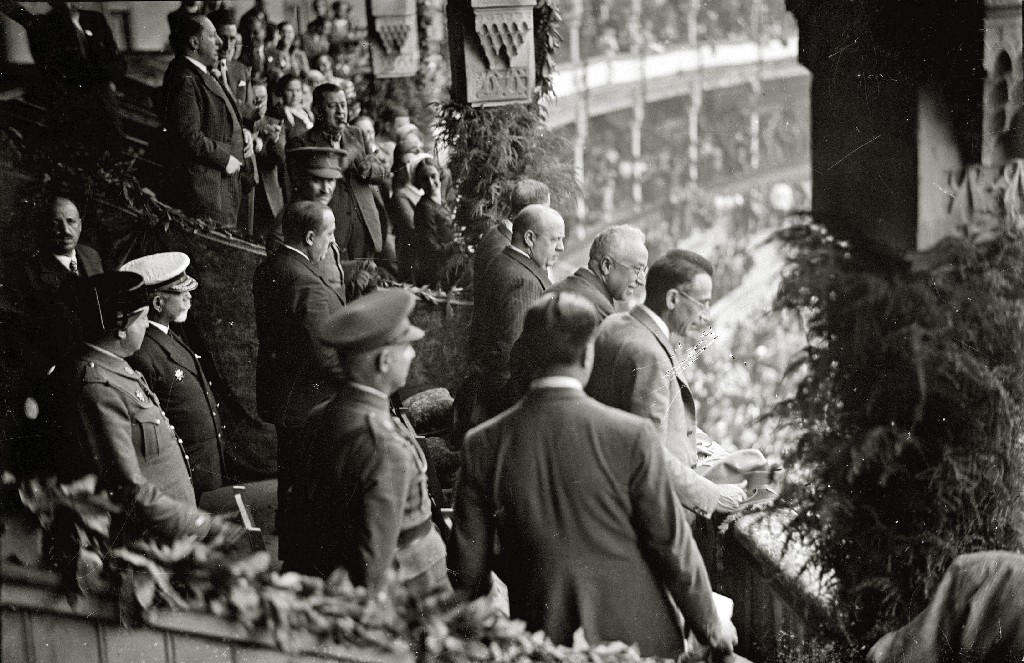
Prieto along Niceto Alcalá-Zamora and other personalities in the San Sebastián bullring (1932).

As Minister of Public Works in the 1931–1933 government of Manuel Azaña, he continued and expanded the policy of hydroelectric projects that had been begun during the Primo de Rivera dictatorship, as well as the ambitious plan of infrastructural improvements in Madrid, such as the new Chamartín railway station and the tunnel under Madrid linking it to Atocha railway station. Most of those works that would not be completed until after the 1936–1939 Spanish Civil War.

Before the republic, Prieto had arguably maintained a more radical line than Largo Caballero, but his views became more moderate as tensions worsened in the country. Historian Hugh Thomas argued that, unlike Largo Caballero, Prieto opposed the general strike and the failed revolution in October 1934. However, fellow socialist and Minister of State Julio Álvarez del Vayo claims in his book The Last Optimist that Prieto did not express opposition to the uprising. Prieto declared before the Spanish parliament that if the right-wing gained control of the government, the Socialist Party would start a revolution. Prieto then purchased weapons from the Spanish government that were confiscated in 1931 as they were on their way to Portuguese separatists. The Spanish government had been tricked into thinking that the weapons were going to Haile Selassie in Ethiopia. These weapons were to be distributed in Asturias, Andalusia, and the Basque Country. However, after members of the Socialist Youth of Spain accused Prieto of possibly sabotaging the shipment because he was viewed as a reformist unlike Caballero who was their hero at the time, Prieto reportedly said "Those children are going to learn who I am," and tried to dump all the weapons at once in Asturias. Prieto drove off after being seen unloading the weapons and tried to hide in the middle of the funeral of Manuel Andres. He then fled to France and remained there until late 1935.

Prieto gave a thrilling campaign speech in Cuenca on 1 May 1936, prior to the 3 May repetition of the February 1936 election in the district in which the Popular Front would face among the right-wing rival José Antonio Primo de Rivera and, after the resignation of General Francisco Franco as candidate, Manuel Casanova. He brought Regenerationist memories and proposed Keynesian measures to develop the domestic market of the country. In words directed towards the firebrand faction of Largo Cabrello, Prieto asked for moderation, discipline and the disregarding of revolutionary excesses that would put the democratic government in peril. The speech in which Prieto also displayed a deep sense of patriotism (he claimed to "carry Spain within his heart" and "in the marrow of his bones") was celebrated by the republican press, and it was received well even by José Antonio, then in prison. However, it was met with hostility among the radicals, deepening the rupture within the party.

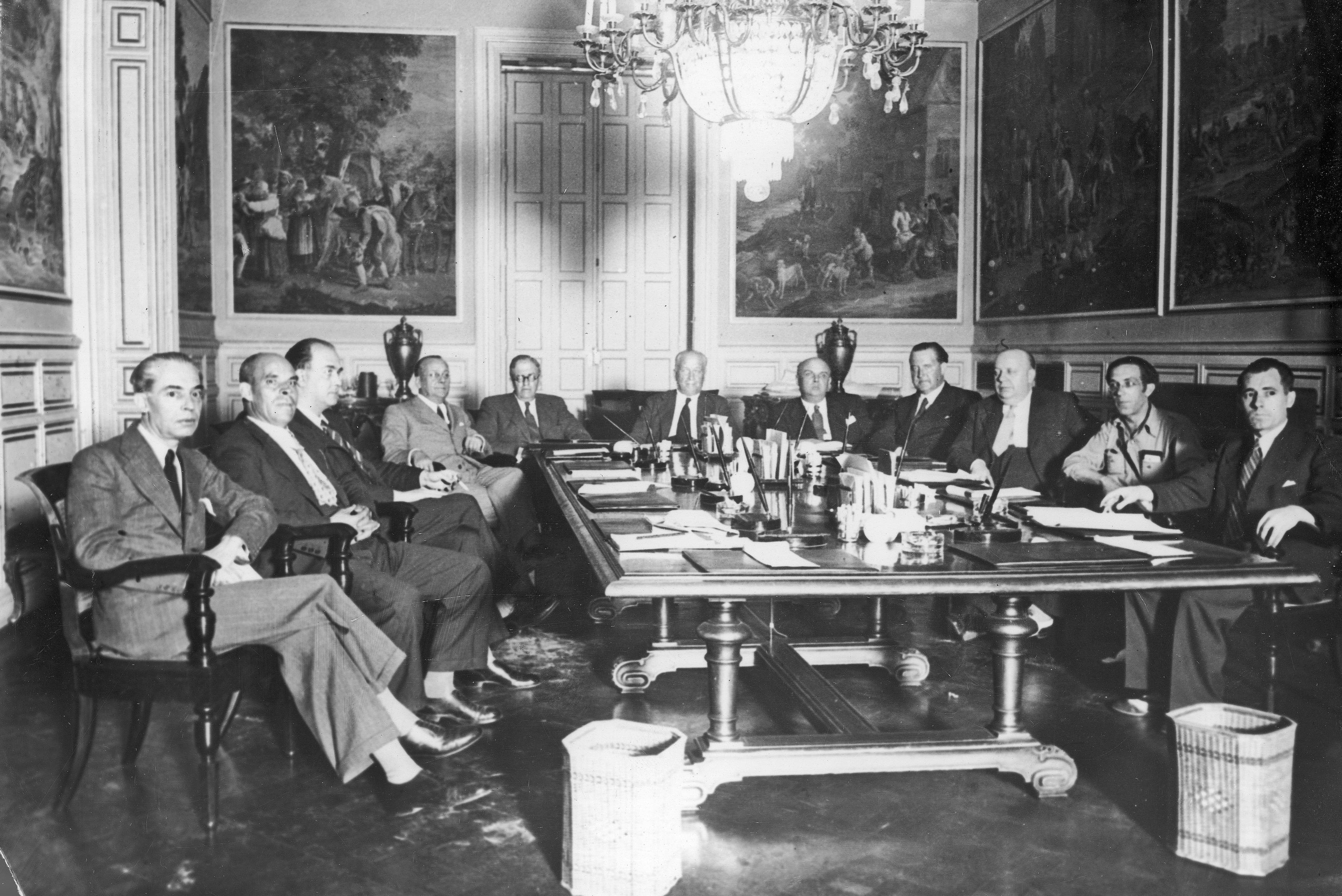
Prieto (third on the right), during a meeting of the Council of Ministers, presided by Largo Caballero (1936).

== Assassination attempt ==
In 1934, Jesús Hernández Tomás tried to kill Prieto but was unsuccessful.

On 31 May 1936, Prieto was shot at a socialist rally in Ecija.

== Spanish Civil War ==
After the beginning of the Civil War, when news of the ruthless and systematic executions of Loyalists by the Nationalists, as part of General Mola's policy of instilling terror in their ranks, began to filter to the areas held by the government, Prieto made a fervent plea to Spanish republicans on 8 August in a radiocast:

Don't imitate them! Don't imitate them! Surpass them in moral conduct; surpass them by being generous. I do not ask you, however, that you should lose either strength in battle or zeal in the fight. I ask for brave, hard and steely breasts for the combat,... but with sensitive hearts, capable of shaking when faced with human sorrow and being able to harbour mercy and tender feelings, without which the most essential part of human greatness is lost.

However, a couple of weeks after those words, the Modelo Massacre took place in Madrid, much to the dismay of many Popular Front leaders. Saddened, Prieto is recorded as expressing his pessimism with these words: "with this brutality we have lost the war". However, historian Julius Ruiz argues that Prieto was not necessarily a steadfast moderate, as he held that Republican victory would require stripping the Church, capitalists and army of their power as they were deemed collectively responsible for the rebellion. In August 1936, Prieto also stated that Republican terror was unnecessary because their internal opponents were already cowed and that Nationalist terror was because of their relative weakness.

In September 1936, after the fall of Talavera de la Reina, in Toledo Province, to the rebels, Largo Caballero became the head of the government, and Prieto became Minister of Marine and Air.

After the May 3–8, 1937 events in Barcelona in which the communists and the government forces tried to establish control over the Workers' Party of Marxist Unification (POUM) and the anarchist Confederación Nacional del Trabajo (CNT), the government of Largo Caballero fell and was replaced by that of Juan Negrín, with Prieto being Minister of War. Lacking support from the democratic powers, such as France, the United Kingdom and the United States, the Spanish Republic was subject to severe international isolation during Prieto's last ministry in Spain. Maritime access for Soviet material aid was effectively cut off by the attacks of Italian submarines, and the French border remained closed.

After the defeat of the Spanish Republican Armed Forces on the northern front in October 1937, he offered his resignation, which was rejected. Prieto finally left the government after the March 1938 defeat on the Aragon front after an escalating dispute with the communists.

== Exile ==
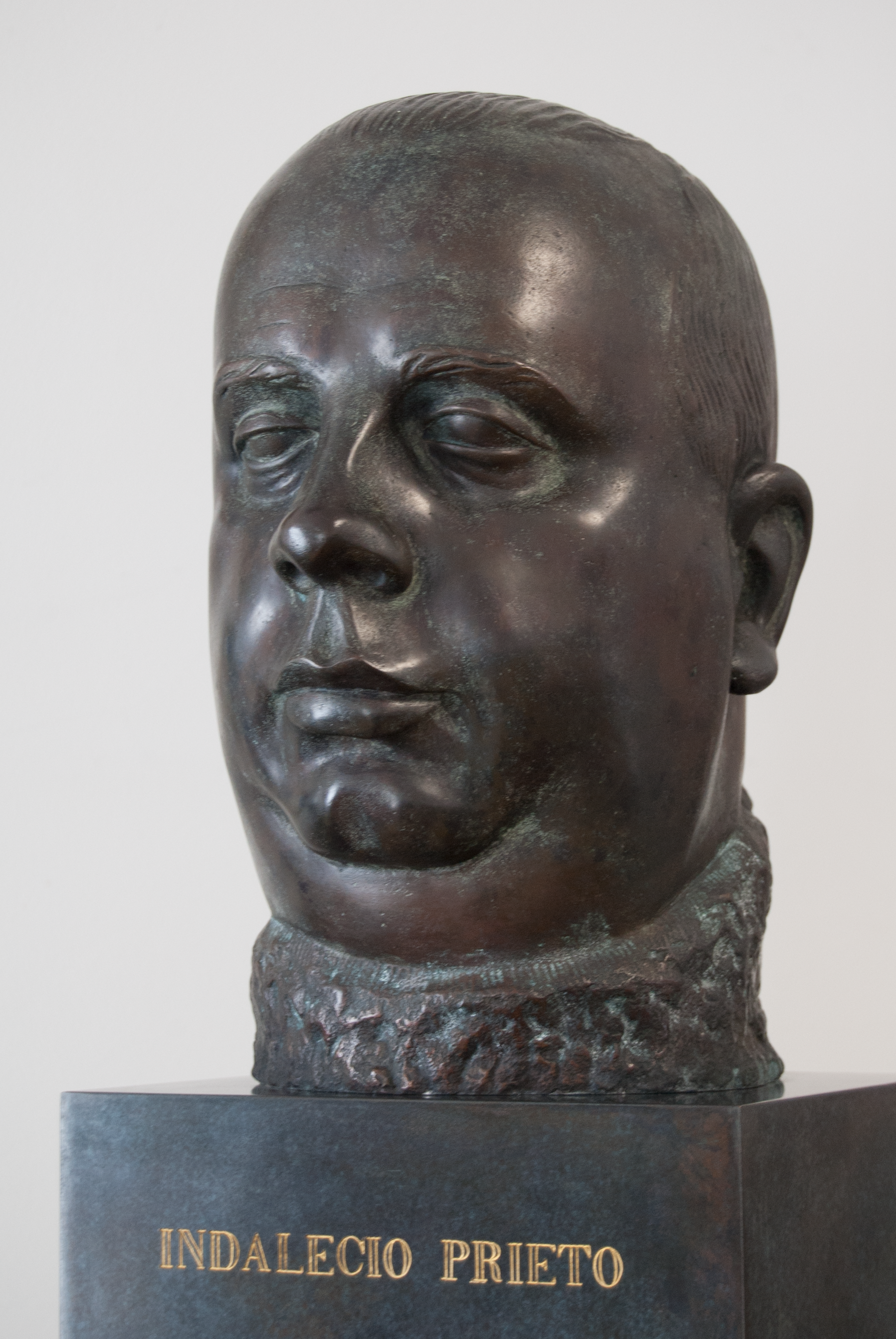
Indalecio Prieto (Juan Cristóbal, 1926).

He refrained from active political life for the remainder of the war, exiling himself to Mexico. In 1945, toward the end of World War II, he was one of those who attempted to form a republican government-in-exile and hoped to reach an accord with the monarchist opposition to Francisco Franco, the ruler of Spain since the end of the Civil War, with a view to restoring Spanish democracy. The failure of that initiative led to his definitive retirement from active politics. He died in Mexico City in 1962.

In Mexico, he wrote several books, such as Palabras al viento (Words in the Wind, 1942), Discursos en América (Discourses in America, 1944) and at the end of his life, Cartas a un escultor: pequeños detalles de grandes sucesos (Letters to a Sculptor: Small Details of Great events, 1962).

== Positions ==
Supporting of the notion of further devolution to the Basque Provinces and Navarra, Prieto was greatly opposed to separatism as well as towards the plans of the Basque nationalists in the draft of the Estella Statute, fearing the prospect of the territory becoming a "reactionary Gibraltar and a clerical stronghold".

== See also ==
- Spanish Republican Army

== Bibliography ==
- Beevor, Antony. The battle for Spain. The Spanish Civil War 1936–1939. Penguin Books. London. 2006. ISBN 0-14-303765-X
- Cabezas, Octavio (2005). Indalecio Prieto, socialista y español. Algaba Ediciones. ISBN 84-96107-45-0.
- Graham, Helen. The Spanish Civil War. A very short introduction. Oxford University Press. New York. 2005. ISBN 978-0-19-280377-1
- Granja Sainz, José Luis de la (2008). Nacionalismo y II República en el País Vasco: Estatutos de autonomía, partidos y elecciones. Historia de Acción Nacionalista Vasca, 1930–1936. Madrid: Siglo XXI. ISBN 978-84-323-1309-7.
- Jackson, Gabriel. The Spanish Republic and the Civil War, 1931–1939. Princeton University Press. 1967. Princeton. ISBN 0-691-00757-8
- López Villaverde, Ángel Luis (1999). "Indalecio Prieto en Cuenca: Comentarios al discurso pronunciado el 1º de mayo de 1936" (PDF). Añil (19). ISSN 1133-2263.
- Redondo, Gonzalo (1993). Historia de la Iglesia en España, 1931–1939: La Guerra Civil, 1936–1939. Madrid: Rialp. ISBN 84-321-3016-8.
- Thomas, Hugh. The Spanish Civil War. Penguin Books. London. 2001. ISBN 978-0-14-101161-5

Political offices
Preceded by Gabino Bugallal Araújo	Minister of Finance; 1931	Succeeded by Jaime Carner Romeu
Preceded by Diego Martínez Barrio	Minister of Public Works; 1931–1933	Succeeded by Rafael Guerra del Río
Preceded by Francisco Matz Sánchez	Minister of the Navy and Air Force; 1936–1937	Succeeded by Himself as Minister of National Defense
Preceded by Himself as Minister of the Navy and Air Force	Minister of National Defence; 1937–1938	Succeeded by Juan Negrín
Party political offices
Preceded by Enrique de Francisco	President of the Spanish Socialist Workers' Party; 1948–1951	Succeeded by Trifón Gómez
