= Rafael Sánchez-Guerra =

Spanish lawyer, journalist and politician (1897–1964)

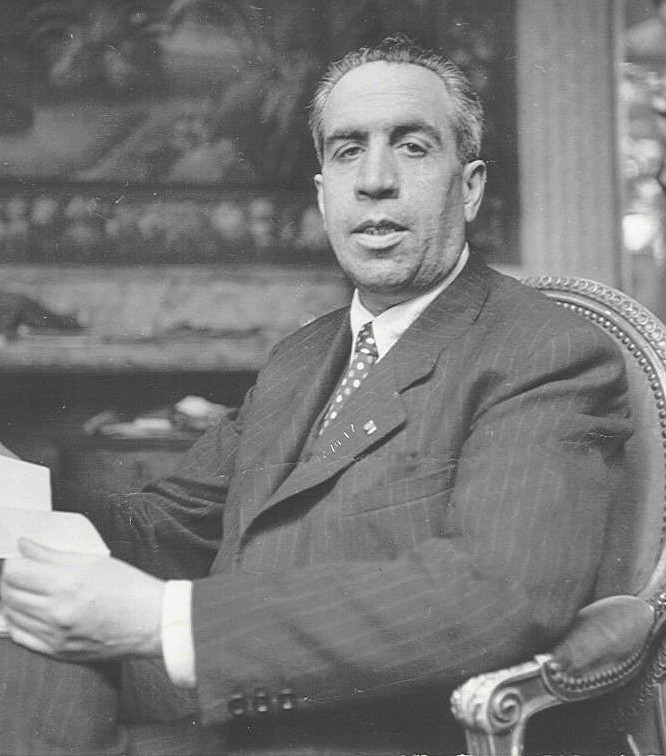
- Sánchez Guerra in 1950

Minister without portfolio
- In office 1946–1947
- Prime Minister: José Giral

8th president of Real Madrid
- In office 31 May 1935 – 4 August 1936
- Preceded by: Luis Usera Bugallal
- Succeeded by: Adolfo Meléndez

Member of the City Council of Madrid
- In office 14 April 1931 – 28 March 1939

Personal details
- Born: 28 October 1897 Madrid, Spain
- Died: 2 April 1964 (aged 66) Villava, Spain
- Occupation: Lawyer, journalist, politician

Rafael Sánchez-Guerra Sainz (28 October 1897 – 2 April 1964) was a Spanish lawyer, journalist and politician who was the 8th president of Real Madrid from 31 May 1935 until 4 August 1936.

His presidency at Real Madrid coincided with the Spanish Civil War and Sánchez-Guerra, a prominent Republican, refused to flee Madrid as it was about to fall into the hands of Francisco Franco. He was captured, imprisoned by supporters of Franco before escaping to Paris where he became a prominent member of the government-in-exile. During the war itself, Sánchez-Guerra had little active involvement in the daily management of Real Madrid, acting with non-official presidents Juan José Vallejo and Antonio Ortega (these two presidents were not elected), running things on his behalf.

He served as Minister without portfolio from 1946 until 1947 in the government-in-exile under prime minister José Giral. From 14 April 1931 until 28 March 1939, Sánchez-Guerra was a member of the City Council of Madrid.

== Honours ==
- Copa del Presidente de la República: 1936
