= Francisco Jordán =

Andalusian anarcho-syndicalist (1886–1921)

General Secretary of the Confederación Nacional del Trabajo
- In office 24 August 1916 – 5 February 1917
- Preceded by: Manuel Andreu
- Succeeded by: Francisco Miranda

Personal details
- Born: 13 September 1886 Valdepeñas, Ciudad Real, Spain
- Died: 30 June 1921 (aged 34) Barcelona, Catalonia, Spain
- Manner of death: Assassination
- Occupation: Carpenter, trade unionist
- Organisation: National Confederation of Labour
- Movement: Anarchism in Spain

Francisco Jordán (13 September 1886 – 30 June 1921) was an Andalusian anarcho-syndicalist. A carpenter by trade, Jordán moved to Barcelona and joined the National Confederation of Labour (CNT). As the organisation's general secretary, he organised a general strike in 1916, in collaboration with the General Workers' Union (UGT). After he was arrested and imprisoned, he resigned as general secretary and went into writing. He was assassinated by pistoleros.

== Biography ==
=== Early life and activism ===
Francisco Jordán was born into an Andalusian family in Valdepeñas, in 1886. He became a carpenter and settled in Pinos Puente, where he joined a workers' circle and organised a Ferrer school. By 1911, he had moved from Andalusia to Barcelona, where he became an anarcho-syndicalist and joined the National Confederation of Labour (CNT), a national trade union centre.

Between 1911 and 1914, the CNT was driven underground and the position of general secretary rotated between Jordan, Josep Negre and Francisco Miranda. During this period, Jordán himself was found guilty of possession of explosives and sentenced to four years imprisonment. From prison, he wrote about civil disobedience and called for people to stop attending mass, for which he was put in solitary confinement. After his release from prison, he briefly returned to Andalusia and worked as a teacher at a secular school in Castro del Río, before moving back to Barcelona. During World War I, Jordán vocally advocated for antimilitarism and proletarian internationalism, declaring that European states and business owners were using patriotism to divide the working class.

=== General Secretary of the CNT ===
On 24 August 1916, Jordán was elected as general secretary of the CNT's national committee, taking over from Manuel Andreu. He took this position shortly after the CNT had sealed a pact with the socialist-aligned General Workers' Union (UGT), uniting the Spanish labour movement for the first time. Jordán himself spoke at joint UGT-CNT rallies in Madrid, where he called for a reduction in the cost of living.

The two organisations differed on strategy, with the CNT seeing the pact as a prelude to revolution, while the UGT opted for a gradualist programme. The UGT proposed a mere one-day work stoppage, in contrast to Jordán, who called for an indefinite general strike. By the autumn of 1916, the UGT found themselves attempting to restrain Jordán's revolutionary plans. Divisions came to a head at a joint meeting on 19 November 1916, when the socialists rejected Jordán's proposal for an indefinite general strike. Jordán complained that the socialists were spending too much time meeting with government ministers.

The UGT and CNT instead went ahead with the proposal for a one-day general strike, which took place on 18 December 1916, and which Jordán helped organise. That day, Jordán attempted to escalate the class conflict by spreading fake news about a massacre of workers in Barcelona. The general strike reinvigorated hopes that a revolution could take place in Spain, with Solidaridad Obrera affirming that the strike itself could have escalated into a revolution.

On 28 January 1917, Jordán was arbitrarily arrested and detained by Catalan police after leaving a rally at a social centre. His arrest was condemned by Solidaridad Obrera and El Socialista, the latter of which called for the Civil Governor of Barcelona to "clean up" the police force. From his prison cell, he resigned his post as general secretary on 5 February 1917. Francisco Miranda, who took over as general secretary the following month, reaffirmed his commitment to the CNT-UGT pact as a step towards social revolution.

=== Later life ===
After his release from prison in March 1917, Jordán returned to writing, penning theatre plays and articles for the anarchist press. At this time, he was accused by the right-wing press of receiving funding from the German Empire.

Following the Russian Revolution, Jordán expressed support for the Bolsheviks and the Communist International, praising them for reviving Karl Marx's conception of the dictatorship of the proletariat, which he said had been neglected by many Marxists. He initially believed that the Bolsheviks' establishment of an authoritarian regime was inevitable, due to the perceived backwardness of the Russian people. However, he later came to reject the Bolshevik dictatorship, saying it went against all the principles of libertarianism, liberalism and anarchism.

In the summer of 1921, Jordán was assassinated by pistoleros.

== Selected works ==
- La dictadura del proletariado (Mexico, 1922)

== Bibliography ==
- Christie, Stuart (2008) [2000]. We, the Anarchists! A Study of the Iberian Anarchist Federation (FAI) 1927-1937. AK Press. ISBN 9781904859758.
- Gómez Casas, Juan [in Spanish] (1986). Anarchist Organisation: the History of the F.A.I. Translated by Bluestein, Abe. Black Rose Books. ISBN 0-920057-40-3.
- Montagut, Eduardo (4 January 2018). "Los socialistas y la detención del anarcosindicalista Francisco Jordán" [The socialists and the detention of the anarcho-syndicalist Francisco Jordán] (in Spanish).
- Peirats, Josep (2011) [2001]. Ealham, Chris (ed.). The CNT in the Spanish Revolution. Vol. 1. Translated by Sharkey, Paul; Ealham, Chris. PM Press. ISBN 978-1-60486-207-2.
- Romero Salvadó, Francisco J. (2010). "Spain's Revolutionary Crisis of 1917: A Reckless Gamble". In Romero Salvadó, Francisco J.; Smith, Angel (eds.). The Agony of Spanish Liberalism. Palgrave Macmillan. pp. 62–91. doi:10.1057/9780230274648_3. ISBN 978-1-349-36383-4.
- Romero Salvadó, Francisco J. (2017). "Between the Catalan Quagmire and the Red Spectre, Spain, November 1918 – April 1919". The Historical Journal. 60 (3): 795–815. doi:10.1017/S0018246X16000480.
- Smith, Angel (2007). "Between Reform and Revolution: The Catalan CNT and the Left-Wing Challenge to the Restoration Regime, 1915 to 1918". Anarchism, Revolution and Reaction: Catalan Labour and the Crisis of the Spanish State, 1898–1923. Berghahn Books. pp. 259–289. ISBN 978-1-84545-176-9.
- Zoffmann Rodriguez, Arturo (2017). "Lenin in Barcelona: the Russian Revolution and the Spanish trienio bolchevista, 1917–1920". Slavic Review. 76 (3): 629–636. doi:10.1017/slr.2017.170.
- Zoffmann Rodriguez, Arturo (2018). "An Uncanny Honeymoon: Spanish Anarchism and the Bolshevik Dictatorship of the Proletariat, 1917–22". International Labor and Working-Class History. 94: 5–26. doi:10.1017/S0147547918000066.
- Zoffmann Rodriguez, Arturo (2019). The Spanish anarchists and the Russian Revolution, 1917-24 (PhD). European University Institute. doi:10.2870/749506.

Preceded by Manuel Andreu	General Secretary of the Confederación Nacional del Trabajo 1916–1917	Succeeded by Francisco Miranda
