= Pau Sabater =

Catalan trade unionist (1884–1919)

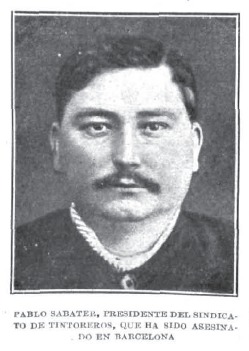
- Born: Pau Sabater Lliró; 5 March 1884; Algerri, Lleida, Spain
- Died: 19 July 1919 (aged 35); Barcelona, Catalonia Spain
- Cause of death: Execution by shooting
- Organization: National Confederation of Labour
- Movement: Labour movement in Spain

Pau Sabater Lliró (Note: Also known by the Spanish: Pablo Sabater Lliró.) (1884–1919), also known by his nickname El Tero, was a Catalan trade unionist. A leader among dye workers of the National Confederation of Labour (CNT), Sabater led a strike action at the dyeing factory La Canadenca. He was murdered by mercenaries in 1919, marking the beginning of pistolerismo in Catalonia.

== Biography ==
Pau Sabater Lliró was born in Algerri, in the province of Lleida, in 1884. He moved to the Catalan capital of Barcelona, where he went to work in the dyeing industry and joined the growing trade union movement. In 1916, he was elected as general secretary of the dyers' union of the National Confederation of Labour (CNT). He also regularly visited the social centre Serrallonga.

By 1919, the CNT had grown to count about 500,000 members and was increasingly intervening in strike actions. In an attempt to stop the rise of the CNT, the government of Spain banned the organisation and shut down its publications. In protest against this, in February 1919, Sabater led dye workers at the factory La Canadenca into a strike action. Valencian historian José Peirats described it as the "best organised strike" that had been carried out by the CNT at that time. In response to the strike, business owners mobilised gangs of merceneraies known as pistoleros to attack members of the CNT. Sabater, who was suspected of leading an "action group", was targeted for assassination. According to historian Angel Smith, the Spanish military wanted to send a message to Spanish syndicalists that they could no longer take action with impunity.

On the night of 19 July 1919, Sabater was arrested at his home by men disguised as police. He was detained ostensibly on charges of killing an industrialist named Barrett. Sabater was taken to a quiet part of town, where he was summarily shot. His body was found the following morning, riddled with bullets, on the road to Montcada. Sabater was the first trade unionist to be assassinated during the years of pistolerismo, marking the beginning of a string of murders of Catalan trade unionists. News of Sabater's murder outraged trade unionists, with thousands of workers attending his funeral. Luis Fernández, who many trade unionists suspected of being a member of the Banda Negra, a mercenary gang led by Manuel Bravo Portillo, was convicted for the murder of Sabater. Bravo Portillo himself was never put on trial for the murder. In revenge, syndicalists assassinated Bravo Portillo two months later.

== Bibliography ==
- Íñiguez, Miguel (2001). "Sabater Lliró, Pablo". Esbozo de una enciclopedia histórica del anarquismo español (in Spanish). Madrid: Fundación de Estudios Libertarios Anselmo Lorenzo. p. 540. ISBN 9788486864453. OCLC 807322760.
- Grafl, Florian (2013). "A Blueprint for Successfully Fighting Anarchist Terror? Counter-Terrorist Communities of Violence in Barcelona during the Pistolerismo". In Hanhimäki, Jussi M.; Blumenau, Bernhard (eds.). An International History of Terrorism. Routledge. pp. 51–64. doi:10.4324/9780203093467-5 (inactive 6 July 2025). ISBN 978-0-415-63540-0.
- Grafl, Florian (2016). "World War I and Its Impact on Catalonia". In Barry, Gearóid; Dal Lago, Enrico; Healy, Róisín (eds.). Small Nations and Colonial Peripheries in World War I. Brill. pp. 125–139. doi:10.1163/9789004310018_009. ISBN 978-90-04-31001-8.
- Peirats, Josep (2011) [2001]. Ealham, Chris (ed.). The CNT in the Spanish Revolution. Vol. 1. Translated by Sharkey, Paul; Ealham, Chris. PM Press. ISBN 978-1-60486-207-2.
- Smith, Angel (2007). Anarchism, Revolution, and Reaction: Catalan Labour and the Crisis of the Spanish State: 1898-1923. Berghahn Books. ISBN 978-1-84545-176-9.
