= Manuel Andreu =

Catalan politician and trade unionist (1889–1968)

Member of Barcelona City Council
- In office 1936–1939

General Secretary of the Confederación Nacional del Trabajo
- In office November 1915 – 24 August 1916
- Preceded by: Josep Negre
- Succeeded by: Francisco Jordán

Personal details
- Born: 1 January 1889 Barcelona, Catalonia, Spain
- Died: 10 October 1968 (aged 79) Barcelona, Catalonia, Spain
- Party: Acció Catalana Republicana
- Other political affiliations: Confederación Nacional del Trabajo

Manuel Andreu Colomer (1889–1968) was a Catalan politician and trade unionist. As leader of the Barcelona electricians' union, he was a founding member of the Confederación Nacional del Trabajo (CNT). In 1915, he became editor of the CNT's newspaper Solidaridad Obrera and as was elected as the organisation's General Secretary. He was involved in a series of controversies during this time, due to his rejection of anarcho-syndicalism and recognition of minority nationalities in Spain, over which he was forced to resign his posts. He continued to participate in the restructuring of the CNT, successfully pushing for it to be organised along the lines of industrial unionism. By the time of the Second Spanish Republic, he had left the syndicalist movement and become a Catalan nationalist, serving in the Barcelona City Council as a member of Acció Catalana Republicana.

== Biography ==
Born into a Catalan family and an electrician by trade, Manuel Andreu became a prominent syndicalist militant as the leader of an electricians' trade union. He played a leading role in the foundation and early years of the Confederación Nacional del Trabajo (CNT), when the union was organising clandestinely. Representing the electricians' union, in 1912, he co-founded the Barcelona Workers' Center together with Andreu Cuadros, Josep Mas i Gomeri, Josep Negre and Salvador Seguí, among others. In 1914, he was arrested during a strike action at a factory in Barcelona.

In January 1913, the government of Álvaro de Figueroa granted an amnesty for trade union organisers and the CNT began to return to public activity. But as only the Catalan branch of the union was organised, in April 1915, Ángel Pestaña proposed the reorganisation of the CNT. At this time, Andreu himself began to take a more leading role in the organisation. Considered by his peers to be a gifted speaker, he gave more than 10 lectures per week and was soon elected as the general secretary of the CNT's Catalan branch. From May 1915, he was editor-in-chief of the newspaper Solidaridad Obrera. Andreu represented the paper at an International Peace Congress in Ferrol, where he met with dozens of other delegates, alongside fellow Catalan CNT members Ángel Pestaña, Eusebi Carbó and Francisco Miranda Concha. Following the CNT's own Ferrol congress, in November 1915, he was elected as the General Secretary of the CNT. In this role, Andreu oversaw the progressive reorganisation of the CNT's regional committees throughout the country.

In 1916, he became embroiled in a bitter polemical exchange with Mas i Gomeri, after Andreu had described anarchism as "literary lyricism" at a syndicalist conference in Barcelona. Andreu advocated for a "pure syndicalism", in contrast to anarcho-syndicalism. That same year he was caught up in another controversy, after he publicly defended the recognition of minority nationalities in Spain. He became a focus of criticism by the anarchist newspaper Tierra y Libertad and, in August 1916, he was forced to resign from his positions.

Despite the controversy, he continued to contribute articles to Solidaridad Obrera, proclaiming his opposition to the possibility of Spanish intervention in World War I and publishing his thoughts on the upcoming 1918 congress of the CNT. Andreu called for the CNT to be reorganised and given a more clearly defined structure, proposing: that only a single union be recognised for each trade in a given locality; that similar trades be grouped together into single unions of different sections; and that local federations of these single unions be constituted. When the congress of the CNT's Catalan regional federation was convened in Sants in June 1918, Andreu's proposal for "single unions" was supported by Josep Negre and Salvador Seguí. The congress resolved to replace the old trade federations with single industrial unions, in a process that was overseen and implemented by Seguí.

Over time, Andreu began to move away from syndicalism and eventually left the CNT, gravitating instead towards Catalan nationalism. Following the proclamation of the Second Spanish Republic, he joined Acció Catalana Republicana (ACR). After the outbreak of the Spanish Civil War, in October 1936, he was elected as a representative of the ACR to the Barcelona City Council, where he worked in the statistics department.

== See also ==
- Anarchism in Spain

== Bibliography ==
- Casado Gil, María Reyes (2016). La Confederación Nacional del Trabajo en el Estado español: reorganización y crisis (1973–1980) (PhD) (in Spanish). National University of Distance Education.
- Gabriel Sirvent, Pere (2020). "Abans del congrés de Sants: Barcelona, entre la Rosa de Foc i la construcció de la CNT". Barcelona: Quaderns d'història (in Catalan) (26): 15–28. ISSN 1135-3058. Archived from the original on 1 November 2023.
- Íñiguez, Miguel (2001). "Andreu, Manuel". Esbozo de una enciclopedia histórica del anarquismo español (in Spanish). Madrid: Fundación de Estudios Libertarios Anselmo Lorenzo. p. 43. ISBN 9788486864453. OCLC 807322760.
- Pagès i Blanch, Pelai (2000). "Andreu Colomer, Manuel". In Martínez de Sas, María Teresa; Pagès i Blanch, Pelai (eds.). Diccionari biogràfic del moviment obrer als Països Catalans (in Catalan). Publicacions de L'Abadia de Montserrat. p. 96. ISBN 84-8415-243-X.
- d'Olwer, Lluís Nicolau; Cuito i Canals, Ferran (2003). Epistolari de l'exili francès, 1941-1946 (in Catalan). L'Abadia de Montserrat. p. 53. ISBN 978-84-8415-465-5.
- Marinello Bonnefoy, Juan Cristóbal (2016). "Sociedades de oficio y sindicatos de industria en Barcelona durante la primera Guerra Mundial". In Marín i Corbera, Martí; Domènech i Sampere, Xavier; Martínez i Muntada, Ricard (eds.). III International Conference Strikes and Social Conflicts: combined historical approaches to conflict. Proceedings (in Spanish). Autonomous University of Barcelona. pp. 1042–1051. ISBN 978-84-608-7860-5.
- Thorpe, Wayne (2006). "El Ferrol, Rio de Janeiro, Zimmerwald, and Beyond: Syndicalist Internationalism, 1914-1918". Revue belge de Philologie et d'Histoire Année. 84 (4): 1005–1023.

Preceded by Josep Negre	General Secretary of the Confederación Nacional del Trabajo 1914–1916	Succeeded by Francisco Jordán
