= Evelio Boal =

Spanish anarchist (1884–1921)

Evelio Boal López
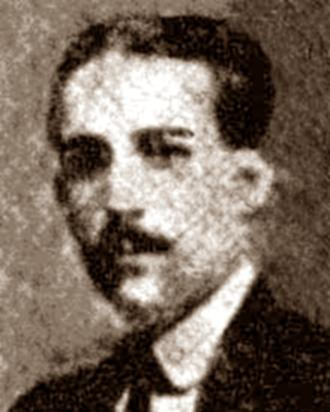
- Boal (c. 1921)

General Secretary of the Confederación Nacional del Trabajo
- In office January 1919 – March 1921
- Preceded by: Manuel Buenacasa
- Succeeded by: Andreu Nin

Personal details
- Born: Evelio Boal López; 11 May 1884 Valladolid, Old Castile, Spain
- Died: 18 June 1921 (aged 37) Barcelona, Catalonia, Spain
- Manner of death: Assassination
- Citizenship: Spanish
- Profession: Graphic designer

Evelio Boal López (Valladolid, 11 May 1884 – Barcelona, 18 June 1921) was a Spanish graphic designer, trade unionist and anarchist. He was one of the organizers of the Congress of Sants of the National Confederation of Labour, forming part of the commission that wrote the report.

== Biography ==
Evelio Boal was born in Valladolid on 11 May 1884. At a very young age he went to live in Barcelona, where he worked as a typographer. By 1908 he was already a member of the board of the Union of the Art of Printing and launched the strike against El Progreso, an organ of Alejandro Lerroux's Radical Republican Party. He later joined the National Confederation of Labor (Spanish: Confederación Nacional del Trabajo, CNT) and collaborated in the weekly Tierra y Libertad under the pseudonym Chispazos. He was also an amateur actor, with which he directed the Grupo Artístico Teatral del Centro Obrero. He took part in the organization of the 1917 general strike and was the one who drafted the minutes of the joint meetings with the General Union of Workers (Spanish: Unión General de Trabajadores, UGT).

In August 1918 he was elected a member of the CNT Committee and in February 1919 he provisionally replaced Manuel Buenacasa Tomeo as the CNT's General Secretary. In January 1919 he was arrested during the La Canadenca strike, being released shortly thereafter by popular request. In the December of that same year, he was confirmed in office at the CNT congress that was held at the Madrid Comedy Theatre. There he was one of the 24 signatories of the opinion on the ideological definition of the CNT, which declared its purpose to be the pursuit of libertarian communism. He was also delegated to meet with union leaders in Portugal. In August 1920, together with Salvador Seguí and Salvador Quemades, he traveled to Madrid to rebuild the alliance between the CNT and the UGT for future mobilizations.

He was secretary of the CNT Committee until March 1921, when he was arrested and imprisoned in the Barcelona Model Prison, where he was beaten and tortured. When he was released on the morning of 17 June 1921, he was assassinated at the prison gate, along with Antoni Feliu i Codina, then treasurer of the CNT, in application of the escape law.

Preceded by Francisco Miranda Concha	General Secretary of the CNT 1918–1921	Succeeded by Andreu Nin Pérez
