= José Negre =

Spanish trade unionist (1875-1939)

Josep Negre
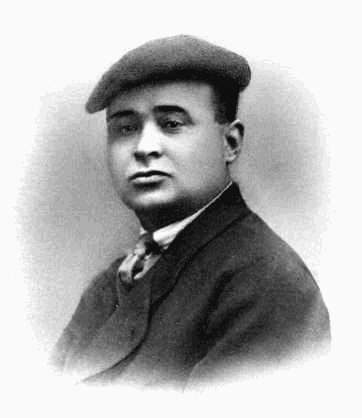
- Negre (c. 1911)

General Secretary of the Confederación Nacional del Trabajo
- In office 19 November 1910 – 1914
- Preceded by: Position established
- Succeeded by: Manuel Andreu

Personal details
- Born: Josep Negre i Oliveras; 13 May 1875 Lludient, Alt Millars, Valencia, Spain
- Died: 24 December 1939 (aged 64) Argelès-sur-Mer, Vallespir, France
- Party: Confederación Nacional del Trabajo
- Profession: Typographer

Josep Negre i Oliveras (13 May 1875 – 24 December 1939) was a Valencian anarcho-syndicalist leader.

== Biography ==
In 1875, Josep Negre i Oliveras was born in the Valencian town of Lludient. He settled in Barcelona, where he worked as a typographer and in 1907 participated in the founding of Solidaritat Obrera. In 1908, along with Tomás Herreros Miguel, he took part in the eight-month strike against the Radical Republican Party's newspaper El Progreso. He was also a member of the strike committee formed during the Tragic Week of 1909.

During the founding congress of the National Confederation of Labor (Spanish: Confederación Nacional del Trabajo, CNT), on 19 November 1910 Negre was elected as the union's first General Secretary. In 1911, he was arrested and imprisoned for participating in a strike in solidarity with the miners of Euskadi.

After his release, in 1913 he attended the First International Syndicalist Congress, held in London from 27 September to 2 October, where he made his speech in Valencian. The 1914 he was part of a clandestine commission of the Regional Confederation of Labor of Catalunya (Catalan: Confederació Regional del Treball de Catalunya, CRTC), which tried to reorganize the CNT.

In 1916 he became the editor and director of the CNT's newspaper Solidaridad Obrera, but he left active militancy in 1917 after Salvador Seguí i Rubinat, Salvador Quemades and Manuel Buenacasa Tomeo publicly accused him of being sympathetic to the Central Powers and of associating with the German embassy. However, by the time the Barcelona Traction strike began, he had already returned to the CNT's propaganda apparatus, and for that reason in 1919 he ended up imprisoned in the Pelayo, in the port of Barcelona.

During the Spanish Civil War he collaborated in propaganda campaigns of the Union of Iron and Steel Industries, and at the end of the conflict he went into exile in France. Here he was interned in the Argelès-sur-Mer concentration camp, where he died. His family was cared for by his friend, the French anarchist Maxime Mattéi.

== Works ==
- ¿Qué es el sindicalismo? (1919)
- Recuerdos de un viejo militante (1936)
- ¿Qué es el colectivismo anarquista? (1937)

== See also ==
- Anarchism in Spain

== Bibliography ==
- Íñiguez, Miguel (2008). Enciclopedia histórica del anarquismo español (in Spanish). Vitoria: Asociación Isaac Puente. ISBN 978-84-612-4219-1.
- Martínez de Sas, María Teresa (December 2000). Diccionari Biogràfic del Moviment Obrer als Països Catalans. Publicacions de l'Abadia de Montserrat (in Catalan). Edicions Universitat de Barcelona. ISBN 848415243X.

Preceded by Role established	General Secretary of the CNT 1910-1911; 1911-1914	Succeeded by Manuel Andreu Colomer
