= Francisco Miranda Concha =

Spanish trade unionist (1869–1950)

Francisco Miranda
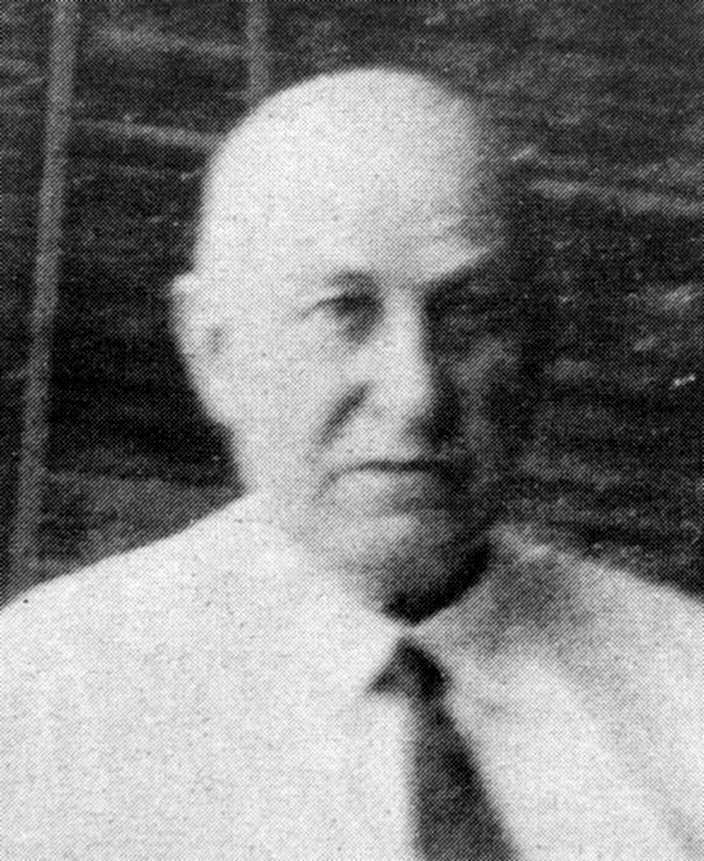
- Miranda (c. 1917)

General Secretary of the Confederación Nacional del Trabajo
- In office March 1917 – August 1917
- Preceded by: Francisco Jordán
- Succeeded by: Manuel Buenacasa (interim)
- In office December 1917 – July 1918
- Preceded by: Manuel Buenacasa (interim)
- Succeeded by: Manuel Buenacasa

Personal details
- Born: Francisco Miranda Concha; 16 February 1868 Madrid, Spain
- Died: 9 February 1950 (aged 81) Barcelona, Spain
- Party: Confederación Nacional del Trabajo
- Occupation: Miller, bookbinder, trade unionist

Francisco Miranda Concha (Madrid, 1869 ? - Barcelona, 1950) was a Spanish trade unionist and militant of the CNT in Barcelona.

== Biography ==
He worked first as a miller and then as a bookbinder, and was the stepson of Anselmo Lorenzo Asperilla. A member of the Confederació Regional del Treball de Catalunya (CRTC), in 1904 he was part of the Workers' Center for Social Studies, chairing its Antimilitarist Committee.

He took an active part in the general strike that preceded the events of the Tragic Week of 1909, in such a way that some historians consider him the true leader in the shadows. Together with Jaume Aragó i Garcia, he organized a group on La Rambla that tried to assault the police station. He managed to escape the police siege and went abroad. He was imprisoned five days after the closure of the First Congress of the CNT (September 16, 1911) and when the CNT was outlawed (1913-1914) he was part of the clandestine commission of the CRTC that tried to reorganize it.

He attended the International Peace Congress held in Ferrol in May 1915, and in the autumn of 1915 was elected assistant secretary in the first committee of the CNT held in legality. He served as general secretary of the CRTC from mid-1916 until he took over as General Secretary of the CNT in March 1917. He was a member of the committee of the revolutionary general strike of August 1917, for which was imprisoned with Ángel Pestaña and Salvador Seguí. In July 1918 he left the general secretariat in the hands of Evelio Boal.

He was imprisoned again in January 1919 at the beginning of the Canadenca strike, and was imprisoned on the ship Pelayo in the port of Barcelona. On March 19, he took part in the rally in the bullring of Les Arenes, proposing on behalf of the prisoners the end of the strike. In February 1921 he was arrested again and imprisoned for almost two years.

Preceded by Francisco Jordán	General Secretary of the CNT 1917-1918	Succeeded by Evelio Boal
