= Pistolerismo =

Civil conflict in Spain between 1917 and 1923

- Part of the crisis of the Restoration
- Date: 1917–1923
- Location: Spain, mainly in industrial areas and especially in Barcelona
- Goals: Achievement of social rights for the working class (CNT and UGT) Repression of all union trade initiatives (counter-revolutionary front)
- Methods: Murders, bombing attacks, strike repressions
- Result: Dictatorship of Primo de Rivera

Parties
Confederación Nacional del Trabajo (CNT); Unión General de Trabajadores (UGT); Anarchist action groups	Sindicatos Libres; Paramilitary militia Somatén; Spanish army Spanish police Employers

Lead figures
Salvador Seguí	Severiano Martínez Anido

Pistolerismo refers both to a specific period of Spanish history, between the general strike of August 1917 and Primo de Rivera's coup in September 1923, and to the social phenomenon spread in many areas of Spain during which Spanish employers hired thugs to intimidate and often attack trade unionists and notable workers – and vice versa. It was characterized by the birth and proliferation of several armed groups composed of pistoleros ("gunfighters"), men specialized in the use of violence.

It reached its most tragic consequences in the region of Catalonia and especially in the city of Barcelona, where hundreds of people were killed or injured as consequence of political violence and social attacks. Above all, social clashes of these years played a fundamental role in the crisis of the Spanish Liberal State, whose existence definitely finished with de Rivera's coup.

== Historical background ==
At the beginning of 20th century, Spain was led by a parliamentary monarchy, also known as Spanish Restoration regime, born in 1874 after the end of the First Spanish Republic and the Restoration of the monarchy with Alfonso XII. The political system was organized around the so-called turno pacífico, the alternation of the two main parties, Liberal and Conservative, and the composition of governments was decided before political elections through a negotiation process between the Ministry of the Interior, the king and local chiefs.

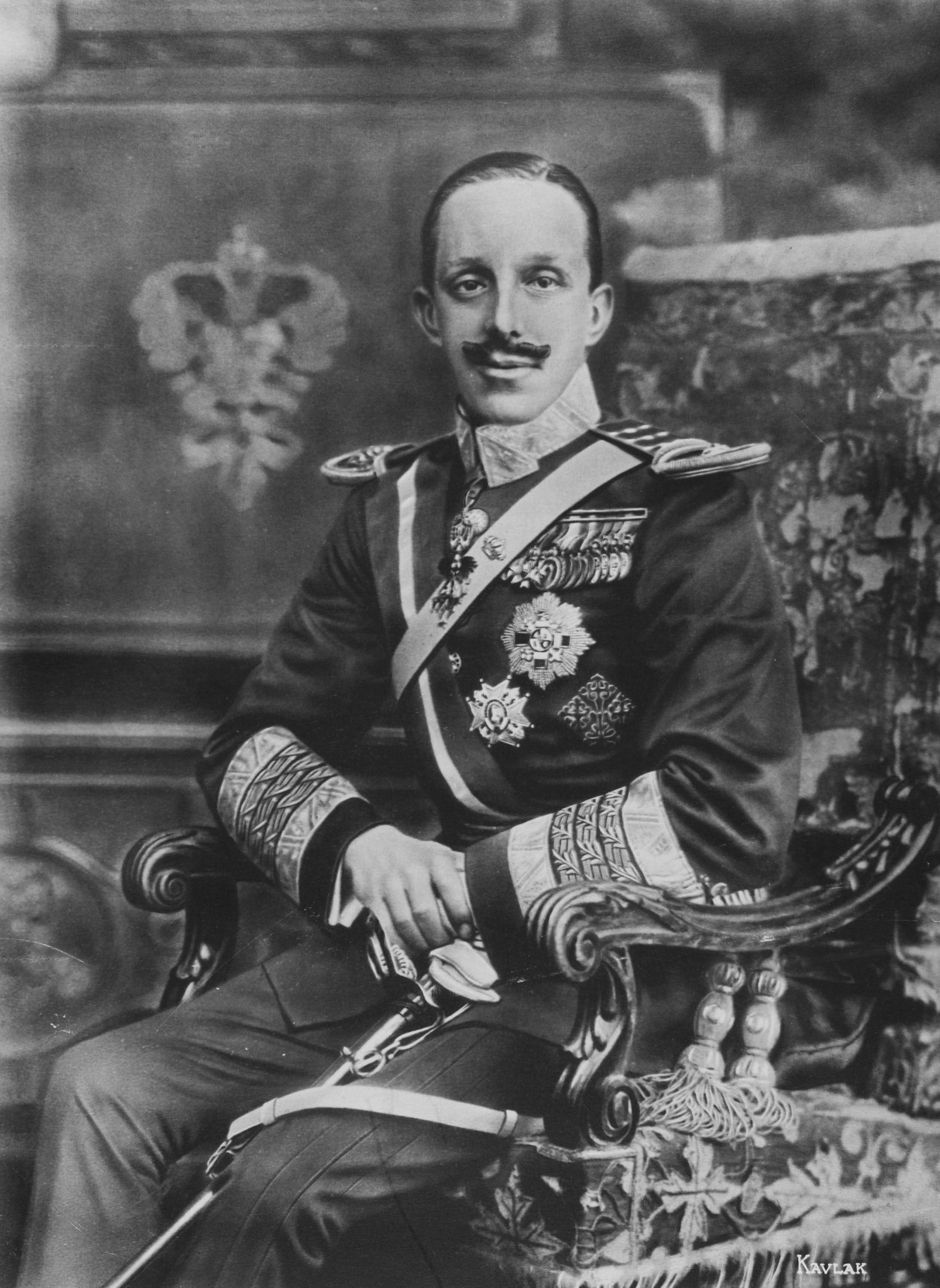
Alfonso XIII, king of Spain from 1886 to 1931

The Spanish Liberal State was built on three main elements: the monarchy, the Catholic Church and the army. After the death of Alfonso XII in 1885, his posthumous child Alfonso XIII became king of Spain. He reigned until the birth of the Second Spanish Republic in 1931.

At that time the Church had a big influence on Spanish society. It organized the educational system and it was in charge of several hospitals and nursing homes. After the election of Pope Pope Leo XIII in 1878 there was a warming of relations between the Spanish State and the Church and in 1883 moderate members of the Catholic Party joined the Conservative Party. This event enabled clergymen to regain support within the Spanish bourgeoisie, which at the turn of the century gained more power and influence in social and political life. Nevertheless, the ecclesiastical world was also a perfect environment for anti-liberal ideas, culminating in the formation of an integralist catholic movement towards the end of the century.

The third bastion of the regime was the army, which from the middle of the 19th century became the referee of the political life. State authorities did not manage to submit it to their control and, as a consequence, soldiers affirmed their role as defenders of the social order. Moreover, political parties used to mobilize the army every time there were strikes, civil disorders and demonstrations. This attitude increased the number of social clashes and fostered the perception that violence was an available instrument for solving social and economic issues.

== Crisis factors ==
Pistolerismo had its roots in the crisis of the Restoration Regime, which from the end of the 19th century showed its weakness to face social and economic transformations in Spanish society. The fragility of the Spanish State, which was the consequence of internal and external factors, produced a growing social instability leading to the explosion of violence.

=== Industrialization and social mobilization ===
In the last decades of 19th century Spain experienced rapid but uneven industrialization which characterized only some areas of the country, especially the Catalonia region. A lot of workers moved from rural areas to big cities such as Barcelona, Valencia and Zaragoza in order to find a job in the factories.

2021 logo of the Unión General de Trabajadores, one of the oldest trade union in the world, founded in 1888

This situation led to important social and economic transformations. In particular, a huge concentration of workforce in limited areas facilitated the circulation of socialist and anarchist ideas and the birth of workers' associations. At the turn of the century there was a multiplication of strikes and labor protests and the number of participants and levels of intensity constantly grew in this period. In 1888 the first national trade union was founded with the name of Unión General de Trabajadores (UGT), helping to transform strikes in an conscious strategy for collective claims. From the beginning of the 20th century social protests and strikes also spread to rural areas, especially Huesca region.

At the turn of the century the spread of strikes and trade unionism produced a sense of fear in Spanish authorities, which started to consider them as real challenges to the established order. The State's answer consisted in increasing its repressive ability, by increasing the number of police forces, such as the Civil Guard. However, it soon became clear that police and gendarmerie forces were not enough for preventing and repressing social disorders, spread throughout the country and sometimes difficult to reach due to lack of modern railways or streets.

As a consequence, authorities were forced to use more and more frequently the army, but this attitude led to the militarization of the public order. At the same time, the incapacity of the State in extending repression to remote areas encouraged the proliferation of self-defense. From the end of the 19th century several groups composed by landlords and employers started to employ violence to fight strikes and defend their properties. An example was the Requeté, a paramilitary group created by Carlists, which during 1910's fought some pitched battles against left-wing associations. This situation facilitated episodes of social clashes and stimulated the use of violence.

=== Military defeat ===
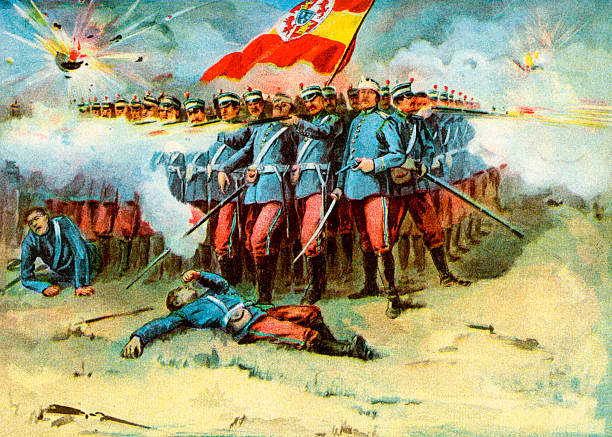
Iconographic representation of a Spanish garrison during the American-Spanish war of 1898

Another factor of crisis was the so-called desastre, the military defeat during the Spanish–American War in 1898. The first consequence for Spain was the loss of her last colonies in the Caribbean Sea and in the Pacific Ocean, resulting from the emancipation of Cuba and Philippines and the acquisition of Puerto Rico and Guam island by U.S.A.

This defeat had significant impacts on the internal social order. In the immediate aftermath of the war numerous critics to politicians emerged and the idea of the necessity of a regeneration became very popular. From that moment, several social actors started to promote different strategies in order to improve or modify state institutions, including the use of political attacks (anarchists) or a military solution (sectors of the Church and parts of the bourgeoisie). At the same time, after the war, the Spanish colonial army was forced to come back in Spain and this provided the authorities with a wider military force, which from the beginning of 20th century was used in the repression, often brutal, of protests and strikes. This attitude contributed to accelerate the loss of legitimacy by civil authorities, which became dependent on the use of the army.

=== First World War ===
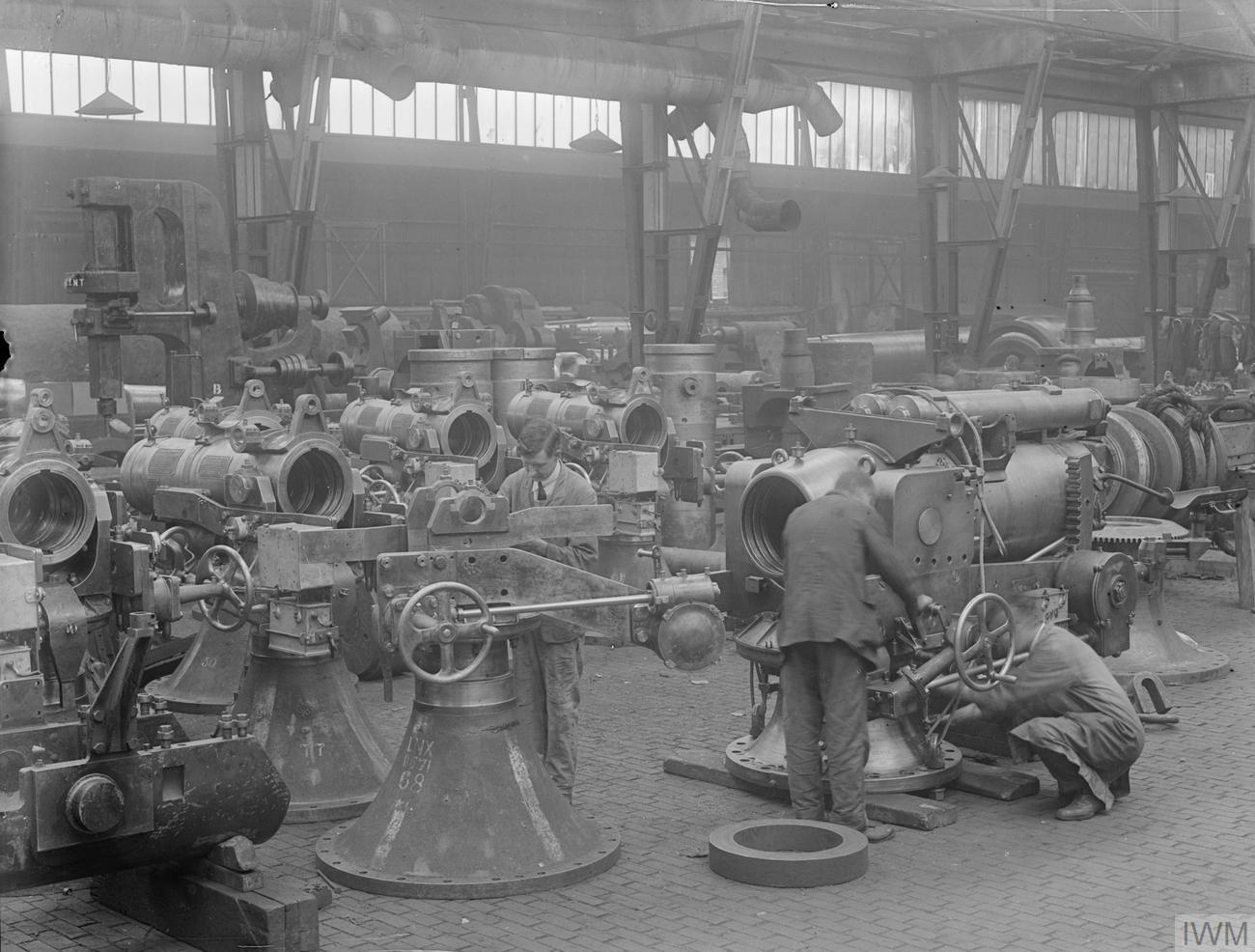
Military industry during WWI

When the First World War broke out in 1914 the conservative government headed by Eduardo Dato decided to remain neutral and this decision was kept for all the duration of the conflict. This situation led to a big development of Spanish industrial production, due to the increased needs of raw materials and military equipment by the countries participating in the war. Thousands of workers moved to the biggest industrial areas with immediate consequences on the social order. In fact, the high number of job demands allowed the employers to reduce wages, but this decision pushed trade unions to increase protests and struggles.

Moreover, during the war there was a deterioration of working class's quality of life, because of the reduction of basic necessities imports and inflation. All these elements encouraged the multiplication of food protests, which forced the end of Dato's government in 1915. Simultaneously, the difficult situation faced by many workers, and their concentration in places where left political ideas were highly developed, facilitated the growth of labor organizations and the radicalization of trade union struggle. Overall, the war was the catalyst of all existing problems and frustrations and it produced important cracks within the Spanish society.

== The origins of the conflict ==
From the beginning of 1916 the new government led by Álvaro Figueroa y Torres tried to minimize the impact of the war by proposing economic reforms in order to reduce the military budget and other state expenses. The failure of this attempt and the worsening of economic situation produced the fall of the government.

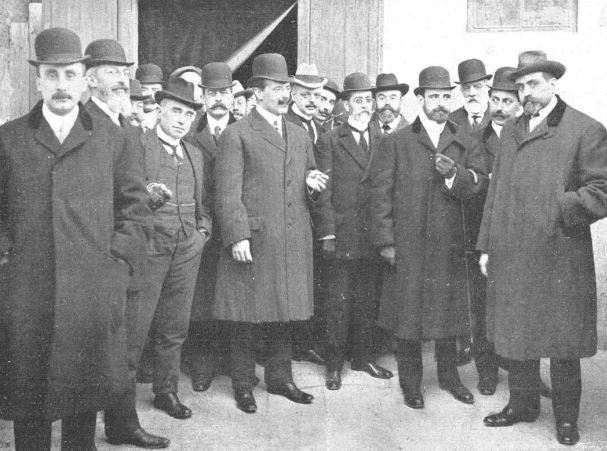
Dirigents of the Lliga Regionalista

In June 1917, the soldiers protested against the reduction of state military budget by creating their own trade unions (Juntas militares de defensa). In July, the Lliga Regionalista, an organization composed by members of the Catalan bourgeoisie, created a regional assembly in order to start a process of constitutional reform in opposition to the Madrid's parliament. In August, the first general strike in Spanish history was organized by UGT, with the support of Confederación Nacional del Trabajo (CNT), a confederation of anarchist trade unions founded in 1910.

The general strike paralyzed for some days some important Spanish cities, but it was strongly repressed by police forces and the army, in an attempt by the new government of Eduardo Dato to take advantage of the crackdown of social protests to unite the army, monarchists and the bourgeoisie. However, the brutal repression radicalized the extreme sections of CNT and encouraged them to use violence as a tool of union struggle.

Until that moment the main strategy adopted by CNT, promoted by Salvador Seguí and the union's most moderate wing, consisted of long strikes which aimed to press authorities to accept the workers' requests. However, the repression of the general strike changed the situation and some anarchists decided to create armed groups, using violence against employers and industrialists. In the period between 1917 and 1918 there were numerous personal attacks, especially in Barcelona. The first anarchist groups were quickly dismantled by police forces but during the last year of the WWI the social situation got worse and violence was perpetuated by spontaneous groups of workers.

== The Bolshevik three years ==
After the end of the war there was a deterioration of the economic situation, because of high level of inflation and strong reduction of exports. Economic crisis, which crossed all Europe in the aftermath of the war, produced a lack of essential goods and a lot of job losses. The period between the end of WWI and 1921 is generally known as trienio bolchevique, because the number of strikes and union struggles reached their apex and levels of social clashes increased in an exponential way. The influence of the October Revolution was very strong in Spain, because it fostered the circulation of socialist and anarchist ideas and encouraged left-wing trade unions to increase levels of union struggle.

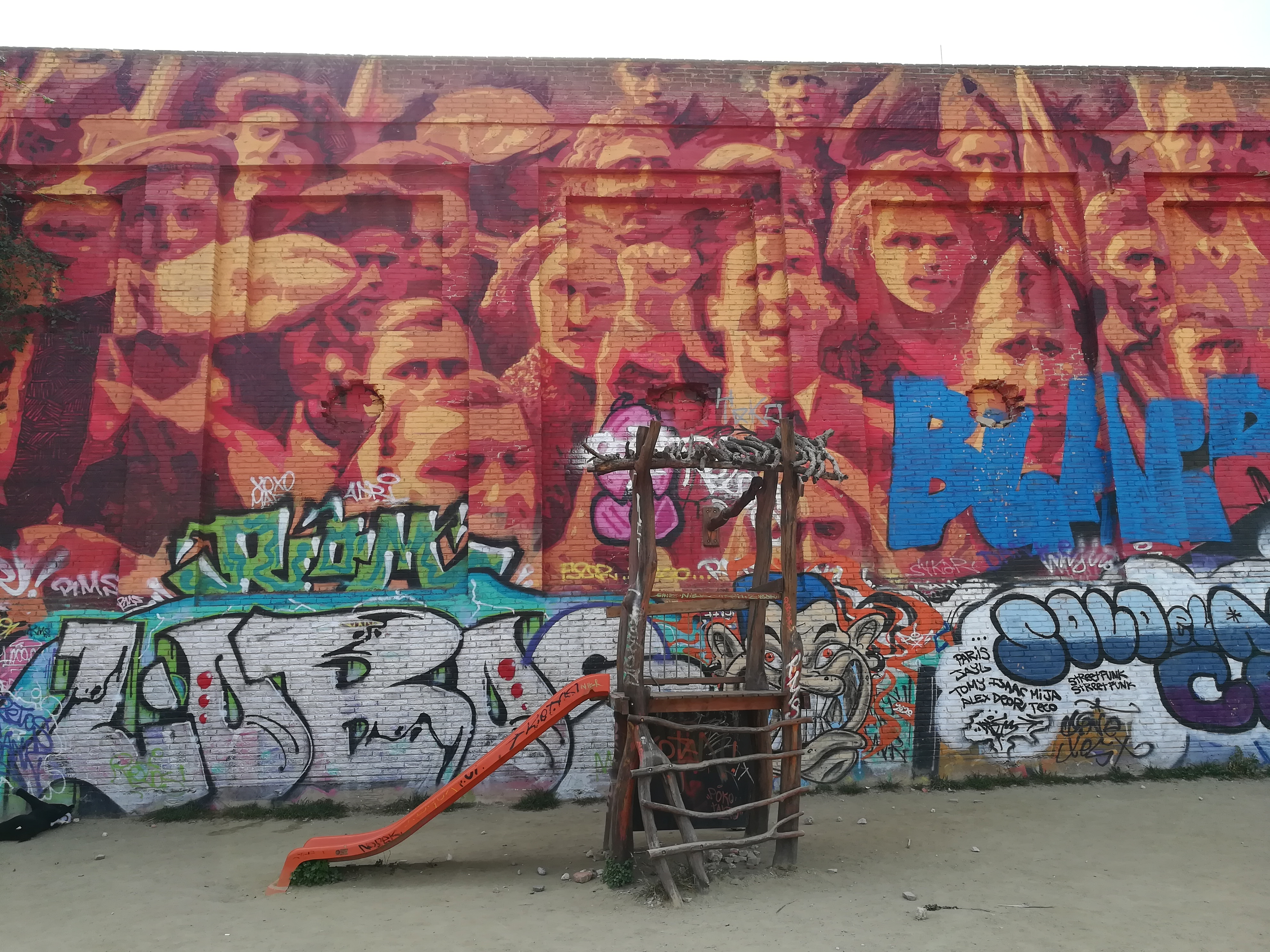
Mural painting for the centenary of the Canandenca strike, Barcelona

This period was inaugurated by the deal between the two main trade unions, CNT and UGT, which during 1918 created sindicatos únicos, unified industrial local sections of the two syndicates, in order to improve the quality of strike actions. One of the main event of this period was the Canadenca strike in February 1919, which blocked the production of the English-Canadian factory Barcelona Traction, locally known as La Canadenca/La Canadiense, for 44 days and forced the Spanish government to enact the "Decree for the eight-hour working day", limiting the working day to eight hours.

During the year the number of CNT's members increased very fast (from 80,541 in 1918 to 845,805 in 1919) and CNT became the most important trade union in Spain. At the same time repressions which followed the Canadenca strike finally allowed the CNT's extremist wing to take control of syndicate's initiatives. As a result, Seguí's moderate approach was definitely replaced by targeted killing operations and in few weeks several anarchist action groups were born and adopted violence and murders as political tools.

Meanwhile, conservative sectors and employers observed this situation with growing anxiety. For limiting CNT's activity they decided to create personal armed associations. As a consequence, from the beginning of 1919 violence and social clashes increased very fast in many areas of the country. In this context an important role was also played by Spanish governments, which tried to stimulate aggressiveness and violence during strikes and protests by sending agitators inside workers organizations, in order to have the excuse for organizing brutal repressions. However, this strategy failed and the only consequence was the rise of fight's levels.

In general, the lack of police forces and governments' weakness in preserving public order pushed an increasing number of private actors to defend their personal interests by the use of arms and violence. Political opponents started to be considered as terrible enemies who it was necessary to defeat with every possible instrument, including killings. This attitude produced a dramatic collision between different actors who started to consider deadly violence as a legitimate instrument of struggle. Immediately consequences were the death or the wounding of hundreds of people and the deterioration of State's and institution's authority.

== The peculiar situation of Barcelona ==
Although the extreme use of political violence was a general phenomenon in Spain's WWI aftermath, Barcelona was undoubtedly the place where levels of violence and numbers of murders reached their peak. At that time the city was the main industrial hub of Spain and socialist and anarchists ideas were highly diffused within the working class. During the war tens of thousands of workers moved to the city attracted by the growing manufacturing industry, stimulating the development of local sectors of trade unions. In 1919 the half of CNT's members were located in Barcelona or in the surrounding areas and the number of strikes was the highest of all Spain.

This peculiar situation pushed conservative sectors and employers to support and finance paramilitary militia, in order to limit the anarcho-syndicalist movement. Nevertheless, the use of military force stimulated a strong answer from anarchist groups, which in the biennium 1919-1920 strongly increased the number of personal attacks and social bombings, in a context in which violence was definitely legitimate as part of social clashes. In these two years a counter-revolutionary front took shape with the aim of crackdown trade unionists and anarchists action groups. This heterogeneous front was formed by different social actors, such as local politicians, armed organizations, conservative and industrial sectors. A central role was played by the Federación Patronal de Barcelona, an organization mainly composed by business leaders enriched during the war, who strongly funded the birth of paramilitary groups.

=== Sometent ===
The biggest armed organization was Sometent, an old paramilitary force born during the Middle Ages in order to protect Catalan citizens. It was composed by private citizens, who had the right to carry weapons, including firearms as pistols and rifles. At the end of 19th century it was radically reformed by the promulgation of a new regulation, which allowed a collaboration with the army and produced the legitimization of the use of violence in order to preserve social peace. At the beginning of the new century Somatén had become a mass movement (44.000 members in 1909) and started to play an important role in the social control of population and in the limitation of socialist and anarchist ideas. In 1905 a royal decree recognized it as an official state police force and from that moment it started to be used in the repression of strikes as an auxiliary force. In general, from the last decade of 19th century Somatén became the armed wing of a corporatist, anti-parliamentarian political culture, deep-rooted in the Catalan bourgeoisie.

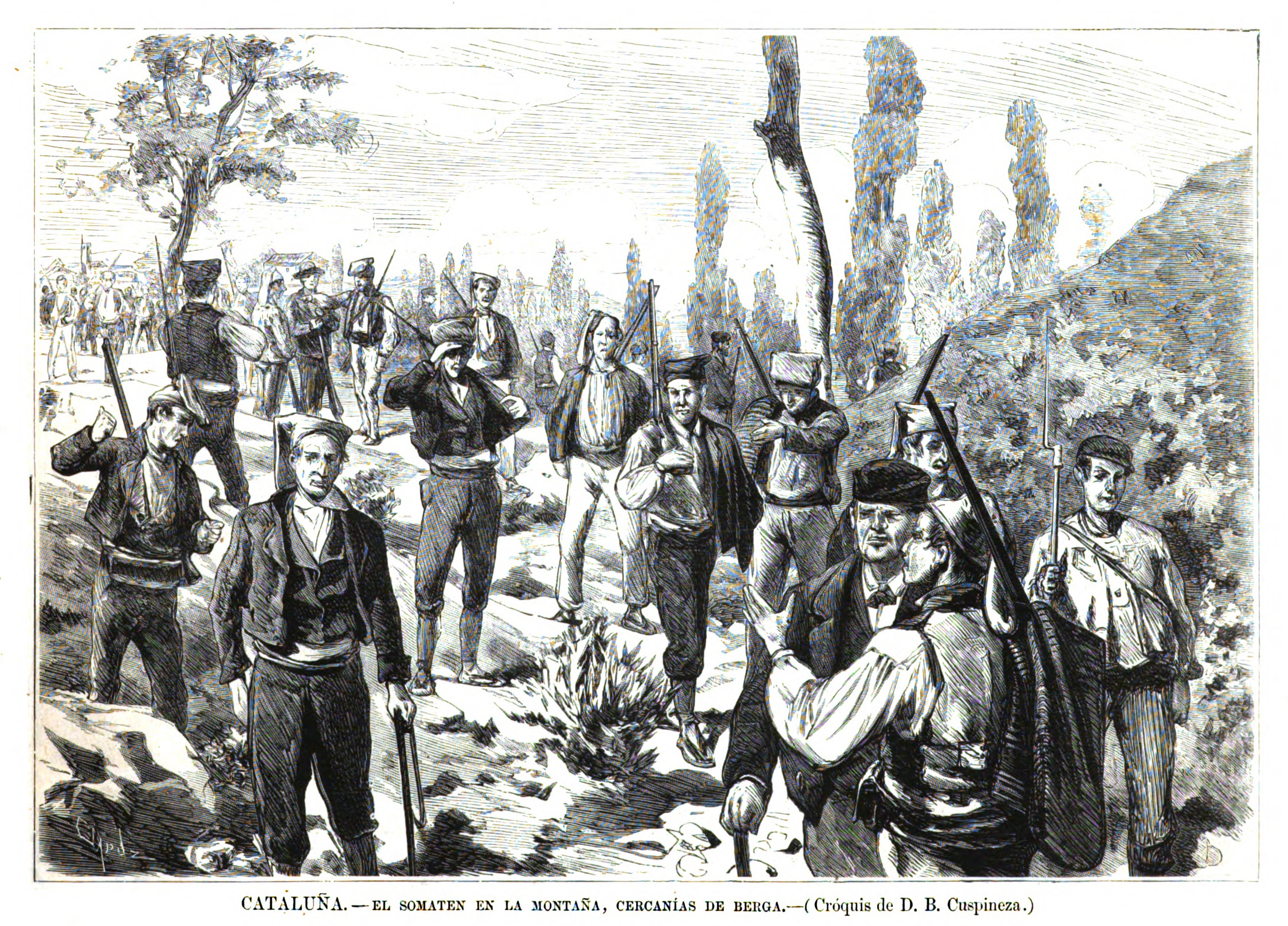
A representation of the Somatén produced by La Ilustración Española y Americana, a weekly Spanish magazine

In the pre-WWI period Somatén showed its strength especially during the Tragic Week of 1909, when it took control of some cities and allowed authorities to concentrate all military corps in Barcelona. Although it was widely spread in all Catalonia, with local sections also in small villages, until the end of WWI it did not exist a Somaten's section in the center of Barcelona, because of the will of not increase levels of clashes. However, in January 1919 sectors of the Catalan bourgeoisie, which were the main funders of the armed group, decided to create a local section of Somatén also in the city center, in order to face the union trade movement.

Since then, the armed corp was often used as an instrument in employer's hands to fight CNT and anarchist action groups. Their members participated into social clashes and contributed to arrest many CNT's activists and leaders. The first important participation of Somatén in the counter-revolutionary war was in March 1919, in the aftermath of the general strike of 24 March, when the government led by Álvaro Figueroa y Torres suspended constitutional guarantees and declared the state of war in all country. In this context Somatén was used for arresting many CNT's militants, which remained in prison for long periods. Overall, in this period Somatén was the main armed wing of Barcelona's industrial men and it contributed to increase levels of violence in city's streets.

=== The Black Band ===
In the same months the counter-revolutionary front became bigger after Federación Patronal de Barcelona decided to create a private police force, Banda Negra (Black Band), with the purpose of increase the military pressure against the syndicate movement. Black Band was materially organized and led by Manuel Bravo Portillo and in a few time it became an important actor in CNT's repression, thanks to generous funding from industrial men. It was composed by ordinary criminals, ex policemen and syndicalists, who organized a series of personal attacks against CNT's executives. In September 1919 an anarchist action group killed Portillo and Rudolf Stalmann, known as baron König, became the new leader. König had an important deal with Miguel Arleguì, the police chief of Barcelona, thanks to which Black Band became a parallel police force. From that moment Black Band started to participate to raids and interrogatories, by using more and more violent practices against leftists. For some months the organization operated under the protection of Jaime Milans del Bosch, the captain general of Catalonia.

The use of violence and of extreme actions was the main element of the organization, which acted in the city until the middle of 1920, when the new government headed by Eduardo Dato decided to dissolve it. In general, Black Band strongly showed the lack of will of Barcelona's industrial world to adopt strategies in order to reduce social clashes and to find a compromise with trade unions. This attitude led to the rise of city's violence, because faced to brutal attacks the labor movement understood that the only way for surviving was to respond to violence by raising levels of violence.

The winter between 1919 and 1920 was a turning point, because employers organized a ten weeks lockout of factories in order to put a limit to strikes and social riots. This decision deteriorated the economic situation of many workers, stimulating a new wave of strikes. In this situation, from the beginning of the new year conservative sectors and members of Spanish authorities decided to definitively suppress CNT's initiatives by using all possible tools. In these months two new military actors appears in Barcelona's social life, inaugurating the most bloody period of recent Spanish history. In the biennium 1920-1921 only in Barcelona 148 people were killed during social fights and 365 people were injured.

=== Sindicatos Libres ===
The main reason of the rise of murders and political attacks was the brutal clash between CNT's militants and a new social actor, active from the beginning of 1920: Sindicatos Libres. They were officially founded on 19 December 1919 by Carlist catholic workers and they represented the attempt to create a well-structured company union, expression of the industrial sectors and able to defend Catalan bourgeoisie's interests face to left trade unions. In the first moment Libres's birth and organization was possible thanks to the Carlist Party, which provide essential services. Moreover, the trade unions got the support of many important Catalan industrial men, Carlist middle-class journalists and lawyers and also catholic movements.

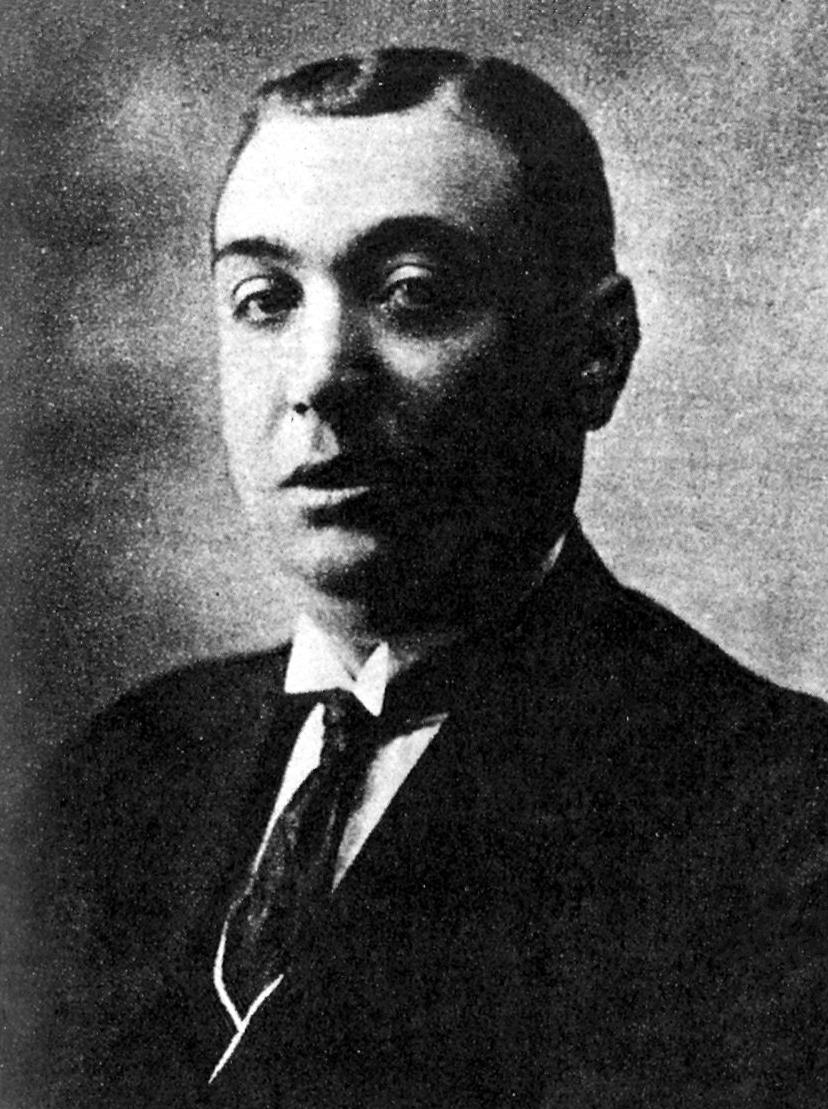
CNT's leader Salvador Seguí, killed in 1923 by Sindicatos Libres armed groups

However, the growth of Sindicatos Libres was possible only when they started to be attractive for a significant part of the working class. In fact, from the summer 1920 a growing number of workers refused CNT's anarchist ideology and decided to join Libres, because of their catholic and conservative ideas or because they did not agree with CNT's extreme political strategy. In the autumn 1920 a real war between CNT and Libres broke out and the starting point was the attempt to kill CNT's leader Salvador Seguí. In few months factories became battlefields and personal murder attempts became an everyday phenomenon. Libres created their own armed groups, formed by carlist workers and professional gunmen who in the previous years had joined other armed groups as the Requeté. They had the support of police authorities and from the beginning of 1921 they started to disarticulate CNT's local units, by murdering or arresting many anarchist militants.

Overall, in the period 1919-1923 it is possible to observe three different moments of the Libres initiatives. Firstly, between their foundation and the beginning of 1921 they had a slow growth, because CNT still maintained a big influence on the working class. At the same time, during this first phase the organization got important collaboration with Catalan owners and sectors of bourgeoisie, which later would have permitted the development of trade unions. Secondly, from mid-1921 to October 1922 Libres became a real mass movement (175.000 members in 1922) and virtually the only representatives of Catalan organized labor, because CNT was outlawed by political authorities and a big number of left activists was imprisoned or murdered. In this period they organized some successful strikes and negotiations, thanks to which they obtained important benefits for many workers. However, in the same time relationship with employers deteriorated and the hearth of the organization radically shifted towards the proletarian world. Thirdly, from the end of 1922 to the Primo de Rivera's coup in September 1923 Libres lost official protections and they were persecuted by the last Liberal governments, headed by José Sánchez Guerra and Manuel Garcia Prieto. Simultaneously, after the end of the strongest repression there was a return of CNT's union actions, which further weakened Libres. After the failure of a clerk strike in August 1923, it started a period of resizing and decomposition, with many workers who gave up the organization.

=== The Army and Ley de fugas ===
The rise of Sindicatos Libres was strongly supported by official protections, especially after Severiano Martínez Anido arrived in Barcelona. In December 1920 the government headed by Eduardo Dato decided to massively use the army in order to defeat anarcho-syndicalist front in Catalonia and particularly in Barcelona. For reaching this goal Anido was appointed at the same time as the civil and military governor of Barcelona, catching in his hands an enormous power. From the beginning Anido had close relationships with the Libres and he hugely supported them with protection and military equipment.

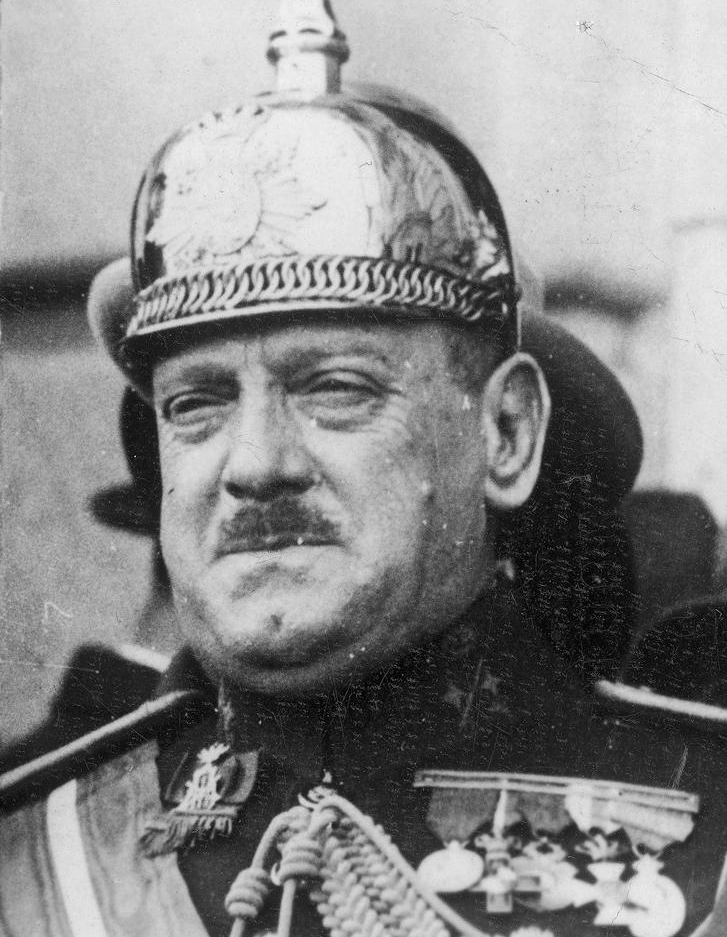
Severiano Martinez Anido in 1925, when he was the Minister of the Interior in Primo de Rivera's government

Anido's nomination finally established the superiority of military authorities over the civil ones in the administration of the public order. Civil authorities were completely deprived of real powers and almost for two years Anido created an autonomous military dictatorship in the middle of Liberal Spain. In this period levels of violence reached their apex and for defeating CNT and anarchist action groups the counter-revolutionary front adopted some brutal strategies, such as mass deportations, depredations, indiscriminate body searches in streets, arbitrary arrests and forced closures of trade union's sections and newspapers.

The most cowardly instrument employed by the counter-revolutionary front was the Ley de Fugas ("Law for the Fugitives"), a form of extrajudicial execution of syndicalists used by security forces. It started to be employed in the aftermath of the general strike of March 1919, but it was generally adopted after Anido's arrive in Barcelona. Prisoners were informed to be free, but when they move away from their prison they were immediately killed in cold blood. This system enabled hiding extrajudicial executions, because authorities wrote on police reports that killings were the consequence of prison escape attempts. By this way, there was a shortage of legal liability and, at the same time, it was almost impossible to understand who had committed murders from who had simply participated to strikes.

Overall, the brutal repression implemented by Anido with the support of different armed groups managed to strongly reduced CNT's ability to defend workers' rights and to organize an efficient union struggle. If in 1919 3.250.000 working days were lost because of strikes, in 1921 this number was reduced to 101.950. However, the anarcho-syndicalist movement wasn't completely defeated and from the end of 1922, in a changed context, it started to reorganize itself.

== Towards the dictatorship ==
During 1922 levels of violence importantly decreased, not only in Barcelona but in all Spain. This reduction was the consequence of the new government's attitude, which from March 1922 pursued the objective to restore legacy and normality in all country. The prime minister Sanchez Guerra decided to re-establish constitutional guarantees and to promote different strategies in order to solve social conflicts, which have had reached terrible consequences not only in industrial areas but also in rural ones, as in Andalusia region. One of the most important decision taken by the government was to remove Martinez Anido in October 1922, in a moment when his brutal approach have had produced dissatisfaction in many sectors of the society, including bourgeois ones.

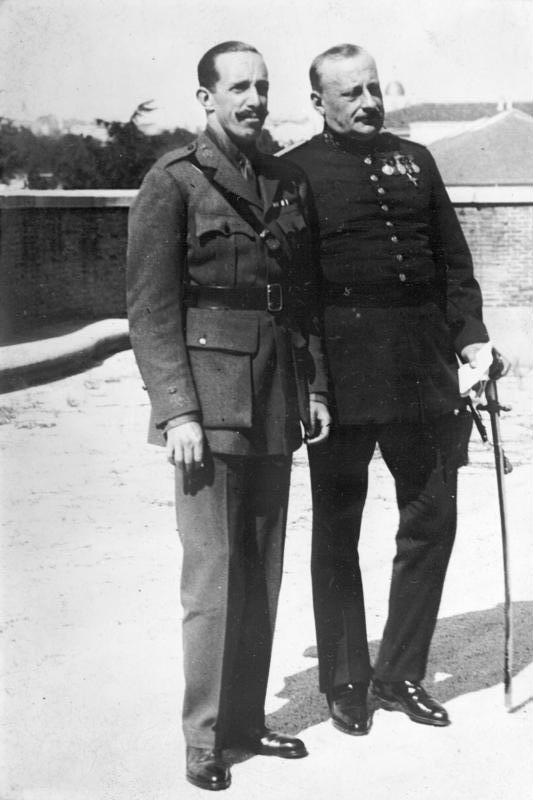
Alfonso XIII (on the left side) with Miguel Primo de Rivera

During the winter 1922-1923 there was an important reduction of personal attacks and murders, especially in Barcelona. This was the consequence of the easing of social repression and the end of Anido's power. However, the restoration of constitutional guarantees permitted to all left militants illegally imprisoned to return to freedom. By this way, CNT's leaders started to rebuild the trade union and anarcho-syndicalist movement regain power in few weeks. Above all, in this phase anarchist action groups reemerged with the goal of take a brutal revenge against their enemies, especially Sindicatos Libres. As a consequence, from February 1923 there was a return of social confidentiality and of personal attacks, which were especially addressed towards Libres's and CNT's leaders. The situation definitely degenerated after Seguí's murder in March 1923, which undermine all the attempts to stabilize Barcelona's social life. This episode led to the last wave of violence, which culminated in the general strike of public transports organized by CNT in August 1923, during which 22 people died and 32 were injured.

Finally, the new wave of social clashes pushed the Catalan industrial world to definitely lose its trust into civil authorities and political men in Madrid. Bourgeoisie and employers saw the army as the only possible solution to this chaotic situation, also because Sindicatos Libres were losing the strength gained during Anido's permanence. In the meanwhile different coup plans where developed by political and social actors, who shared the idea that it was necessity to change the political system from above.

This context facilitated the rise of the new captain general of Catalonia Miguel Primo de Rivera, who in the summer 1923 decided to militarize again the public space by sending troops in the streets. De Rivera took a deal with four generals in Madrid who were organizing a coup and on 11 September 1923 he put in place his plan. During the National Day of Catalonia, there were protests against the government and the army engaged in the colonial war in Morocco. De Rivera exploited this situation to take the power. With the help of Somatén's leaders and the support of the industrial world he suppressed civil authorities in Catalonia, forcing in this way the king to take a clear position. In front of this initiative Alfonso XIII decided to support the coup and on 15 September he appointed de Rivera as the new prime minister, sharing with him the goal to deprived all Spanish political establishment.

== Epilogue ==
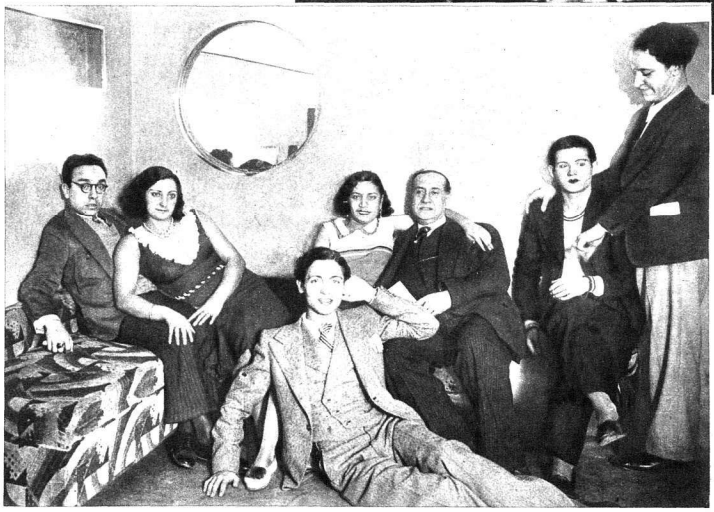
In this 1933 photograph in the cabaret La criolla in the Barrio Chino of Barcelona, the man sitting on the left is "Trotski", a Sindicatos Libres pistolero. The second man from the right is Flor de Otoño, lawyer, night-club performer and anarchist pistolero.

On the whole, the period between 1917 and 1923 was an important breakthrough in the Spanish history, because in a moment of important political, economical and social transformations, the events of these years produced deep fractures in the Spanish society, which were not resolved in the following years, resulting in a long period of social clashes, political repression and reduction of personal freedom, which culminated in 1936 with the explosion of a terrible civil war. Above all, political and social violence played a fundamental role in the crisis of the Spanish Liberal State, by pushing many sectors of the society to choose the military solution.

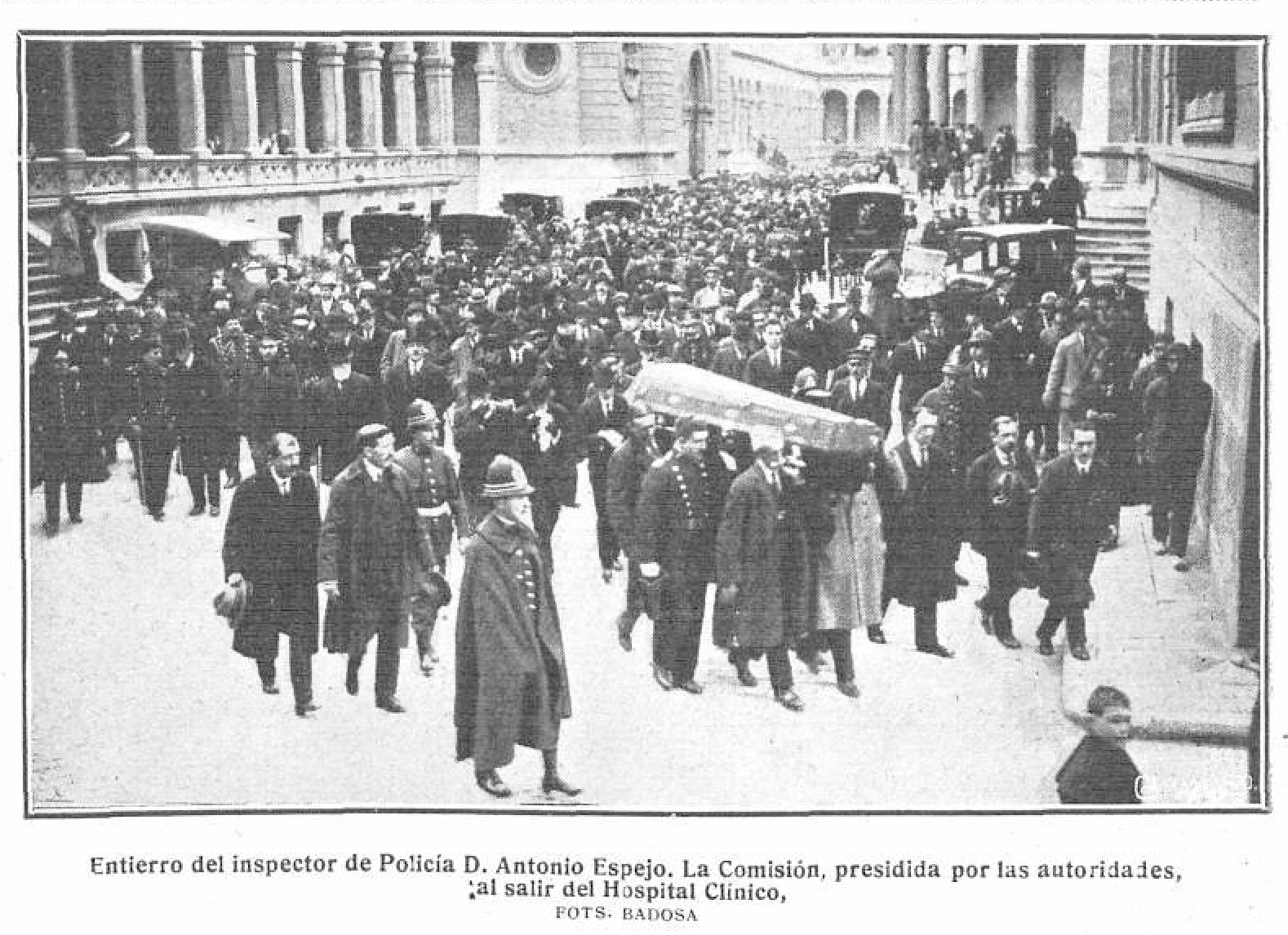
Funeral of the policeman Antonio Espejo (1921), one of the several victims of pistolerismo

Violence of this period had also an important impact on future trade union struggles, especially during the Second Republic. Indeed, the radicalization of labor conflicts prevented the birth of moderate alternatives to CNT, which for this reason could easily rebuilt its leadership in the union trade world after the end of Primo de Rivera's dictatorship in 1930. Moreover, the brutal repression led by the counter-revolutionary front have had eliminated especially moderate sectors of CNT and this weakened Seguì's strategy followed by his collaborators, helping in this way the extremist wing of the organization. As a consequence, from the early 1930s there was the rebirth of anarchist action groups, which recovered the strategy of social attacks and personal murders. However, levels of violence reached during the period 1917-1923 were never achieved again.

To conclude, political violence arose from the weakness of Spanish Liberal State and it strongly contributed to accelerate its crisis, which was already deeply rooted in 1917. The use of violence was indiscriminate in both sides and at the end of the conflict only in Barcelona there were 267 people killed and 583 injured. A lot of important people died in this period: notable figures of the labor movement as Pau Sabater, Evelio Boal, Salvador Seguí and the lawyer and left-wing politician Francesc Layret. On the other side, anarchists' killings included noteworthy politicians such as Eduardo Dato, who was killed in 1921 when he was the prime minister, and Juan Soldevila y Romero, archbishop of Zaragoza.

== See also ==
- Monarchy of Spain
- Geography of Spain
- Pope
- Economic history of Spain
- Origins of the labor movement in Spain
- Carlist Wars
- Russian Revolution
- Bolshevik Party
- Spanish Cortes
- History of anarchism
- History of socialism
- Spanish Empire
- Catalan Nationalist Party
- Rif War
- Catholicism in the Second Spanish Republic
- Spanish Civil War
- Francisco Franco
- Politics of Spain

== Bibliography ==
- Rodriguez, Arturo Zoffmann; Bonnefoy, Juan Cristóbal Marinello (2021). "A Proletarian Turf War: The Rise and Fall of Barcelona's Sindicatos Libres, 1919–1923". International Review of Social History. 66 (2): 243–271. doi:10.1017/S0020859021000213. ISSN 0020-8590. S2CID 234803462.
- Marinello Bonnefoy, Juan Cristóbal (2020). "Pistolerismo y violencia sindical en Barcelona (1917-1923)". Barcelona: quaderns d'història (in Spanish) (26): 133–148. ISSN 2339-9805.
- Andrews, Nathaniel (2019). "Repression, solidarity, and a legacy of violence: Spanish anarcho-syndicalism and the years of 'pistolerismo', 1919-23". International Journal of Iberian Studies. 32 (3): 173–193. doi:10.1386/ijis_00004_1. ISSN 1364-971X. S2CID 213843688.
- Rinke, Stefan; Wildt, Michael (2017). Revolutions and Counter-Revolutions: 1917 and Its Aftermath from a Global Perspective. Frankfurt: Campus Verlag. ISBN 978-3-593-50705-7.
- Carden, Ron (2017). German Policy Toward Neutral Spain, 1914-1918. London; New York: Routledge. ISBN 978-1-138-97517-0.
- Caracciolo, Lucio; Roccucci, Adriano (2017). Storia contemporanea: dal mondo europeo al mondo senza centro (in Italian). Firenze: Le Monnier Università. ISBN 978-88-00-74473-7.
- Albanese, Giulia (2016). Dittature mediterranee: sovversioni fasciste e colpi di Stato in Italia, Spagna e Portogallo (in Italian) (1st ed.). Roma: Laterza. ISBN 978-88-581-1961-7.
- Barry, Gearóid; Dal Lago, Enrico; Healy, Róisín (2016). Small Nations and Colonial Peripheries in World War I. Boston: Brill. ISBN 978-90-04-29296-3.
- Romero Salvadó, Francisco J. (2016). The foundations of civil war: revolution, social conflict and reaction in liberal Spain, 1916-1923. Abingdon, Oxon; New York: Routledge. ISBN 978-0-415-39603-5.
- Ealham, Chris (2015). Living anarchism: José Peirats and the Spanish anarcho-syndicalist movement. Oakland: AK Press. ISBN 978-1-84935-238-3.
- Marinello Bonnefoy, Juan Cristóbal; Gabriel, Pere (2015). Sindicalismo y violencia en Catalunya 1902-1919 (in Spanish). Barcelona: Universitat Autònoma de Barcelona.
- Millan, Matteo (2015). "Milizie civiche prima della Grande guerra. Violenza politica e crisi dello Stato in Italia e in Spagna (1900-1915)". Storica (in Italian). 58: 51–83. ISBN 978-88-6728-391-0.
- Ealham, Chris (2014). Class, Culture and Conflict in Barcelona, 1898-1937. London: Routledge. ISBN 978-0-415-85983-7.
- Giardina, Andrea; Sabbatucci, Giovanni; Vidotto, Vittorio (2014). I mondi della storia. 3, manuale: Guerre mondiali, decolonizzazione, globalizzazione (in Italian) (1st ed.). Bari: Laterza. ISBN 978-88-421-1246-4.
- Winston, Colin M. (2014). Workers and the Right in Spain, 1900-1936. Princeton: Princeton University Press. ISBN 978-1-4008-5809-5.
- Hanhimäki, Jussi M.; Blumenau, Bernhard, eds. (2013). An international history of terrorism: Western and non-Western experiences. Abingdon, Oxon; New York: Routledge. ISBN 978-0-415-63540-0.
- Gerwarth, Robert; Horne, John (2011). "Vectors of Violence: Paramilitarism in Europe after the Great War, 1917–1923". The Journal of Modern History. 83 (3): 489–512. doi:10.1086/660364. S2CID 85552867.
- McHarg, Farquhar (2011). Pistoleros!: The Chronicles of Farquhar McHarg: I: 1918. Chicago: PM Press. ISBN 978-1-60486-649-0.
- Romero Salvadò, Francisco J.; Smith, Angel, eds. (2010). The Agony of Spanish Liberalism : from revolution to dictatorship 1913-1923. Houndmills, Basingstoke, Hampshire: Palgrave Macmillan. doi:10.1057/9780230274648. ISBN 978-1-349-36383-4.
- Smith, Angel (2007). "The Catalan Counter-revolutionary Coalition and the Primo de Rivera Coup, 1917-23". European History Quarterly. 37 (1): 7–34. doi:10.1177/0265691407071800. S2CID 144883544.
- Smith, Angel (2007). Anarchism, Revolution and Reaction: Catalan Labor and the Crisis of the Spanish State, 1898-1923. New York; Oxford: Berghahn Books. ISBN 978-1-84545-176-9.
- Hermet, Guy (1999). Storia della Spagna nel Novecento (in Italian). Bologna: Il Mulino. ISBN 978-88-15-07207-8.
- González Calleja, Eduardo; del Rey Reguillo, Fernando (1995). La defensa armada contra la revolución: una historia de las "guardias civicas" en la España del siglo XX (in Spanish). Madrid: Consejo superior de investigaciones científicas. ISBN 978-84-00-07552-1.
- Aróstegui Sánchez, Julio (1988). "La tradición militar del carlismo y el origen del requeté". Aportes: Revista de historia contemporánea (in Spanish). 3 (8): 3–24. ISSN 0213-5868.
- Balcells, Albert (1987). "Violencia y terrorismo en la lucha de clases en Barcelona de 1913 a 1923". Estudios de historia social (in Spanish). 42–43: 37–79. ISSN 0210-1416.
- León, Ignacio (1981). Los años del pistolerismo: ensayo para una guerra civil (in Spanish) (1st ed.). Barcelona: Planeta. ISBN 978-84-320-3600-2.
- Bar, Antonio (1981). La CNT en los años rojos: del sindicalismo revolucionario al anarcosindicalismo, 1910-1926 (in Spanish). Madrid: Akal. ISBN 978-84-7339-577-9.
- Bueso, Adolfo (1978). Recuerdos de un cenetista (in Spanish). Barcelona: Ariel. ISBN 978-84-344-2492-0.
- Balcells, Albert (1977). Cataluña contemporánea II. 1900-1939 (in Spanish) (2nd ed.). Madrid: Siglo Veintiuno de España Editores. ISBN 978-84-323-0160-5.
- Balcells, Albert (2009). El Pistolerisme: Barcelona (1917-1923) (in Catalan). Barcelona: Pòrtic. ISBN 9788498090642. OCLC 804326178.
- Oterino Cervelló, Armando (1972). "El Somatén Armado de Cataluña". Revista de Estudios Históricos de la Guardia Civil (in Spanish). 9: 9–38.
