= Villanueva del Aceral =

- municipality
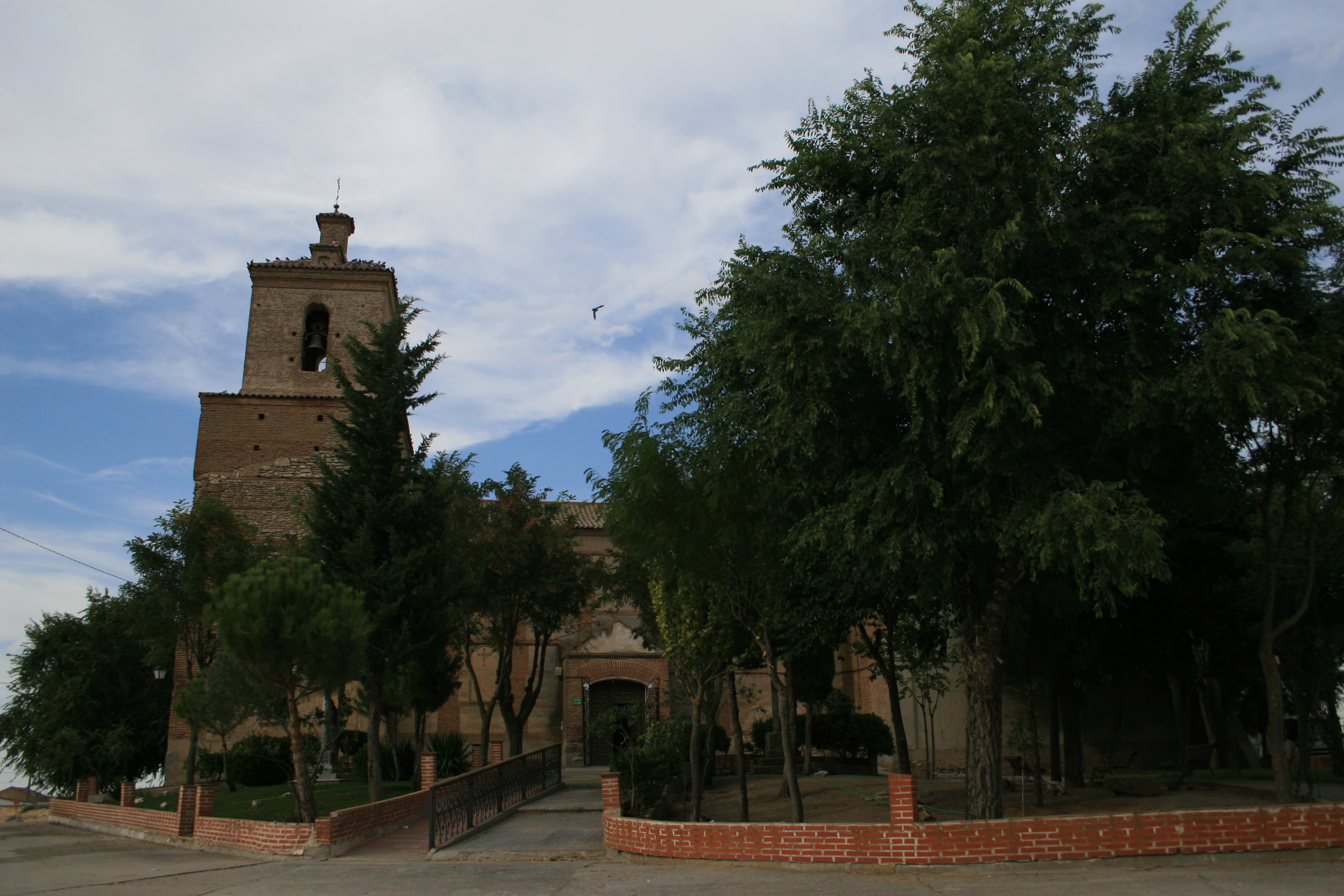
- Church of Villanueva del Aceral

- Flag Coat of arms

- Location in Spain. Villanueva del Aceral (Spain)
- Coordinates: 41°02′29″N 4°51′08″W
- Country: Spain
- Autonomous community: Castile and León
- Province: Ávila
- Municipality: Villanueva del Aceral

Area
  - Total: 17 km^{2} (6.6 sq mi)

Population (2025-01-01)
  - Total: 86
  - Density: 5.1/km^{2} (13/sq mi)
- Time zone: UTC+1 (CET)
  - Summer (DST): UTC+2 (CEST)
- Website: Official website

Villanueva del Aceral is a municipality located in the province of Ávila, Castile and León, Spain.

== Population ==
Historical population
Year	Pop.	±% p.a.
2023	97	—
2024	92	−5.15%
2025	86	−6.52%
Source: INE
