= Manuel Buenacasa =

Spanish anarchist (1886–1964)

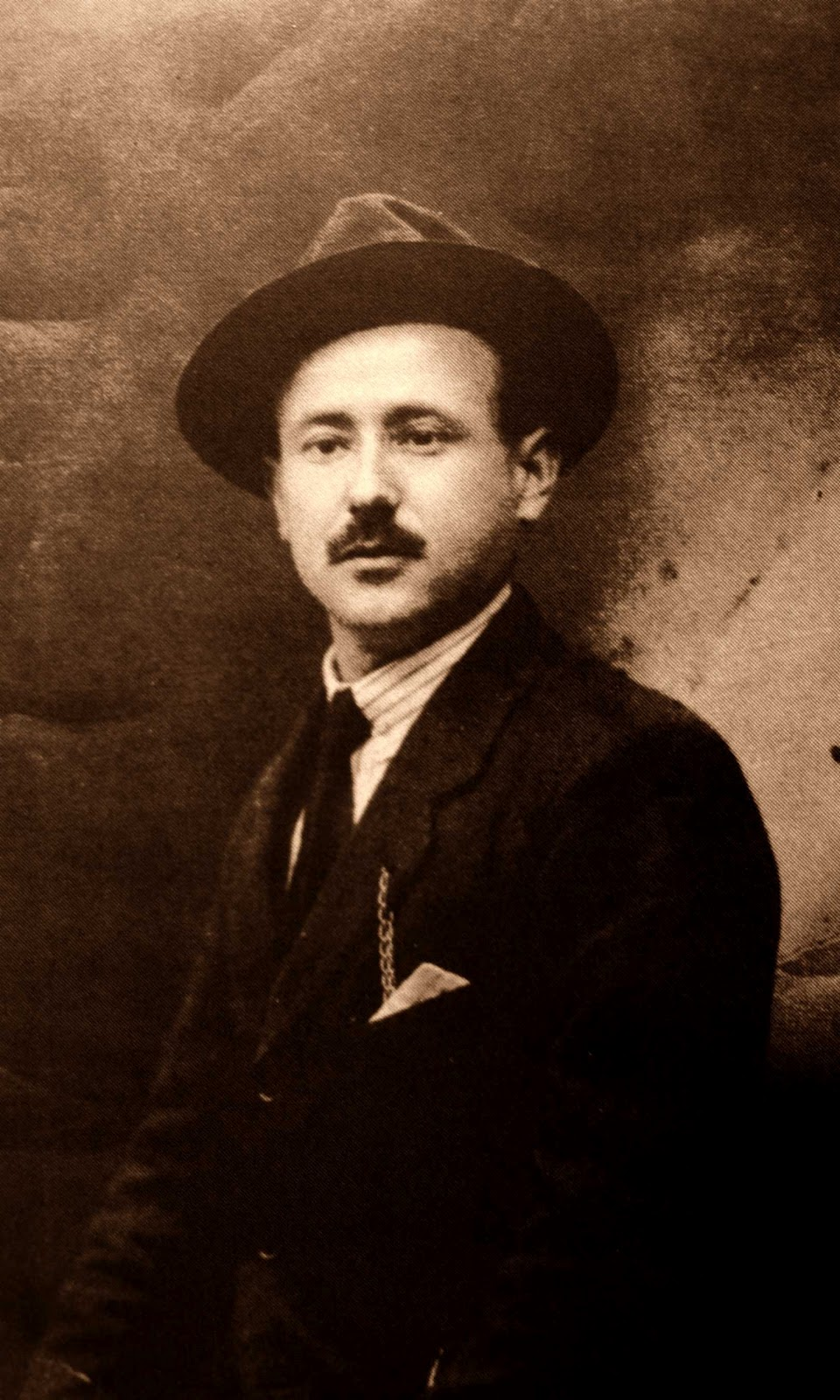
- Buenacasa (c. 1918)

General Secretary of the Confederación Nacional del Trabajo
- In office August 1918 – December 1918
- Preceded by: Francisco Miranda
- Succeeded by: Evelio Boal
- Interim General Secretary
- In office August 1917 – November 1917
- Preceded by: Francisco Miranda
- Succeeded by: Francisco Miranda

Personal details
- Born: Manuel Buenacasa Tomeo; 7 July 1886 Caspe, Aragon, Spain
- Died: 6 November 1964 (aged 78) Bourg-lès-Valence, Drôme, France

Manuel Buenacasa Tomeo (1886–1964) was a Spanish militant anarchist, general secretary and chronicler of the Confederación Nacional del Trabajo (CNT) and Federación Anarquista Ibérica (FAI) trade unions.

== Career ==
Buenacasa was born on 7 July 1886, in the Spanish town of Caspe, where he started school. He trained for priesthood in a Franciscan seminary in Villanueva del Aceral, but left as a late teen to become a carpenter in his home province. He kept this trade for the remainder of his life.

Buenacasa joined the province's carpenter union in 1906 and quickly became its president. He came to edit a regional anarchist newspaper, Cultura y Acción, in 1910. Following a violent strike, he went into exile. In England, Buenacasa met Errico Malatesta. Upon receiving government clemency, Buenacasa returned to Spain in 1913. During his time in Barcelona, between 1914 and 1921, he was jailed and exiled multiple times. He became a member of the Confederación Nacional del Trabajo (CNT) labor union in 1914, and joined its national committee four years later. Buenacasa organized the CNT's December 1919 congress in Madrid. He advocated for a Third International, though he would later regret this. In 1921, he returned to Zaragoza to edit Cultura y Acción. The next year, he became secretary of the region's CNT.

From 1923 to 1930, the years of the Miguel Primo de Rivera dictatorship, Buenacasa went into exile multiple times. He came to edit the Catalonian anarchist newspaper El Productor in 1925. Buenacasa joined in the founding of the militant Federación Anarquista Ibérica (FAI) in July 2017 and moderated between the CNT and FAI in the coming years, having been a major contributor to the growth of both. He chronicled this time in the 1933 book, La CNT, los Treinta y la FAI. He had earlier written the 1928 history, El Movimiento Obrero Español (1886-1926). Historia y Crítica, or The Spanish Workers Movement (1886–1926): History and Criticism, which was later reissued in Paris in 1966. Buenacasa's writings are among the foremost sources on internal CNT and FAI operations.

He led a school during the Spanish Civil War and afterwards, he was held in a French concentration camp. Buenacasa worked to reorganize the CNT in exile. He died in Bourg-lès-Valence, France, on 6 November 1964. Though he remained a lifelong militant anarchist, Buenacasa opposed the terrorist actions in the name of anarchism.

== Personal life ==
Buenacasa was married in 1910 and had one son.

== Bibliography ==
- Amodia, José (1995). "Buenacasa, Manuel". In Lane, A. Thomas (ed.). Biographical Dictionary of European Labor Leaders. Greenwood Publishing Group. pp. 159–160. ISBN 978-0-313-26456-6.
- Bookchin, Murray (1977). The Spanish Anarchists: The Heroic Years, 1868–1936. New York: Free Life Editions. ISBN 978-0-914156-14-7.
- "Buenacasa, Miguel". Gran Enciclopedia Aragonesa Online. 2009.
- Kern, R. W. Red Years, Black Years. 1978.
