= La Canadenca strike =

Historical general strike in Catalonia

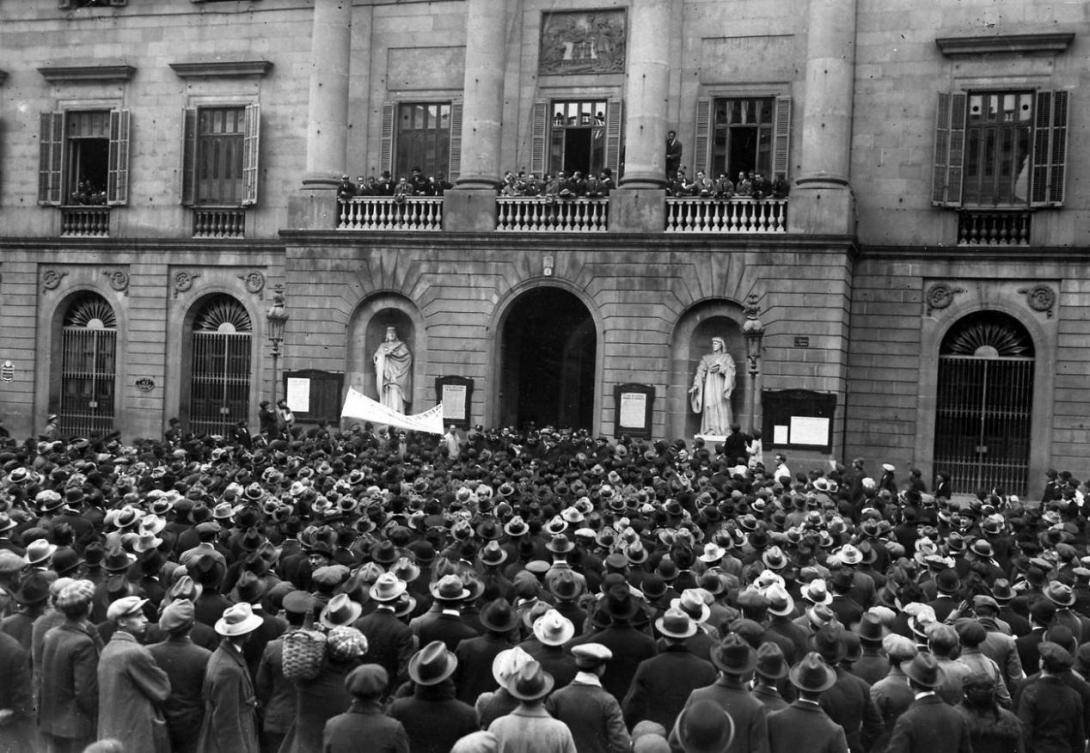
Workers on strike hearing a speech in Barcelona, February 14, 1919

The Canadenca strike (Catalan: Vaga de La Canadenca, Spanish: huelga de La Canadiense) was a historic strike action in Barcelona, Catalonia, Spain, that was initiated in February 1919 by the Confederación Nacional del Trabajo (CNT) and lasted over 44 days evolving into a general strike paralyzing much of the industry of Catalonia. Among its consequences was to force the Spanish government to issue the Decreto de la jornada de ocho horas de trabajo, the first law limiting the working day to eight hours. The strike originated at the principal electricity company in Barcelona, Riegos y Fuerzas del Ebro, a subsidiary of Barcelona Traction, popularly known as la Canadenca because its major shareholder was the Canadian Bank of Commerce of Toronto.

== Background ==
The strike was part of the rise of the anarcho-syndicalist CNT which reached its maximum point in the National Congress of December 1919 in Madrid (the CNT's members increased from 80,541 in 1918 to 845,805 in 1919). It was, likewise, the first major action of the CNT after the reorganization into single unions carried out by the Regional Confederation of Catalonia, which the entire organization would later adopt. The choice to start the strike at the principal electricity company of Catalonia, vital for the industry of the entire region, aimed to make Catalan business owners recognize CNT as a major organized labor force.

In January, weeks before initiating the strike, the Regional Confederation of Catalonia organized an agitation campaign in which it sent its best speakers (among whom were Salvador Seguí, Ángel Pestaña and Manuel Buenacasa) to Levante and Andalusia. This campaign greatly alarmed the government and, along with the agitation that was taking place in Barcelona, led the government of Álvaro de Figueroa to suspend constitutional guarantees, arrest important figures and CNT leaders like Negre, Buenacasa or Seguí and to close unions and the newspaper Solidaridad Obrera.

== Events of the strike ==
=== Start of the strike ===
The strike was initiated as a solidarity act to eight workers who had been fired from the Riegos y Fuerzas del Ebro. Some days before, the company had decided to lower the workers' salaries camouflaging the wage reduction by simultaneously changing these workers' status from temporary to permanent employment. Some of the workers affected by this action were members of the CNT and turned to it to defend their wages, resulting to their dismissal by the company. Three days later, on February 5, the workers of the billing section of the company started the strike until the reinstatement of their colleagues and sent a commission to the civil governor, Carlos González Rothwos, the president of the association and the mayor requesting them to intervene. The management called the police to kick them out of the factory. Their dismissal caused other sections of the company to join the strike.

At this point the conflict took on other overtones, it was no longer just a labor struggle, what was at stake was the recognition of the unions and the right of workers to organize. A strike committee made up of several of those fired and members of the CNT led by Simó Piera was appointed. On February 8, almost the entire workforce declared a strike and the electric bill collectors refused to carry out their work. A part of the Electric Power of Catalonia staff began to show solidarity and began a strike in their company. The workers of La Canadenca published their demands from the company: reinstatement of all those fired, salary increases, dismissal of strikebreakers and no retaliation by the management against the strikers. Two days later, the company responded with a statement accusing the unions of taking political advantage of the conflict. The situation worsened: the dependency of a multitude of services and industries on the energy of La Canadenca forced them to stop, a strikebreaker collector was murdered on February 12 and conflicts arose in other sectors such as the public transport drivers and the workers in the newspaper El Diluvio. In addition, on February 17, the textile sector joined the strike with the demands of 8-hour work day, half day of work on Saturday, the abolition of payment by piece, the payment of the full day's wage in case of accident, prohibition of work for minors under 14 years of age and full pay for the week once started.

=== General strike in Barcelona ===
On February 21, the strike in the electrical sector was general, with the participation of the workers of all electrical companies. This way, 70% of the Catalan industry, trams or newspapers, among others, was paralyzed. After speaking with the British embassy, the government seized the company and sent some members of the engineering corps and the navy to operate it. Military technicians calculated that they would need four days to restore service. Contrary to the governor, Joaquín Milans del Bosch, captain general of Barcelona, considered it necessary to declare a state of war. On February 27, the strike in gas and water companies had also become general. Álvaro de Figueroa declared that same day that he would resign when order was restored in Barcelona.

On March 1, the government seized the water service and the mayor contacted the strike committee. He was presented with three conditions and a term of two days to answer, which were: freedom of the prisoners imprisoned since January 16, the opening of the unions and the immunity of the members of the committee. The proposals were rejected by the government and the companies published that all those workers who did not return to work on March 6 would be fired. On March 7 the movement was extended to the railway sector and on the 12th of the same month the strike was general. On March 9 the government to published the decree of the captain general, Milans del Bosch, declaring a state of war and calling to arms all the workers of the companies on strike with a sentence of four years in prison for those who did not appear in their recruitment areas. However, most of the workers did not show up and many were imprisoned in the castle of Montjuich, where almost three thousand prisoners were interned.

=== Conclusion ===
By March 13, the government was looking for the path of negotiation. For this reason, it sent to Barcelona the sub-secretary of the presidency José Morete; Carlos Montañés, an engineer with Catalan sympathies, was appointed civil governor; and Gerardo Doval held the position of chief of police. At the same time, the state of war and the existing press censorship were maintained. The government was concerned that the strike would spread to other areas of strong CNT presence such as Valencia, Zaragoza or Andalusia and feared that the Unión General de Trabajadores (UGT) would show solidarity. During March 15 and 16, several meetings were held between the union committee, the civil authorities and the company, which took place at the headquarters of the Institute of Social Reforms, where an agreement with the following terms was reached: the end of the conflict, freedom to all prisoners arrested for "social crimes" who were not subject to trial, reinstatement of all strikers without reprisals, a general and proportional increase in the wages of the workers of La Canadenca, a maximum working day of eight hours and payment of half a month for the duration of the strike. In order for this agreement to be carried out, it would have to have the consent of the workers, for which a rally was called in the Las Arenas bullring. The rally was attended by around 25,000 workers and, on March 19, after Seguí's intervention at the rally, it was agreed to end the strike.

=== Achievements ===
This strike, which has been considered one of the most important strikes in the history of Spain, ended as a complete victory for the unions, as the workers of La Canadenca, drivers, textile workers and printers improved their employment terms. Among the improvements, the eight-hour day signed on April 3 stands out, because it made Spain the first country in the world to establish it by law. Moreover, the most aggressive currents of the workers were kept disciplined; in the forty-four days of the strike very few violent acts took place: a bomb and four murders, isolated events in the face of the pacifism of the majority of the workers. Lastly, it placed social issues in a prominent place within Catalan politics and made the CNT into one of the most influential organizations of Catalonia and Spain.

== Aftermath ==
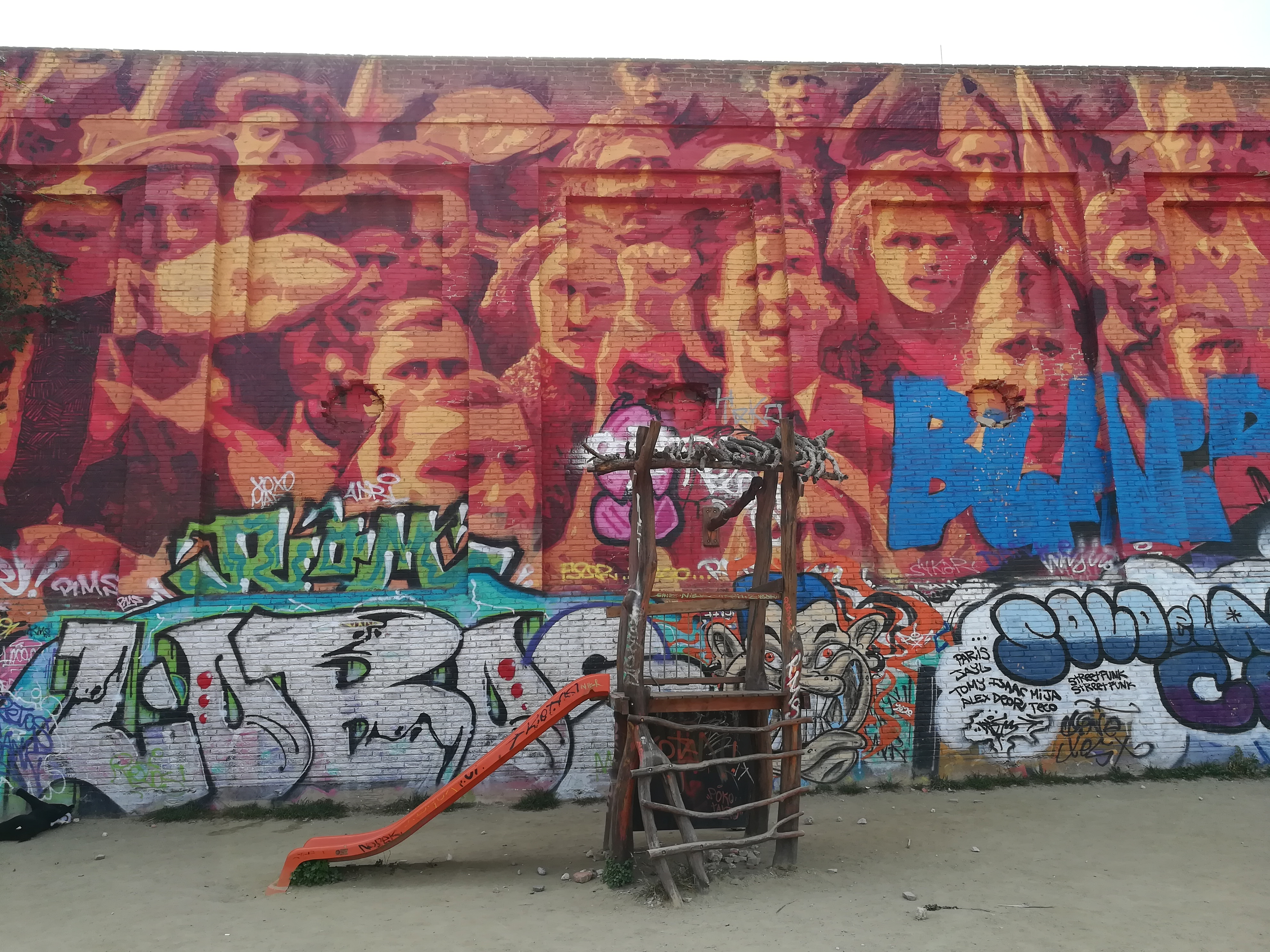
Defaced mural commemorating the 100th anniversary of the strike on a former factory of Barcelona

Five days after the victory in La Canadenca, on March 24, a general strike was declared again throughout Catalonia. The strike was triggered by the government's refusal to release all the people imprisoned during the first strike as agreed. This second strike was called after pressure by most intransigent groups, and while negotiations were still being held with the government. In this occasion the government responded more harshly, took out the army from the first moment and stationed machine guns and cannons in the streets. Paramilitary groups were also organized and authorized to open stores, supply the city and arrest workers. On April 3, the decree was promulgated that imposed the 8-hour day from October and afterwards, getting many workers to return to work, resulting in the strike's intensity declining until April 14, when it was concluded. However, the state of war and anti-union repression kept being present.

One of the most imminent consequences was the creation of the Catalan Employers' Federation, in the hands of the most "intransigent" and "combative" employers, which was organized to confront the new trade unionism that maintained these strikes. Among the measures used against the unions were the lockouts, the blacklists and the massive dismissals of unionized workers. This situation led to anarchist action groups, nourished by numerous dismissed workers and inserted in blacklists, gaining strength and replacing the more moderate worker's representatives. On the other hand, a change in the government, from (the more open to negotiation) Álvaro de Figueroa's government to the more authoritarian Maura's, made repression harsher. Bravo Portillo, who had formerly been imprisoned for collaborating with Germany in World War I, returned to the Barcelona police and contributed to the harsh repression.

== See also ==
- Anarchism in Spain
- Labor movement in Spain
- Pistolerismo
- Tragic Week
